= Celadon =

Term referring to a blue or green glaze used in ceramics and the ceramics glazed with it

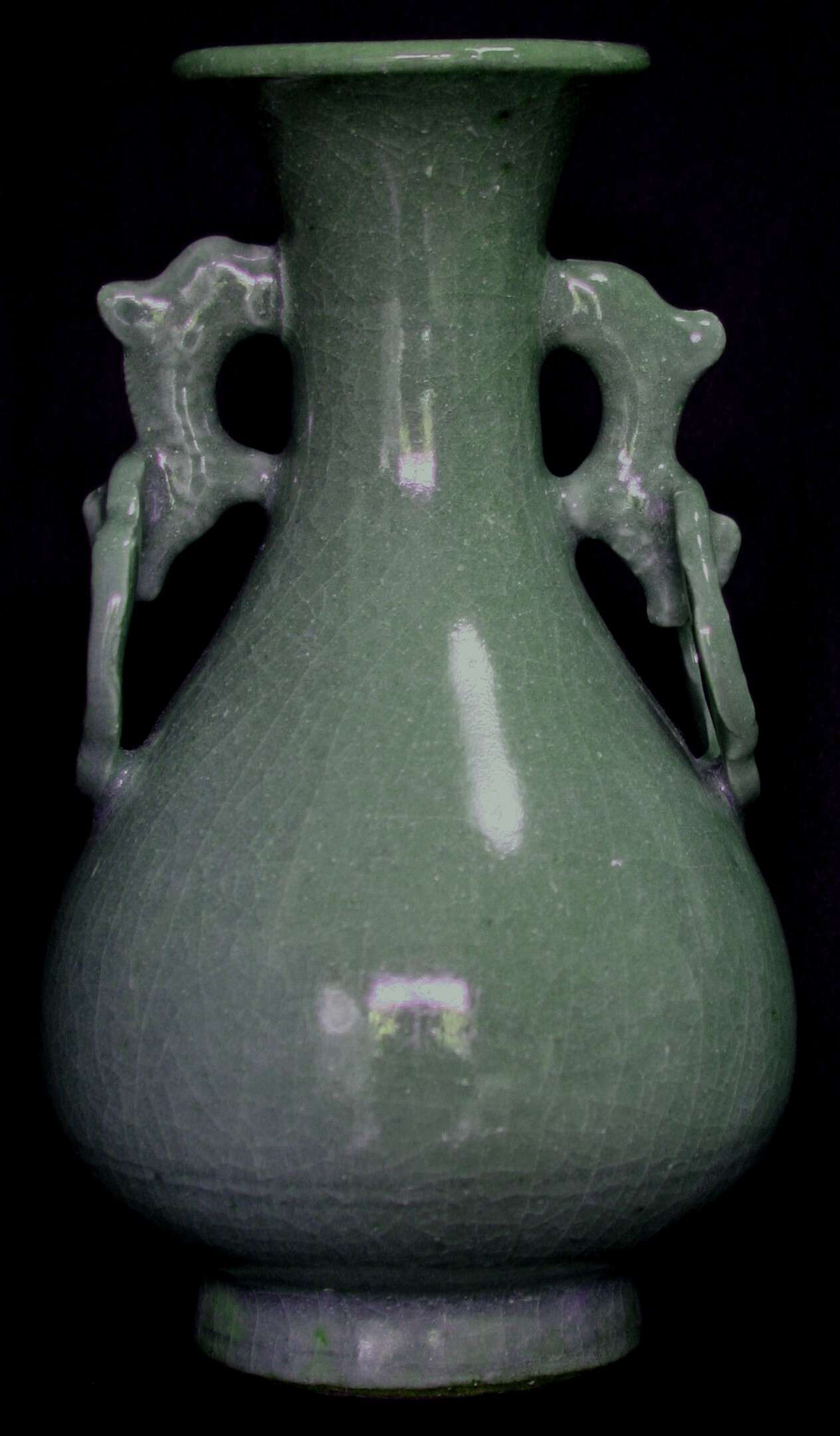
- Chinese Longquan celadon from Zhejiang, Song dynasty, 13th century
- Traditional Chinese: 青瓷
- Simplified Chinese: 青瓷
- Literal meaning: "blue-green porcelain"
Transcriptions
Standard Mandarin
- Hanyu Pinyin: qīngcí
- IPA: [tɕʰíŋtsʰɹ̩̌]
Yue: Cantonese
- Yale Romanization: chēngchìh
- Jyutping: ceng1-ci4
- IPA: [tsʰɛŋ˥tsʰi˩]

Celadon (/ˈsɛlədɒn/) is a term for pottery denoting both wares glazed in the jade green celadon color, also known as greenware or "green ware" (the term specialists now tend to use), and a type of transparent glaze, often with small cracks, that was first used on greenware, but later used on other porcelains. Celadon originated in China, though the term is purely European, and notable kilns such as the Longquan kiln in Zhejiang province are renowned for their celadon glazes. Celadon production later spread to other parts of East Asia, such as Japan and Korea, as well as Southeast Asian countries, such as Thailand and Vietnam. Eventually, European potteries produced some pieces, but it was never a major element there. Finer pieces are in porcelain, but both the color and the glaze can be produced in stoneware and earthenware. Most of the earlier Longquan celadon is on the border of stoneware and porcelain, meeting the Chinese but not the European definitions of porcelain.

For many centuries, celadon wares were highly regarded by the Chinese imperial court, before being replaced in fashion by painted wares, especially the new blue and white porcelain under the Yuan dynasty. The similarity of the color to jade, traditionally the most highly valued material in China, was a large part of its attraction. Celadon continued to be produced in China at a lower level, often with a conscious sense of reviving older styles. In Korea, the celadon produced during Goryeo period (918–1392) are regarded as classic wares of Korean porcelain.

The celadon color is classically produced by firing a glaze containing a little iron oxide at a high temperature in a reducing kiln. The materials must be refined, as other chemicals can alter the color completely. Too little iron oxide causes a blue color (sometimes a desired effect), and too much gives olive and finally black; the right amount is between 0.75% and 2.5%. The presence of other chemicals may have effects; titanium dioxide gives a yellowish tinge.

== Etymology ==
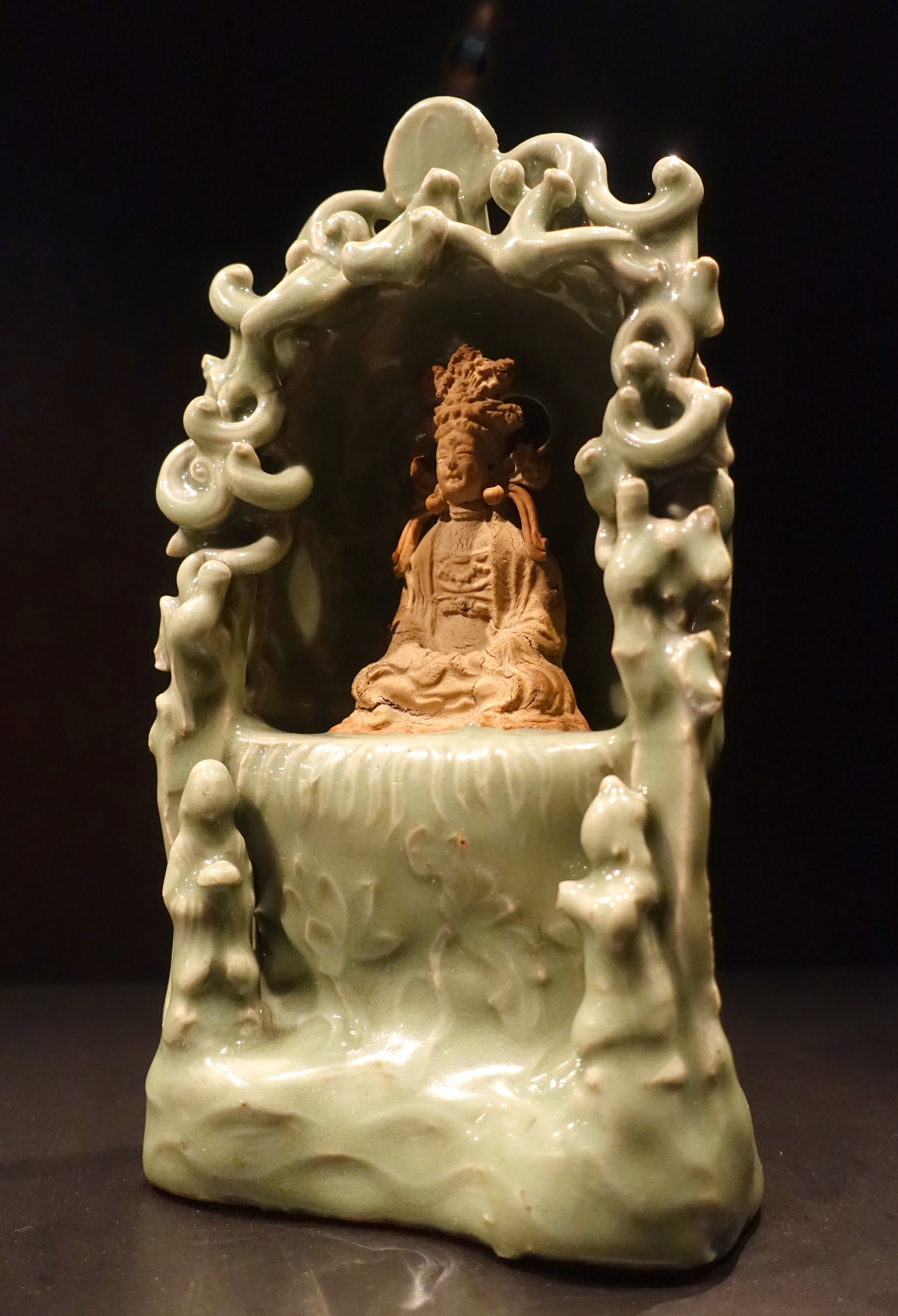
Ming shrine, the figure left unglazed in the "biscuit" state

The term "celadon" for the pottery's pale jade-green glaze was coined by European connoisseurs of the wares. The most commonly accepted theory is that the term first appeared in France in the 17th century as céladon, and that it is named after the shepherd Céladon in Honoré d'Urfé's pastoral romance L'Astrée (1627), who wore pale green ribbons. (D'Urfé, in turn, borrowed his character from Ovid's Metamorphoses V.144.) Another theory is that the term is a corruption of the name of Saladin (Salah ad-Din), the Ayyubid Sultan, who in 1171 sent forty pieces of the ceramic to Nur ad-Din Zengi, Sultan of Syria.

== Production and characteristics ==
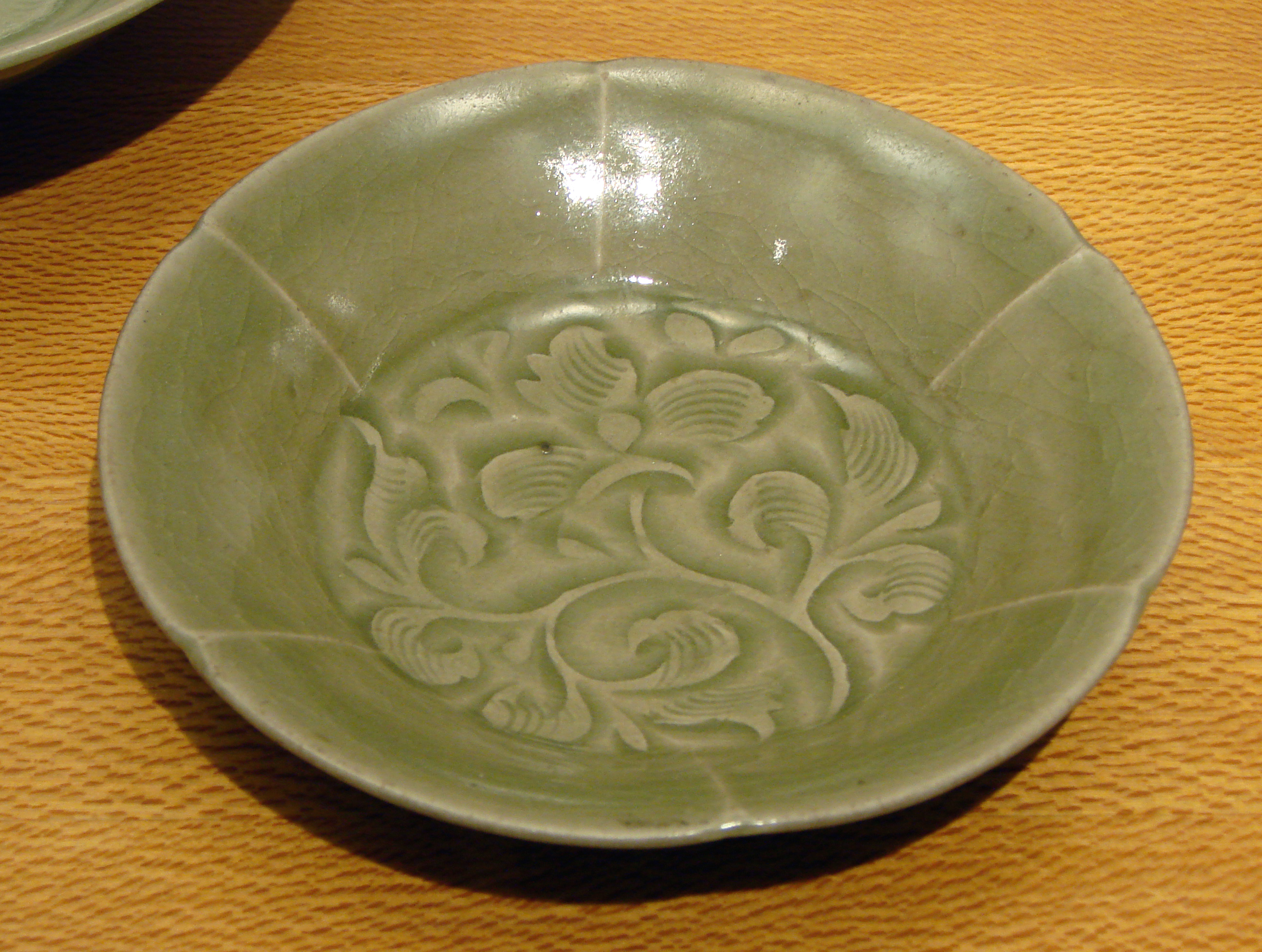
Yaozhou ware bowl with carved and combed decoration, Northern Song dynasty

Celadon glaze refers to a family of usually partly transparent but colored glazes, many with pronounced (and sometimes accentuated) "crackle", or tiny cracks in the glaze produced in a wide variety of colors, generally used on stoneware or porcelain pottery bodies.

So-called "true celadon", which requires a minimum 1,260 °C (2,300 °F) furnace temperature, a preferred range of 1,285 to 1,305 °C (2,340 to 2,380 °F), and firing in a reducing atmosphere, originated at the beginning of the Northern Song dynasty (960–1127), at least on one strict definition. The unique grey or green celadon glaze is a result of iron oxide's transformation from ferric to ferrous iron (Fe_{2}O_{3} → FeO) during the firing process. Individual pieces in a single firing can have significantly different colors, from small variations in conditions in different parts of the kiln. Most of the time, green was the desired color, reminding the Chinese of jade, always the most valued material in Chinese culture.

Celadon glazes can be produced in a variety of colors, including white, grey, blue and yellow, depending on several factors:

1. the thickness of the applied glaze,
2. the type of clay to which it is applied,
3. the exact chemical makeup of the glaze,
4. the firing temperature
5. the degree of reduction in the kiln atmosphere and
6. the degree of opacity in the glaze.

The most famous and desired shades range from a very pale green to deep intense green, often meaning to mimic the green shades of jade. The main color effect is produced by iron oxide in the glaze recipe or clay body. Celadons are almost exclusively fired in a reducing atmosphere kiln as the chemical changes in the iron oxide which accompany depriving it of free oxygen are what produce the desired colors.

== East Asia ==
=== Chinese celadons ===
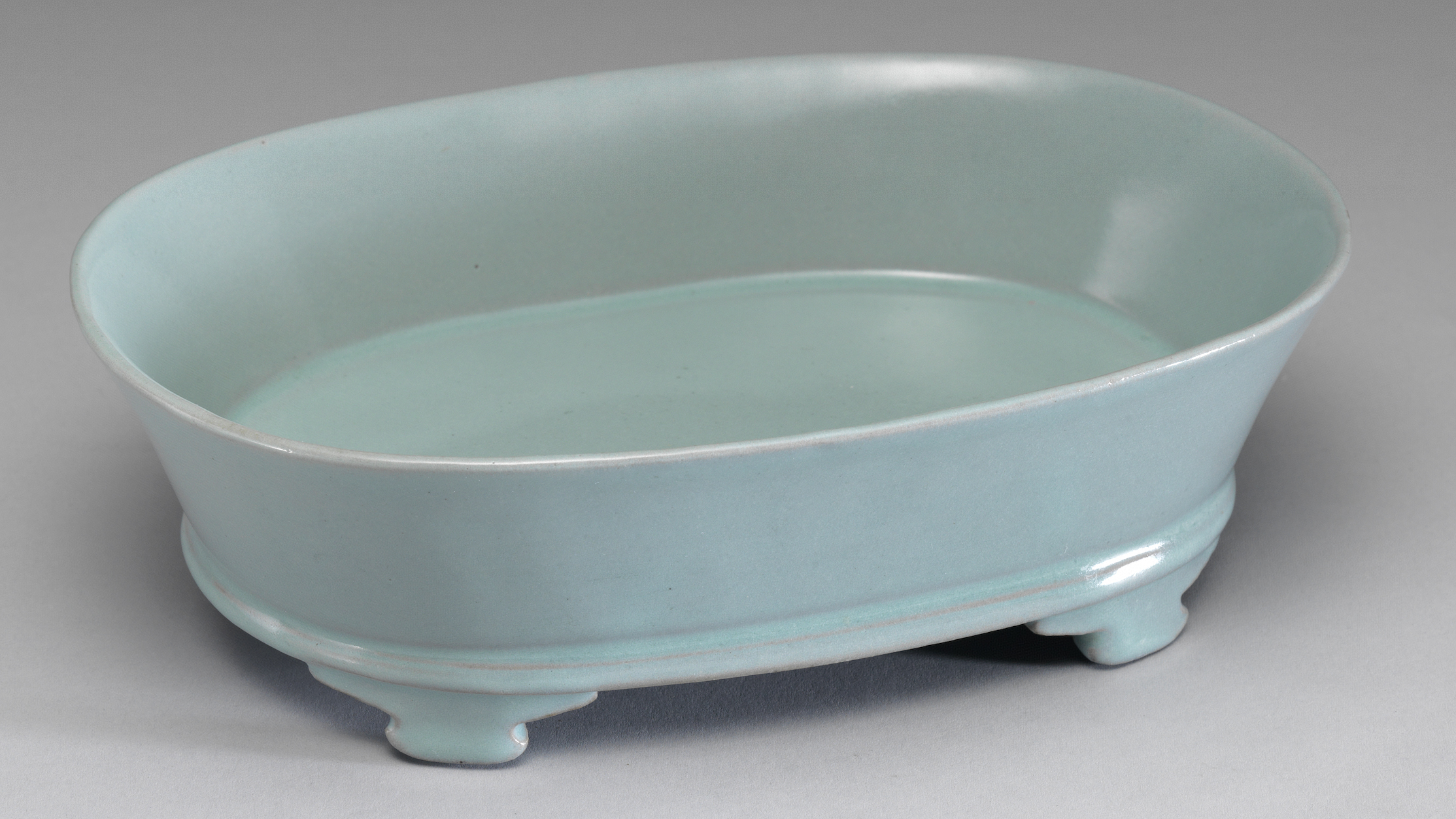
Narcissus basin with light bluish-green glaze, Ru ware, National Palace Museum

Greenwares are found in earthenware from the Shang dynasty onwards. Archaeologist Wang Zhongshu states that shards with a celadon ceramic glaze have been recovered from Eastern Han dynasty (25–220 CE) tomb excavations in Zhejiang, and that this type of ceramic became well known during the Three Kingdoms (220–265). These are now often called proto-celadons, and tend to browns and yellows, without much green.

The earliest major type of celadon was Yue ware, which was succeeded by a number of kilns in north China producing wares known as Northern Celadons, sometimes used by the imperial court. The best known of these is Yaozhou ware. All these types were already widely exported to the rest of East Asia and the Islamic world.

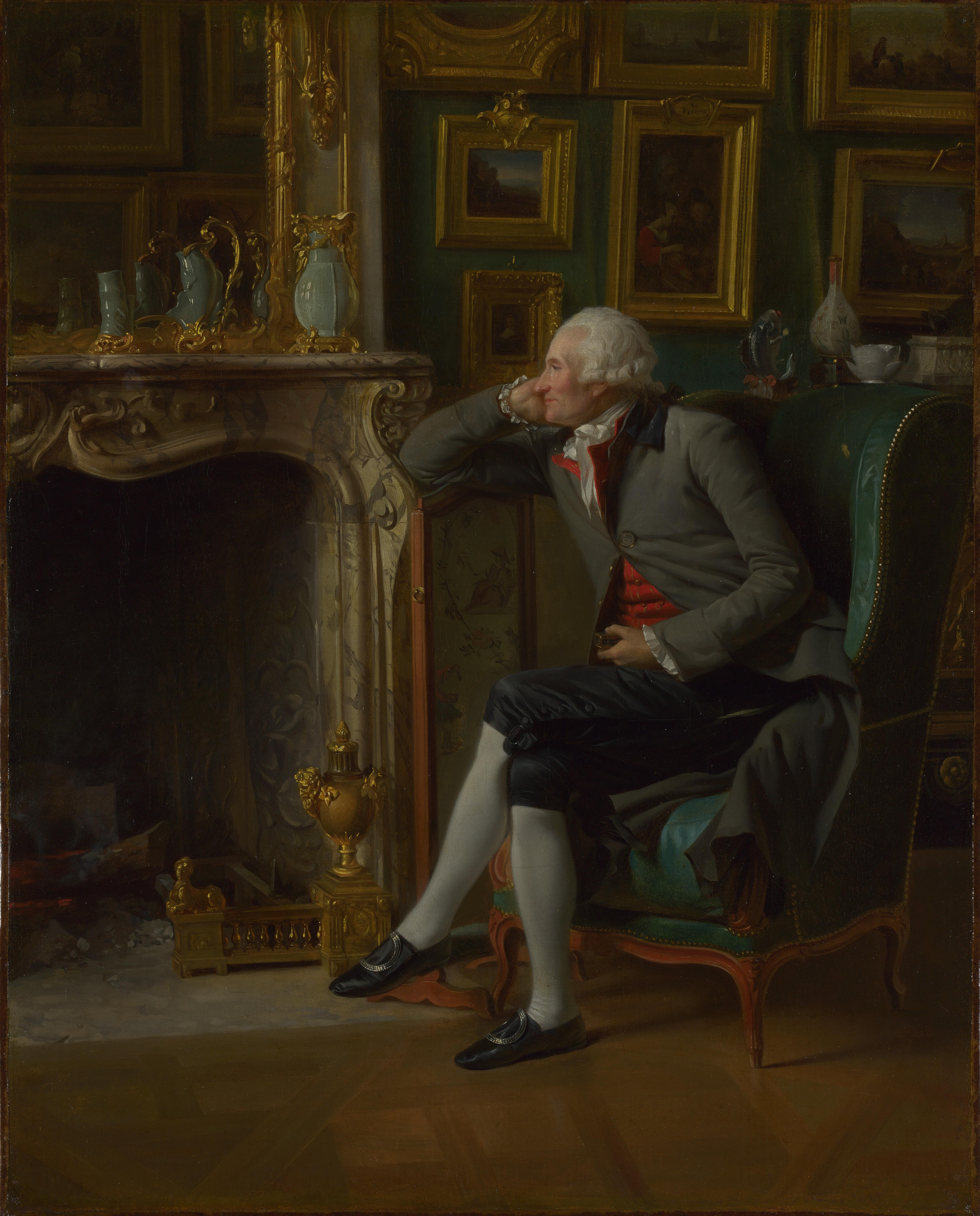
Le Baron de Besenval dans salon de compagnie at the Hôtel de Besenval, a portrait of the baron by Henri-Pierre Danloux (1791). The green Chinese celadon vases mounted in gilt bronze, which are visible on the mantelpiece, were sold together with their identical pendants in three lots by Christie's on 8 July 2021 in The Exceptional Sale for a total of GB£1,620,000.

Longquan celadon wares were first made during the Northern Song, but flourished under the Southern Song, as the capital moved to the south and the northern kilns declined. This had bluish, blue-green, and olive green glazes and the bodies increasingly had high silica and alkali contents which resembled later porcelain wares made at Jingdezhen and Dehua rather than stonewares.

All the wares mentioned above were mostly in, or aiming to be in, some shade of green. Other wares which can be classified as celadons, were more often in shades of pale blue, very highly valued by the Chinese, or various browns and off-whites. These were often the most highly regarded at the time and by later Chinese connoisseurs, and sometimes made more or less exclusively for the court. These include Ru ware, Guan ware and Ge ware, as well as earlier types such as the "secret color" (mi se) wares, finally identified when the crypt at the Famen Temple was opened.

Large quantities of Longquan celadon were exported throughout East Asia, Southeast Asia and the Middle East in the 13th–15th century. Large celadon dishes were especially welcomed in Islamic nations. Since about 1420 the Counts of Katzenelnbogen have owned the oldest European import of celadon, reaching Europe indirectly via the Islamic world. This is a cup mounted in metal in Europe, and exhibited in Kassel in the Landesmuseum. After the development of blue and white porcelain in Jingdezhen ware in the early 14th century, celadon gradually went out of fashion in both Chinese and export markets, and after about 1500 both the quality and quantity of production was much reduced, though there were some antiquarian revivals of celadon glazes on Jingdezhen porcelain in later centuries.

Decoration in Chinese celadons is normally only by shaping the body or creating shallow designs on the flat surface which allow the glaze to pool in depressions, giving a much deeper color to accentuate the design. In both methods carving, moulding and a range of other techniques may be used. There is very rarely any contrast with a completely different color, except where parts of a piece are sometimes left as unglazed biscuit in Longquan celadon.

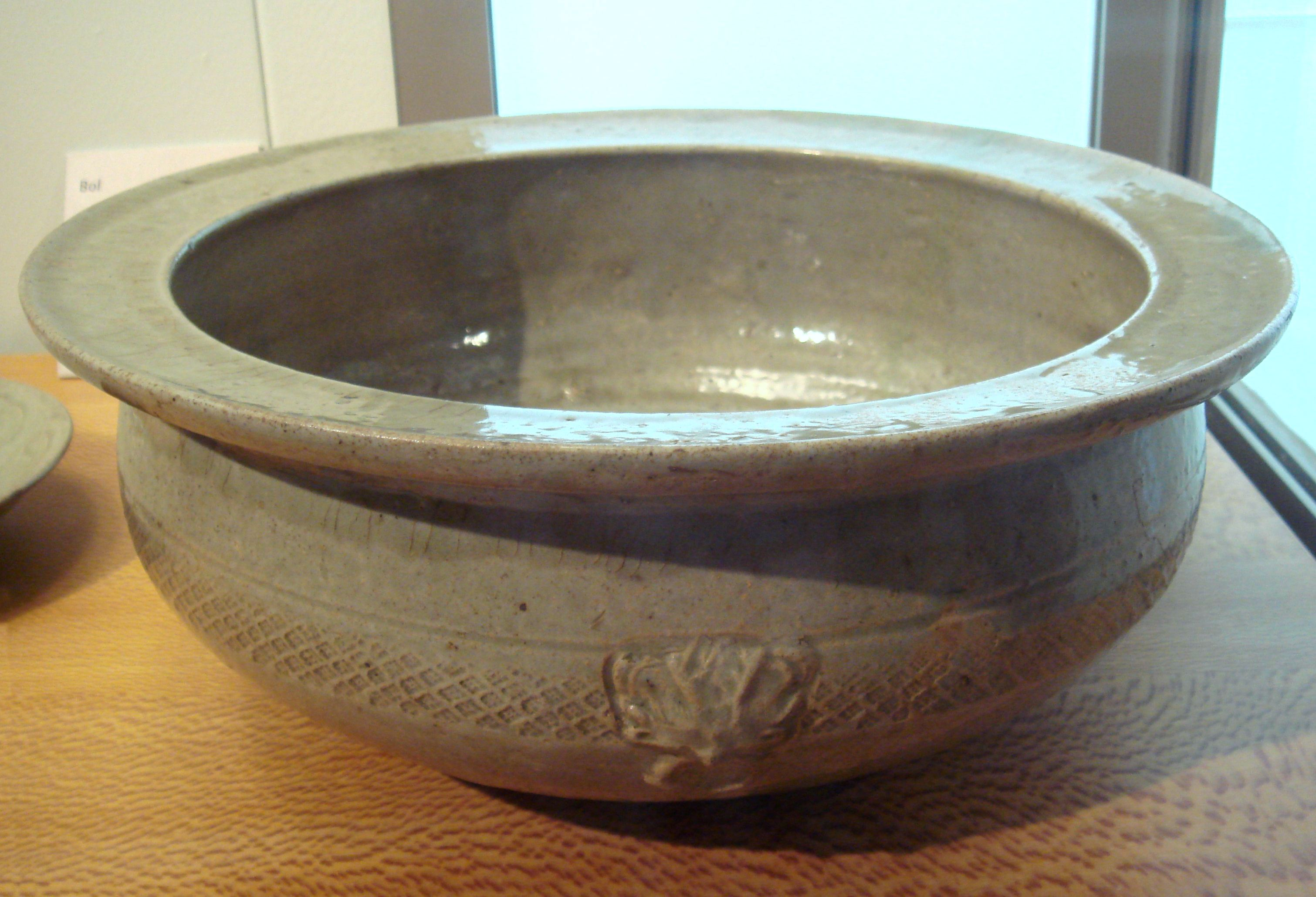
Yue ware bowl, 3rd century CE, Western Jin, Zhejiang

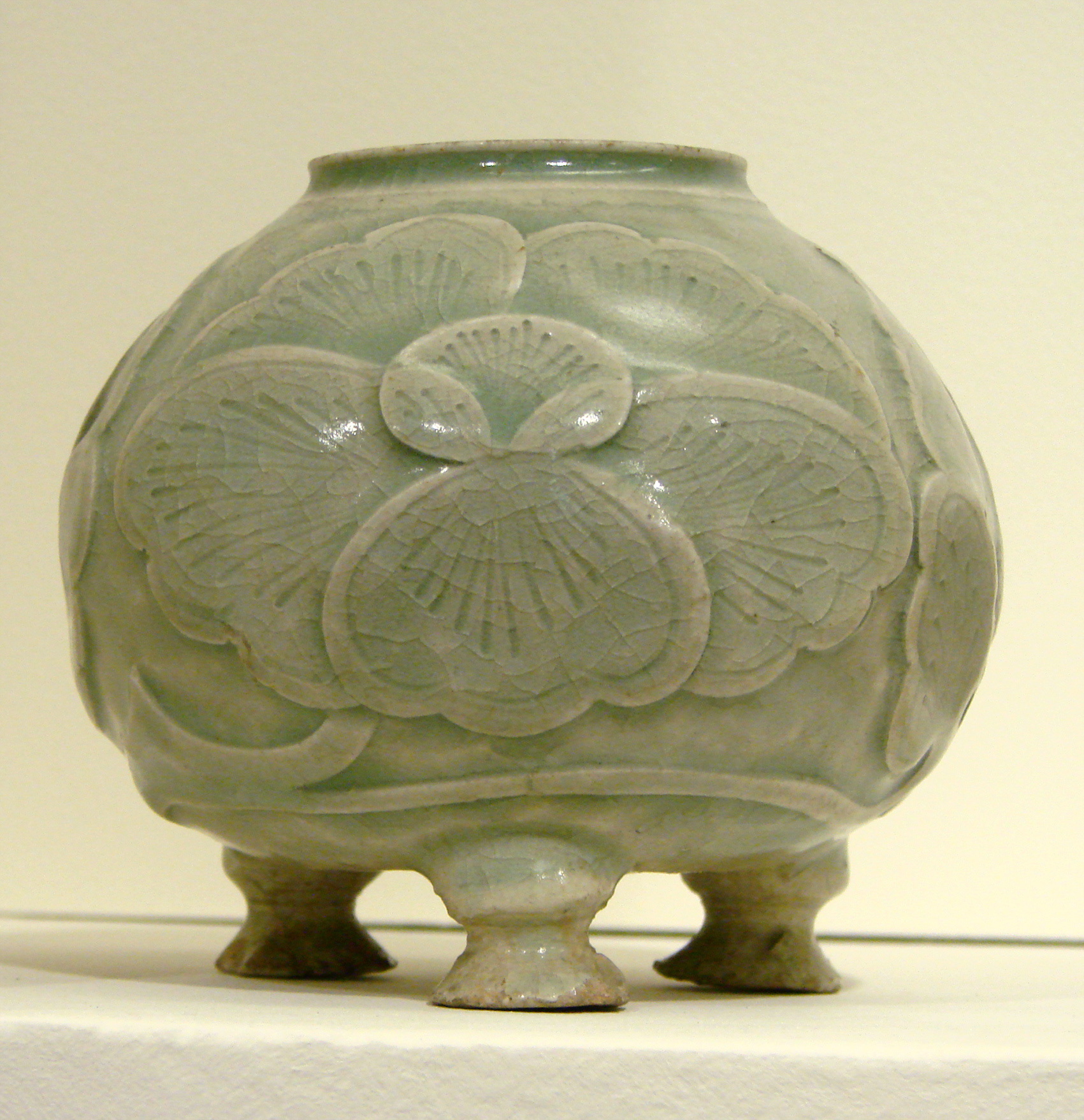
Yaozhou ware (Northern Celadon), with carved and engraved decoration, 10th century

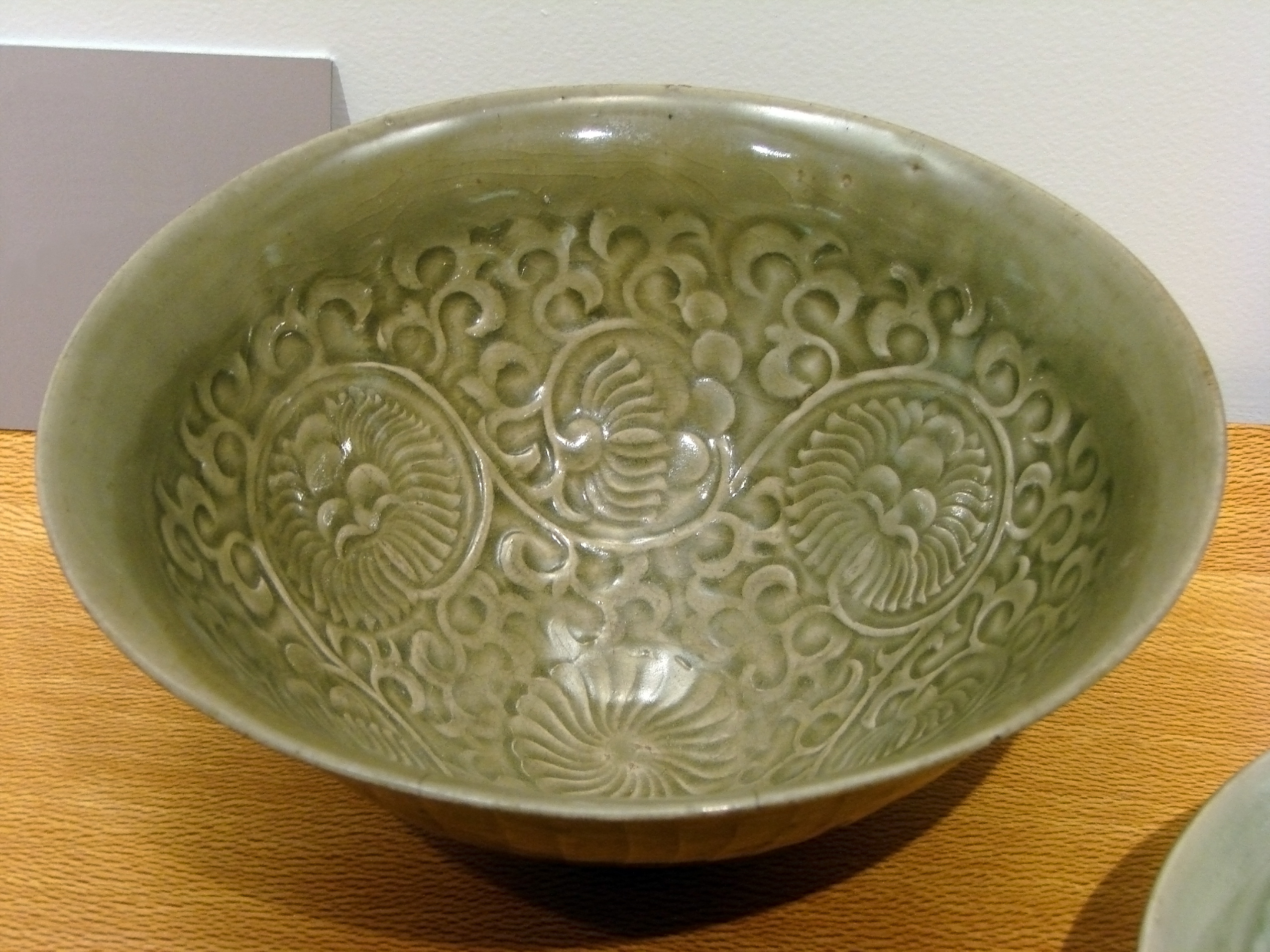
Yaozhou ware, Shaanxi province, Song dynasty, 10th–11th century

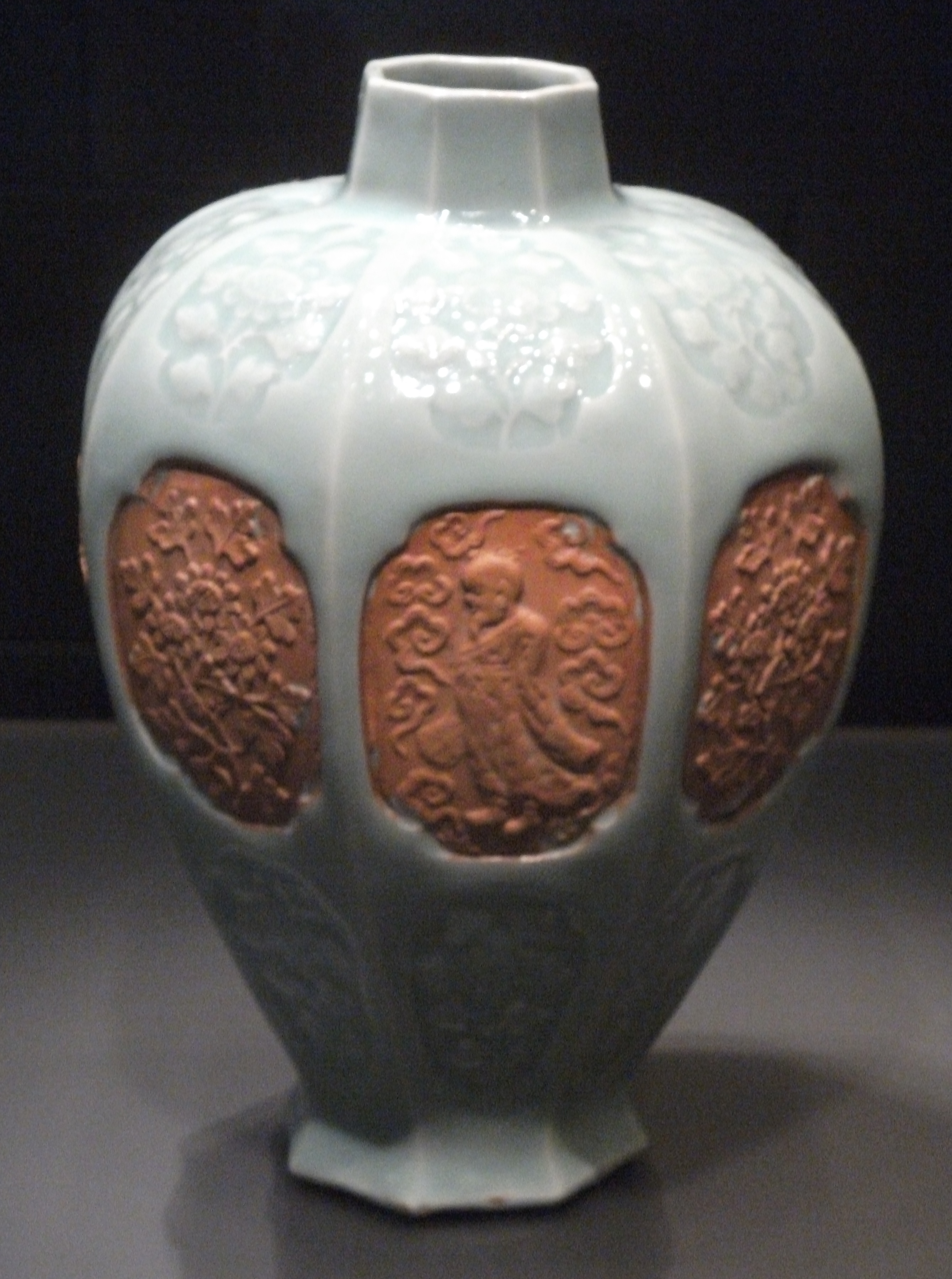
Centre areas left unglazed in 'biscuit state', 14th century

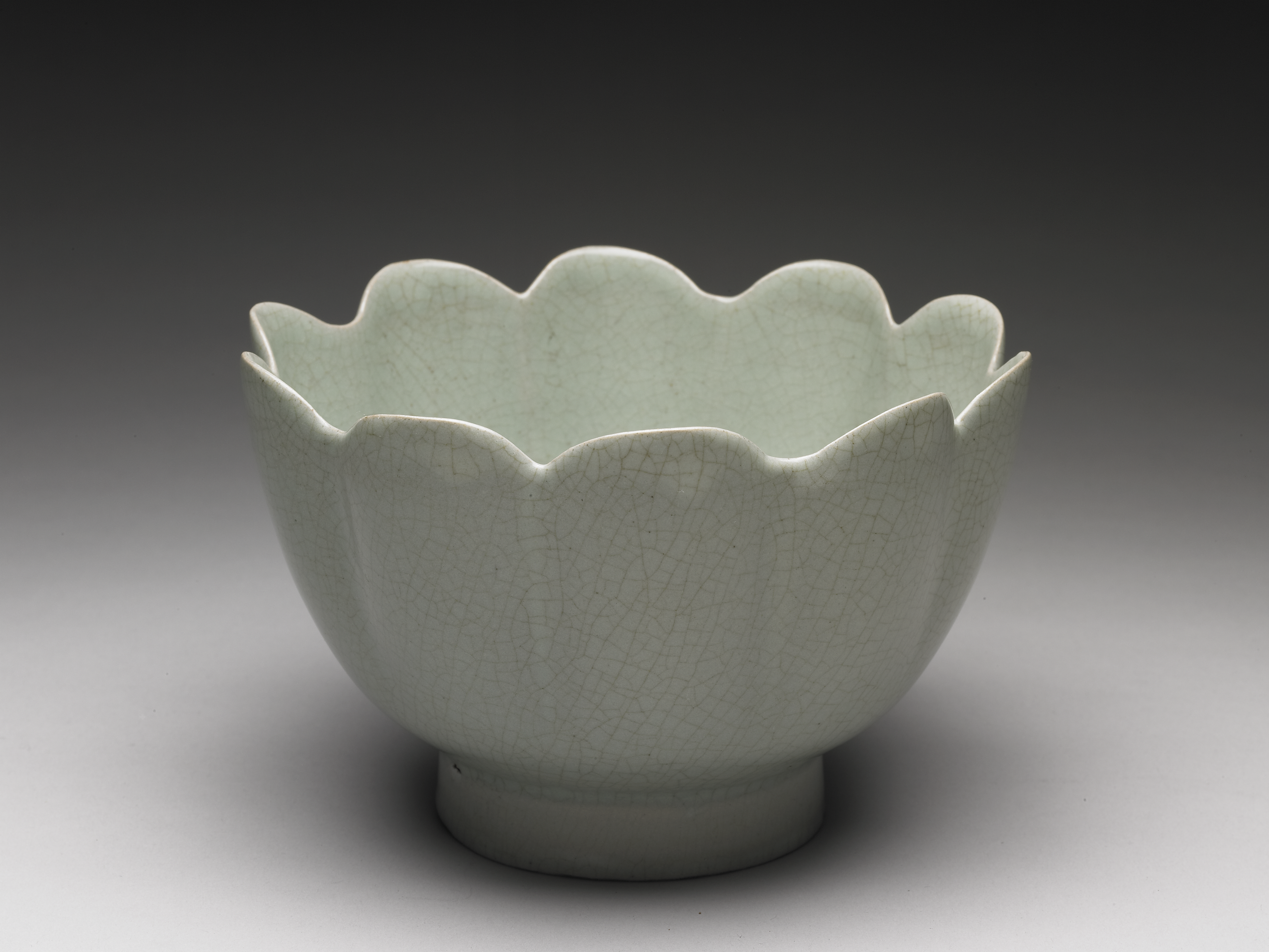
Warming Bowl in the Shape of a Flower with Light Bluish-green Glaze, Ru ware

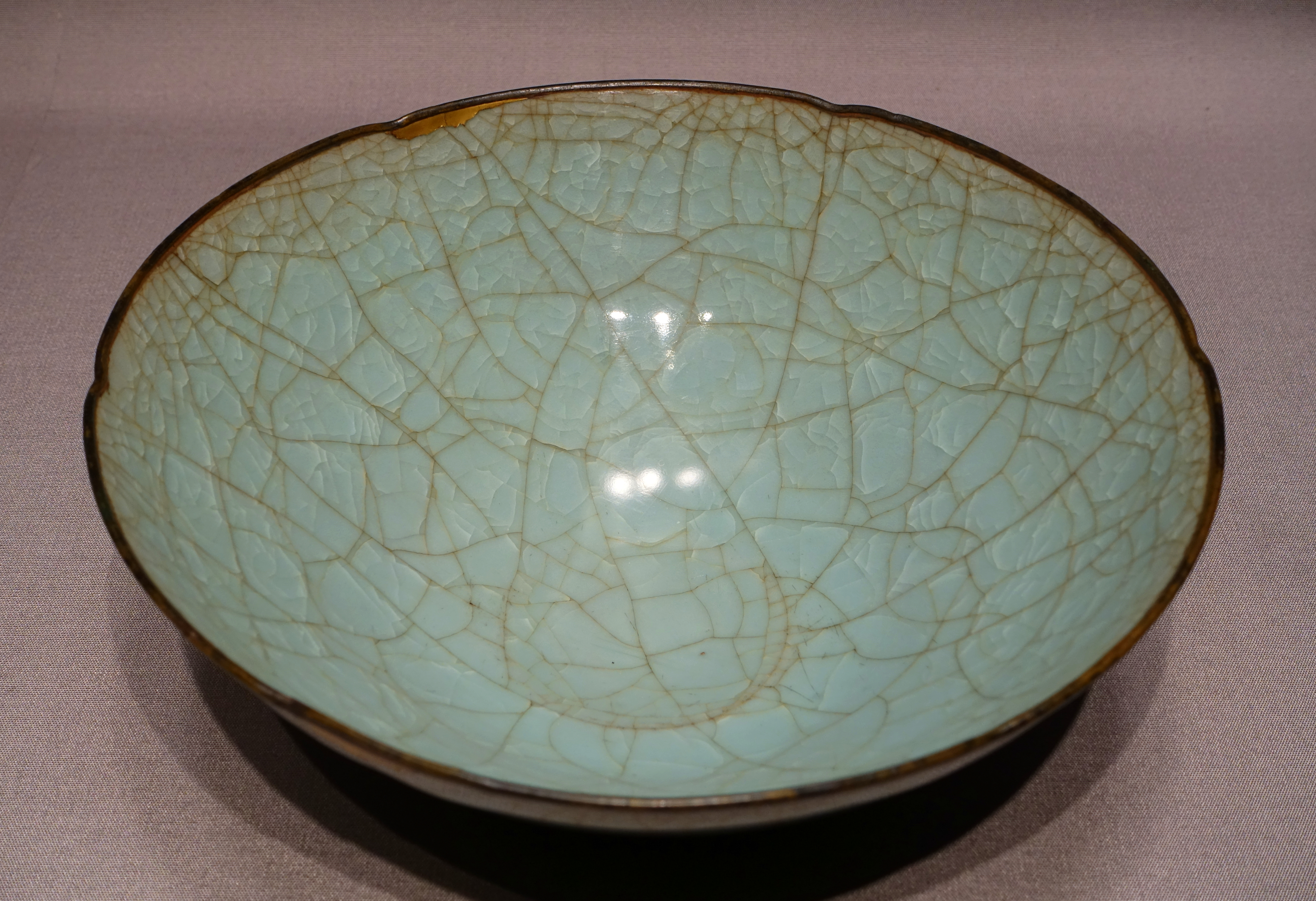
Guan ware, Southern Song dynasty, 1100s–1200s CE

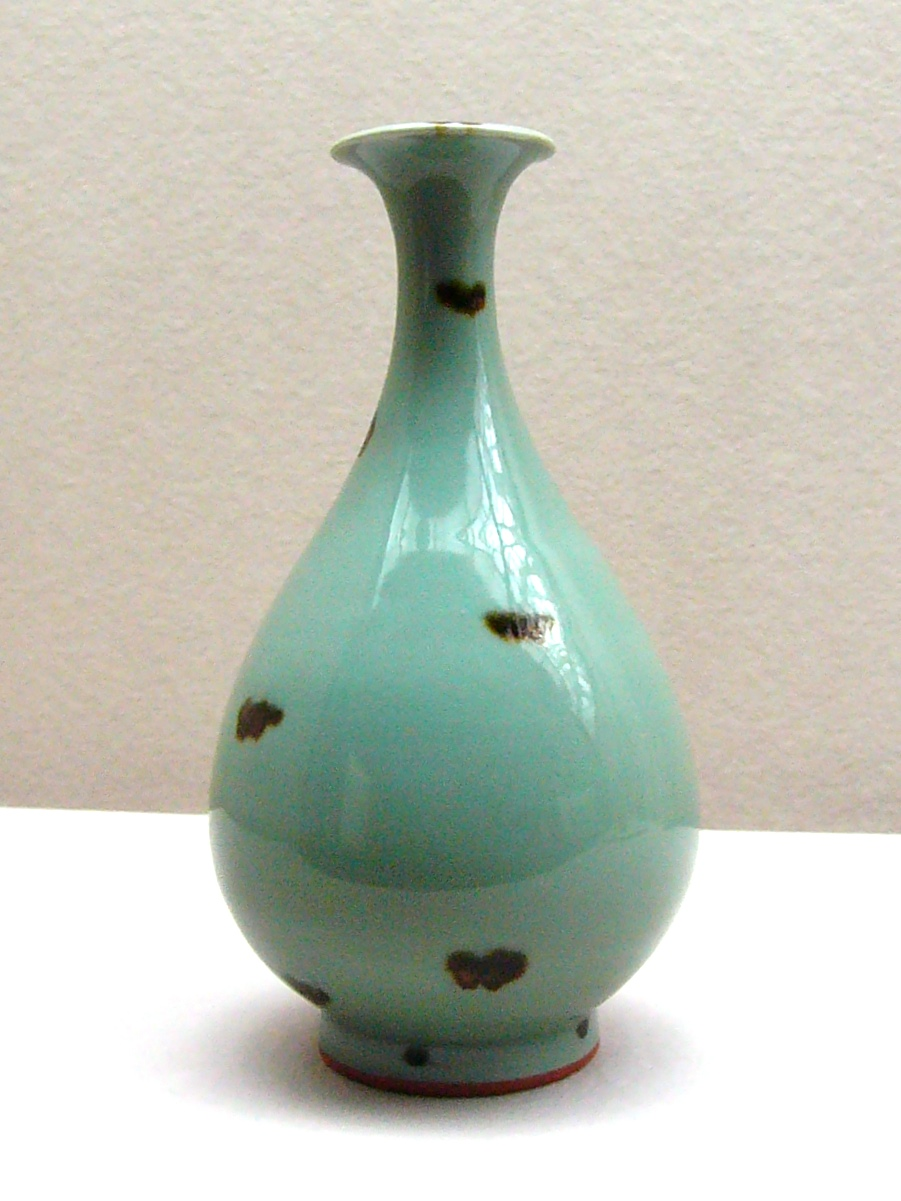
Flower vase with Iron Brown Spots (飛青磁花生), Longquan kiln, Yuan dynasty, 13–14th century (National Treasure)

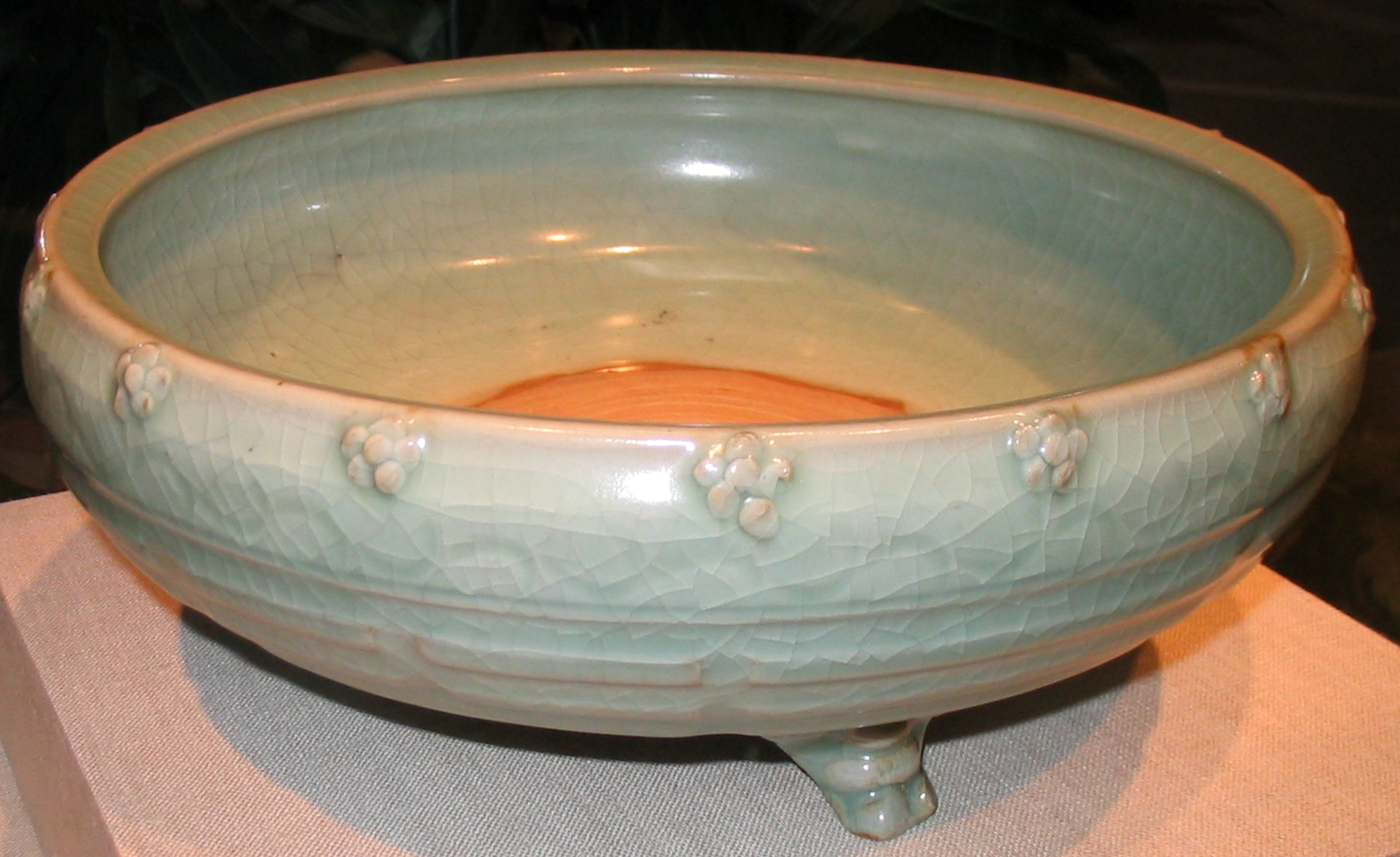
Longquan celadon from Zhejiang, Ming dynasty, 14–15th century

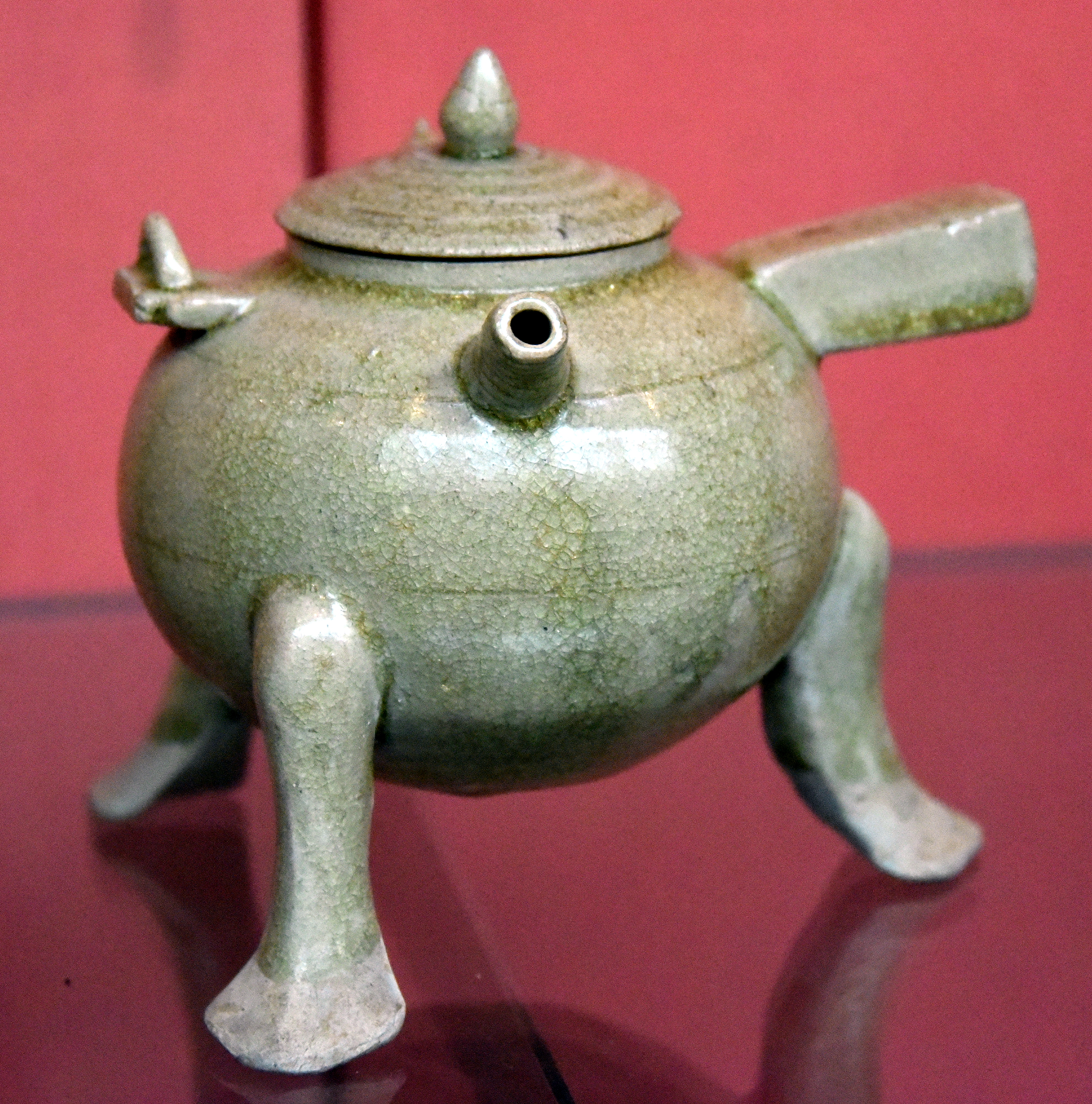
Ewer, lidded tripod with handles, used for heating certain alcoholic drinks. Stoneware with pale green (celadon) glaze. Six Dynasties, 500–580 CE. Victoria and Albert Museum, London

=== Japanese celadons ===
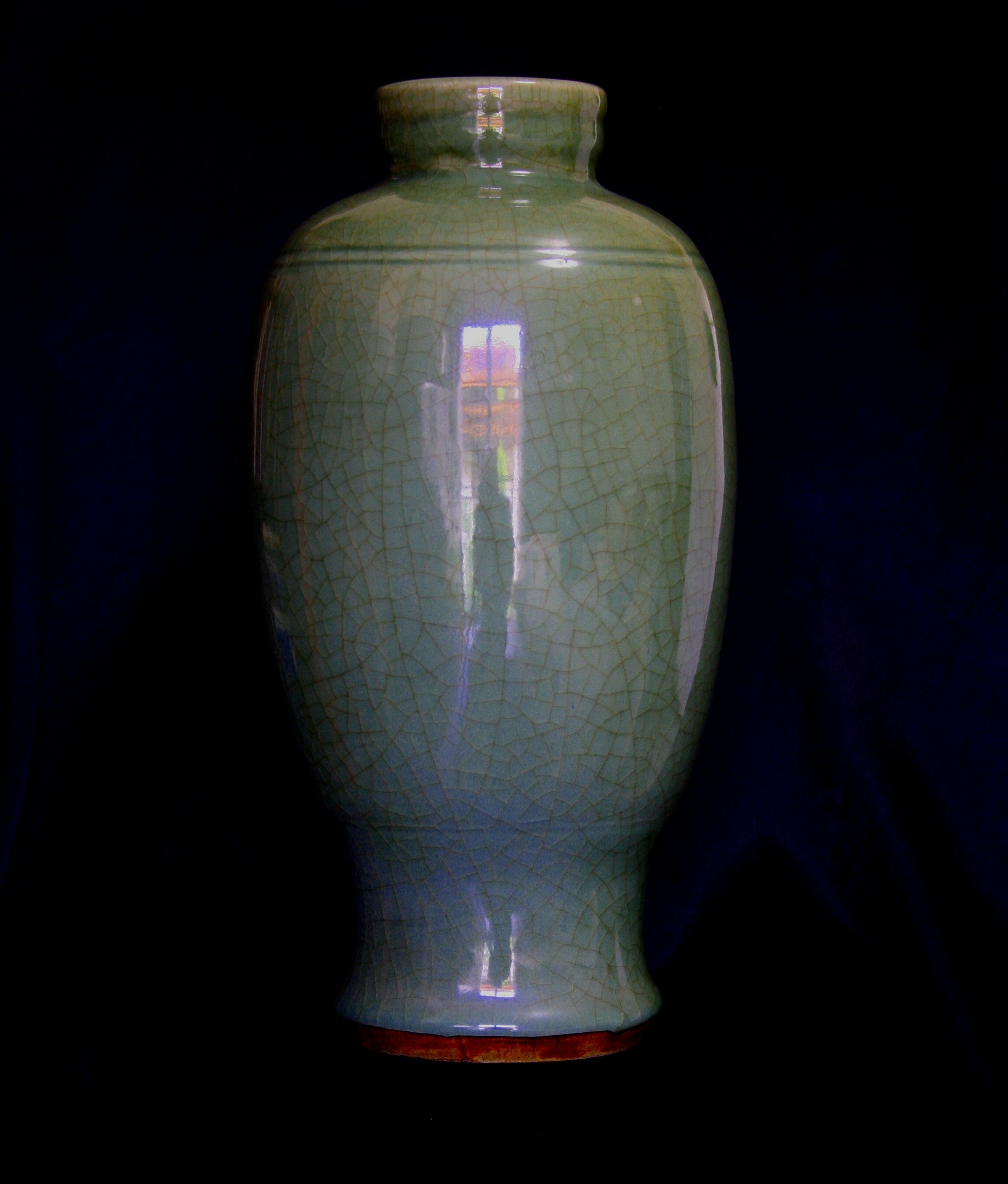
Kyō ware vase, 19th century

The Japanese pronunciation of the Chinese characters for greenware is seiji (青磁). It was introduced during the Song dynasty (960–1270) from China and via Korea. Even though Japan has arguably the most diverse styles of ceramic art in the modern era, greenware was mostly avoided by potters because of the high loss rate of up to 80%. Kaolinite, the ceramic material usually used for the production of porcelain, also does not exist in large quantities like in China. One of the sources for kaolin in Japan is from Amakusa in Kyushu. Nevertheless, a number of artists emerged whose works received critical acclaim in regards to the quality and color of the glazes achieved, as well as later on in the innovation of modern design.

Three pieces originally from China have been registered by the government as national treasures. They are two flower vases from the Longquan kiln dating to the southern Song dynasty in the 13th century, and a flower vase with iron brown spots also from Longquan kiln dating to the Yuan dynasty in the 13–14th century.

Production in the style of Longquan was centered around Arita, Saga and in the Saga Domain under the lords of the Nabeshima clan. Greenware is also closed entwined with hakuji (白磁) white porcelain. The glaze with a mixed subtle color gradations of icy, bluish white is called seihakuji (青白磁) porcelain. In Chinese this type of glaze is known as Qingbai ware. Qingbai's history goes back to the Song dynasty. It is bisque-fired and painted with a glaze containing small amounts of iron. This turns a bluish color when fired again. Japanese artists and clients tend to favor the seihakuji bluish white glaze over the completely green glaze.

Pieces that are produced are normally tea or rice bowls, sake cups, vases, and plates, and mizusashi water jars for tea ceremony, censers and boxes. Some post-modern ceramic artists have however expanded into the area of sculpture and abstract art as well.

Artists from the early Showa era are Itaya Hazan (1872–1963), Tomimoto Kenkichi (1886–1963), Kato Hajme (1900–1968), Tsukamoto Kaiji (塚本快示) (1912–1990), and Okabe Mineo (1919–1990), who specialized in Guan ware with its crackled glaze. Tsukamoto Kaiji was nominated a Living National Treasure in 1983 for his works in seihakuji. Artists from the mid- to late Showa era were Shimizu Uichi (1926–?), who also specialized in crackled glaze, Suzuki Osamu (1926–2001), Miura Koheiji (1933–?), Suzuki Sansei (b. 1936), Fukami Sueharu (b. 1947), and Takenaka Ko (b. 1941). During the Heisei era artists are Masamichi Yoshikawa (b. 1946), Kawase Shinobu (b. 1950), Minegishi Seiko (b. 1952), Kubota Atsuko (b. 1953), Yagi Akira (b. 1955) and Kato Tsubusa (加藤委) (b. 1962).

Artists such as Fukami Sueharu, Masamichi Yoshikawa, and Kato Tsubusa also produce abstract pieces, and their works are part of a number of national and international museum collections. Kato Tsubusa works with kaolin from New Zealand.

=== Korean celadons ===
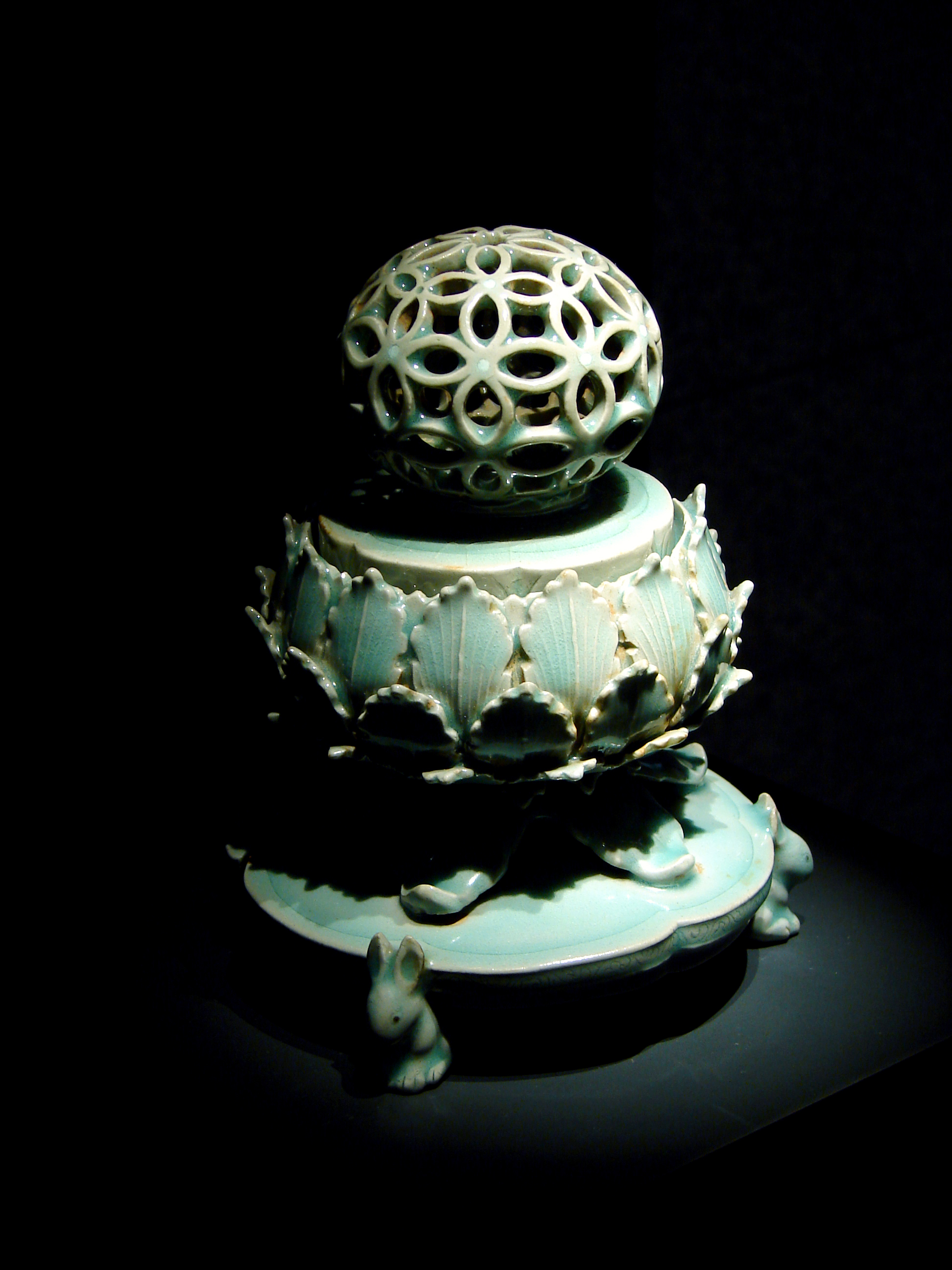
Censer with kingfisher glaze, Goryeo dynasty (National Treasure No. 95)

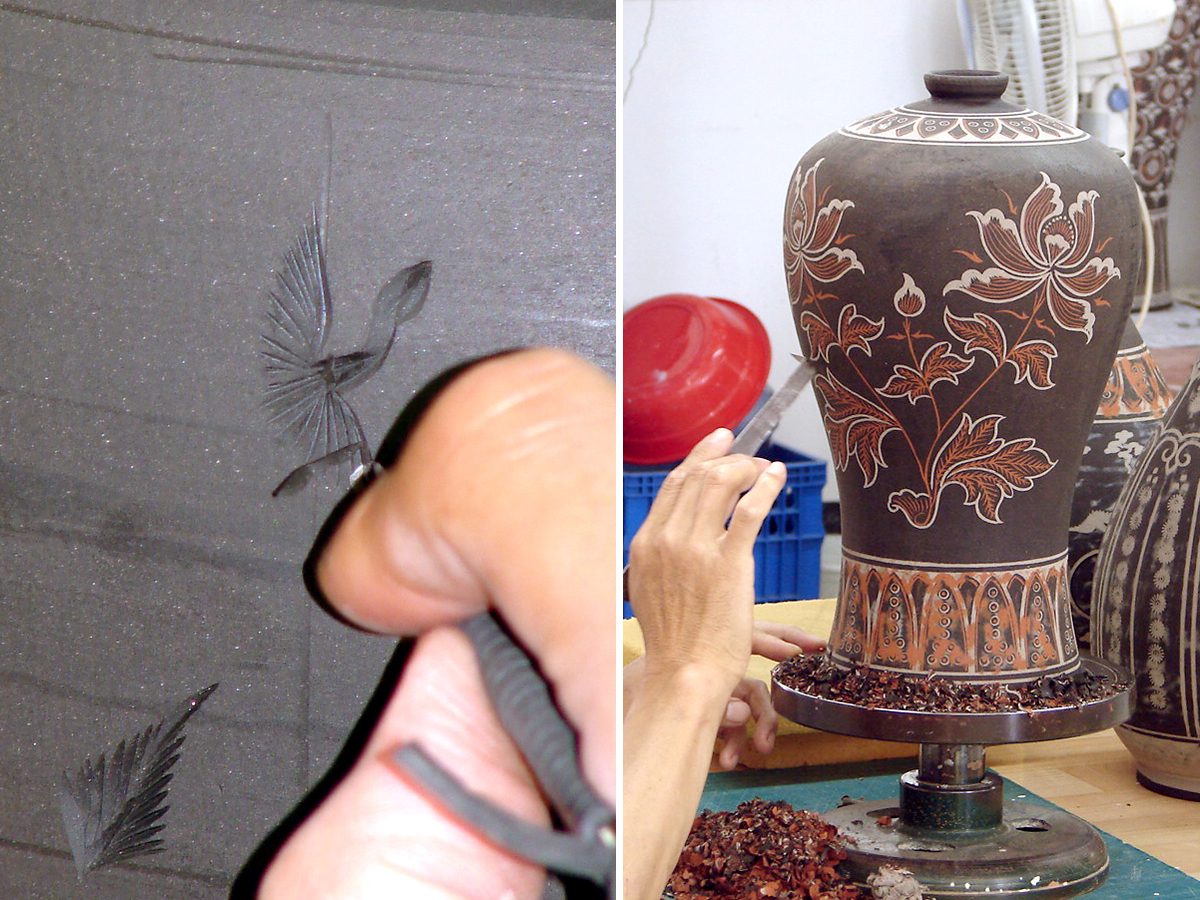
Sanggam engraving inlaid design of a crane (left), scraping off excess clay slip, used to fill in the engraving (right)

Korean celadon has its own tradition of greenware production, dating back to the Three Kingdoms period. Korea has a tradition of making jewels and crowns with jade in gogok shapes as a symbol of creativity, universe, divinity, and leadership. Chinese greenwares inspired local potters as well. Exceptional high-quality celadons were produced in Korea during the Goryeo and Joseon dynasties. An inlaid greenware technique known as sanggam, where potters would engrave semi-dried pottery with designs and place black or white clay materials within the engraving, was invented in Korea during this time.

Korean greenware, also known as "Goryeo celadon", is usually a pale green-blue in color. The glaze was developed and refined during the 10th and 11th centuries during the Goryeo period, from which it derives its name. Korean greenware reached its zenith between the 12th and early 13th centuries, however, the Mongol invasions of Korea in the 13th century and persecution by the Joseon dynasty government destroyed the craft.

The Gangjin Kiln Sites produced a large number of Goryeo wares and were a complex of 188 kilns. The kiln sites are located in Gangjin County, South Jeolla Province near the sea. Mountains in the north provided the necessary raw materials such as firewood, kaolin and silicon dioxide for the master potters while a well established system of distribution transported pottery throughout Korea and facilitated export to China and Japan. The sites are tentatively listed as a World Heritage by the South Korean government. Celadon was used as a "spirit vessel" or Chy- Tang to summon spirits to bring positivity, in many Korean temples from the 14th century.

Traditional Korean greenware has distinctive decorative elements. The most distinctive are decorated by overlaying glaze on contrasting clay bodies. With inlaid designs, known as sanggam in Korean, small pieces of colored clay are inlaid in the base clay. Carved or slip-carved designs require layers of a different colored clay adhered to the base clay of the piece. The layers are then carved away to reveal the varying colors.

A number of items dating from the Goryeo dynasty have been registered by the government as a National Treasure of South Korea, such as a Dragon kettle from the 12th century (National Treasure No. 61), a maebyeong vase with sanggam engraved cranes (National Treasure No. 68), an elaborate censer with kingfisher glaze (National Treasure No. 95), and a pitcher in the shape of a Dragon Turtle (National Treasure No. 96).

Beginning in the early 20th century, potters, using modern materials and tools, attempted to recreate the techniques of ancient Korean Goyeo celadons. Playing a leading role in its revival was Yu Geun-Hyeong (유근형; 柳根瀅), a Living National Treasure whose work was documented in the 1979 short film, Koryo Celadon. Another notable potter and Living National Treasure was Ji Suntaku (1912–1993). Today, hundreds of potters showcase their work at the Icheon Ceramics Village, which features contemporary work from Sugwang-ri, Sindun-myeon, and Saeum-dong, Icheon.

In the late 20th century ceramists like Shin Sang-ho and Kim Se-yong created their own styles based upon traditional Goryeo ware. Kim came to prominence for his double-openwork his highly detailed which sometimes featured more than 1500 individually formed chrysanthemum flowers.

The National Museum of Korea in Seoul houses important celadon works and national treasures. The Haegang Ceramics Museum and the Goryeo Celadon Museum are two regional museums that focus on Korean greenware.

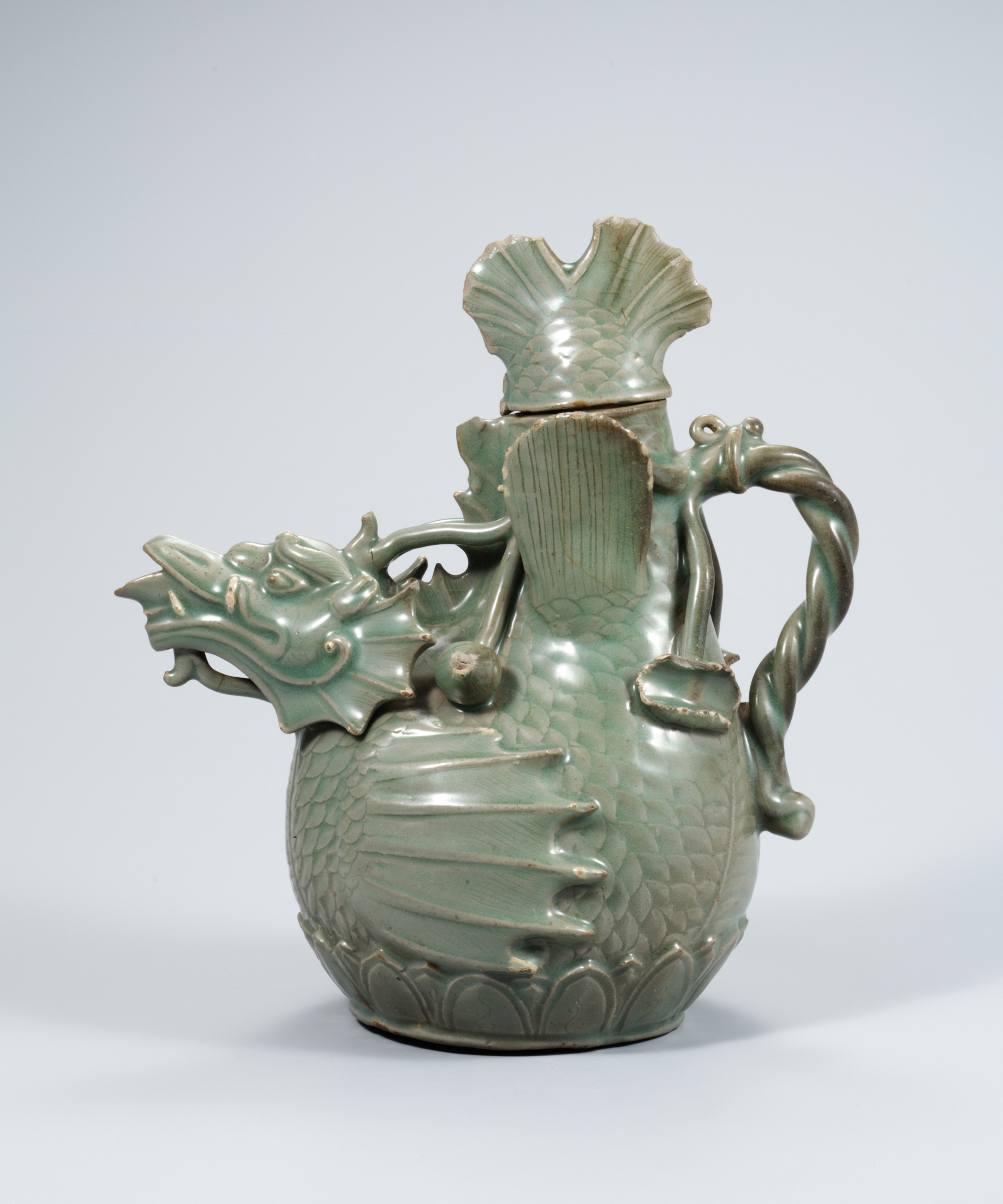
Dragon turtle kettle, Goryeo dynasty, 12th century (National Treasure No. 61)

Maebyeong vase with sanggam engraved cranes, hand carved 12th century Goryeo dynasty (National Treasure No. 68)

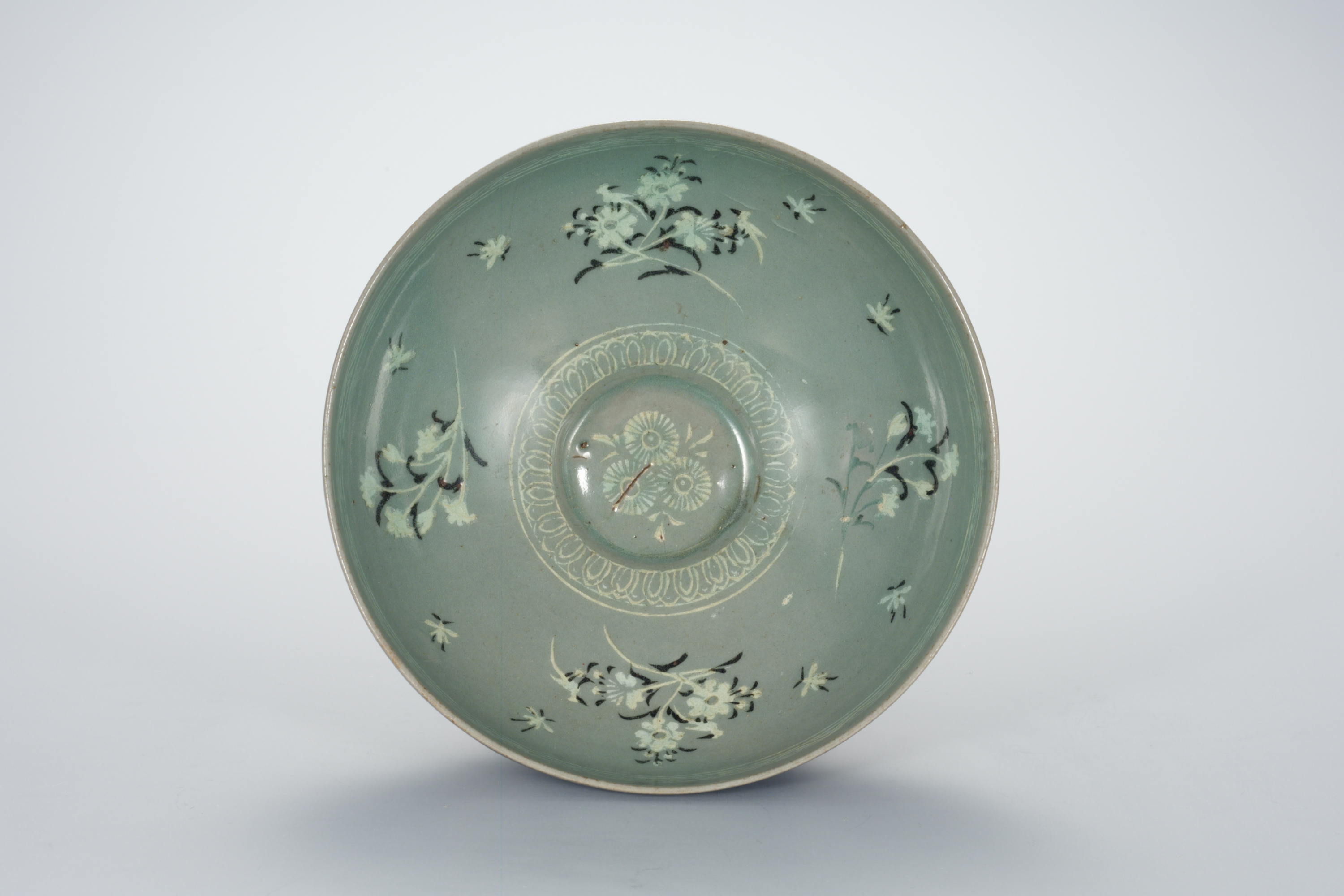
Goryeo dynasty bowl with sanggam inlay

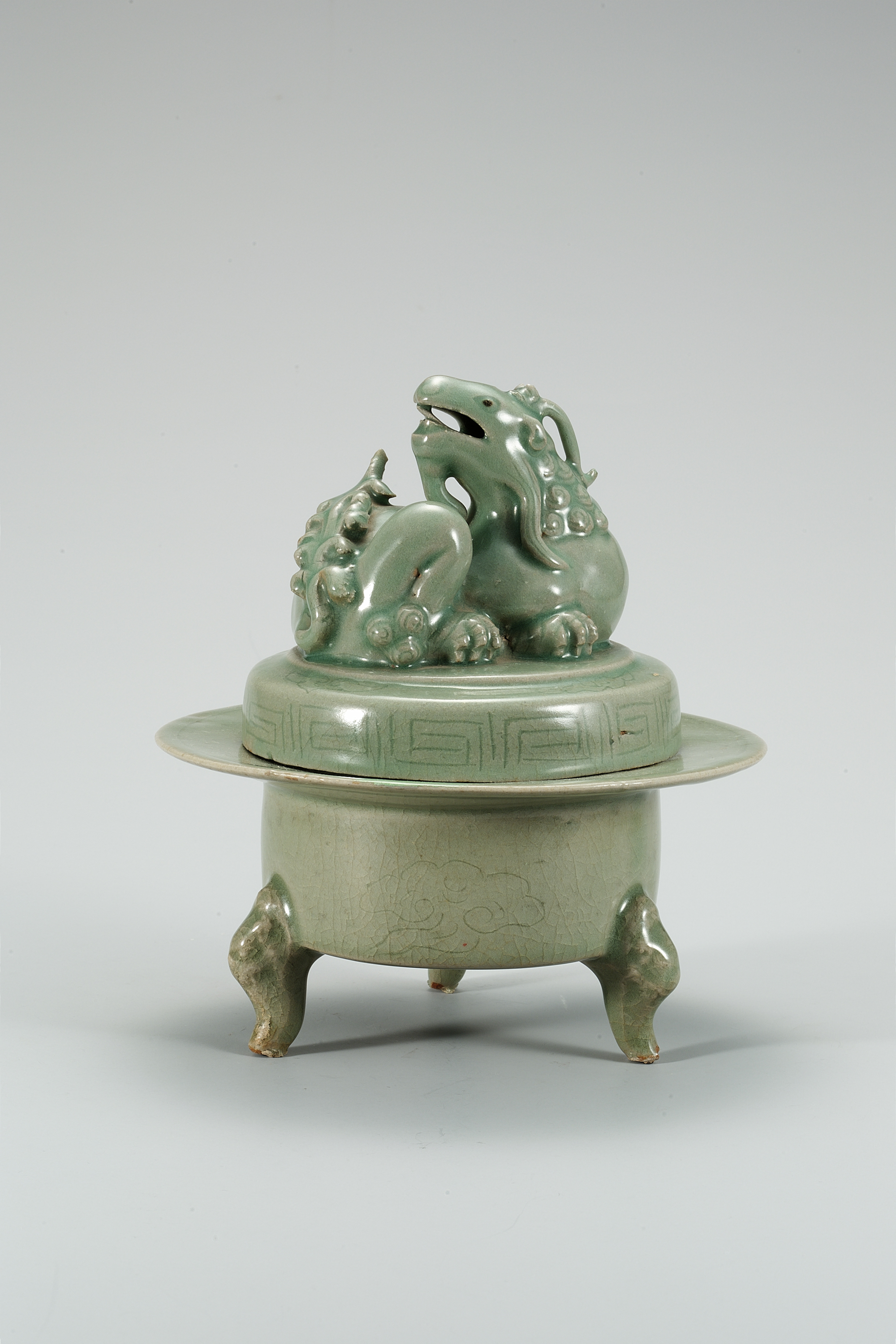
Goryeo celadon incense burner with Girin mystic sacred animal lid on it

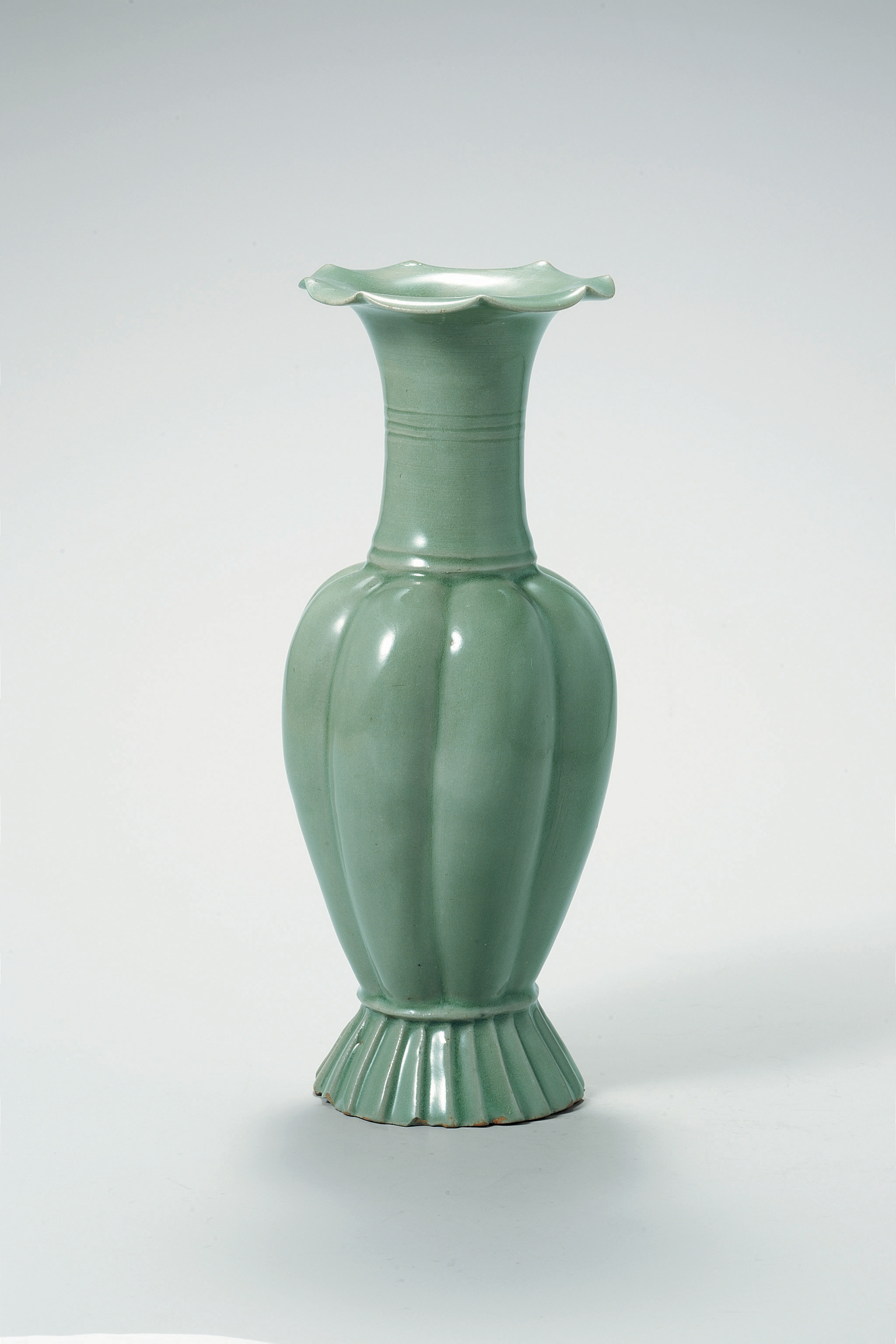
Goryeo celadon of Korean Chamoe (yellow water melon) shaped motif, 12th century

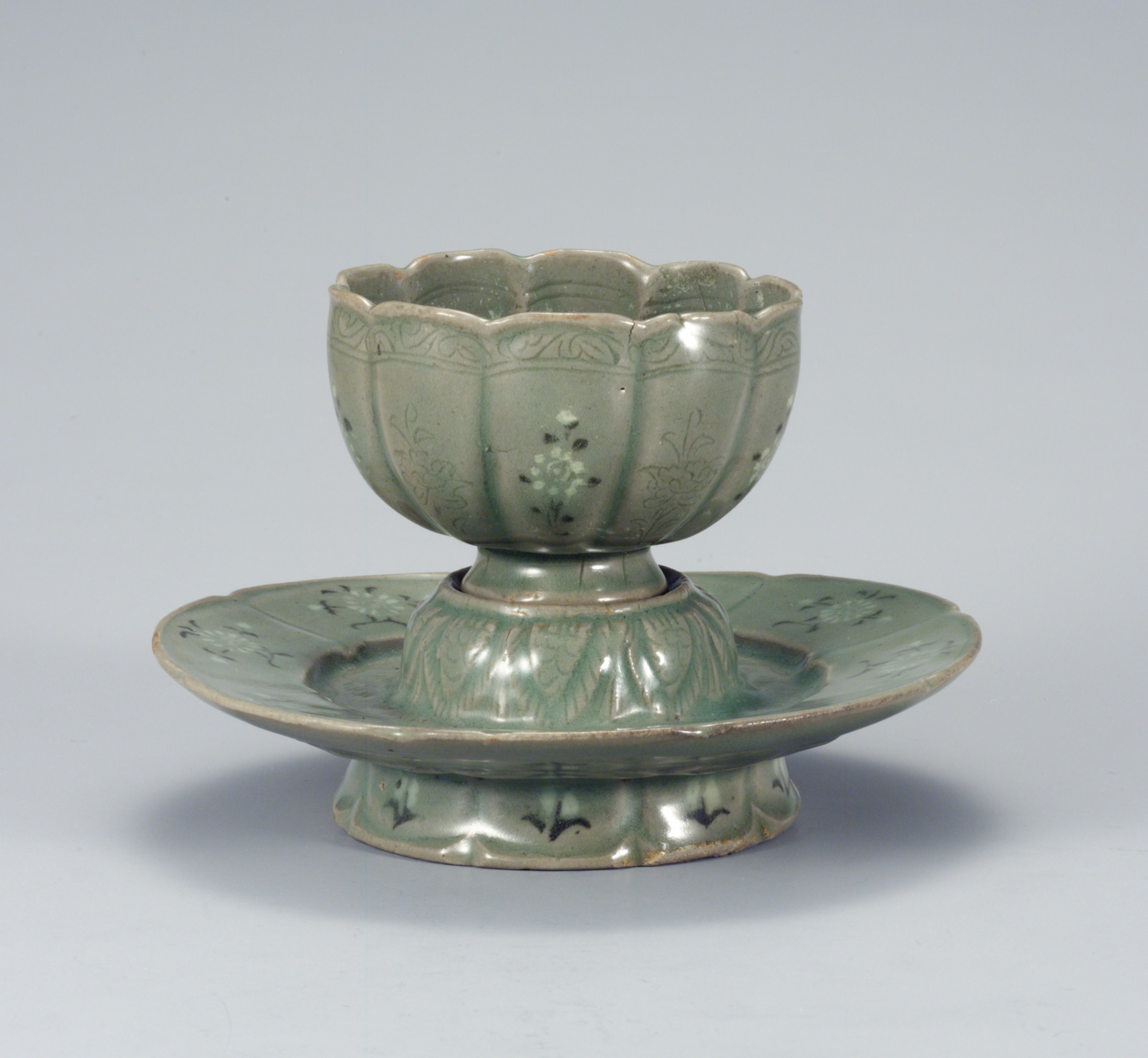
Tea cup with flower inlays, Goryeo dynasty

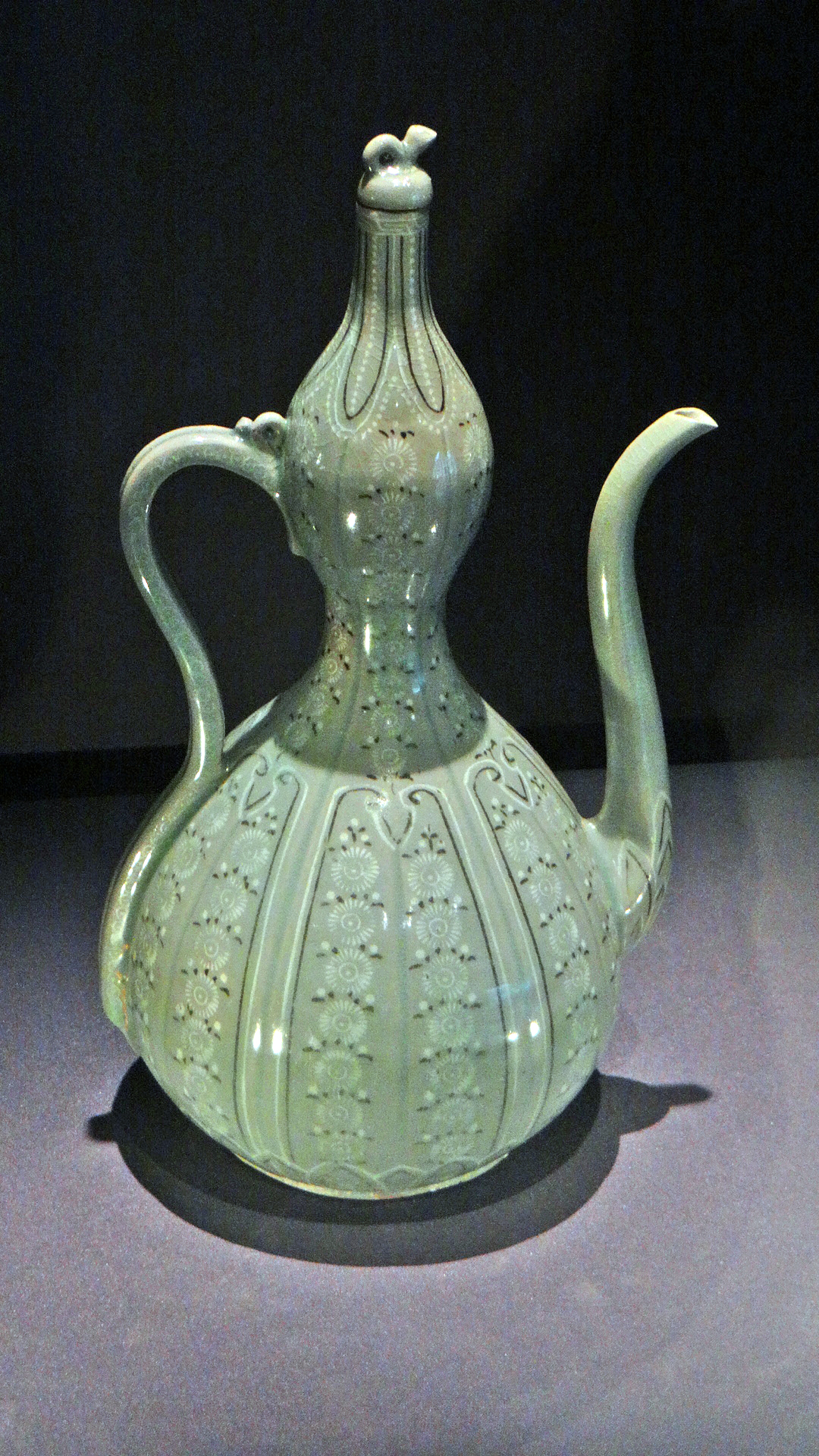
Horibyeong, Korea celadon of Goryeo period

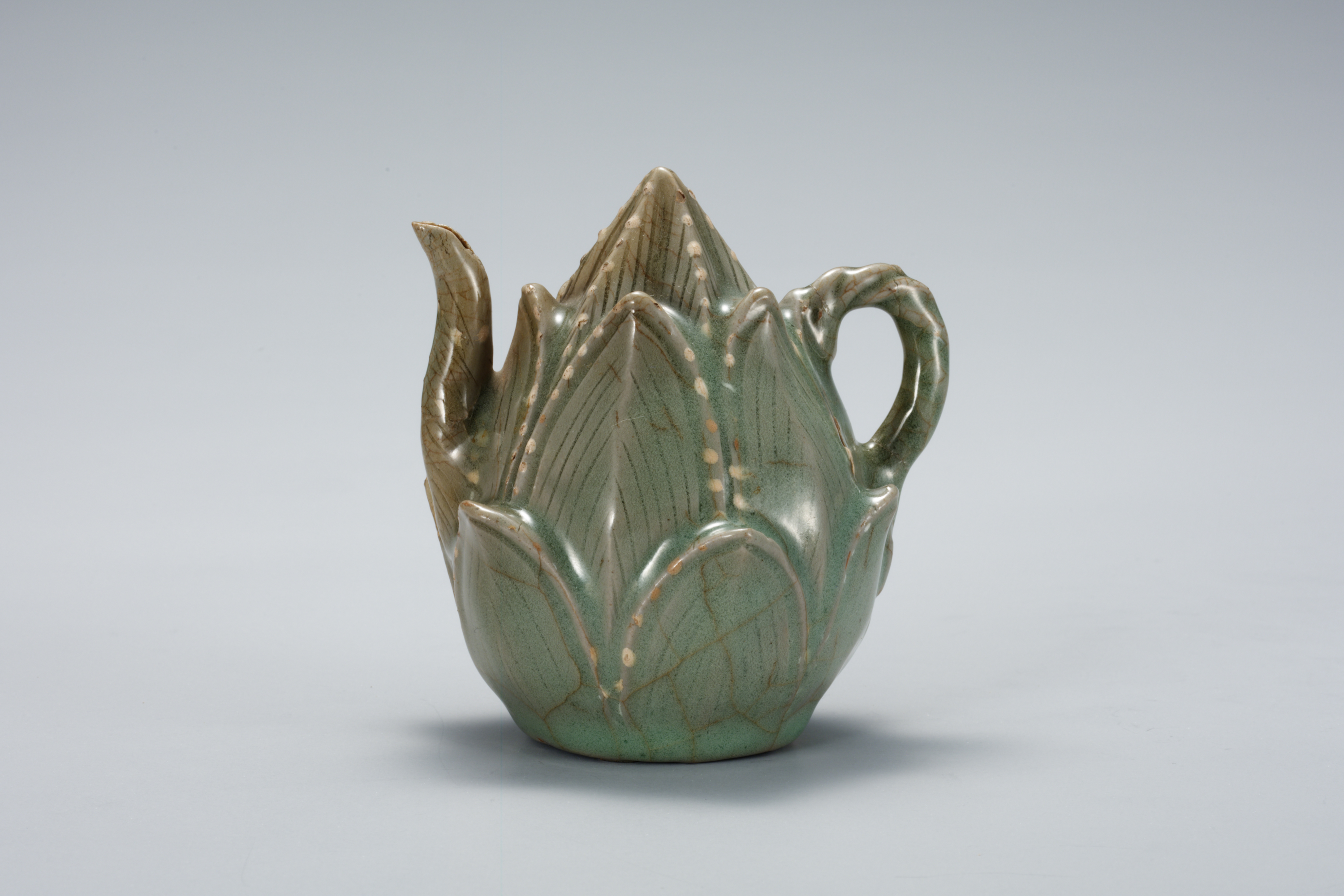
Creative design of baby bamboo, virtue for scholars, water dropper for calligraphy, Seoye

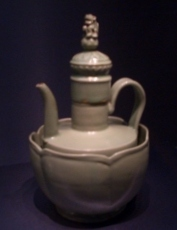
Goryeo celadon ewer or tea pot inside a cup

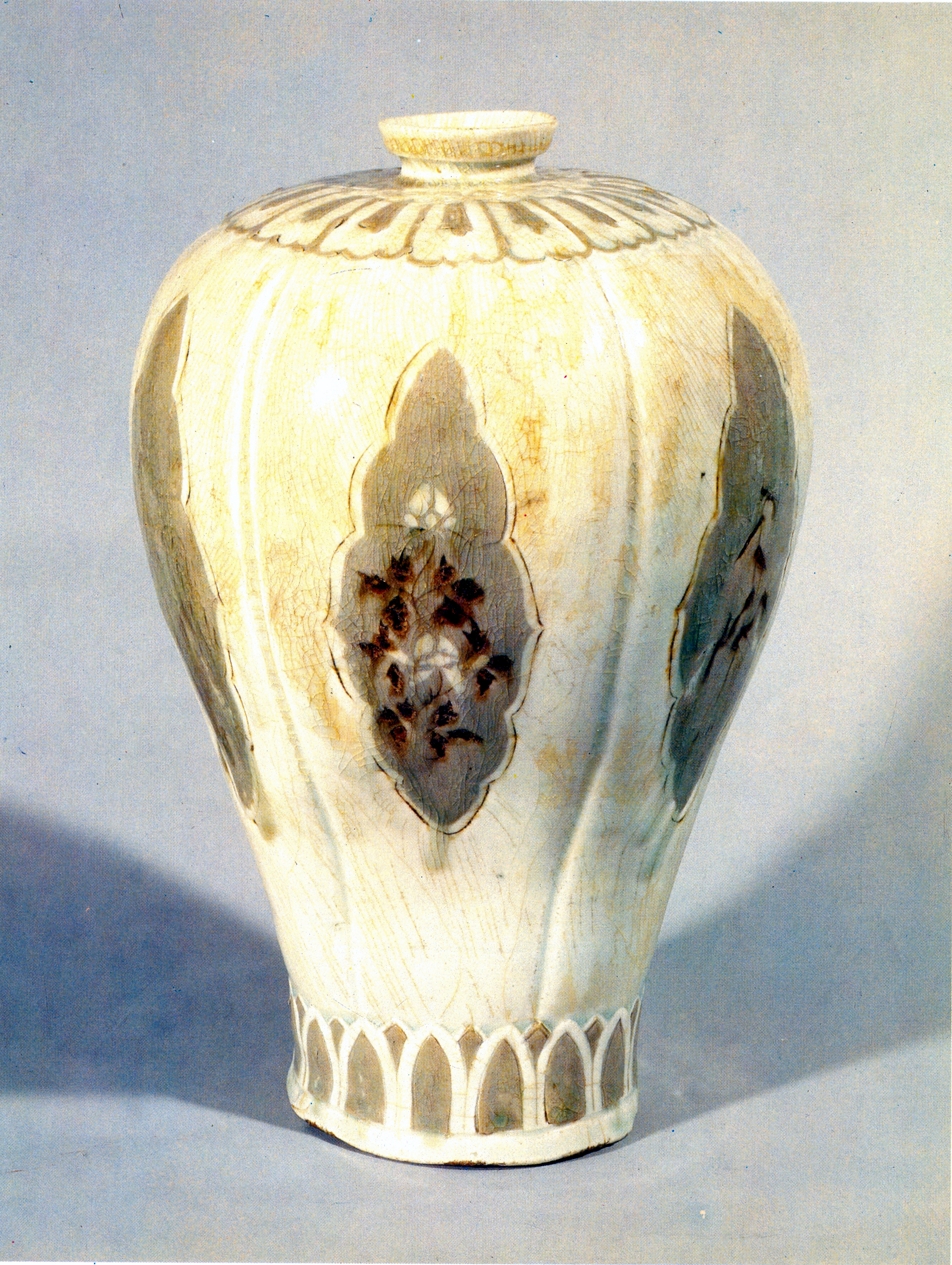
A step to the white porcelain, Goryeo celadon

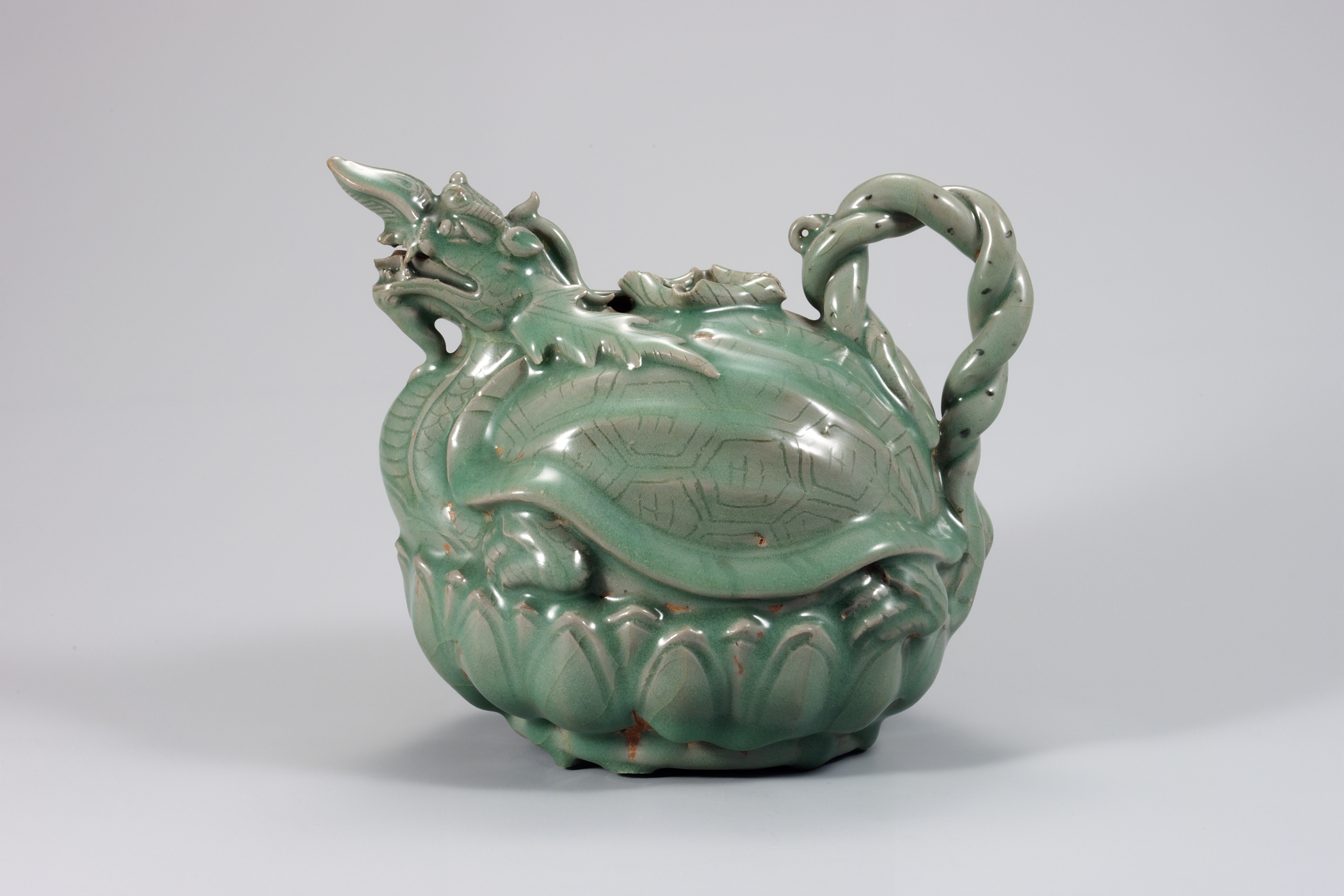
Pitcher in the shape of a Dragon Turtle, Goryeo dynasty (National Treasure No. 96)

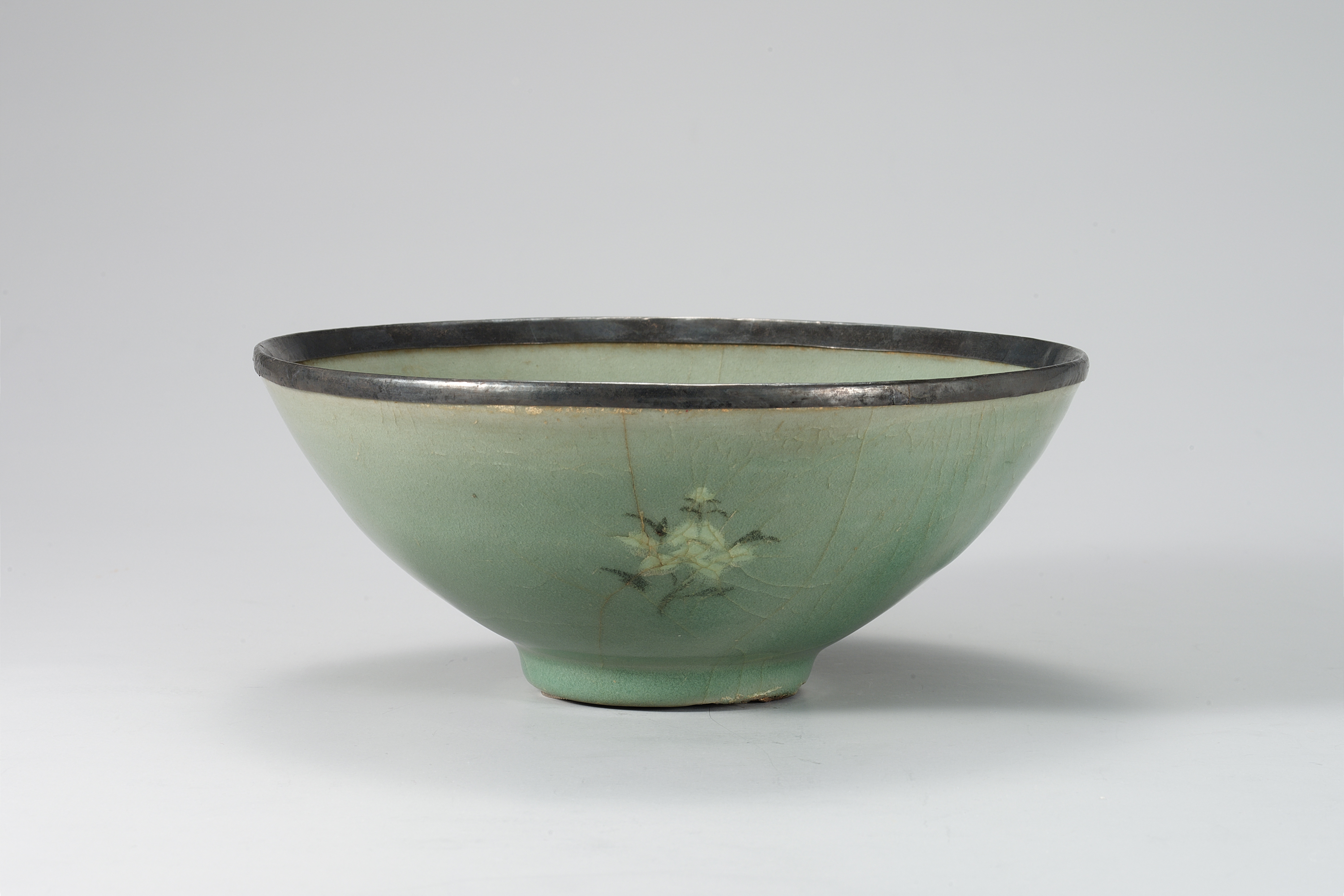
Inlay carved tea cup with silver lining, Goryeo celadon

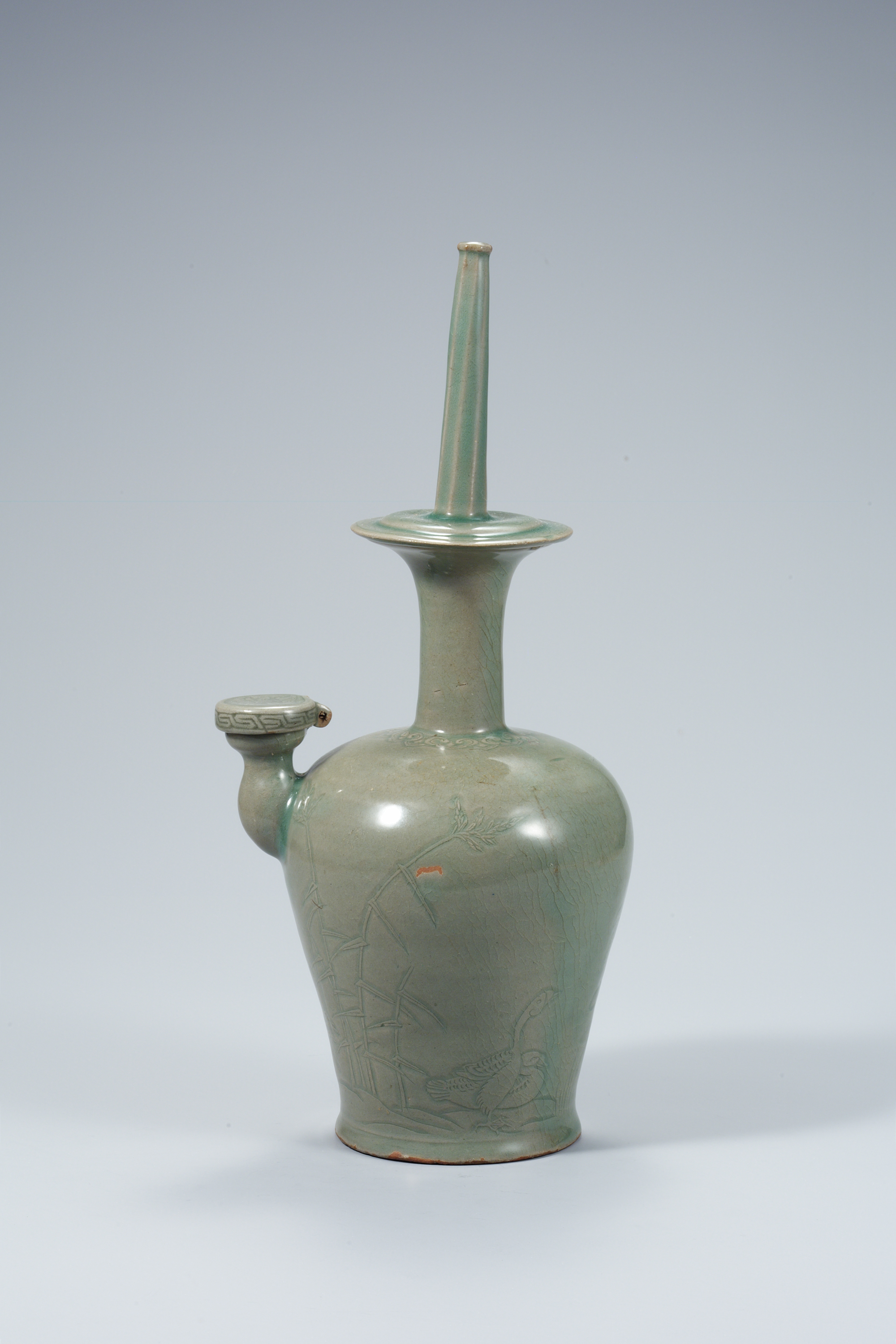
Celadon Buddhist ritual sprinkler with phragmites and wild goose design in relief

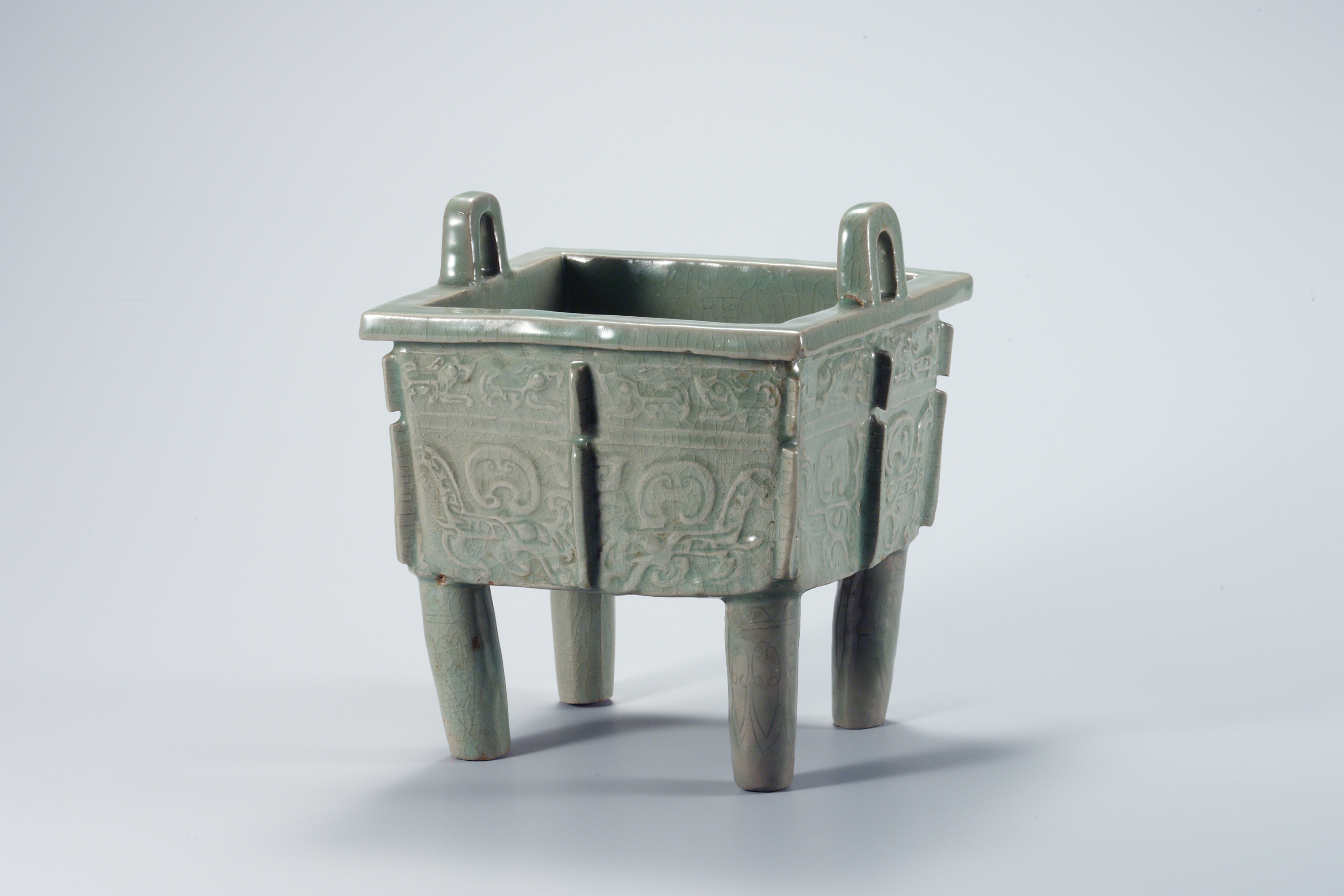
Incense burner, Goryeo Celadon

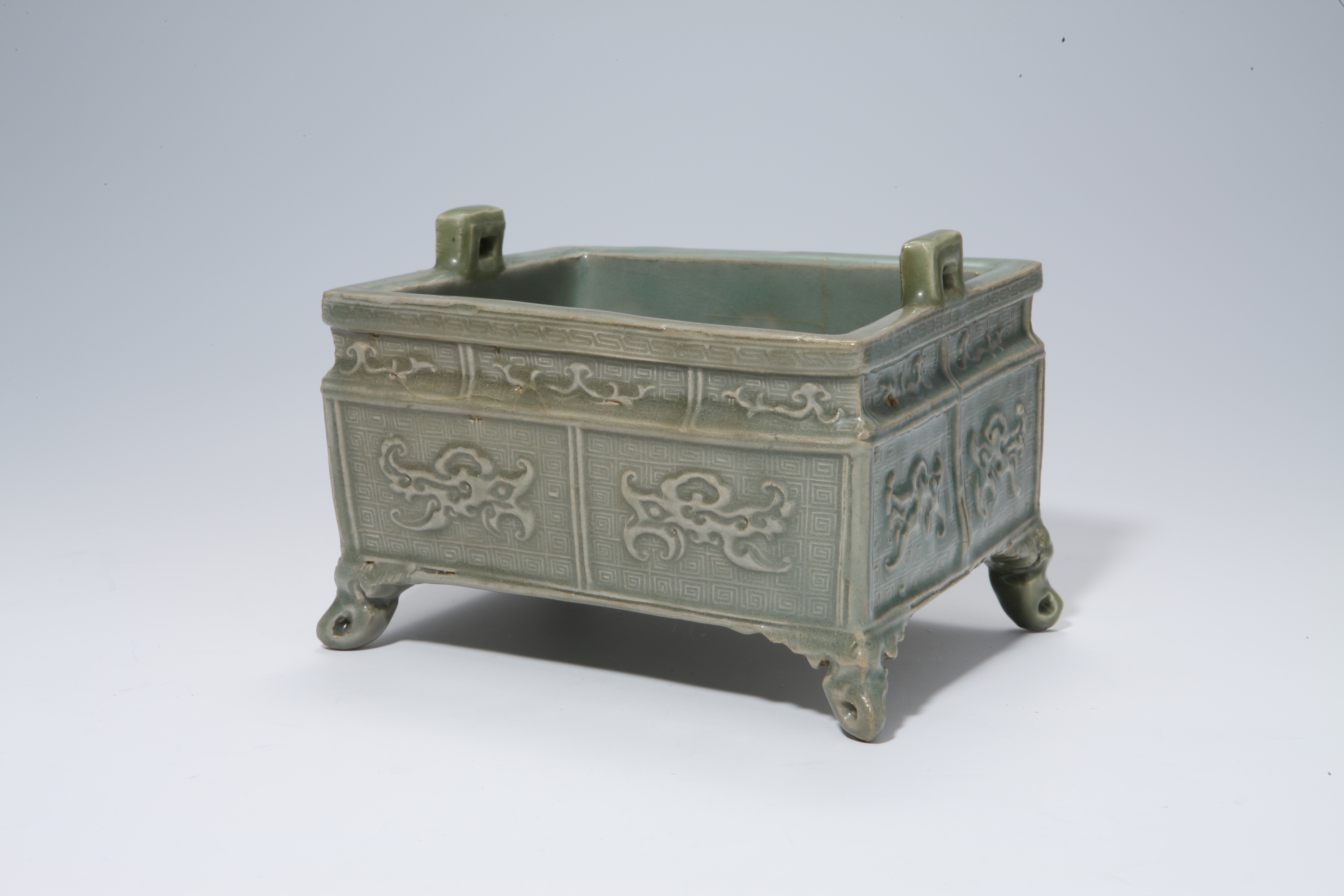
Incense burner of Goryeo, celadon

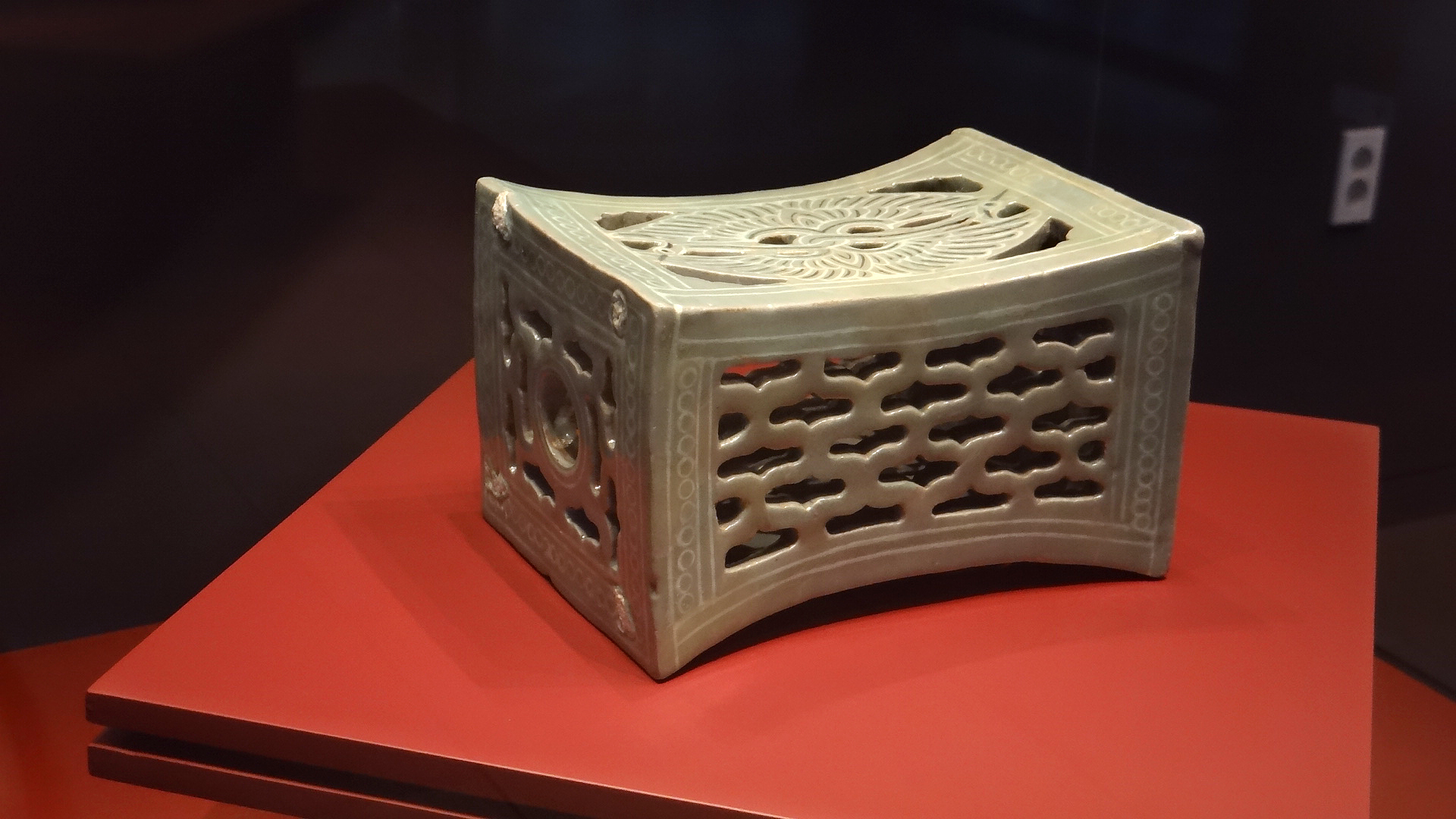
Pillow, celadon example of Goryeo period single-wall openwork

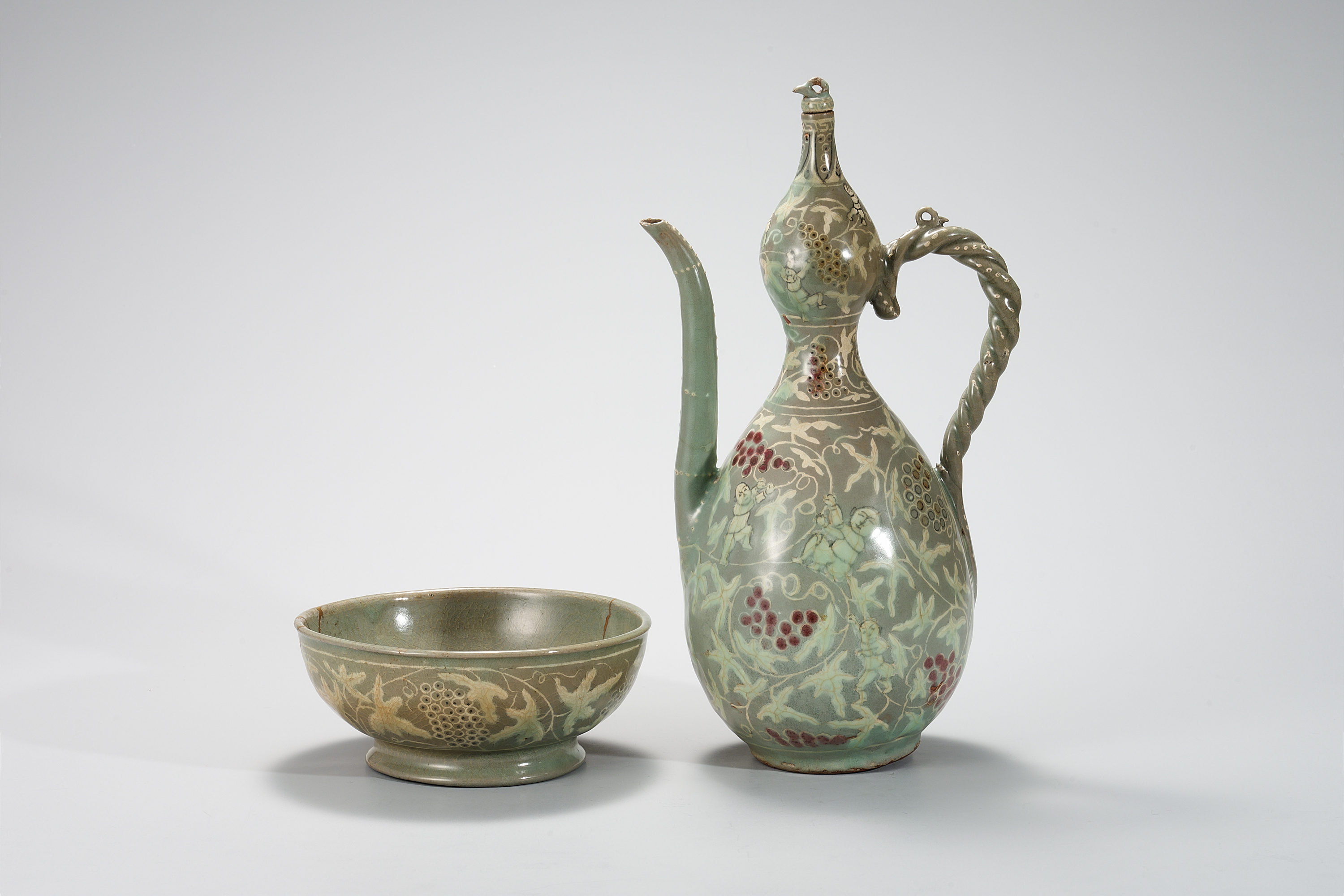
Celadon hand-carved inlaid and colored red, decorated with grapes

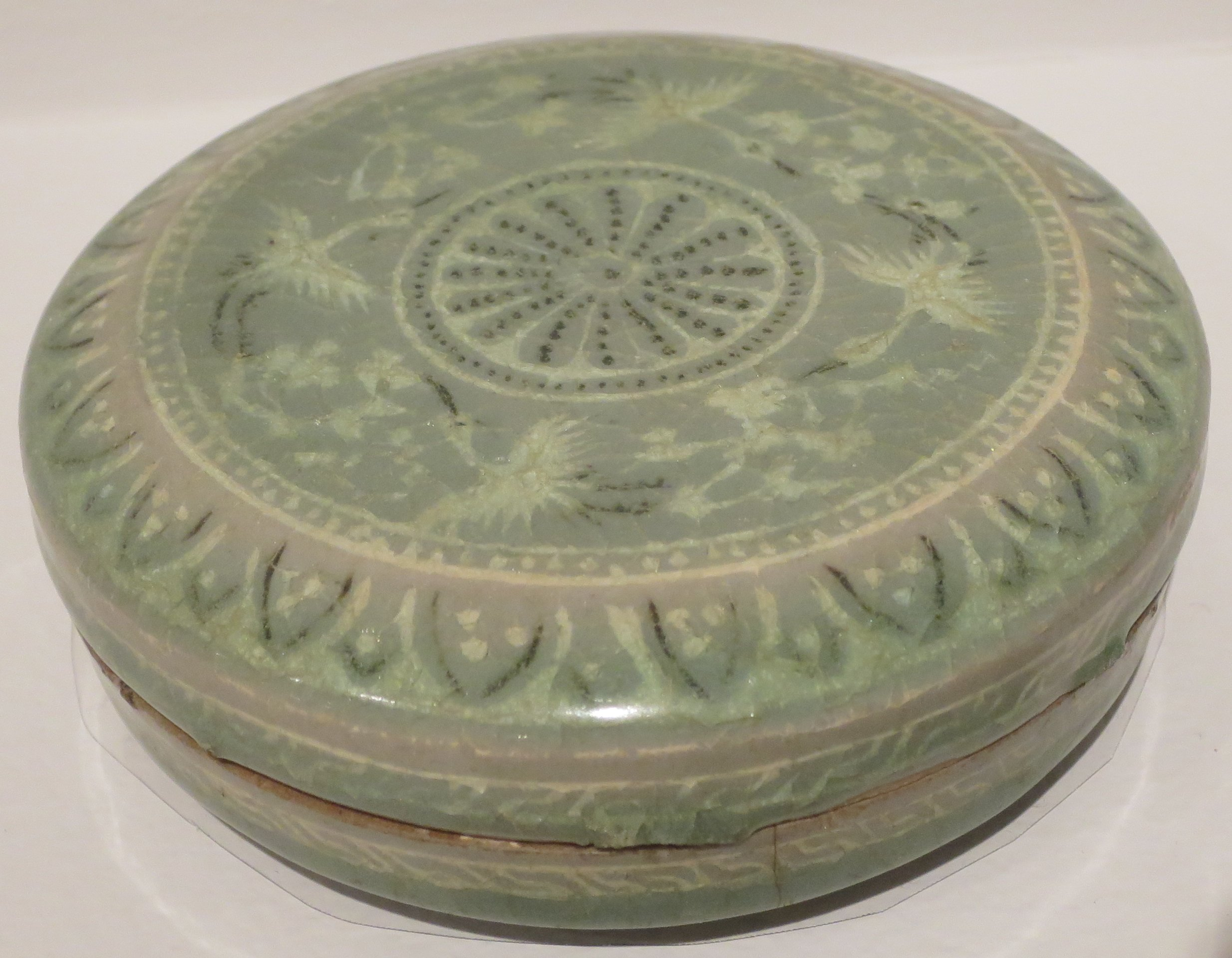
Goryeo incense keeping case hand carved and inlaid with white and black, white cranes decorated

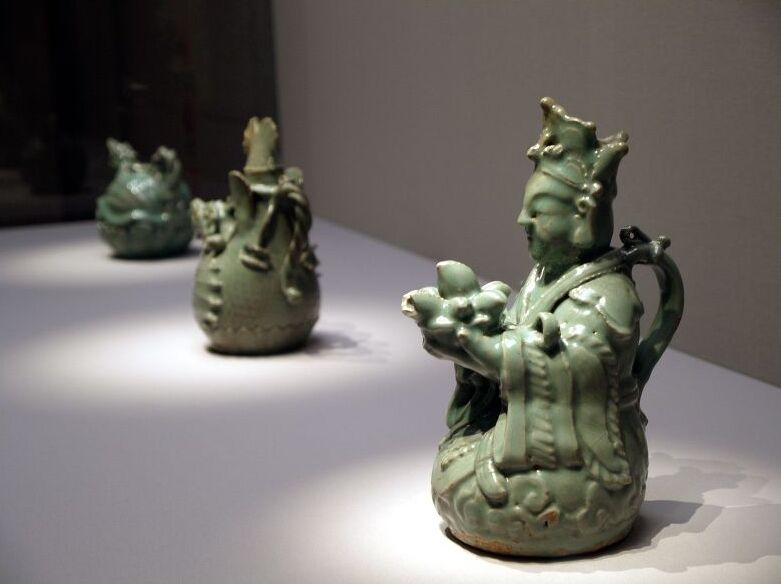
Korea Goryeo dynasty object of a seated immortal

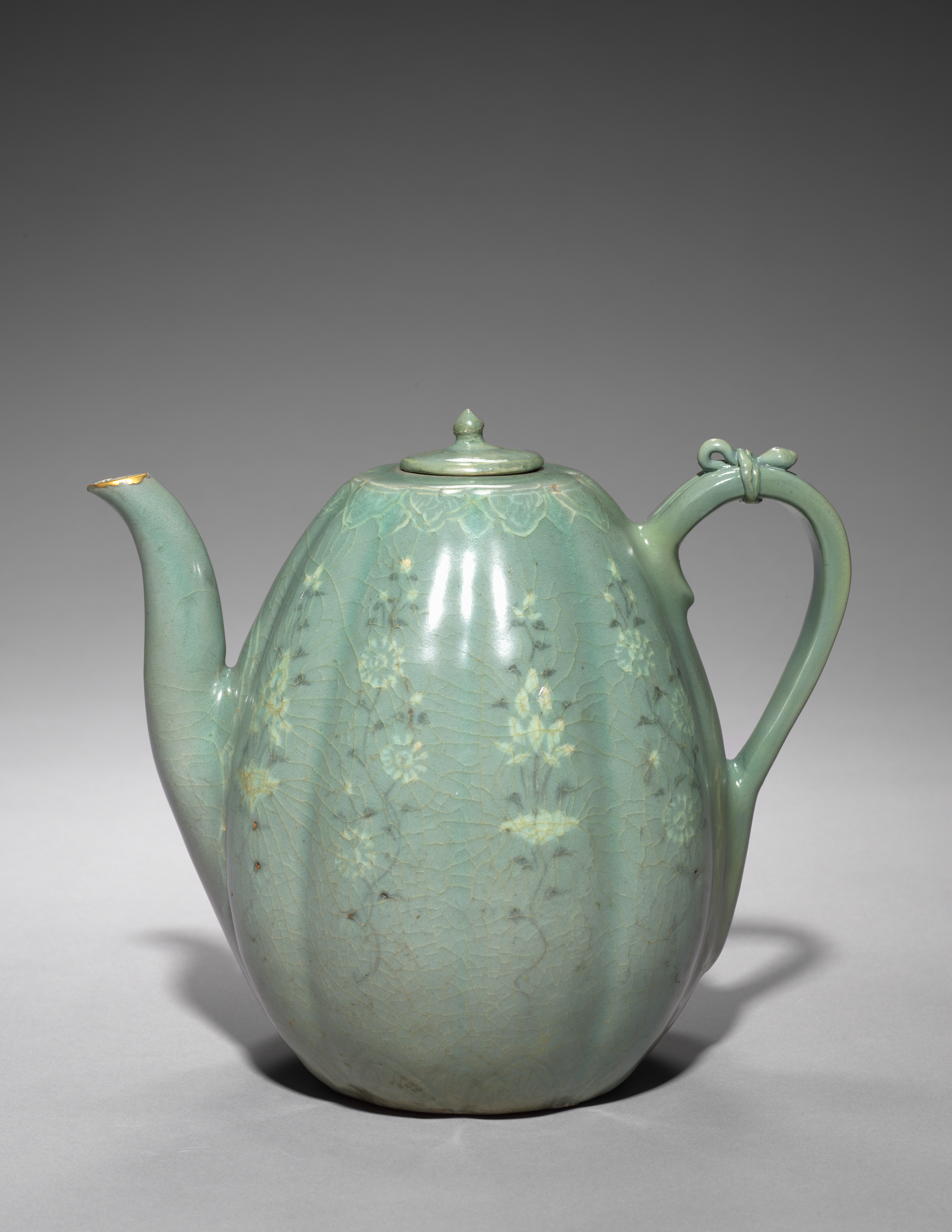
Korean water melon Chamowe shape tea pot or ewer became popular

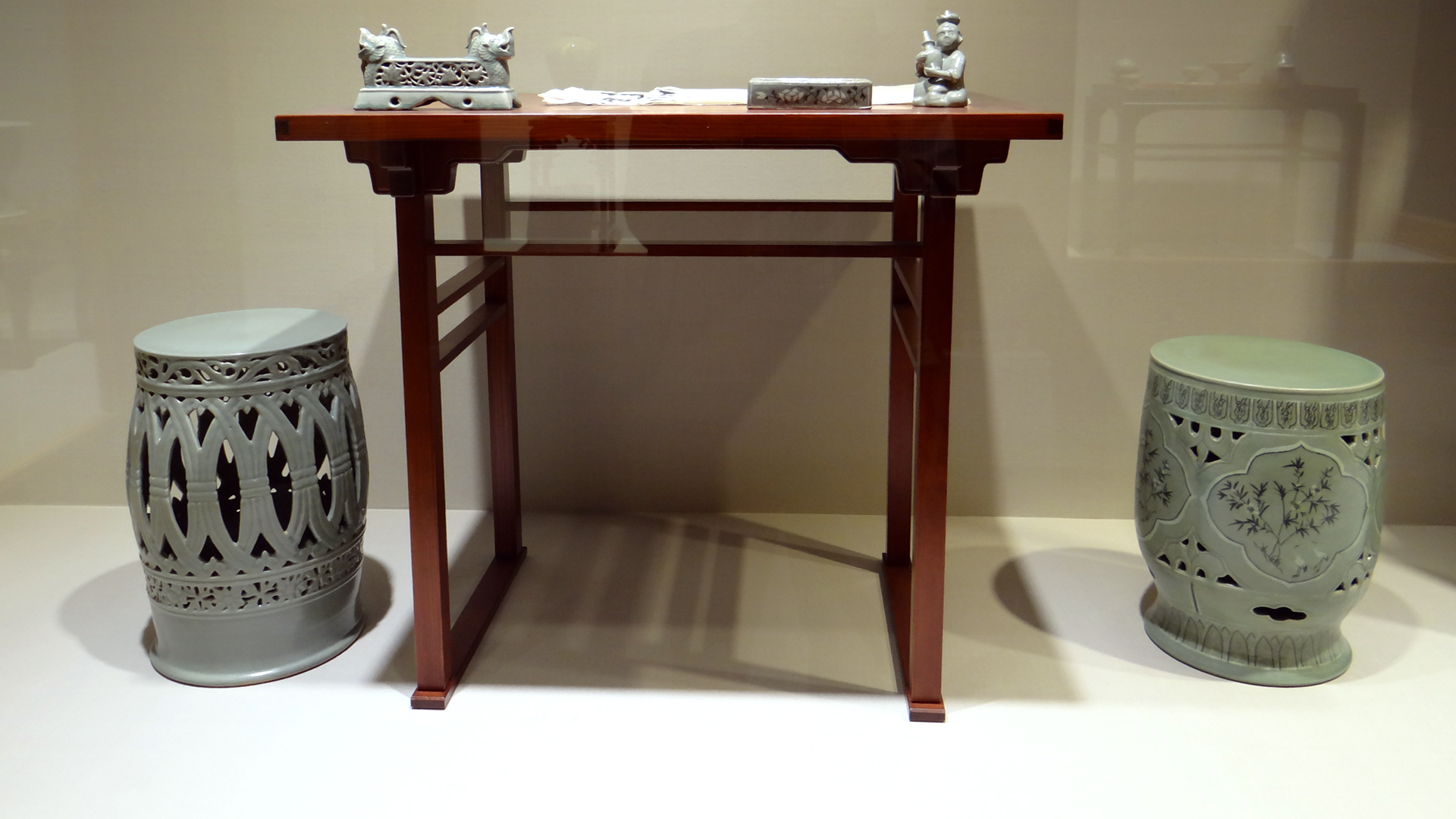
Celadon openwork chairs, objects for calligraphy ceremony Seoye

Lighter glazed tea cup Goryeo celadon, incised parrot

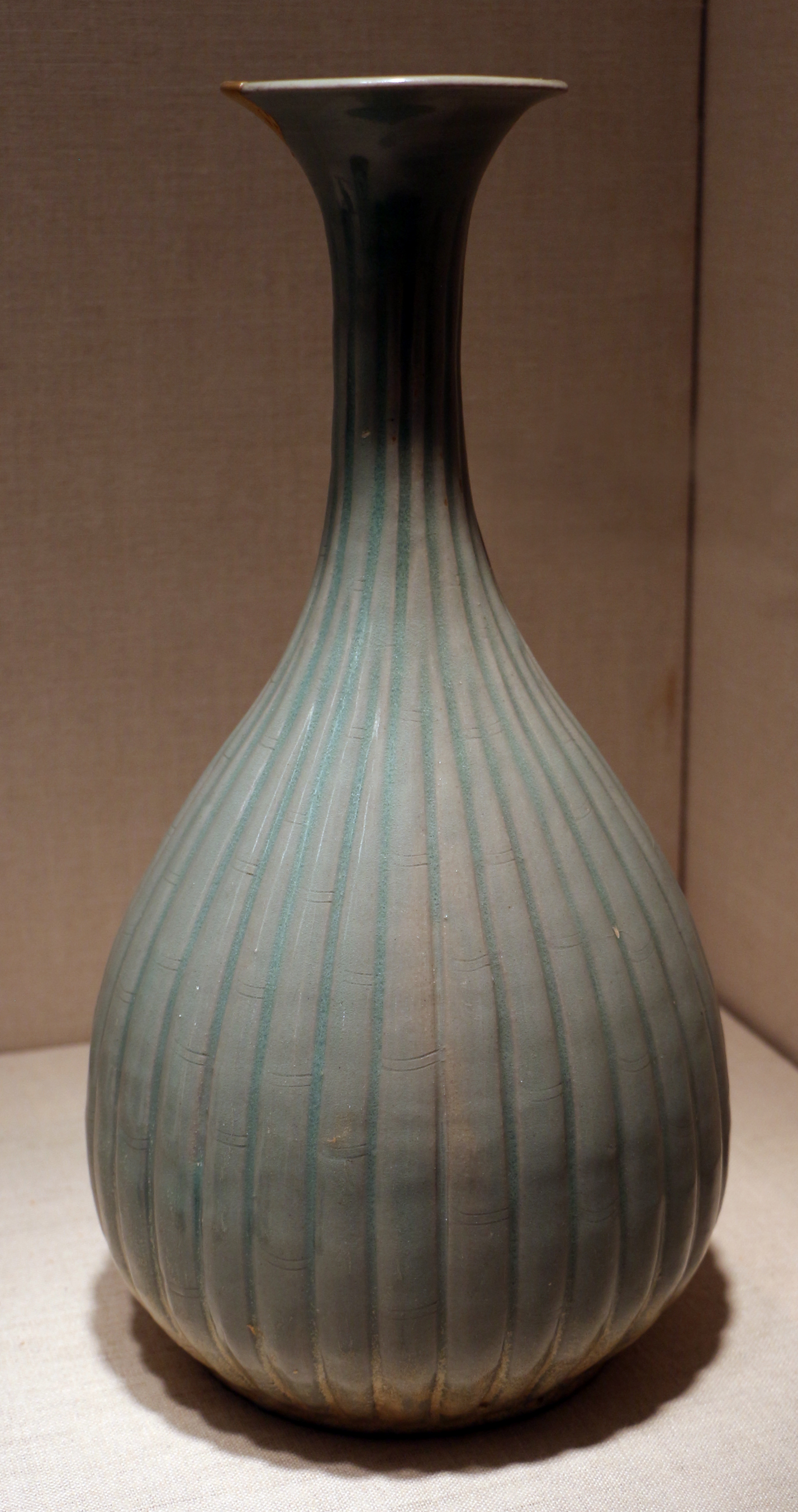

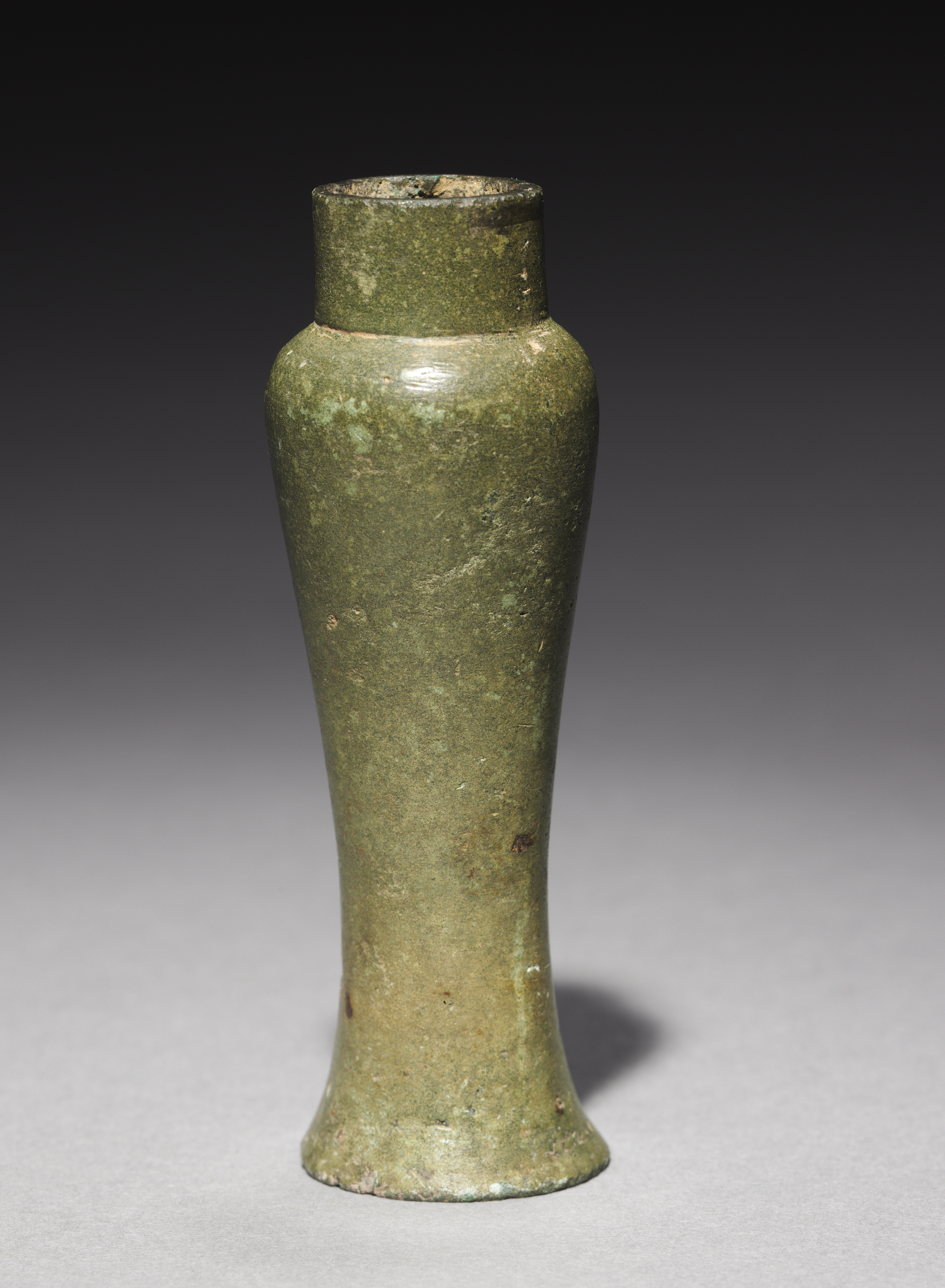
Celadon vase, Goryeo period

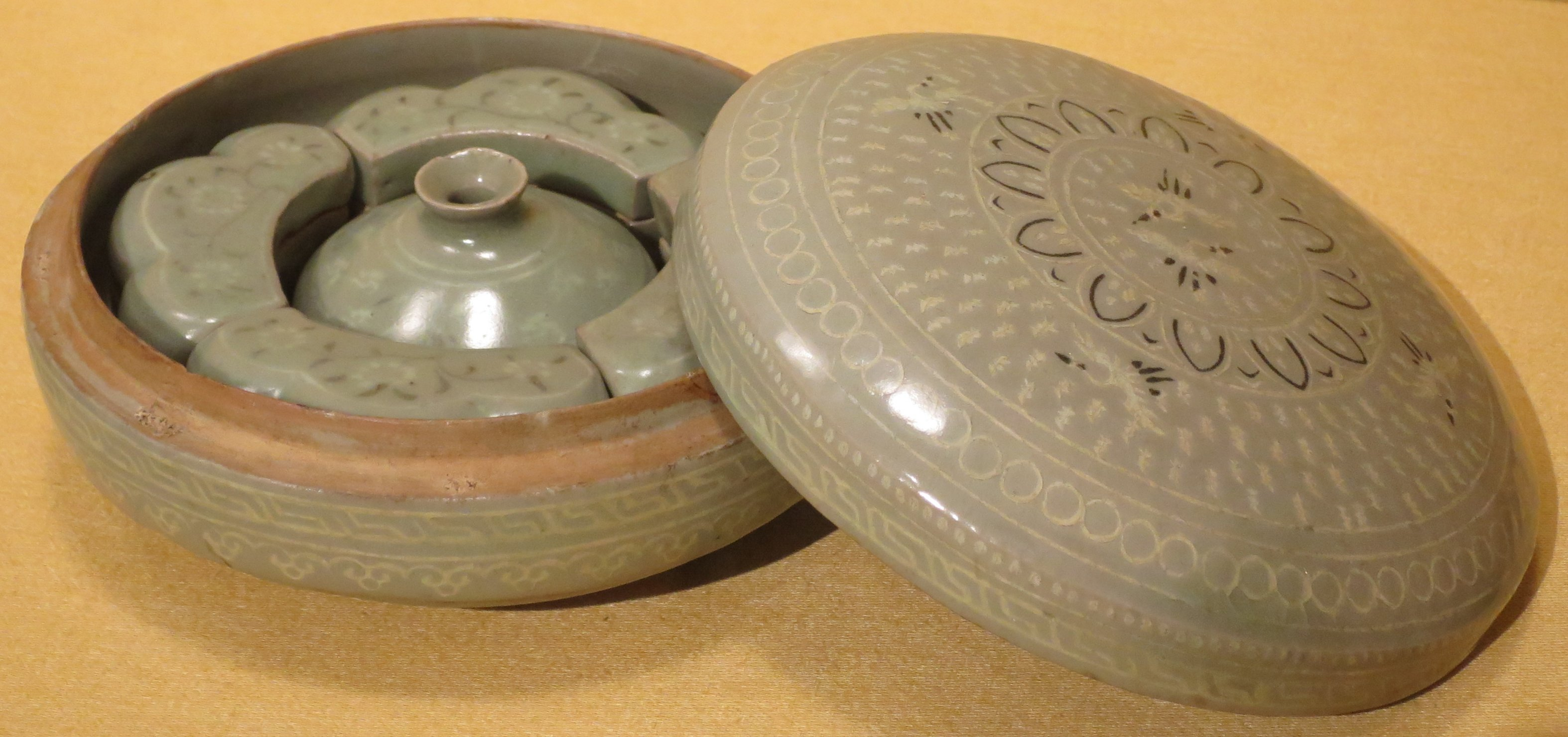
Aromatic oil container with four other incense boxed

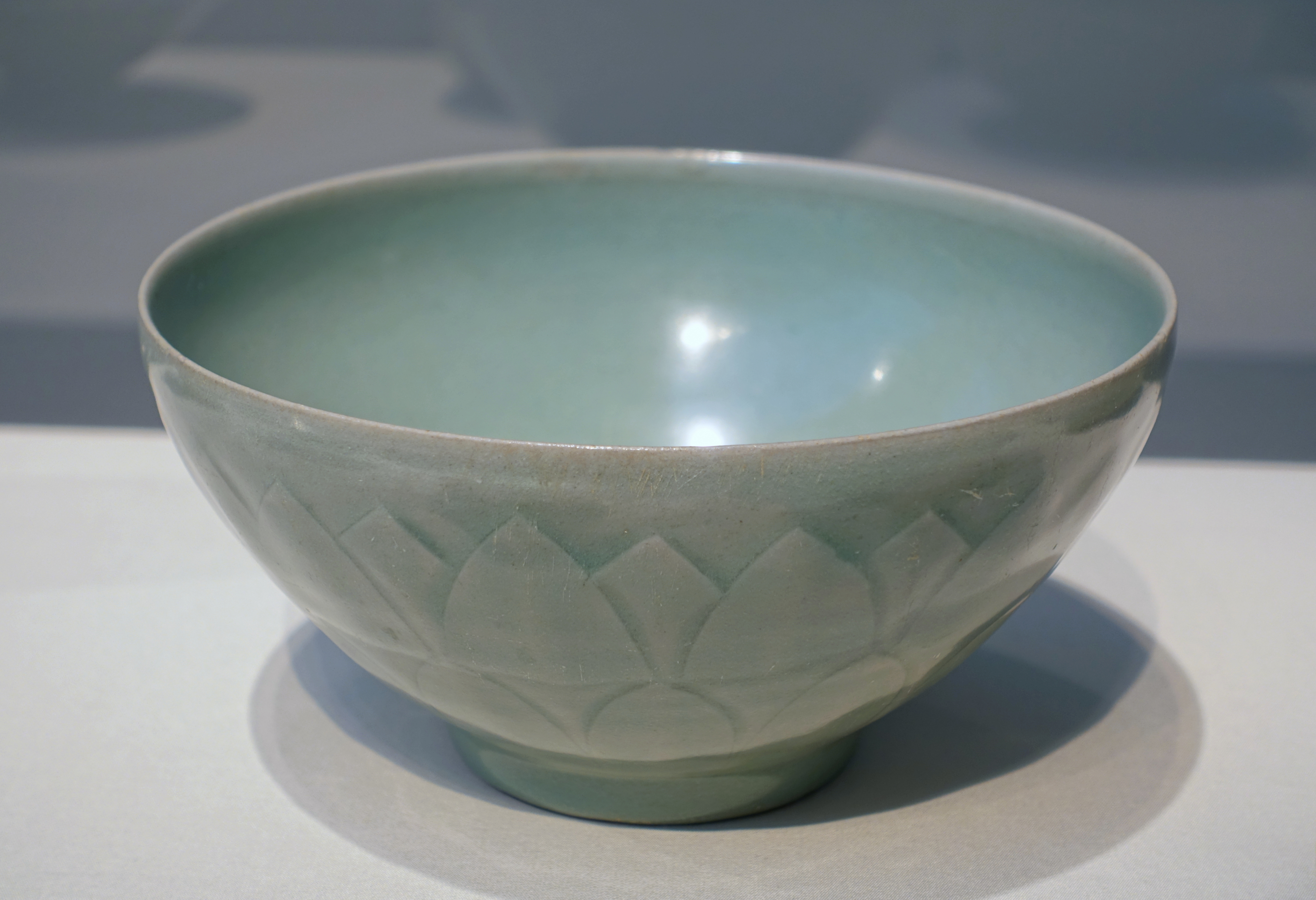
Molded and carved lotus, Gangjin kilns, 1100–1250 celadon

Face washing plate called sesoodaeya, Goryeo celadon

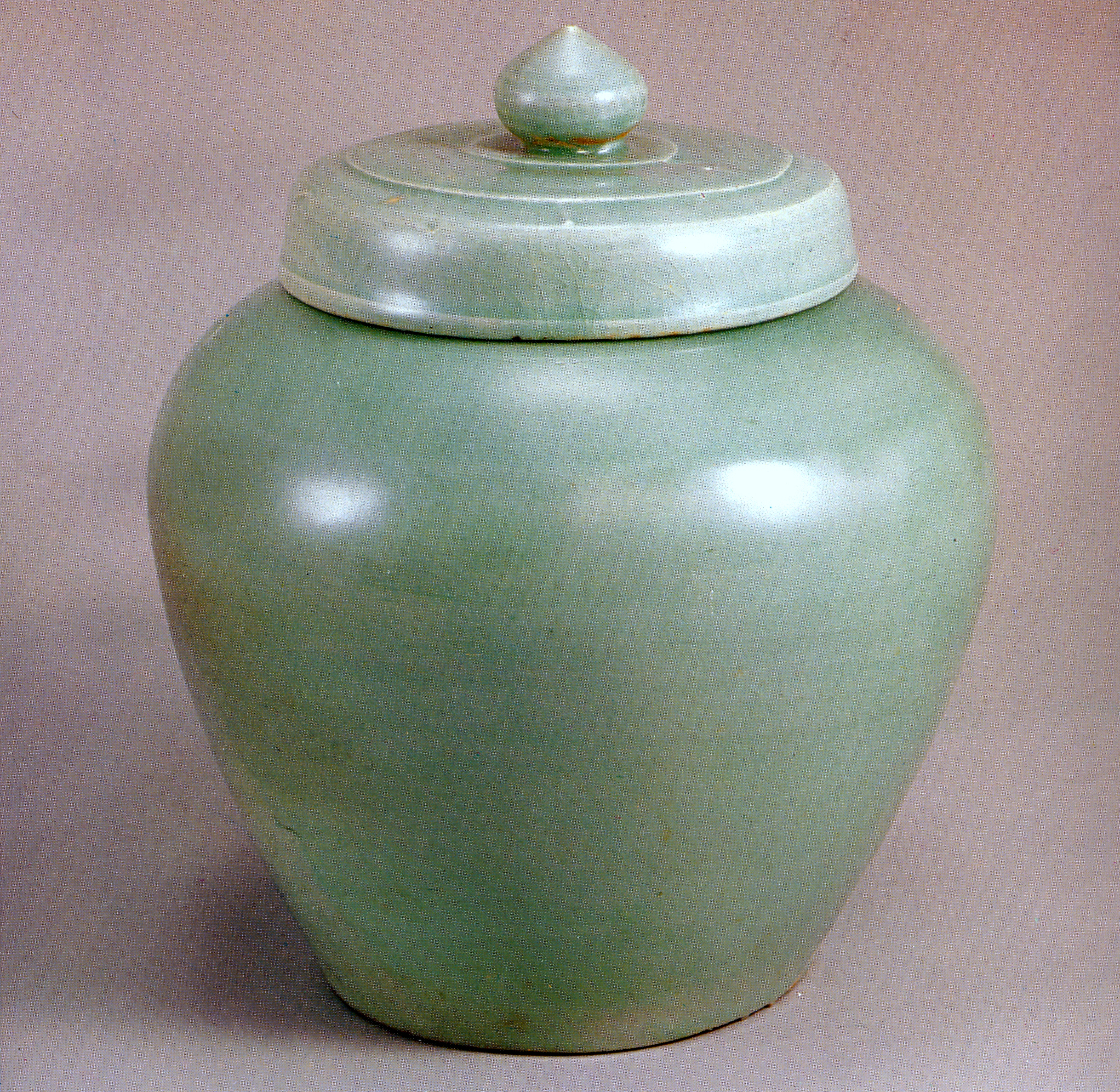
Lidded Jar, Joseon dynasty (National Treasure No. 1071)

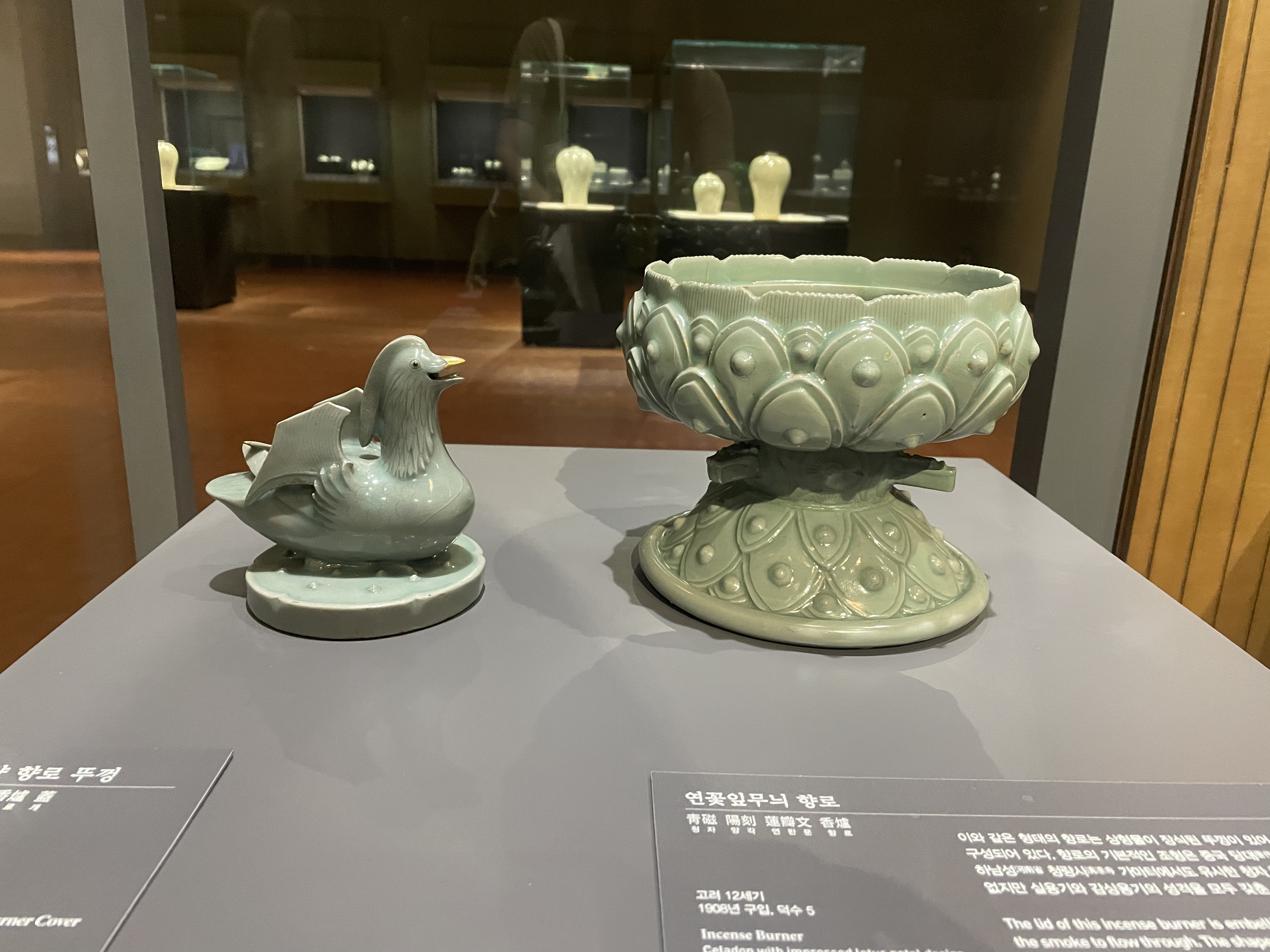
Goryeo celadon incense burner with duck lid on, 12th century, duck symbolizes a sacred guide to the sky on the way across a hwangcheon river after death

== Southeast Asia ==
=== Thai celadon ===
Thai ceramics has its own tradition of greenware production. Medieval Thai wares were initially influenced by Chinese greenware, but went on to develop its own unique style and technique. One of the most famous kilns during the Sukhothai Kingdom were at S(r)i Satchanalai, around Si Satchanalai District and Sawankhalok District, Sukhothai Province, north-central Thailand. Production started in the 13th century CE and continued until the 16th century. The art reached its apex in the 14th century.

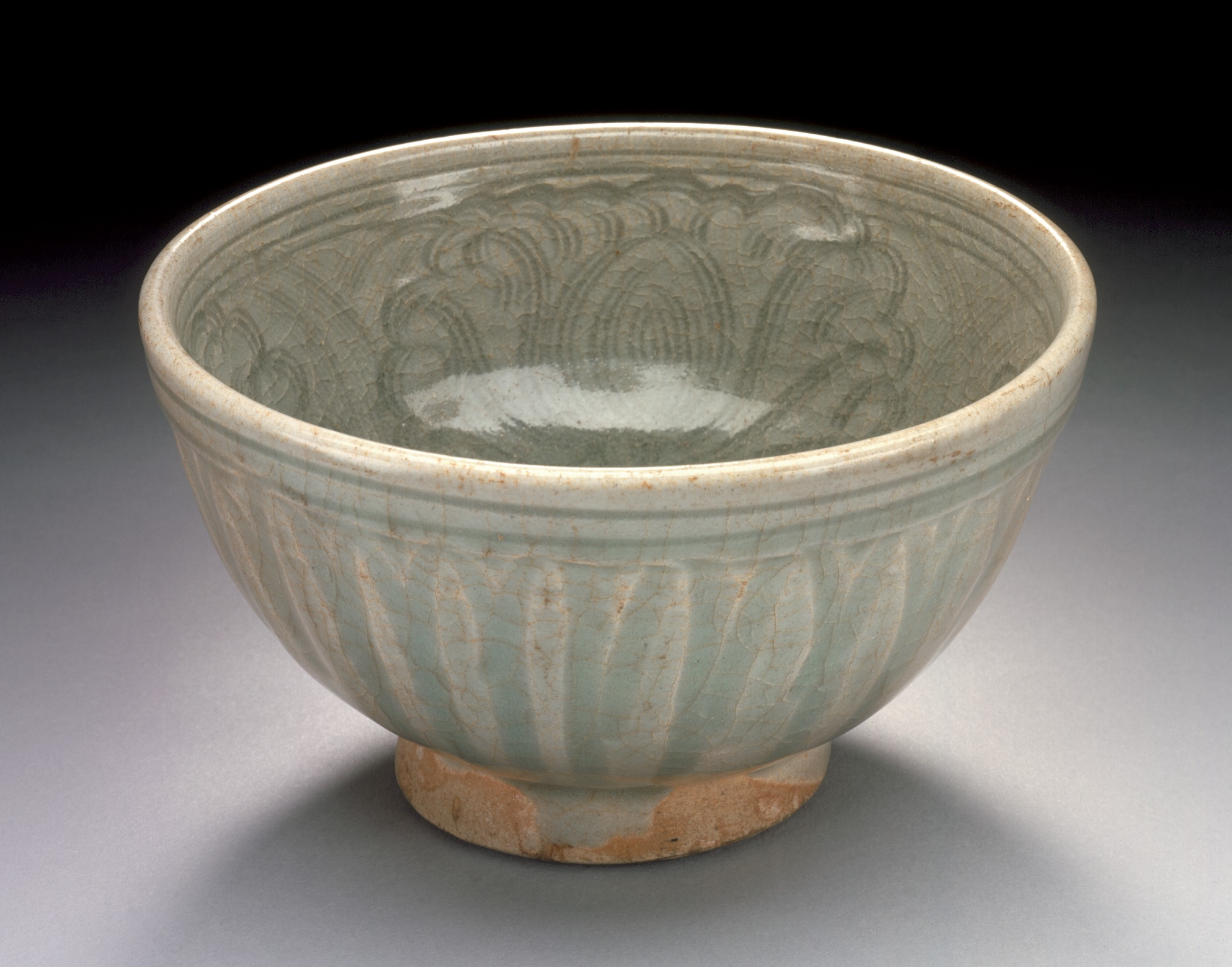
Bowl with incised peony designs, Sri Satchanalai, 15th century

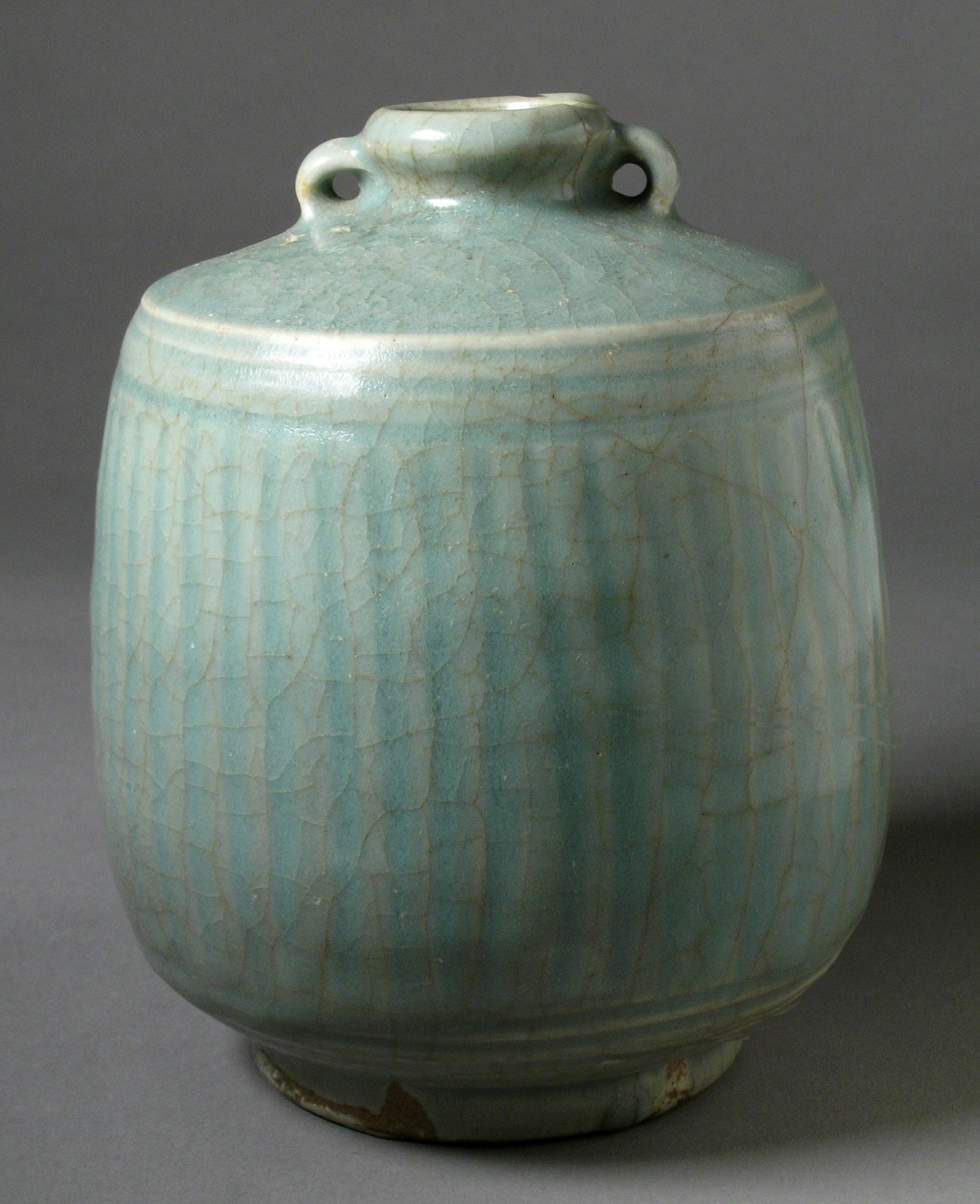
Bottle with two shoulder lugs, Sawankhalok, 15th century

=== Vietnamese celadon ===
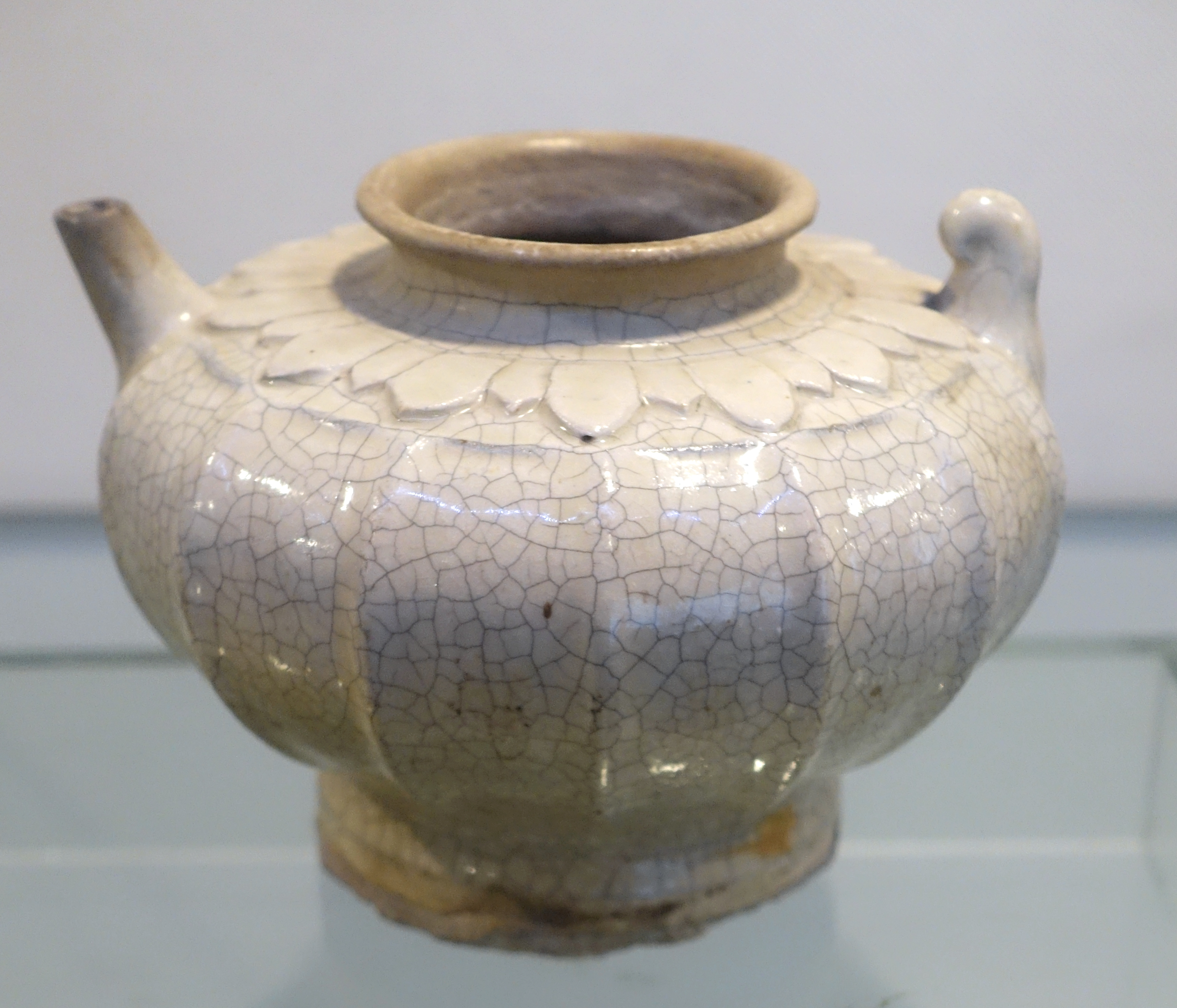
Teapot, Lý dynasty period, 11th–12th century

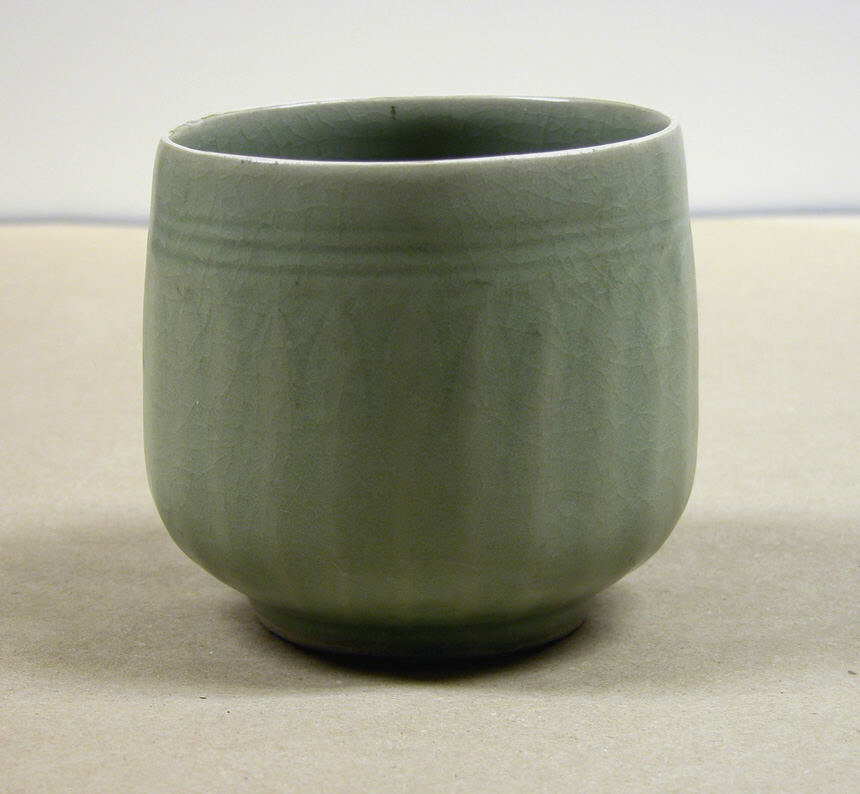
Tea cup, Lý dynasty period, 11th–12th century

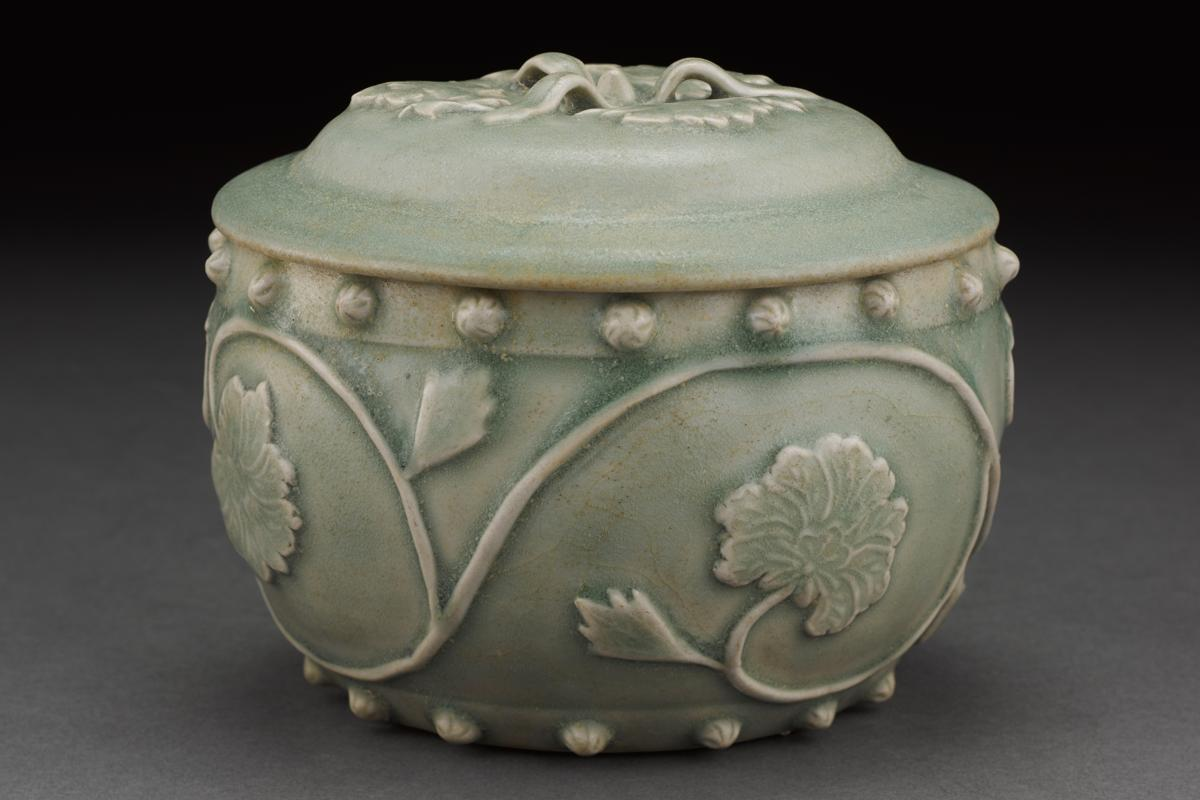
Green celadon jar, Trần dynasty period, 14th century

== Others ==
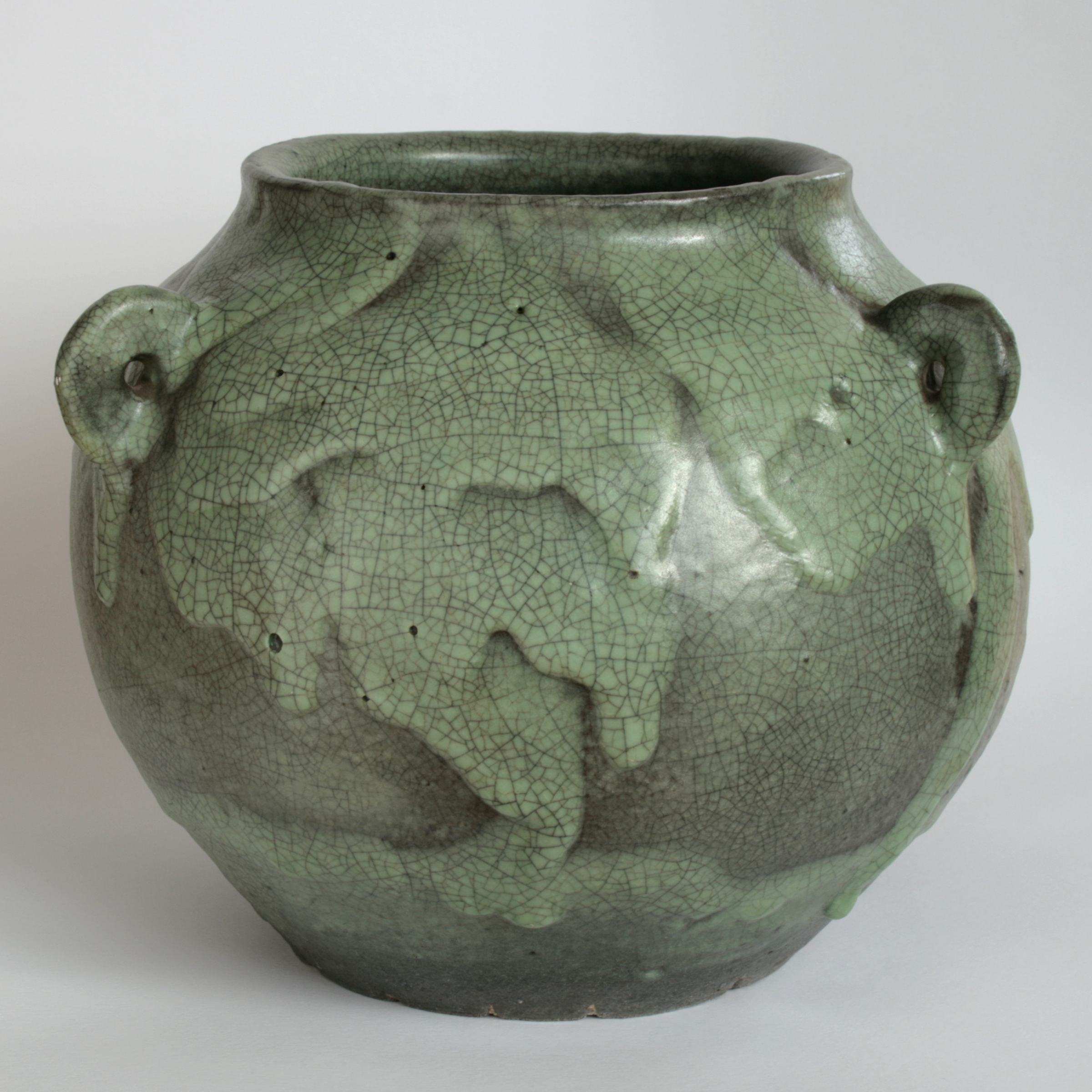
Ceramic ware covered with celadon glaze, by Wanda Golakowska, Poland, 2nd half of 20th century

Outside of East Asia, a number of artists also worked with greenware to varying degrees of success in regard to purity and quality. These include Thomas Bezanson of Weston Priory in the US and Wanda Golakowska (1901–1975) of Poland, whose works are part of the collection of the National Museum, Warsaw and National Museum, Kraków.

== Bibliography ==
- Gompertz, G. St. G. M., Chinese Celadon Wares, 1980 (2nd ed.), Faber & Faber, ISBN 0571180035.
