= Haft-rang =

Type of Iranian tilework

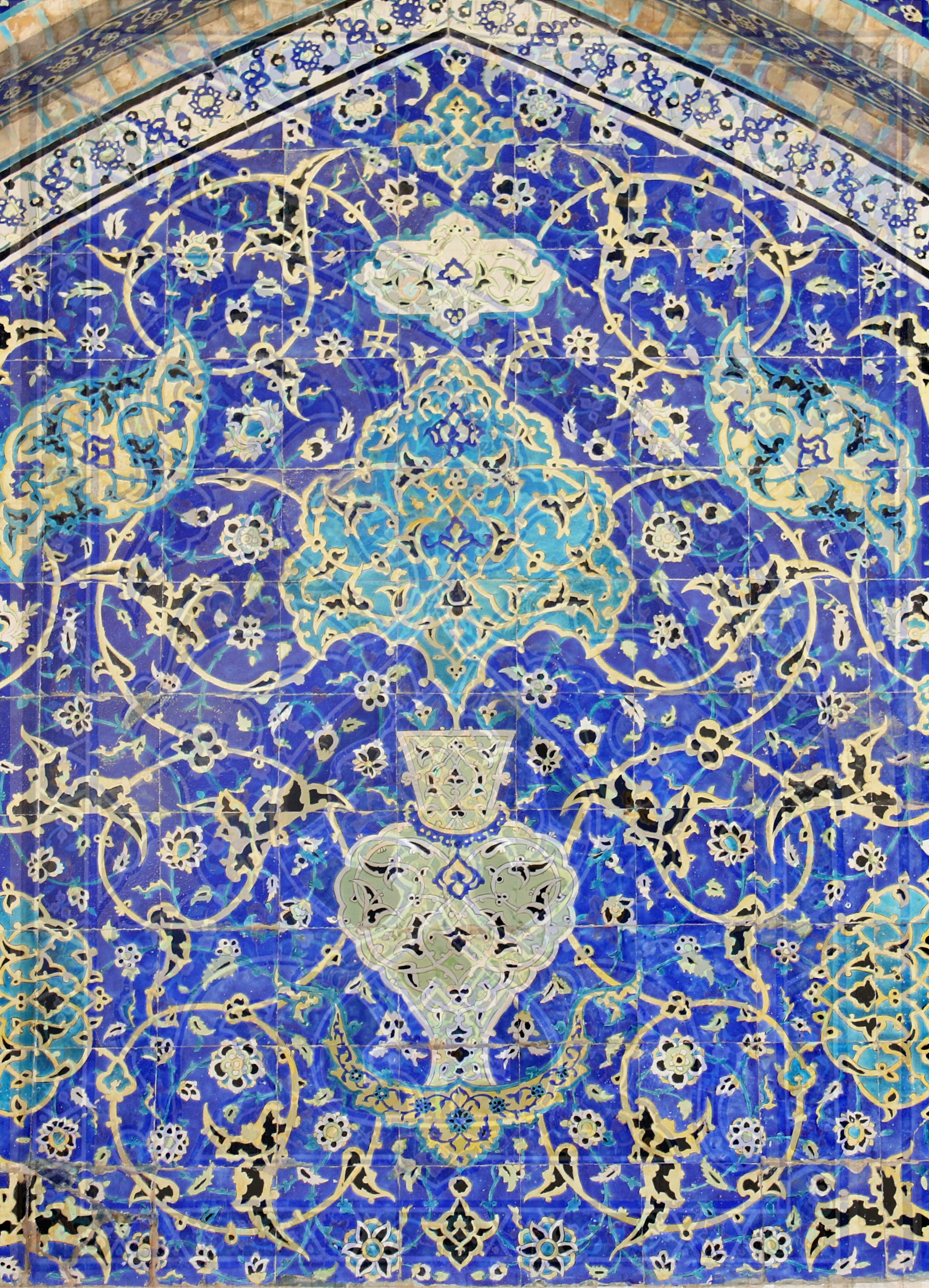
Haft-rang tilework, composed of a number of decorated square tiles. Shah Mosque (Isfahan), 1611–1629

Haft-rang (Persian: هفت رنگ, lit. 'seven colours') is a Persian term for a decorative technique for underglazed ceramic tiles. This decorative technique is also sometimes described as "cloisonné", "cuerda seca" or "black line". The process begins with the application of multiple colours on square tiles coated with a white glaze. The colours are delineated with black painting so that they do not bleed into each other. Finally, the whole tile is fired in one step. This technique is decorative and relatively easy to deploy, especially compared to Mo'araq, but it does not permit an optimum firing process for each of the colours. Hence the colours are weaker, less intense, less clearly delineated, and the glazes not as strong.

== Technique ==
The Haft-rang technique for tiles only started to be used widely in the 17th century, although many examples are already known from the Timurid era, as in Gawhar Shad Madrasa (1418–1434) in Herat. Analysis of haft-rang tiles in Herat suggest the following technique: a white monochrome glaze is first applied on the tiles, followed by a variety of high-fire monochrome glazes separated by a black line made from a manganese-based mixture rich in iron, the whole combination being then encassed in a glass matrix.

Timurid Haft-rang "cloisonné" tiles can be seen in the Aq Saray Palace (1379–1396), the Bibi-Khanym Mosque (1398–1405), the Ulugh Beg Madrasa (Samarkand) and Ulugbek Madrasah (Bukhara) (1417–1420), the Ghiyathiyya Madrasa, the Zaynal-Din mausoleum (1444–1445), the Sheikh Ahmad-e Jami Mausoleum (1440–1441) or the Gawhar Shad Madrasa in Herat (1417–1438).

Haft-rang differs from Mo'araq (مُعَرَق, mosaic tiling) which is another decorative technique, using mosaic tilework, consisting in using small shards of glazed colored tile, chipped and assembled precisely together in order to form a given design. This techniques allows for long-lasting designs with vibrant colours, and is the oldest mosaic technique used in West Asia. In case of the specific use of ceramics, the term kǎši-ye mo'araq can be used.

Haft-rang also sometimes refers to pottery glazed painting techniques in general, but in this case the designation of "Mina'i" ("enamelled" ware) is more often used.

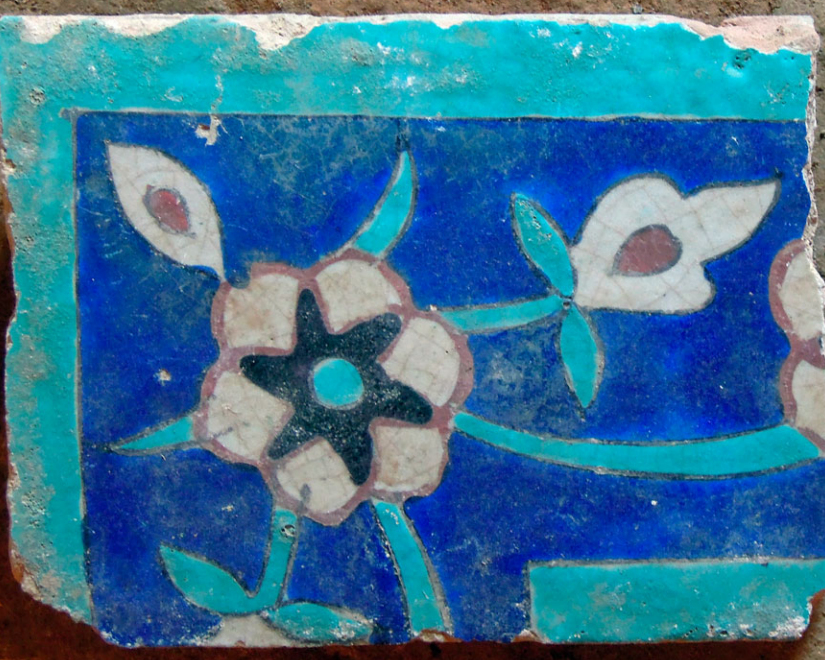
Colored-glaze “cloisonné” tile (haft-rang with black lines). Gawhar Shad Madrasa, 1418–1434.

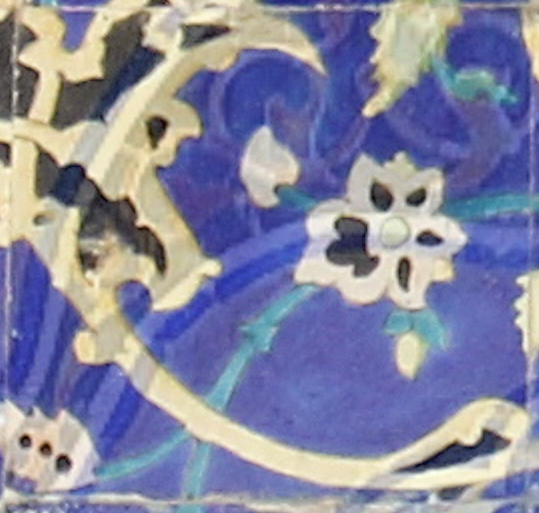
An individual haft-rang tile. Shah Mosque (Isfahan) 1611–1629

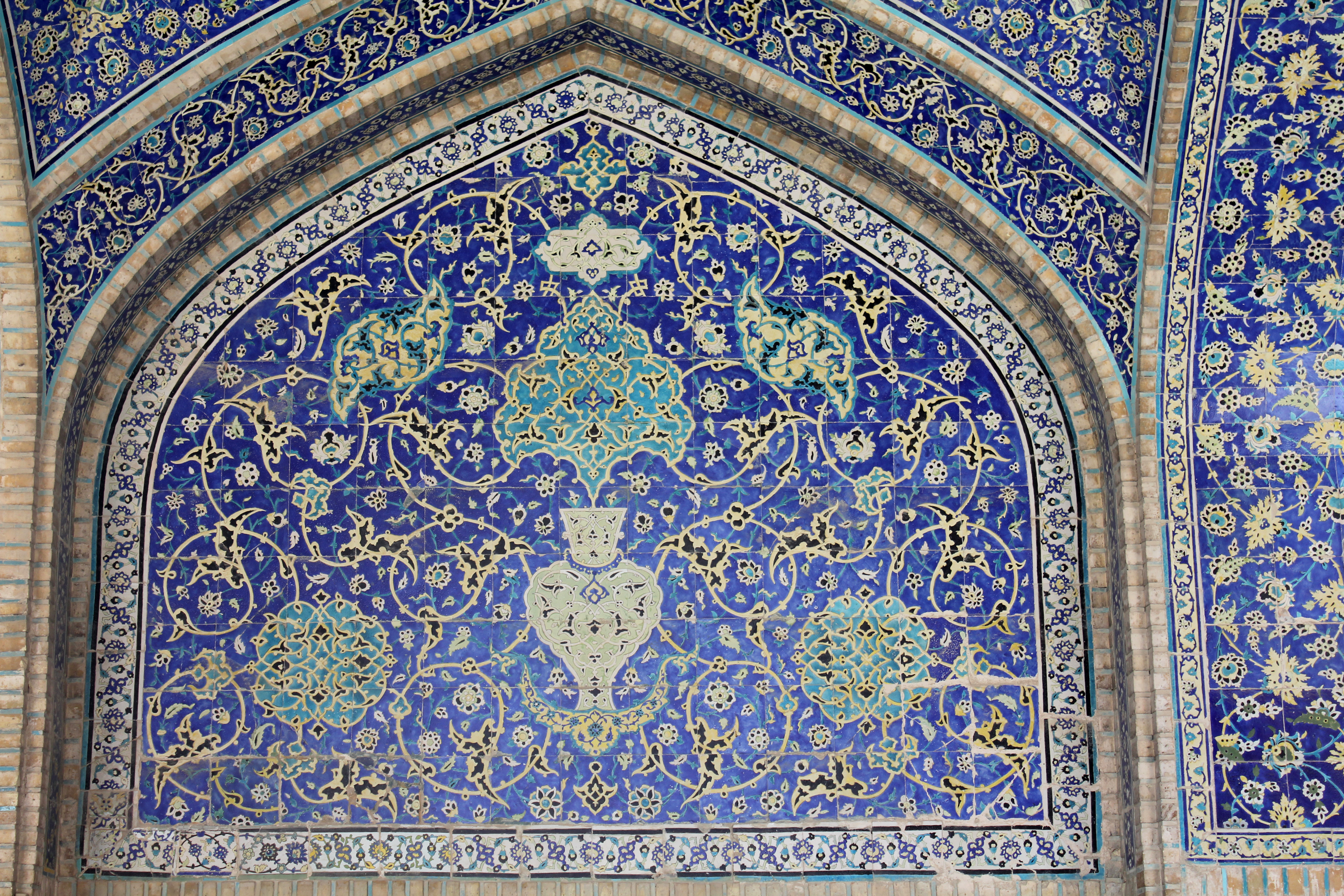
Complete haft-rang panels, made of hundreds of square tiles. Shah Mosque (Isfahan)

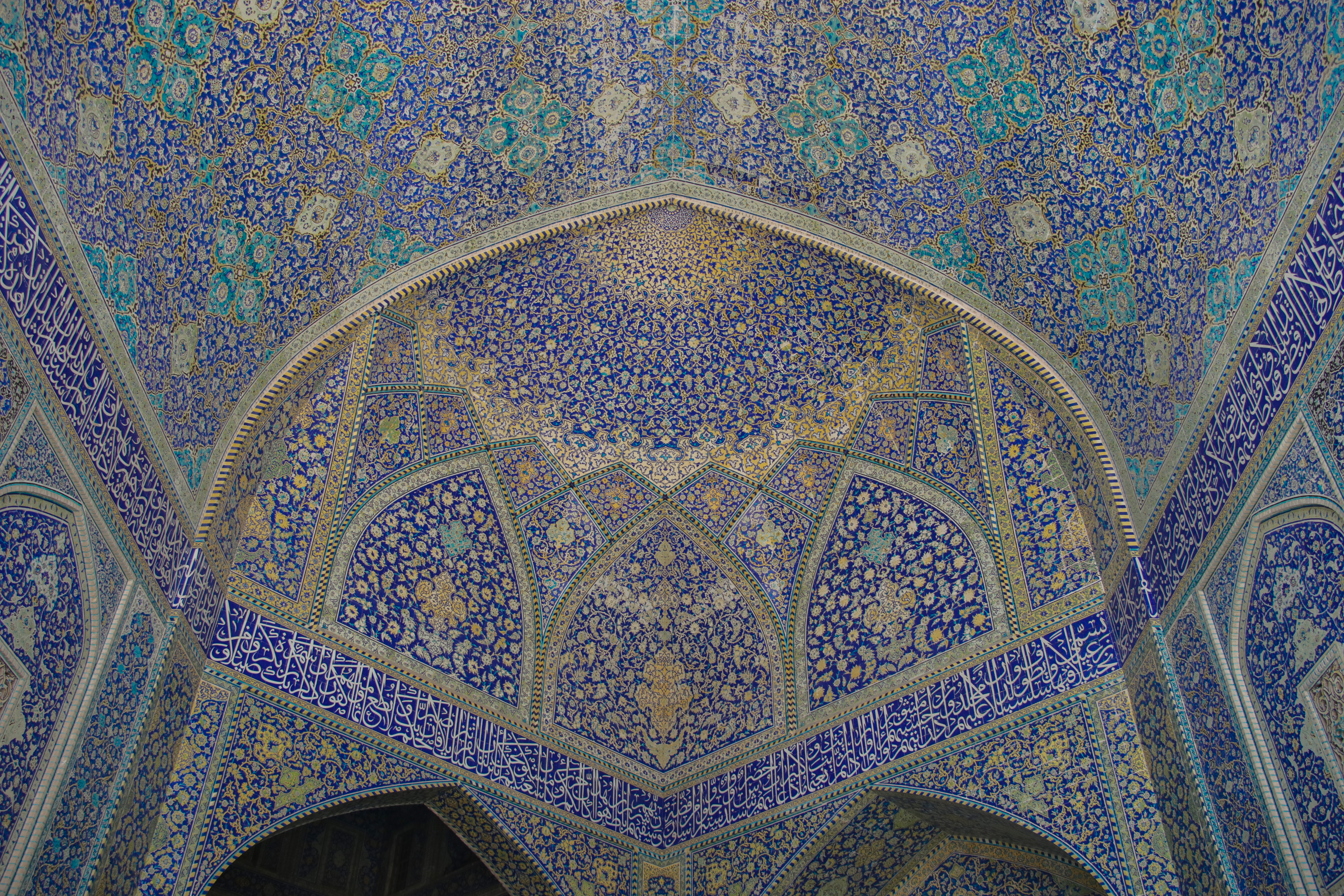
Complete haft-rang decoration. Shah Mosque (Isfahan)

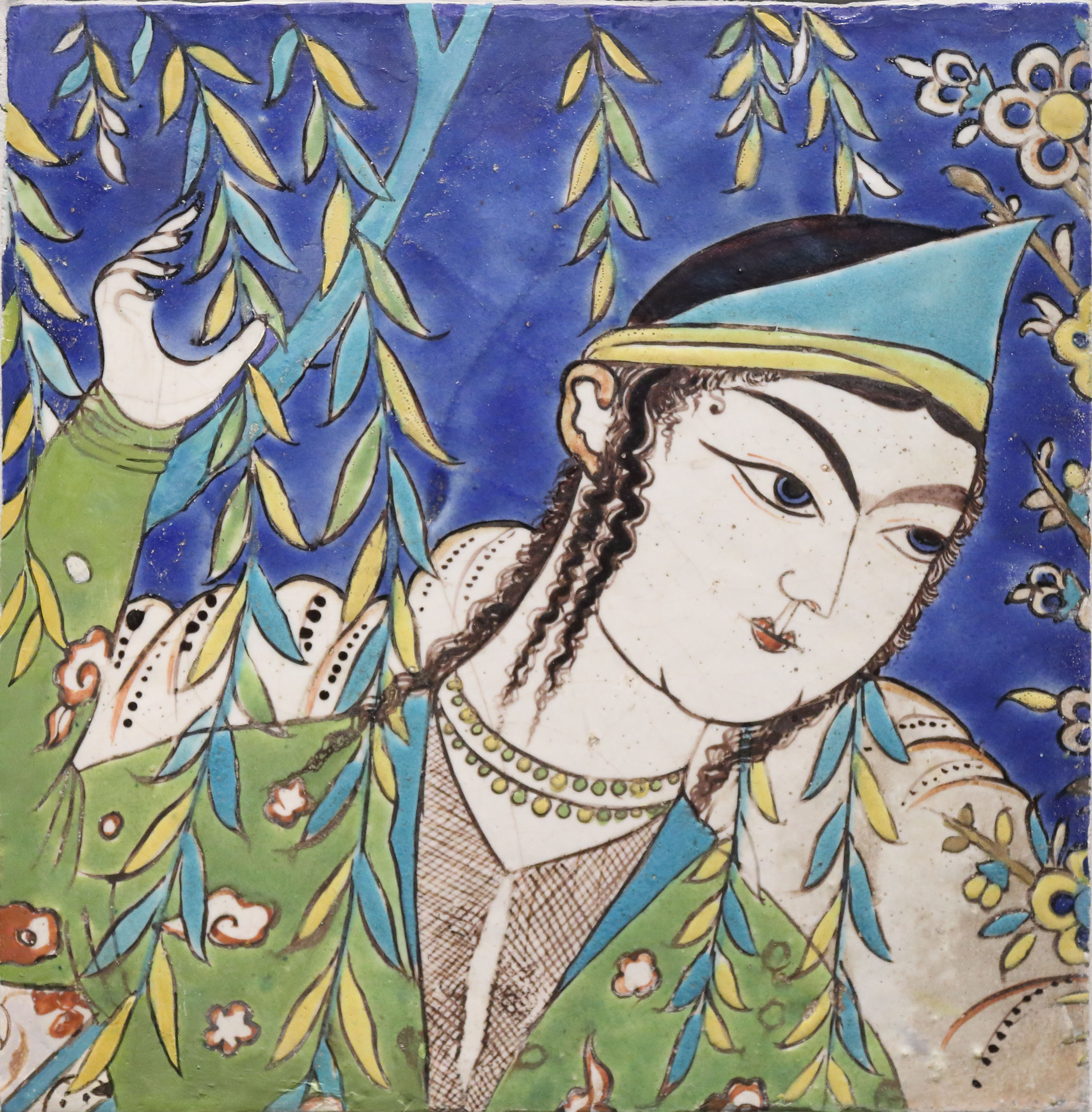
Tile from Isfahan in Iran, 17th century

== See also ==
- Cuerda seca
- Persian art
