= Musalla complex =

Timurid ruins in Herat, Afghanistan

- د مصلی ترکيبي (Pashto) مجتمع مصلی (Dari)
- Musallah complex, Gauhar Shad Musallah
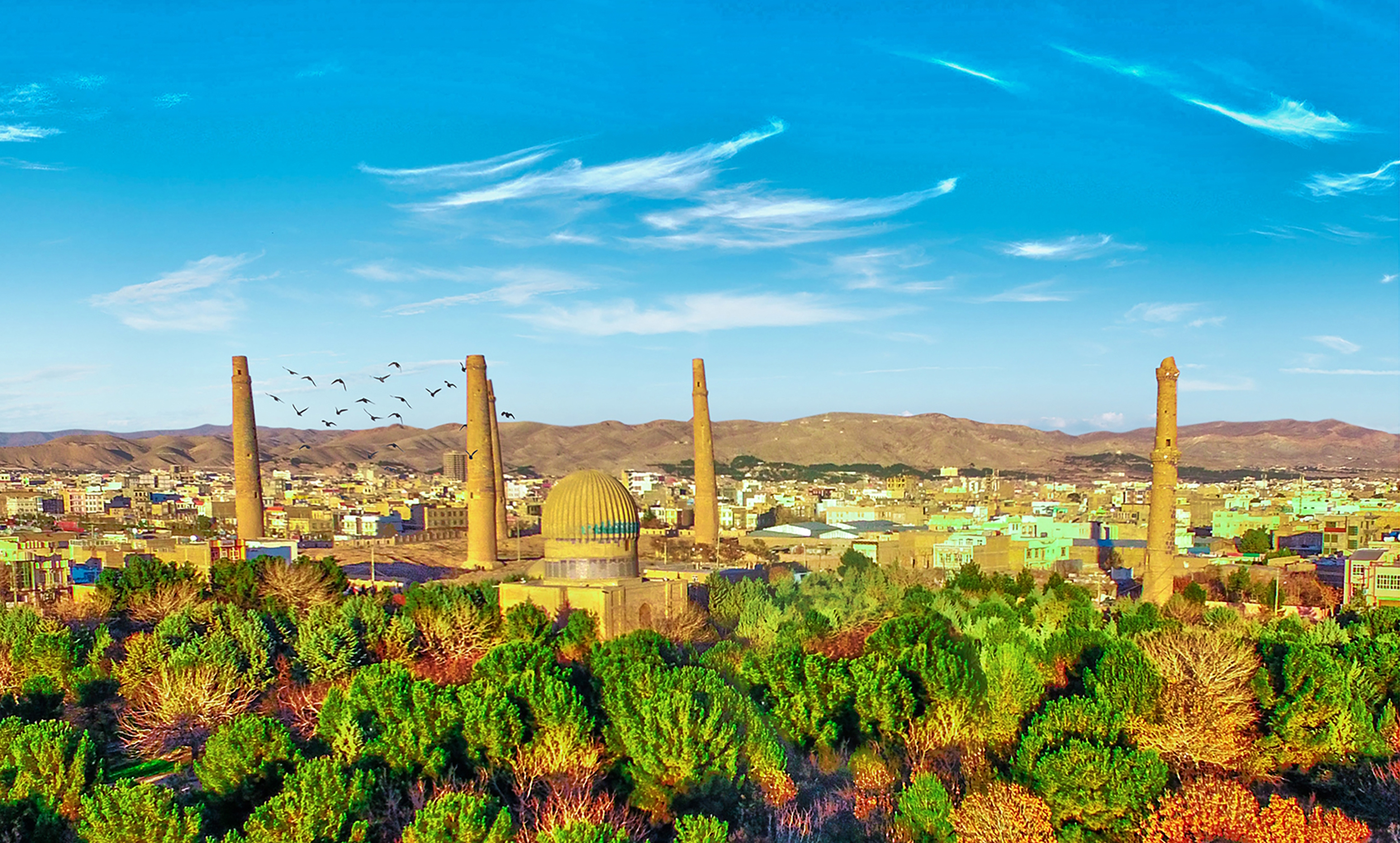
- Overview of the Musalla Complex, with the Gawhar Shad Mausoleum in the center

- Location in Afghanistan
- 34°21′33″N 62°11′10″E
- Type: Islamic religious complex
- Cultures: Islamic
- Location: Herat, Afghanistan
- Region: Herat Province

History
- Built: 1417
- Built by: Queen Goharshad of Timurid Empire of Herāt
- Abandoned: 1885
- Event(s): Ruins, razed in 1885

Site notes
- Height: 55 m (180 ft)
- Architectural style: Timurid
- Condition: Ruined
- Public access: Yes

The Musalla complex (Pashto: د مصلی ترکيبي, Dari: مجتمع مصلی; lit. 'prayer complex'), also known as the Musallah complex or the Musalla of Gawhar Shah, is a former Islamic religious complex located in Herat, Afghanistan, containing examples of Timurid architecture. Much of the 15th-century complex is in ruins today, and the buildings that still stand are in need of restoration. The complex ruins consist of the five Musallah Minarets of Herat, the Mir Ali Sher Navai mausoleum, the Gawhar Shad Mausoleum, the ruins of the Gawhar Shad mosque, the Gawhar Shad madrasa complex, and the Sultan Husayn Bayqara madrasa and mausoleum complex.

Construction of the complex began in 1417 under Queen Gawharshad, chief consort of Timurid ruler Shah Rukh, and ended in the late 1400s with the building of a madrassa by Sultan Husayn Bayqara. It was seriously damaged in 1885 during the Panjdeh incident, when the British and ruling Emir of Afghanistan demolished most of the complex buildings. Due to earthquakes and war, four additional minarets fell during the course of the 20th century.

== History ==
Shah Rukh made Herat the capital of the Timurid Empire in 1405, moving it from Samarkand. The complex was then commissioned by Timurid Queen Gawhar Shad and construction began in 1417, likely under architect Kavamad-Din of Shiraz who also built a similar madrasa in Khar Gerd. The madrasa was built between 1417 and 1426, possibly as late as c. 1432. The complex had two minarets by its eastern façade on either side of the main entrance and the mausoleum in its northwest corner. The Gawhar Shad Mosque was completed in 1437. A madrasa by Sultan Husayn Bayqara called Madrasa Ni'matiyya was built sometime between 1469 and 1506, probably around 1493 (898 AH).

=== Destruction ===
The Musalla complex was heavily damaged in the late 19th century. The buildings of the complex were destroyed in 1885 by Anglo-Afghan forces, only leaving a few minarets and the Gawhar Shad Mausoleum. During the Panjdeh incident of 1885, Russian soldiers had attacked Afghan soldiers southeast of Merv. Most of the buildings in the complex were leveled by the British and Emir Abdur Rahman Khan in order to prevent the Russians from using the buildings as cover. Only the Gawhar Shad mausoleum and nine of the original twenty minarets were allowed to remain. The Heratis had petitioned Abdur Rahman to save the complex, but he responded that saving the living was more important than saving the dead's resting places. Ultimately the crisis was resolved, and fighting never broke out, making the destruction unnecessary. Nine minarets and two mausoleums were spared destruction.

An earthquake in 1932 destroyed two of the mosque's four minarets, and another earthquake in 1951 destroyed another, leaving only one standing. Only five of the original twenty minarets in the complex remained in 2021.

The complex was visited and photographed in the 1930s by the travel writers Robert Byron and Annemarie Schwarzenbach. Byron's book, The Road to Oxiana, mentions the minarets and discusses Timurid history. The mausoleum of 'Ali Shir Nawa'i was rebuilt in 1950.

=== Preservation efforts ===
By the 20th century, the mausoleum had been extensively damaged, with the cupola in particular being severely deteriorated. Intervention in the 1950s supervised and led by Fikri Saljuqi resulted in drastically changing the appearance of the building, with construction of an entirely new eastern façade and a partly new southern facade, and the hexagonal Mihrab being demolished and replaced with a rectangular one. The interior dome was decorated and mosaics were installed on the outside walls to a height of one metre (3 ft 3 in). Restoration and repairs to the mausoleum often were of poor quality using inappropriate materials.

The United Nations Educational, Scientific and Cultural Organization (UNESCO) along with Italian architect Andrea Bruno began preliminary conservation and restoration efforts in 1974–75. Work started on the minarets of the Nicmatiyya madrassa in April 1977. A year later, structural reinforcement started in cooperation with the Democratic Republic of Afghanistan government. Its aim was to restore the faience decoration and to prevent masonry erosion. The work was slowed due to a lack of steel piping. While close to finishing the mosque restoration, Herat's March 1979 uprising and the resultant suppression caused work to end. UNESCO returned briefly in 1989 to review the situation.

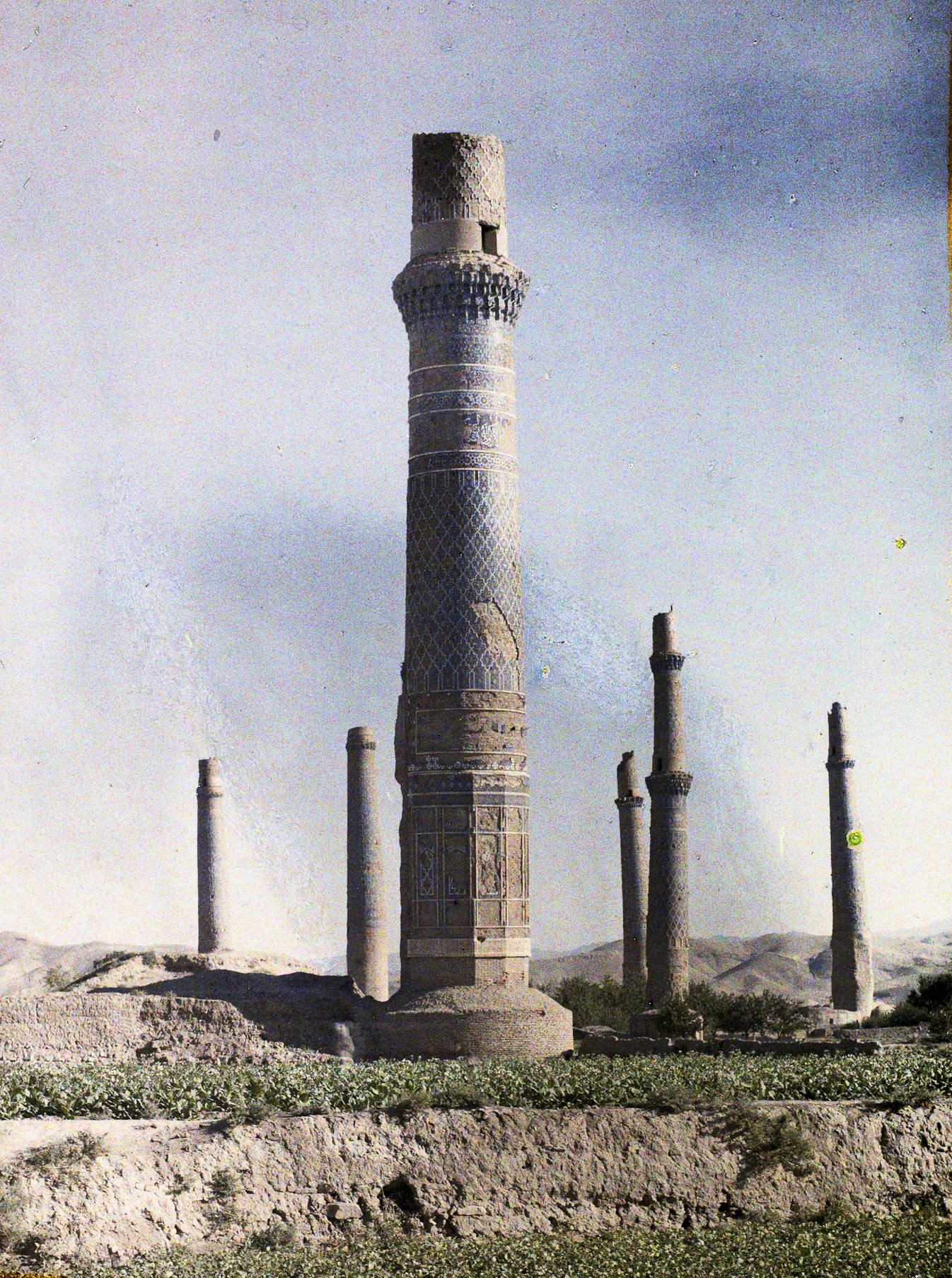
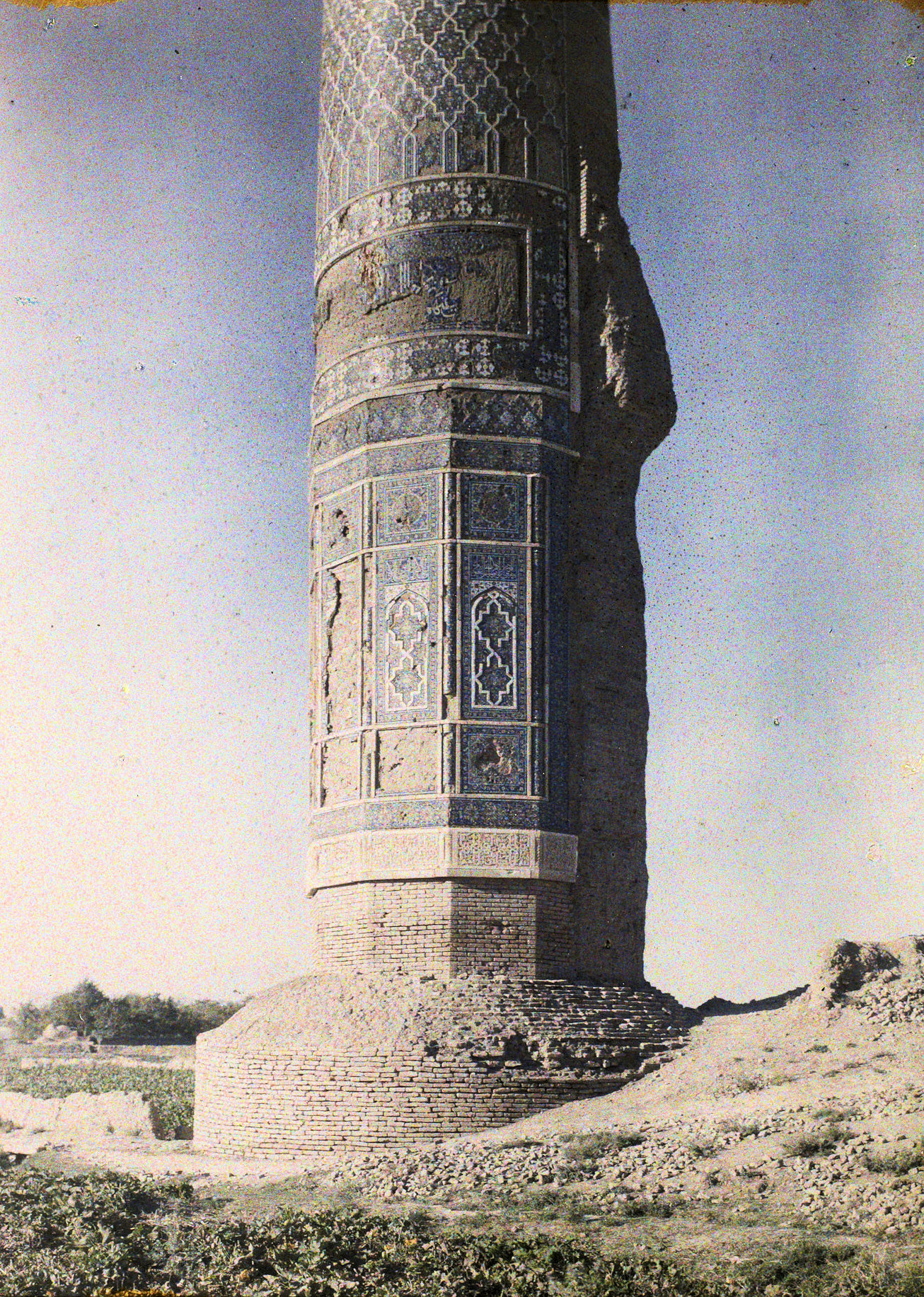
The Gawhar Shad Mosque south-eastern minaret (minaret No.8) in 1928, now lost.

During the Soviet–Afghan War, the mausoleum and minarets suffered additional damage. Herat was the only urban battlefield during the war, and historical buildings were often targeted to lower morale. The mausoleum's roof was struck in 1984–1985 and lost several tiles, especially on the northern and western portions. At the bottom of the dome, writing in Kufic was partially destroyed on the eastern side and completely gone on the north. The 1950 eastern façade was hit by a shell and repaired with regular bricks. Evidence of the former connections to the madrasa to the east and south was destroyed. Its inner square chamber remained in good condition. The last minaret that stood at the corners of the mosque was almost completely destroyed by Soviet heavy artillery during this period, leaving only 12 m (39 ft) of its base remaining. The middle minaret also suffered damage, with tile work in the best condition on the southern side and partly remaining on the eastern side. The balcony supports were destroyed and shells hit the minaret. A two-metre (6 ft 7 in) hole was created 17 m (56 ft) up, exposing the staircase inside. A scar two meters below the hole was also created. The eastern minaret in the southeast corner was the most affected of the four eastern minarets: two holes were created by howitzers 30 m (98 ft) off the ground and 2 metres in diameter. Further repairs were conducted by the Danish Committee for Aid to Afghan Refugees (DACAAR) and the WFP between 1992 and 1994. DACAAR added masonry and covered the dome of the mausoleum along with the base with a thin layer of cement.

Emergency preservation work was carried out at the site in 2001 by the Society for the Preservation of Afghanistan's Cultural Heritage (SPACH). These efforts included erecting walls to protect the mausoleum and Sultan Husain Madrasa, restoring garden landscaping at the mausoleum, and measures to forestall the collapse of the Gawhar Shad Madrasa's remaining minaret. In 2014, UNESCO and the Afghanistan government coordinated to attempt to preserve and replicate the tile work on the exterior dome. In 2004, UNESCO added the City of Herat, including the entire Musalla complex, to the Tentative List of UNESCO World Heritage Sites.

During the occupation of Afghanistan, Soviet troops used the site as a base. Mujahedeen fighters launched attacks against the troops stationed there and the Soviet forces laid anti-personnel mines around the base of the minarets. In 2015 the landmine clearance NGO The HALO Trust began work clearing the site of mines following an accident in which a young man playing football stood on an anti-personnel mine and lost a foot. The site was cleared of mines by May 2016.

In 2020, the Aga Khan Development Network made a pledge to the President of Afghanistan to restore a minaret in danger of collapsing. This work is being completed through the work of the Aga Khan Trust for Culture.

== Description ==
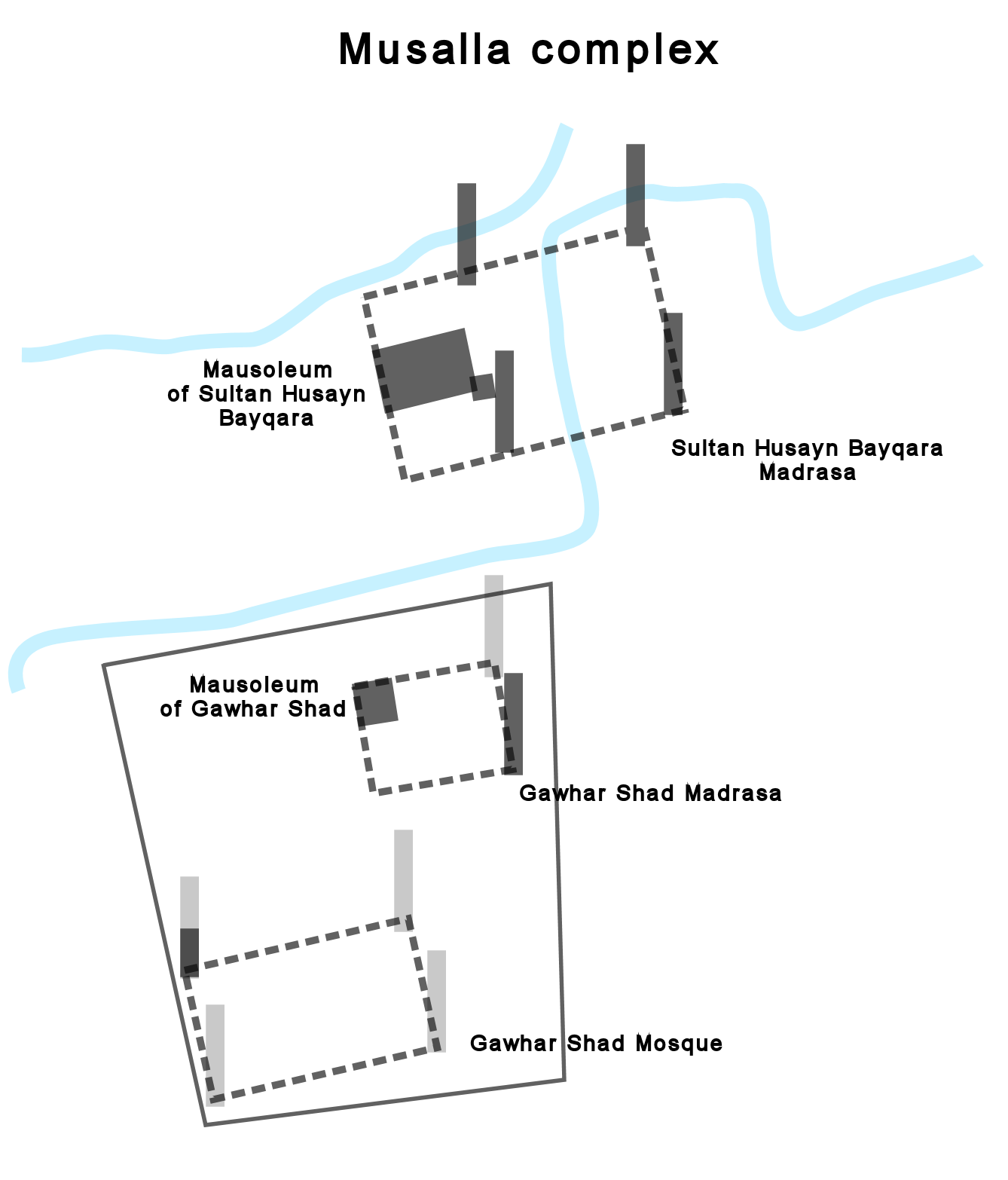
Plan of the Musalla complex, Herat. Remaining minarets are shown in a darker shade.

The Timurids built the complex initially north of the city along the Khiyaban avenue 1.6 km (1 mi) north of Darvaza-yi Malik. The location was convenient because of its close vicinity to the royal residence in the Bagh-i Zaghan. In 2015, Herat's suburbs were surrounding the site. The complex was centered around a musalla 106 m × 64 m (348 ft × 210 ft). The inner court had four iwans, with two arcades going around it. The madrasa with the mausoleum in its corner was built to the northwest Mosque. Husayn Bayqara's madrassa was built to the northwest of Gawhar Shad's madrasa. There was also the mausoleum of Ali-Shir Nava'i between the ruins of the madrasas. Across from the mausoleum of Gawhar Shad there was the tomb of Sheikh Zadeh Abdallah. Abdallah's tomb was octagonal with four iwans, with the north iwan being the largest.

=== Minarets ===
The complex had 20 minarets adorned with tiles in intricate patterns and designs. By 2002, the five remaining Musalla Minarets of Herat had their tiles scattered on the ground around them.

The minarets are each 55 metres (180 ft) tall, braced with steel cables.

Nine towers survived the events of 1885, but the explosions had weakened them structurally, and they remained neglected over the next few years due to an unsettled political situation. No repairs or restorations were undertaken, and over time, four more towers collapsed due to structural weaknesses, earthquake and sheer decrepitude. Only five of the original twenty minarets survived.

=== Sultan Husayn Bayqara madrasa (1492–3) ===
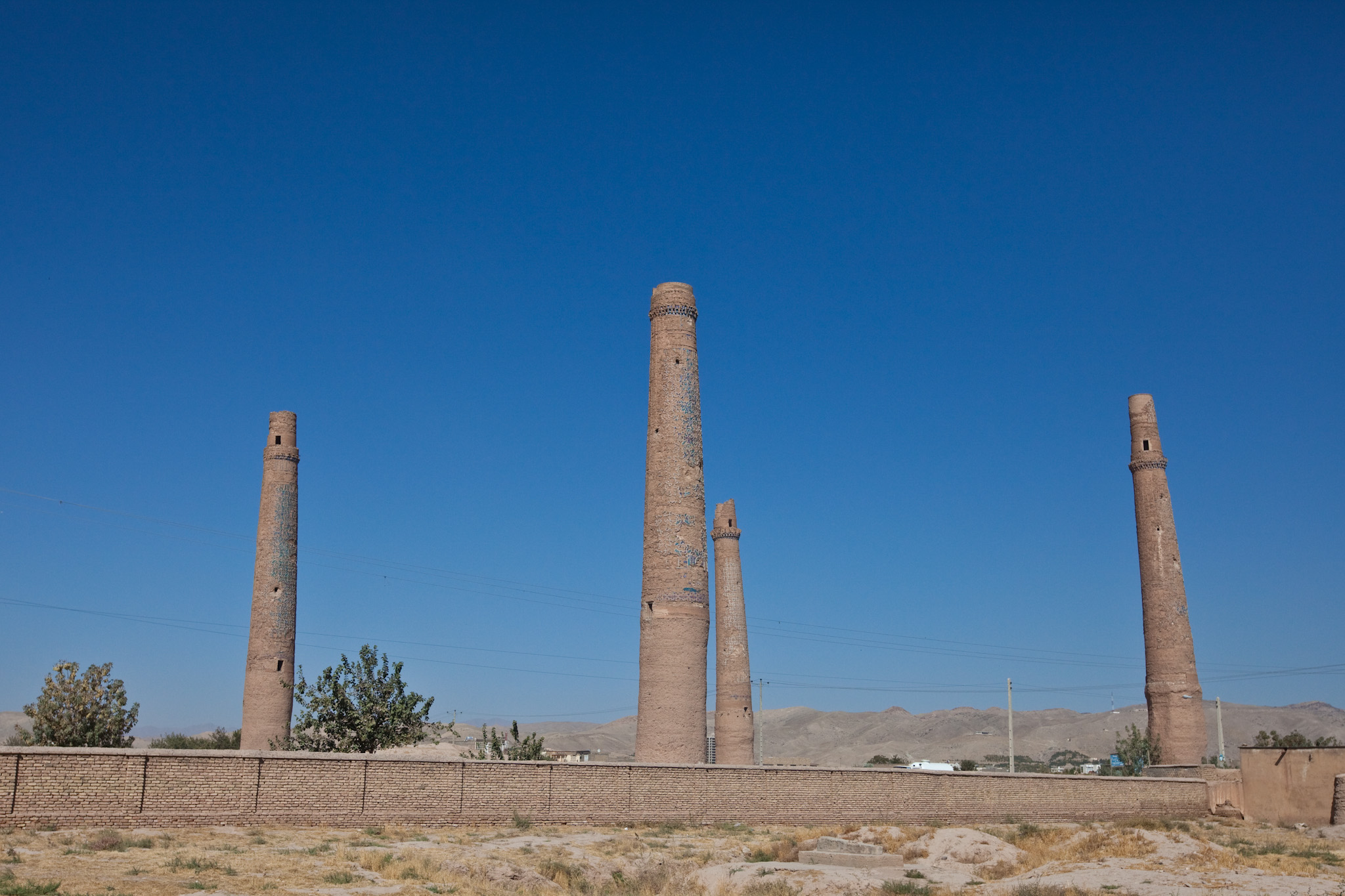
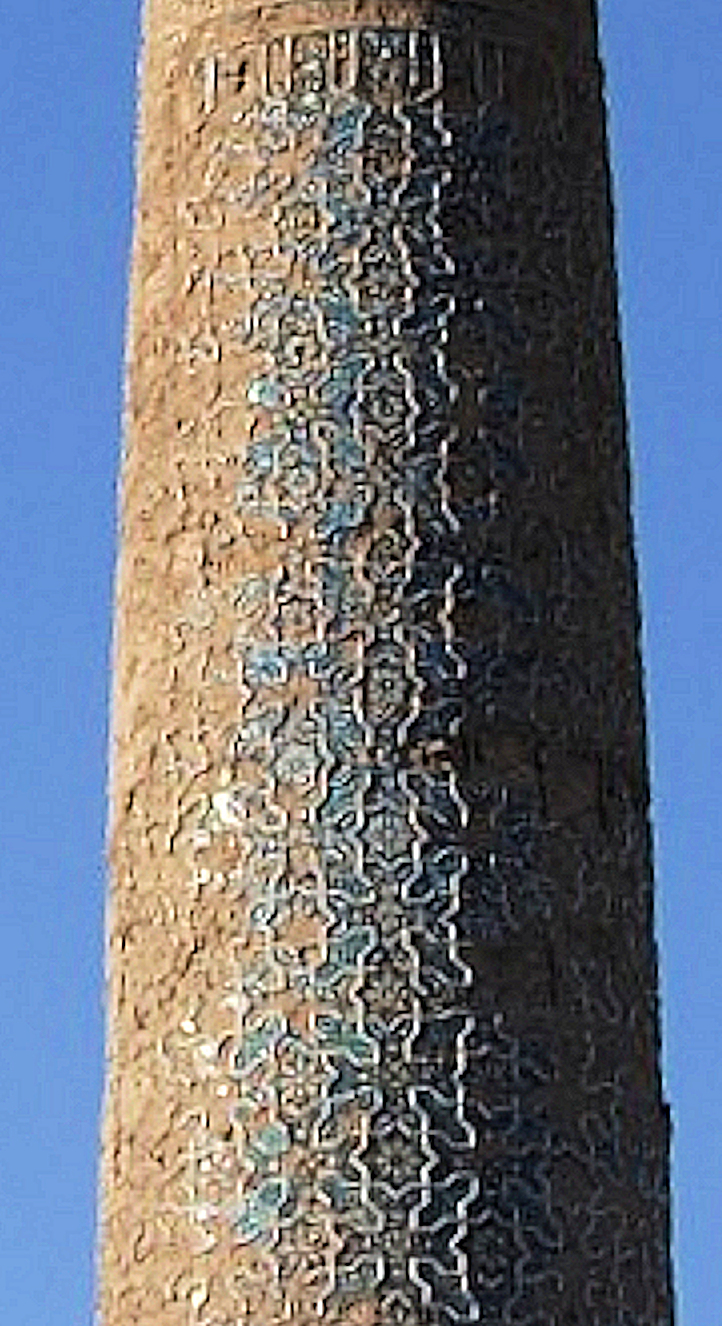
The four minarets of the Sultan Husayn Bayqara madrasa and mausoleum, and tile mosaics on one of the minarets

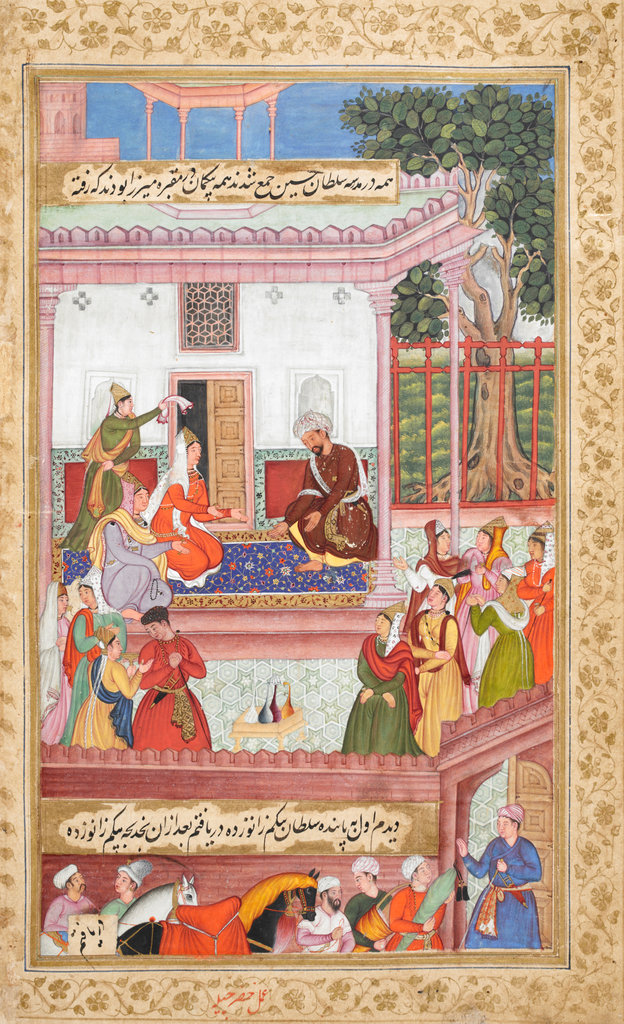
Babur visiting the Begums in "Sultan Husayn Bayqara’s madrasa at his mausoleum in Herat", in 1506. Baburnama (1590).

Sultan Husayn Bayqara's madrasa was built circa 1492–3, to the north of the Gawhar Shad Mosque and Gawhar Shad madrasa. Only ruins of the mausoleum and the four minarets, originally set at the angles of the madrasa, remain to this day. There are no known depictions of the monument built by Bayqara, but the remains of fine enamel tileworks on the minarets are a testimony to his past splendour. Babur, the future founder of the Mughal Empire, who visited Herat immediately after Sultan Husayn Bayqara'death in May 1506, confirmed that he was buried there in the mausoleum next to the madrassa.

The four eastern minarets stood at the corners of Sultan Husayn Bayqara's Ni'matiyya madrasa before it was demolished, and outlined a courtyard 103 m × 105 m (338 ft × 344 ft). They had one balcony each and were a brighter blue than the four minarets that stood in the west. When built, they were at least 70 m (230 ft) tall. Due to wind and changes in temperature, they all lean westward. The minarets had an ornate turquoise tile covering before it was destroyed. Robert Byron wrote it "was as if one saw the sky through a net of shining hair planted suddenly with flowers". There were also two tall arches over an entrance, depicted in 1887. The tombstone of Bayqara's grandfather, called the Stone of the Seven Pens, is nearby.

Minarets of Ni'Matiyya Madrasa
Designation	Location	Height		Lean (Note: A measurement of how off-balance the minaret is)	
Designation	Location	m	ft	cm	in
M1: Minar-i Nahbas	Southwest	51.83	170.0	70	28
M2	Northwest	54.75	179.6	50	20
M3	Northeast	58.23	191.0	200	79
M4	Southeast	58.72	192.7	170	67

The four minarets in the west stood at the corners of the former mosque and outlined a court 350 m × 210 m (1,150 ft × 690 ft). These were wider, eight-sided, and had one balcony each. They were supported by white marble panels and the color of grape-blue. Three fell due to earthquakes in the 20th century. The remaining minaret, called Minar-i Nahbas, stood in the southwest. It was 37.5 m (123 ft) tall before the Soviet–Afghan War. Fakhr-ul Madaris, a religious school with 350 students, was built at its base around 1940, incorporating the minaret into its northern façade. Both minaret and school were destroyed by Soviet artillery in 1985, and only 12 m (39 ft) of the minaret's base remains.

The middle minaret with a height of 42.40 m (139 ft 1 in) has two balconies and was decorated with blue lozenges separated by regular bricks with flower mosaics. The top of the minaret (above the second balcony) was hit by artillery and destroyed. It had a lean of 90 cm (35 in) before the Soviet–Afghan War which had extended to 350 cm (140 in) by 1998. The minaret was one of a pair that had stood at the sides of the entrance to the madrasa.

=== Gawhar Shad Mosque (1417–1438) ===
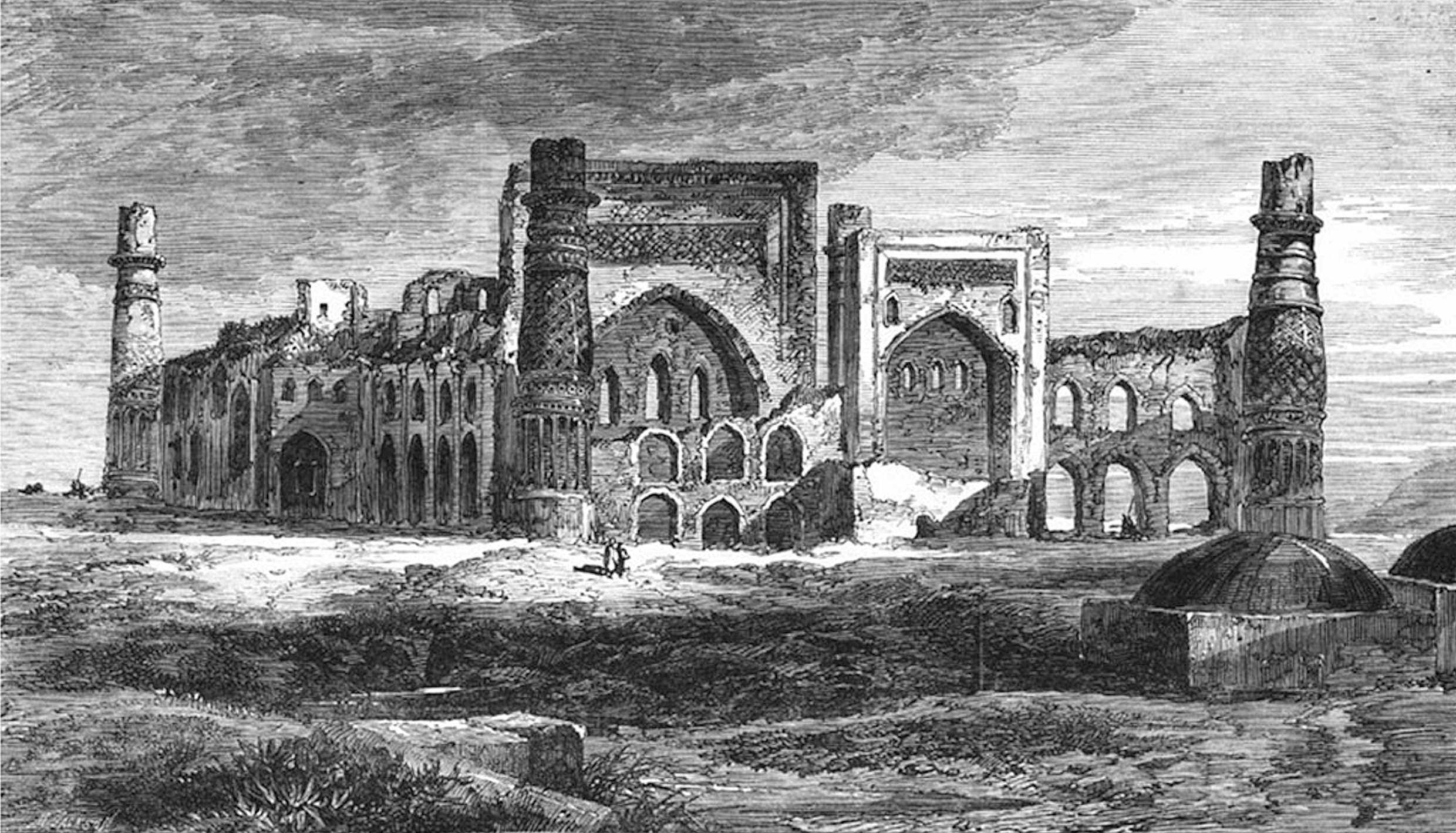
Gawhar Shad Mosque in Herat. Illustrated London News, 1863

The Gawhar Shad Mosque in Herat was built by Gawhar Shad. It is located in the southwestern corner of the Musalla complex.

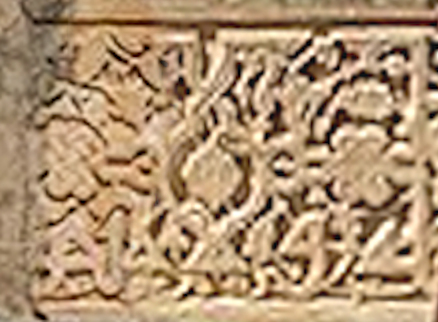
Decorative slab, from the base of minaret No. 8, Gawhar Shad Mosque.

The mosque was built by the architect Qavam al-Din b. Zayn al-Din Shirazi, after he had finished the Gawhar Shad mosque in Mashhad in 1418. Construction began in 1417–18, and partial completion was achieved in 1437–38. The mosque measured c. 130 by 74 metres (427 by 243 ft), and was built around a four-iwan structure and crowned by four minarets. The decoration consisted in blue glazed tiles, in a style similar to that of the nearby Gawhar Shad Mausoleum.

The mosque was demolished by Afghan-British troops in 1885, in the Panjdeh incident. Nothing remains of it, apart from the half-length ruins of the northwestern minaret (minaret No.6). The half-minaret was still nicely decorated in lapis lauzuri tiles in the 1970s, but all decoration has now disappeared.

A few decorative slabs from the base of the minaret have been reused in the Shrine of Khwaja Abd Allah of Herat.

=== Gawhar Shad Madrasa (1417–1438) ===
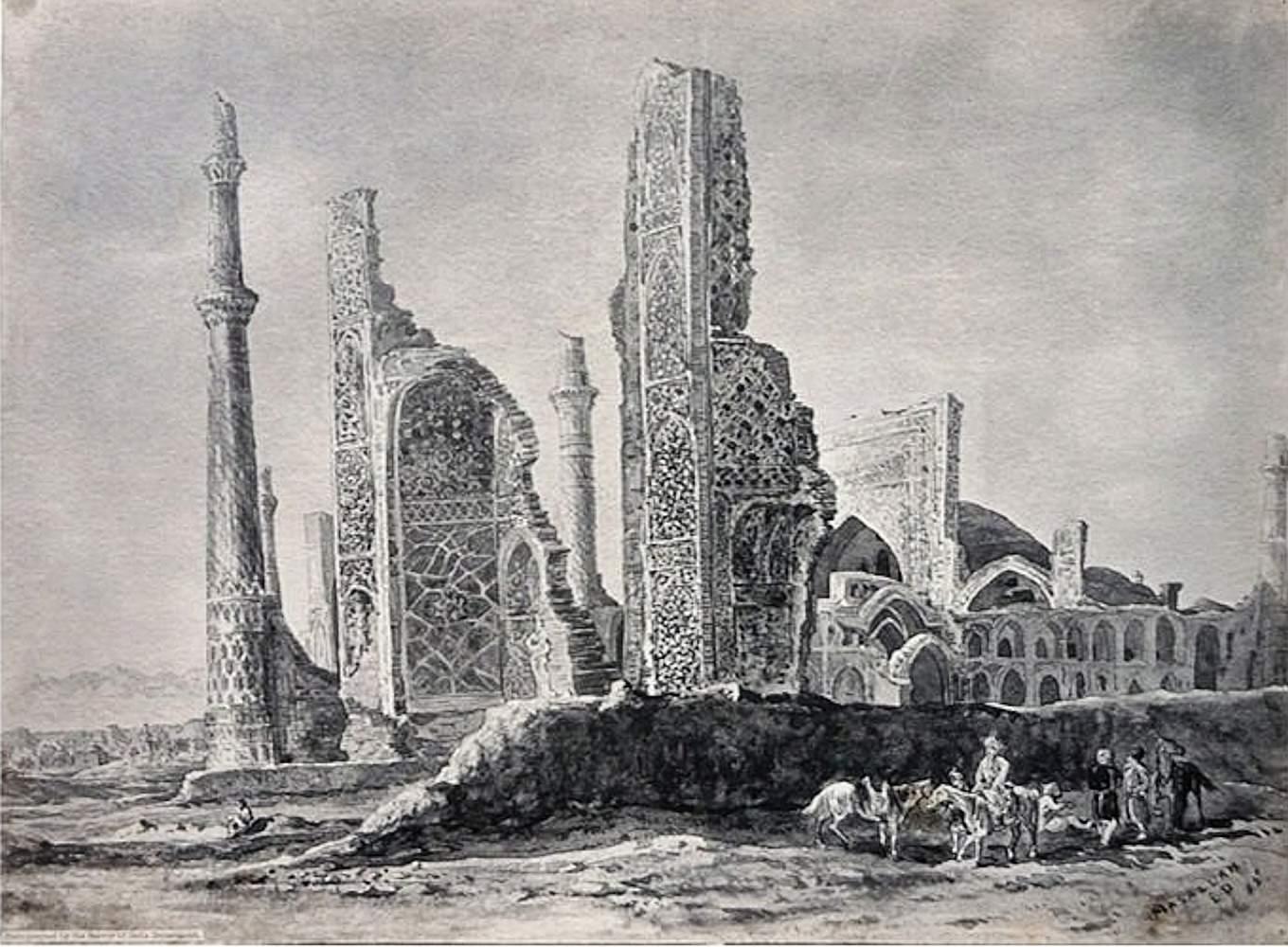
Gawhar Shad Madrasa eastern portal (Herat), from the northeast, with Gawhar Shad Mosque in the background. Durand 1885 (Illustrated London News 87, 1885).

The Gawhar Shad Madrasa was a madrasa in Herat, built by Gawhar Shad, and is part of the Musalla complex.

The madrasa measured approximately 83 by 60.75 metres (272.3 by 199.3 ft) and was built between 1417 and 1438. According to Siraj al-Din Saljuqi the madrasa was decorated "with seven-colour glazed tiles (kashiha-i haft rang) … suls inscriptions …. On the inside … with plaster muqarnas and designs in blue and gold colour, and lapis colour. …. Water was brought from the Jui-i Injil by means of a pipe. On the interior of the external portal vault of the Madrasa a large piece of marble was erected, which bore the following in tall suls script, … written by Jalal Ja’far." A variety of decorative tile techniques are used, from banna’i monochrome turquoise-glazed bricks, to colored-glaze “cloisonné” tile (haft-rang with black lines), to mo'araq cut-tile mosaics.

At the northwest corner of the madrasa was established the Gawhar Shad Mausoleum, completed in 827 AH (1423/1424 CE). The mausoleum now stands alone, since the madrasa has completely disappeared. From the madrasa, only the southeastern minaret (minaret No. 5) remains.

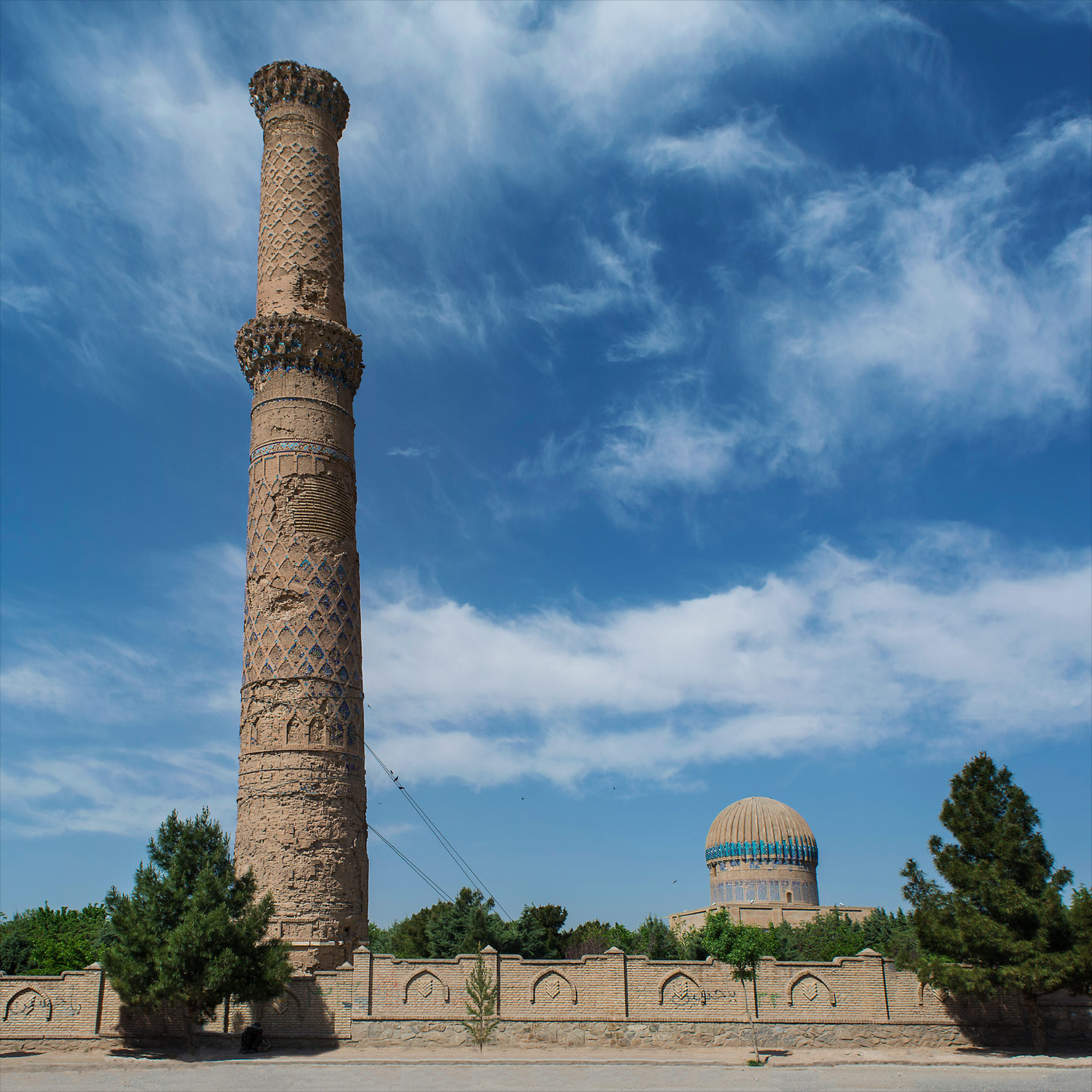
The remains of the madrase today: minaret No. 5, and the Gawhar Shad Mausoleum

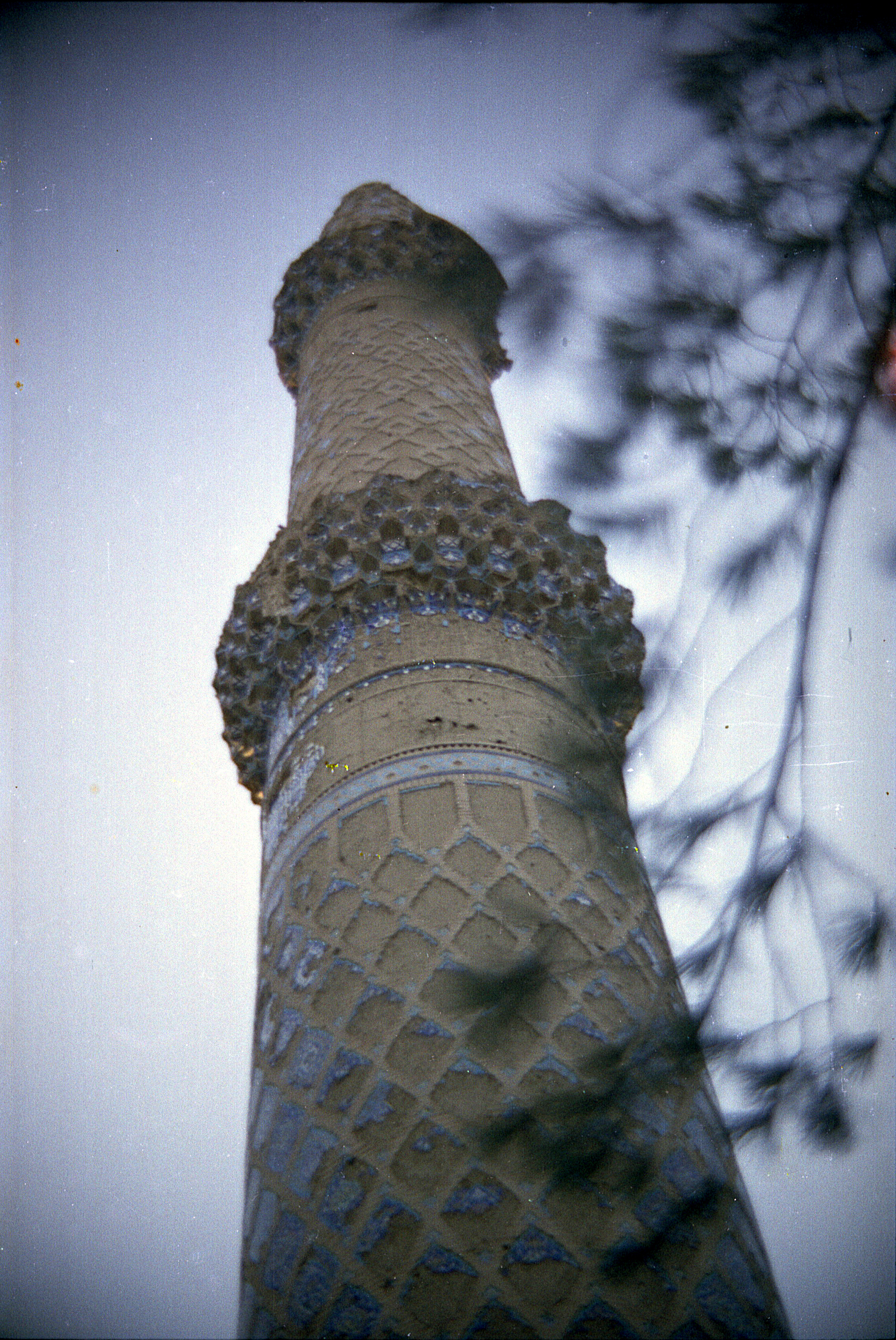
The southeastern minaret of the madrasa (minaret No. 5)

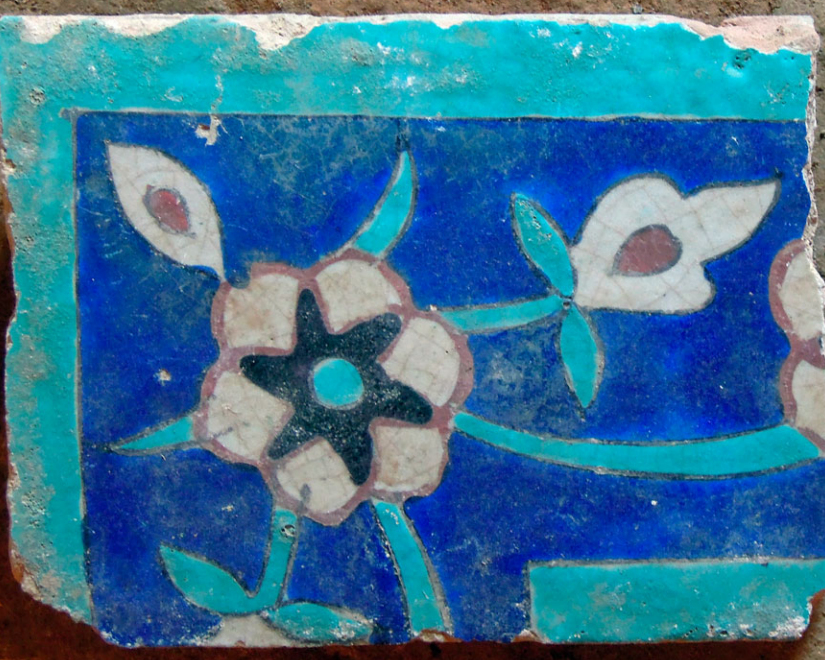
Colored-glaze “cloisonné” tile (haft-rang technique with black line) found in the area of minaret No. 5.

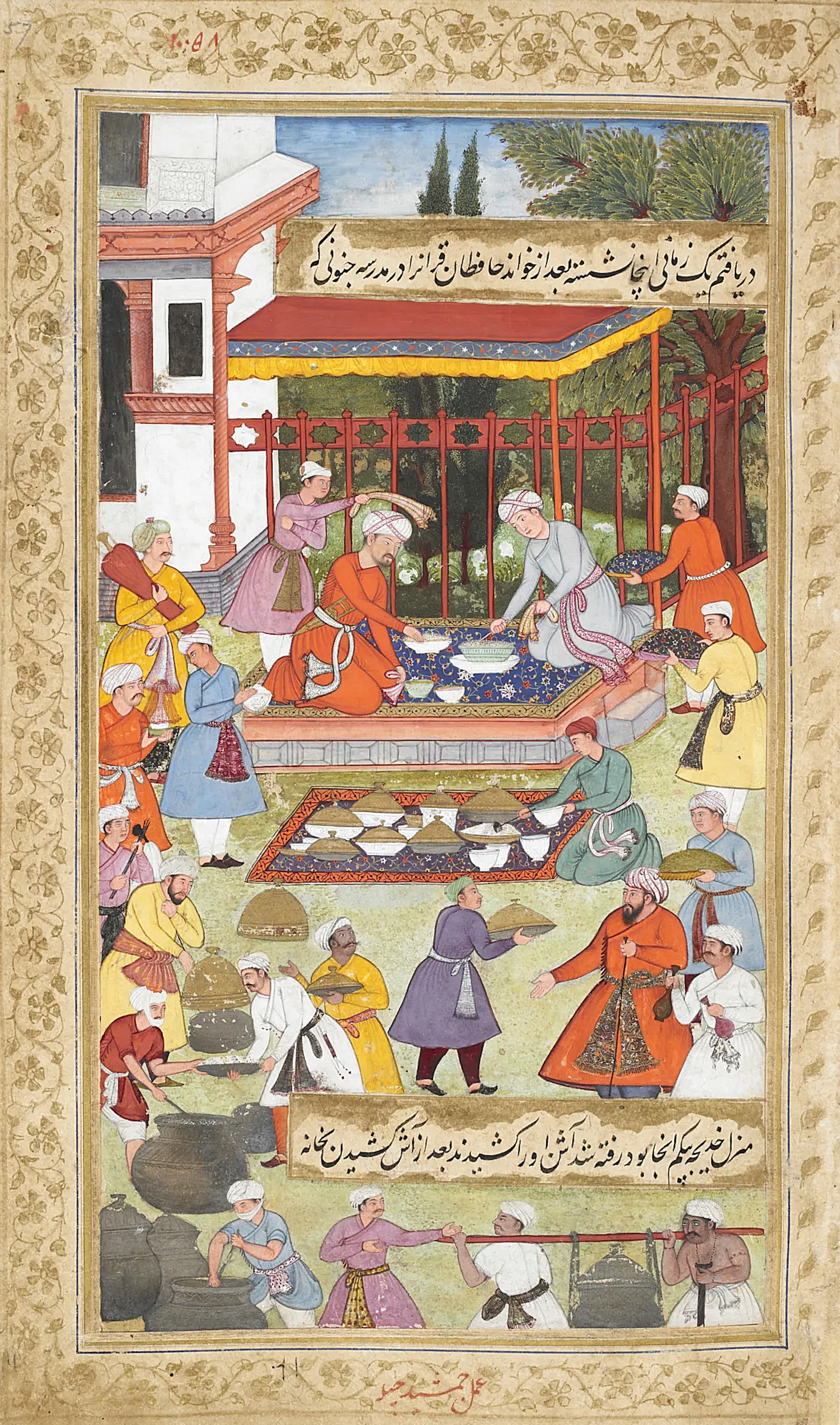
Babur entertained to a meal at the "South madrasa", 1506.

=== Gawhar Shad Mausoleum ===
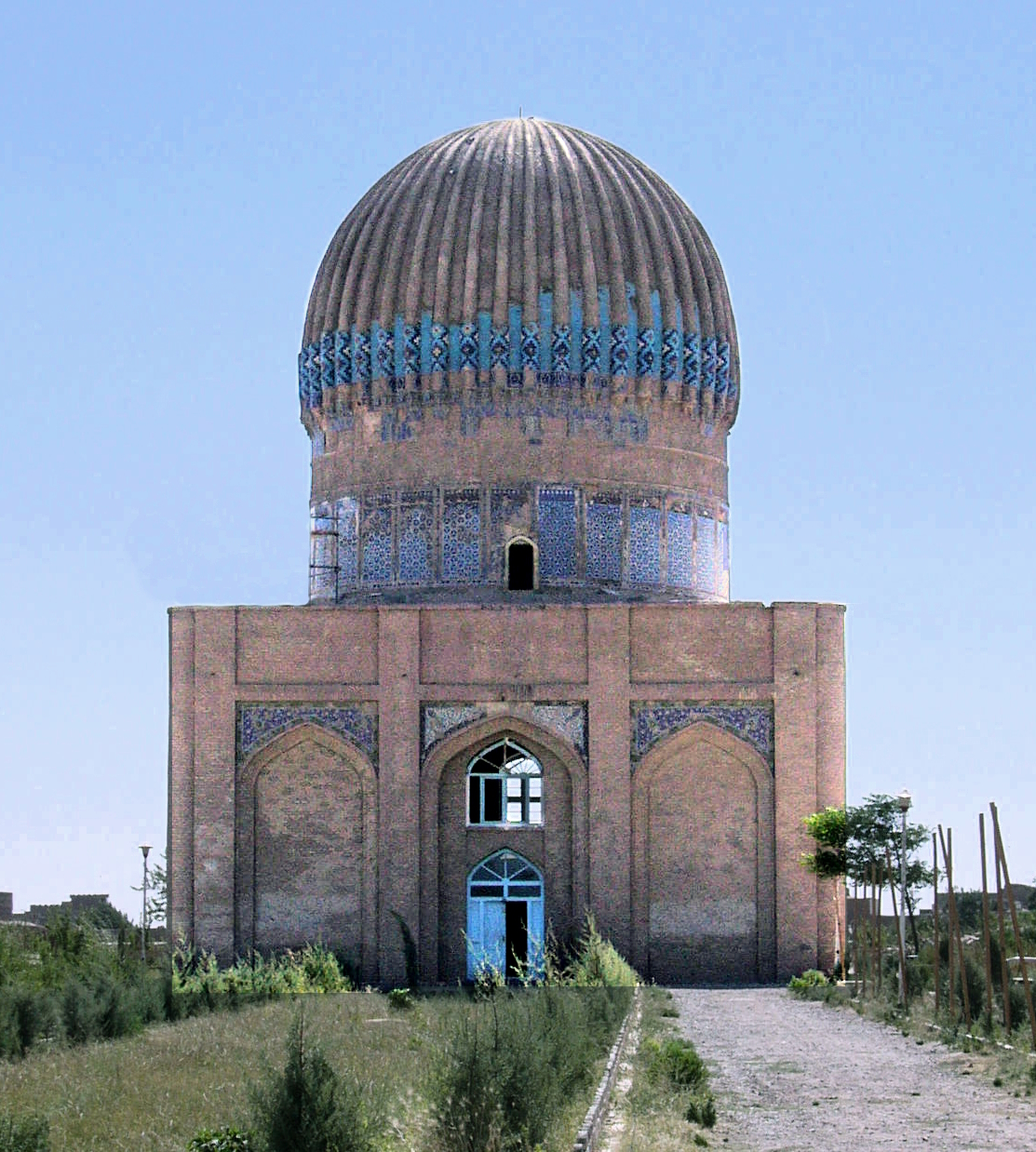
The Gawhar Shad Mausoleum.

The mausoleum was originally constructed to house the remains of Prince Baysunghur, a son of the Timurid ruler Shah Rukh and Gawhar Shad. Some members of Baysunghur's family were interred alongside him. They included Gawhar Shad herself and her brother Amir Sufi Tarkhan, her other son Muhammad Juki, Baysunghur's sons Sultan Muhammad and Ala al-Dawla, as well as the latter's son Ibrahim. More distantly related Timurids, Ahmad and Shah Rukh (sons of Abu Sa'id Mirza, who was responsible for Gawhar Shad's execution), were also buried in the mausoleum. Baysunghur's father Shah Rukh was briefly interred as well, before later being transferred to the Gur-e-Amir in Samarqand.

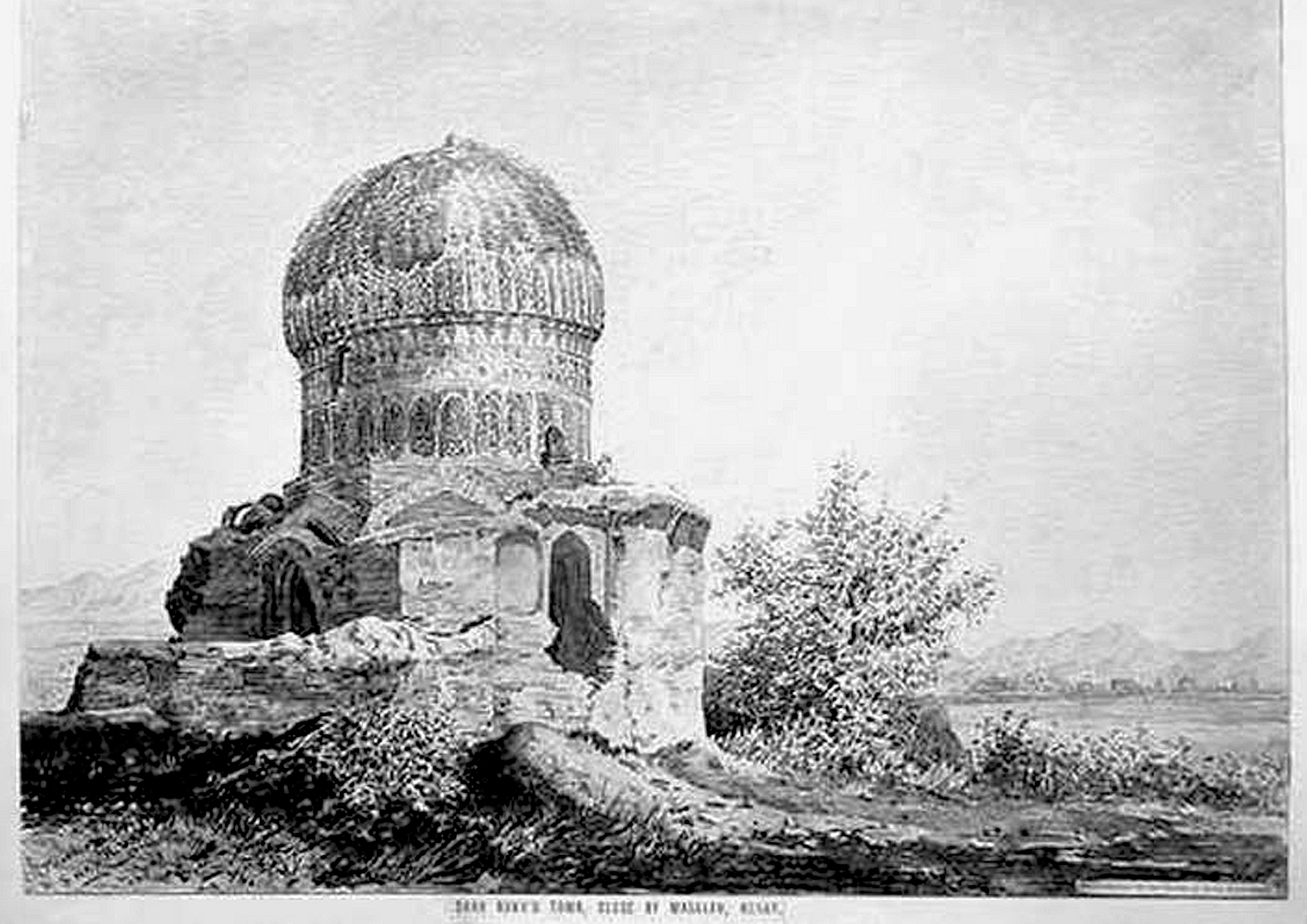
Gawhar Shad Mausoleum in 1885

Gawhar Shad's mausoleum is 27 m (89 ft) tall. It lies is between the two western minarets and was built in the madrasa's northwest corner. The building forms a cruciform shape, with a dome covering the center. This dome is the most impressive feature of the structure, in that it is actually three domes superimposed over one another: a low inner dome, a bulbous outer cupola and a structural dome between them. The outer cupola is decorated with flowery light-blue-green mosaics. The inner dome is adorned with gold leaf, lapis lazuli and other colours which form intricate patterns. The interior of the tomb itself is a square chamber with axial niches.

Due to the widespread habit of tombstones being taken and re-used, it is unknown how many burials there are in the mausoleum. Though some sources claim there were as many as twenty grave markers at one time, at present there are only six. Lying in the center of the room, they are oblong shaped and made of matt black stone, with floral patterns carved on them. There are two larger stones, three smaller cenotaphs, and a child-sized tomb.

In 1998, some objects were located inside the mausoleum to preserve them and prevent robbery. They include twelve 100 cm × 60 cm (39 in × 24 in) marble slabs, a piece of the base of a minaret rising from the mosque, a large slab with seven lines of writing, and other marble panels.

== Gallery ==
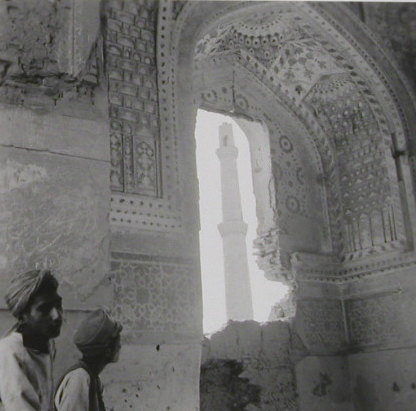
Photo by Annemarie Schwarzenbach, 1939

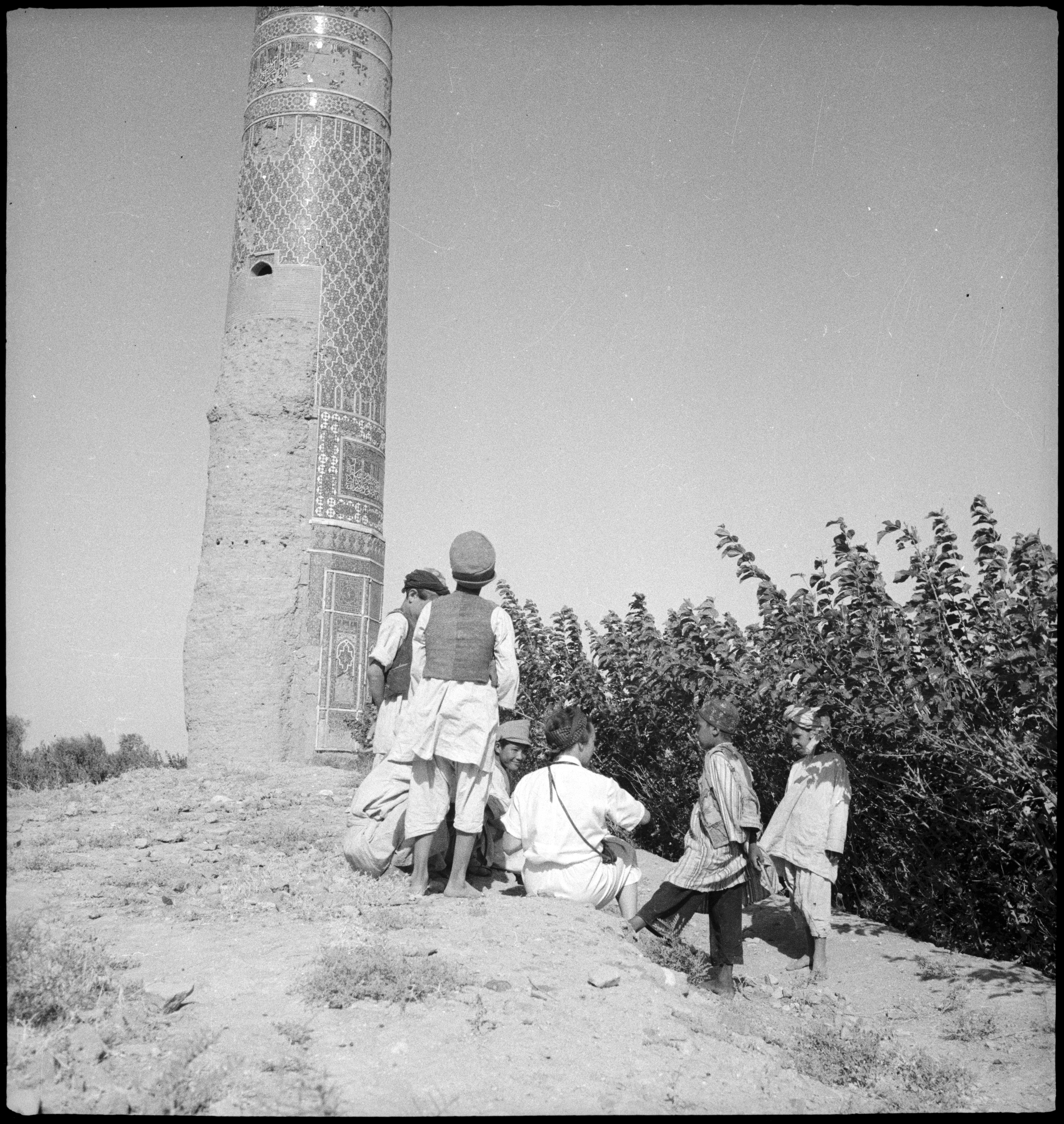
Photo by Annemarie Schwarzenbach, 1939

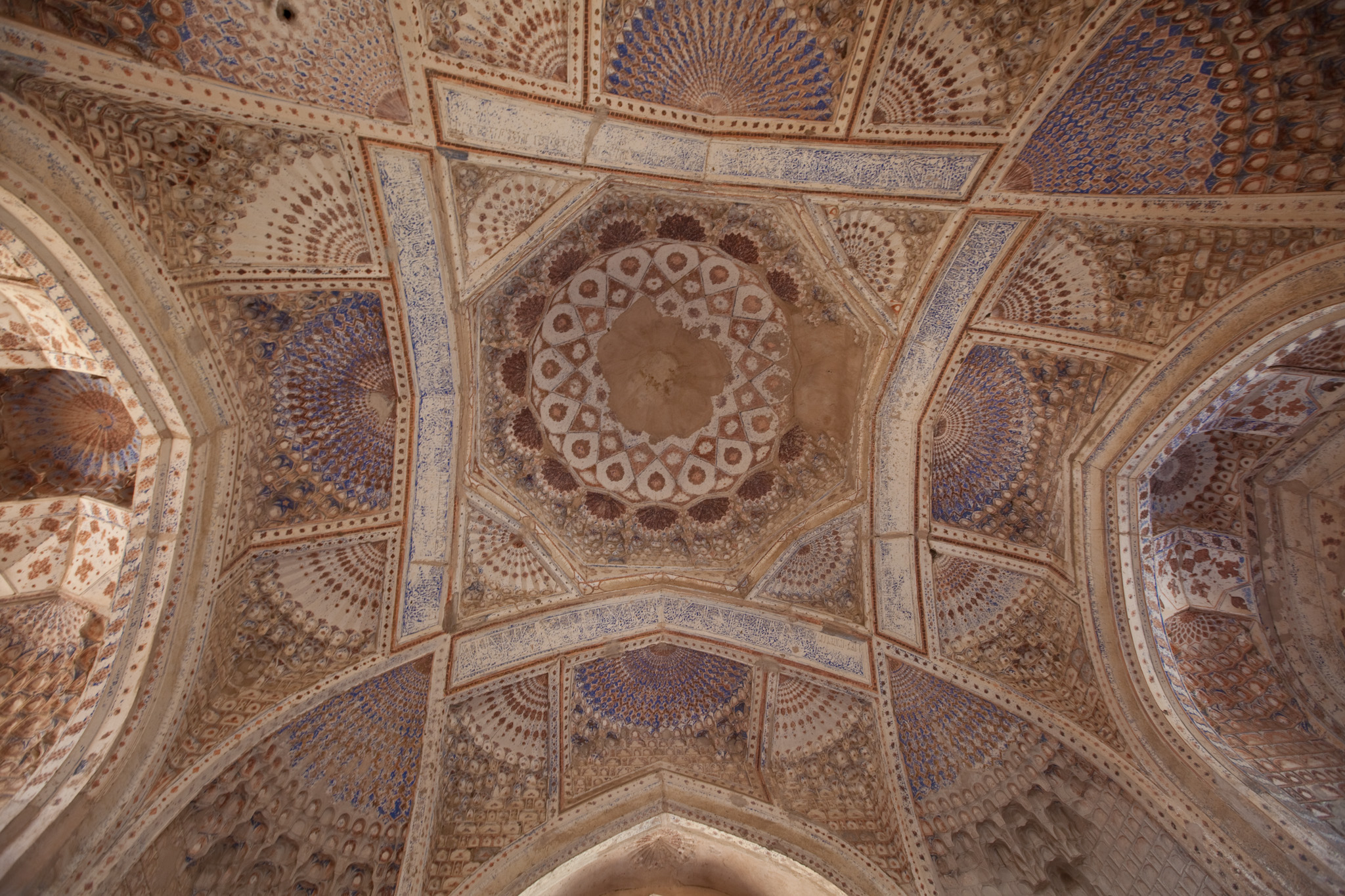
Dome interior, 2009

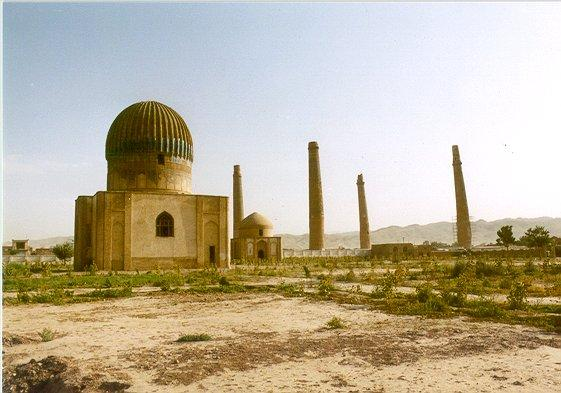
Ruined Gawhar Shad Mausoleum

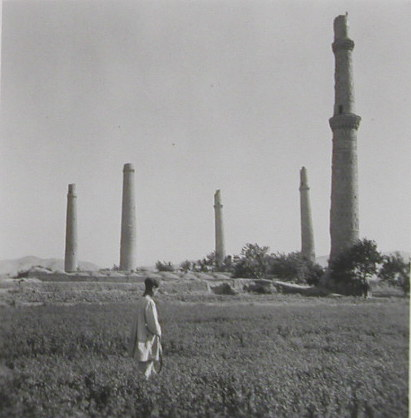
Remaining minarets in 1939–40

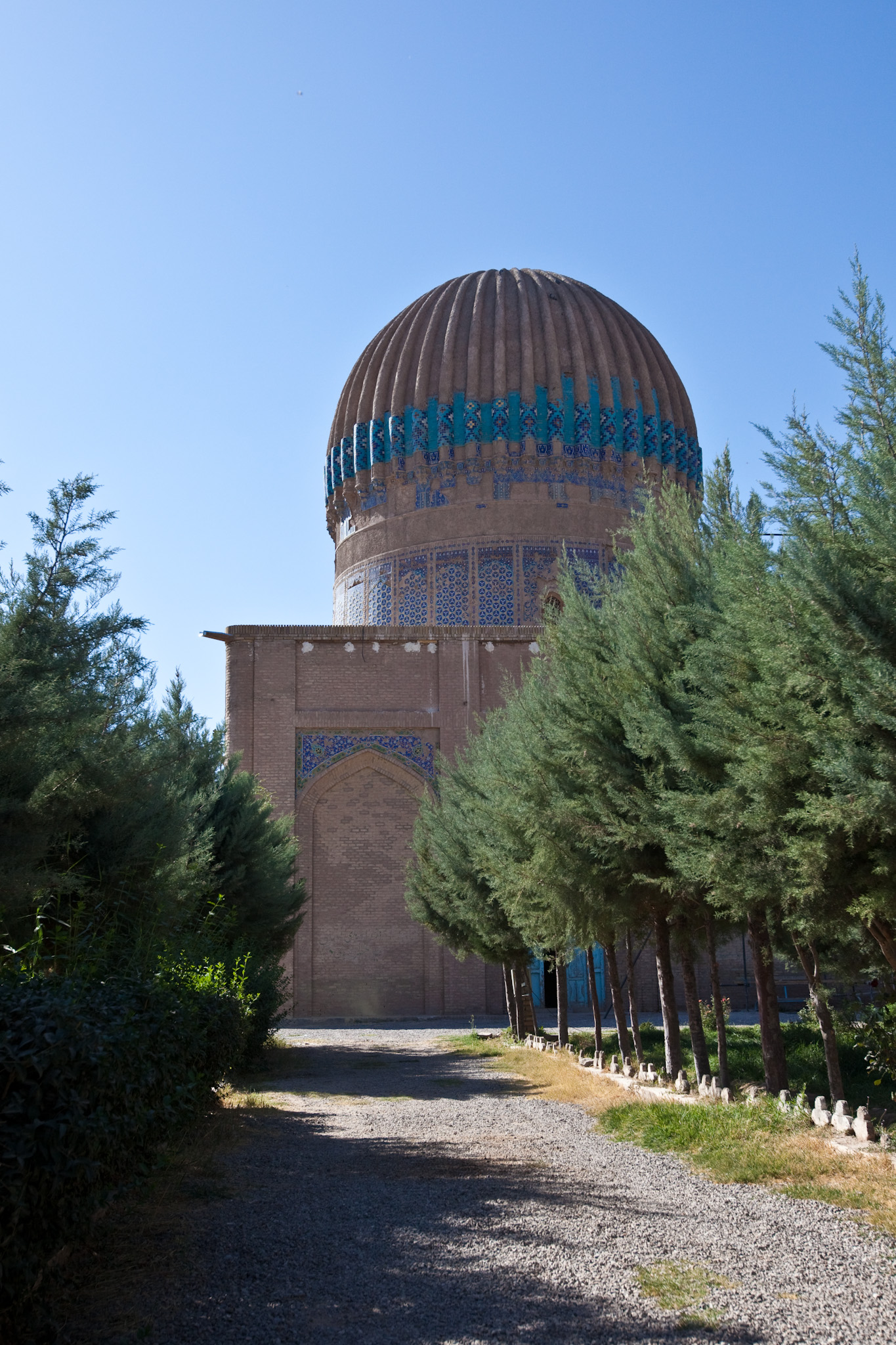
Mausoleum in 2009

Vegetable Stands near the ruins, 2009

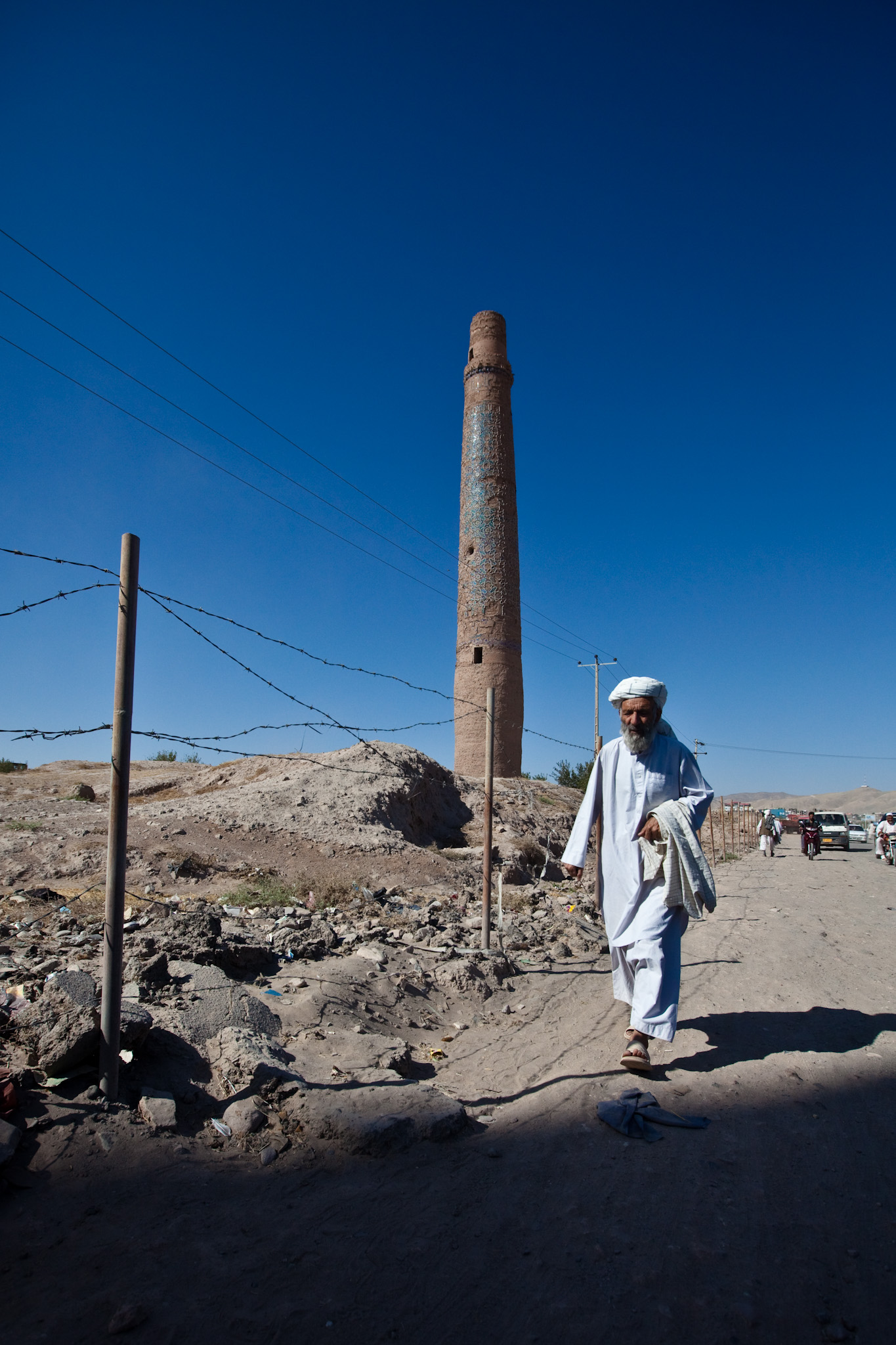
A minaret in 2009

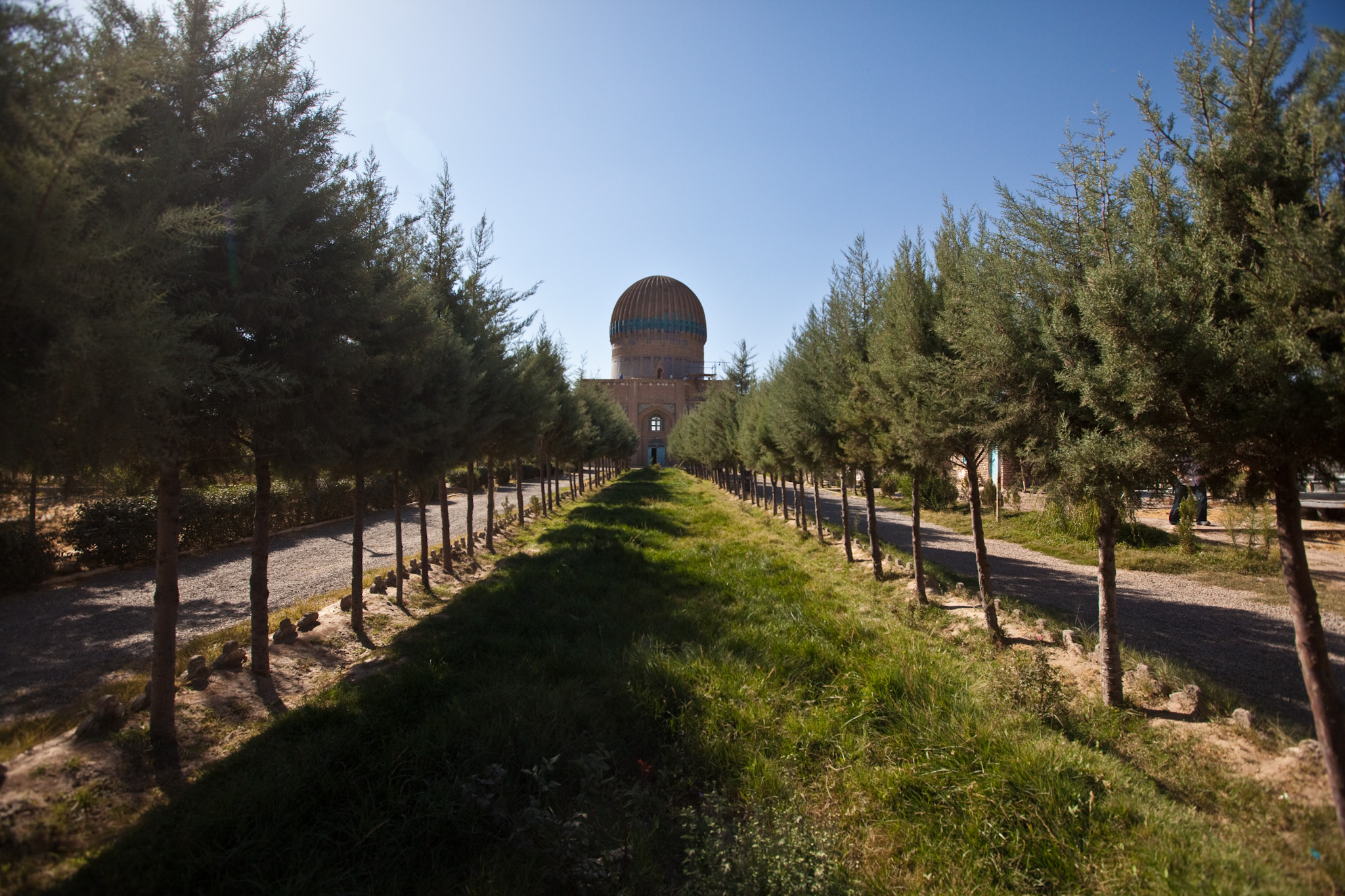
New replanted trees in complex garden, 2009

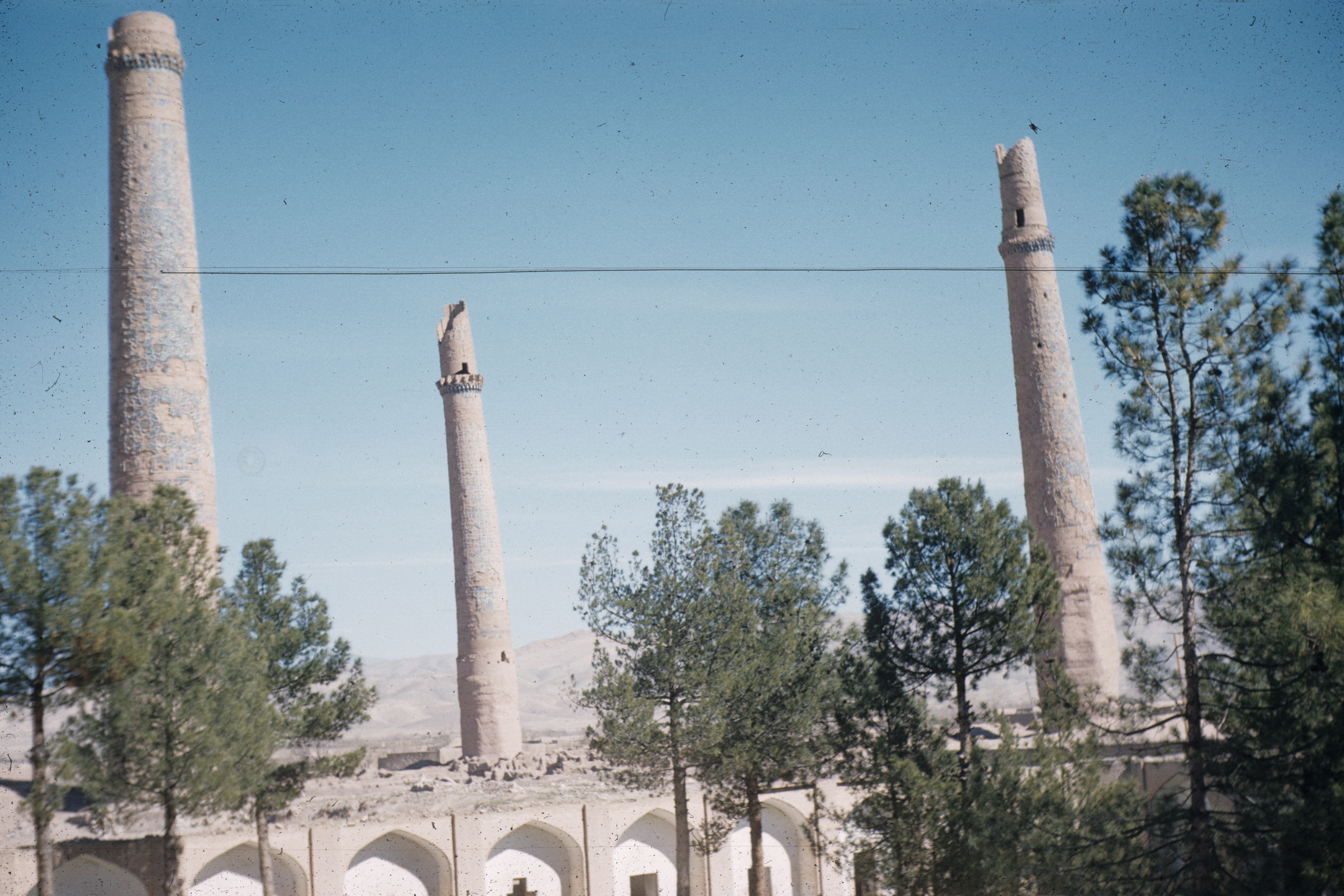
Musalla complex in 1962

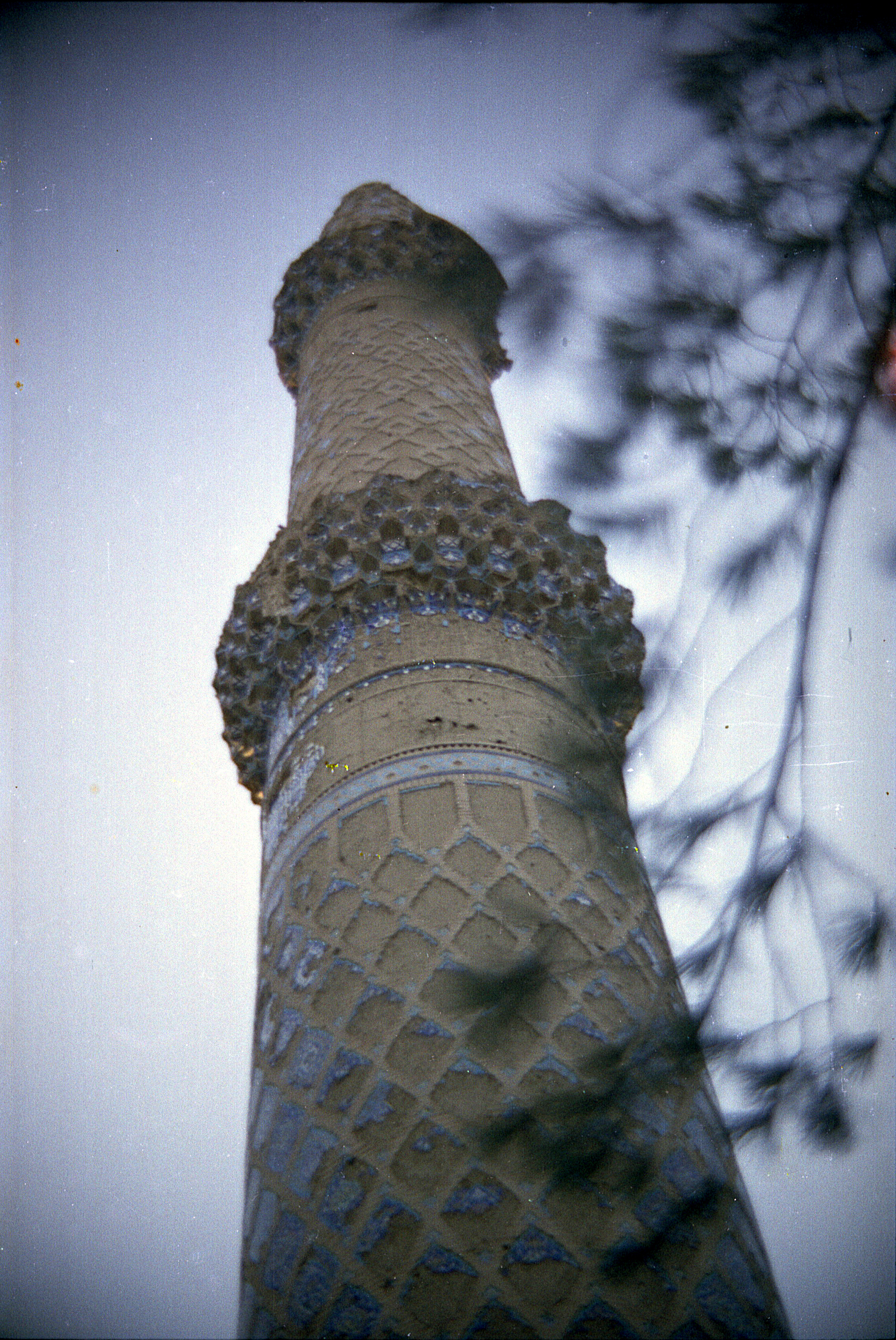
Minaret in 1969

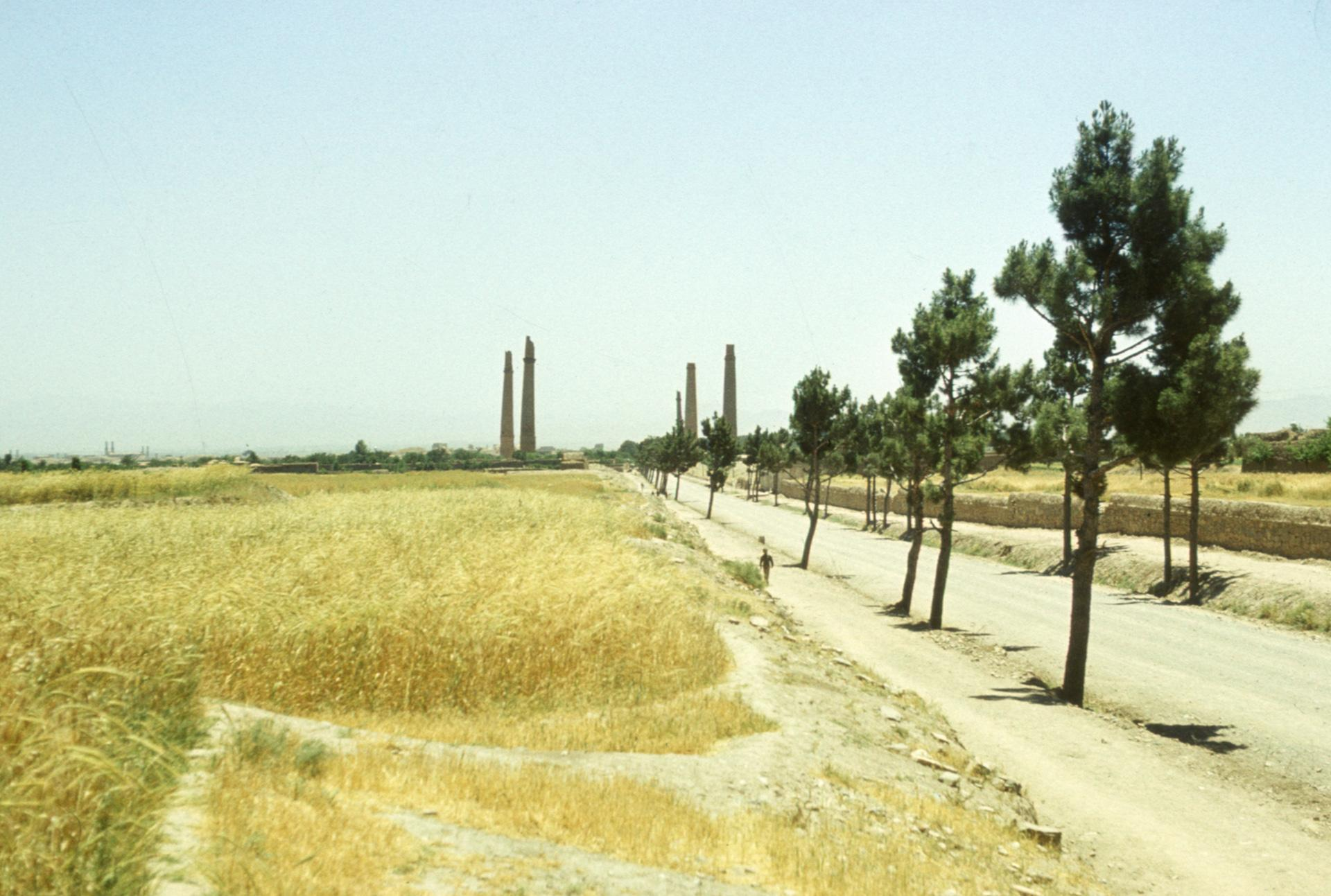
The site in 1975

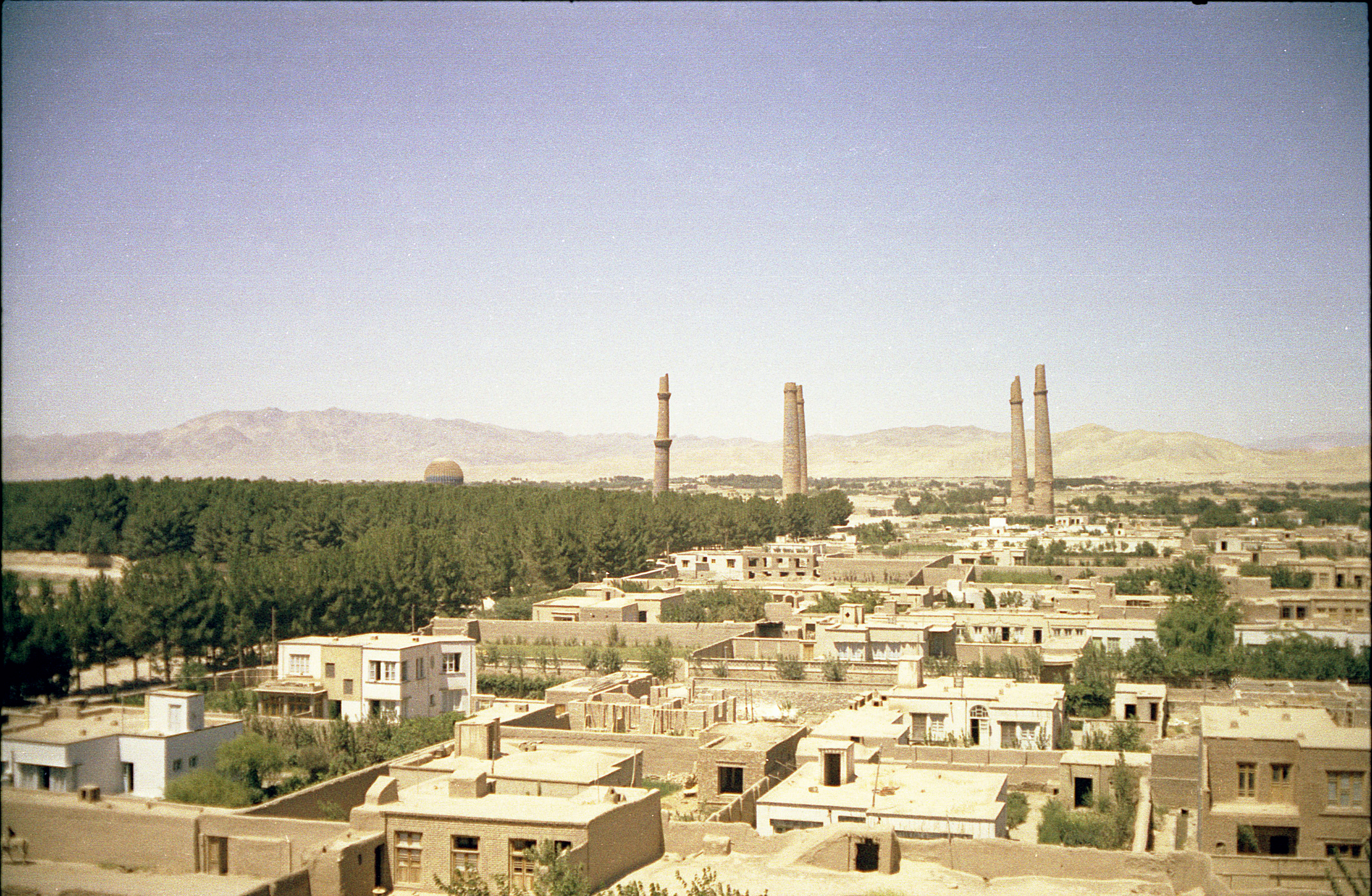
Herat skyline with Musallah minarets, 1969

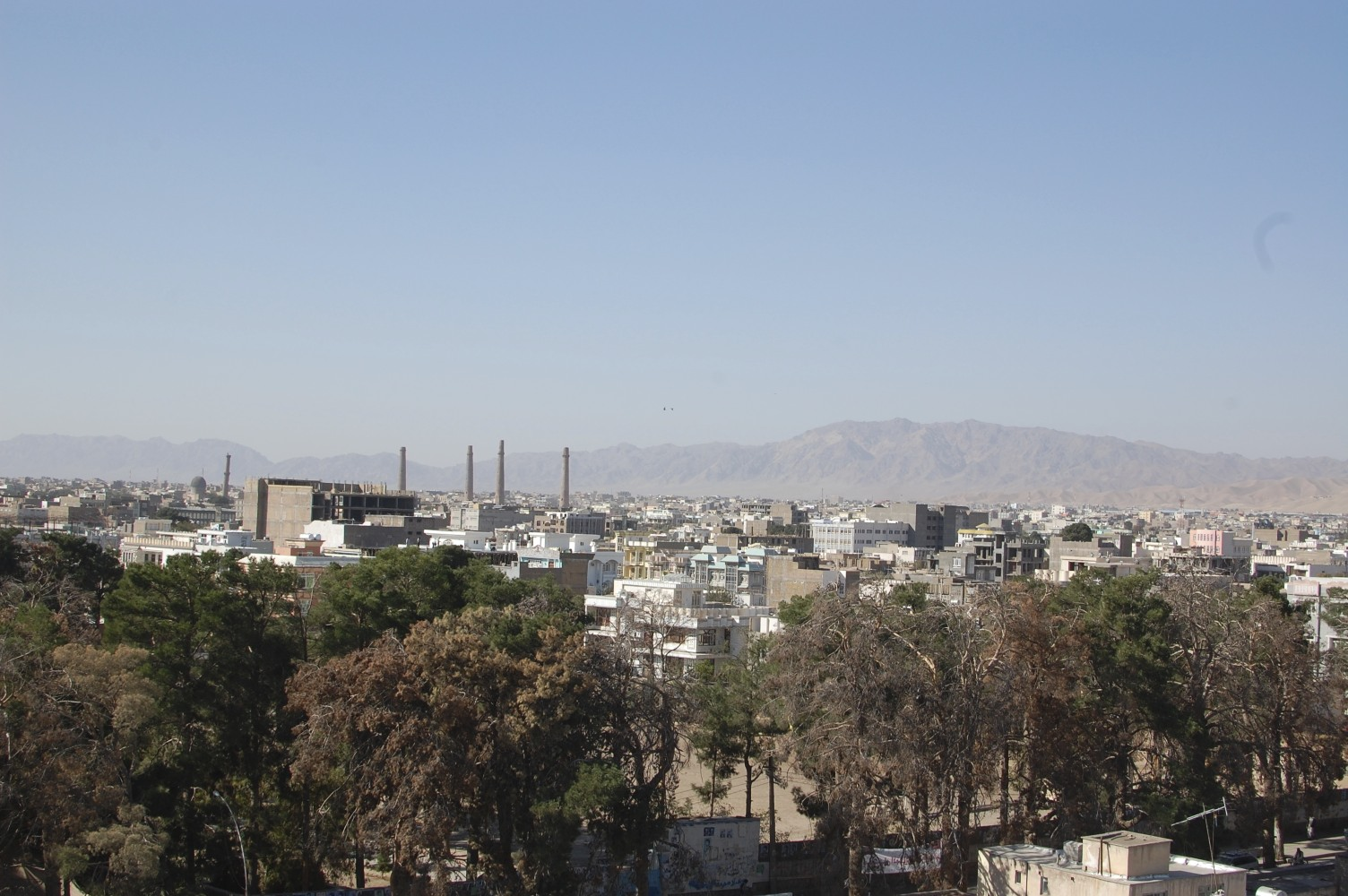
Herat skyline with Musallah minarets, 2009

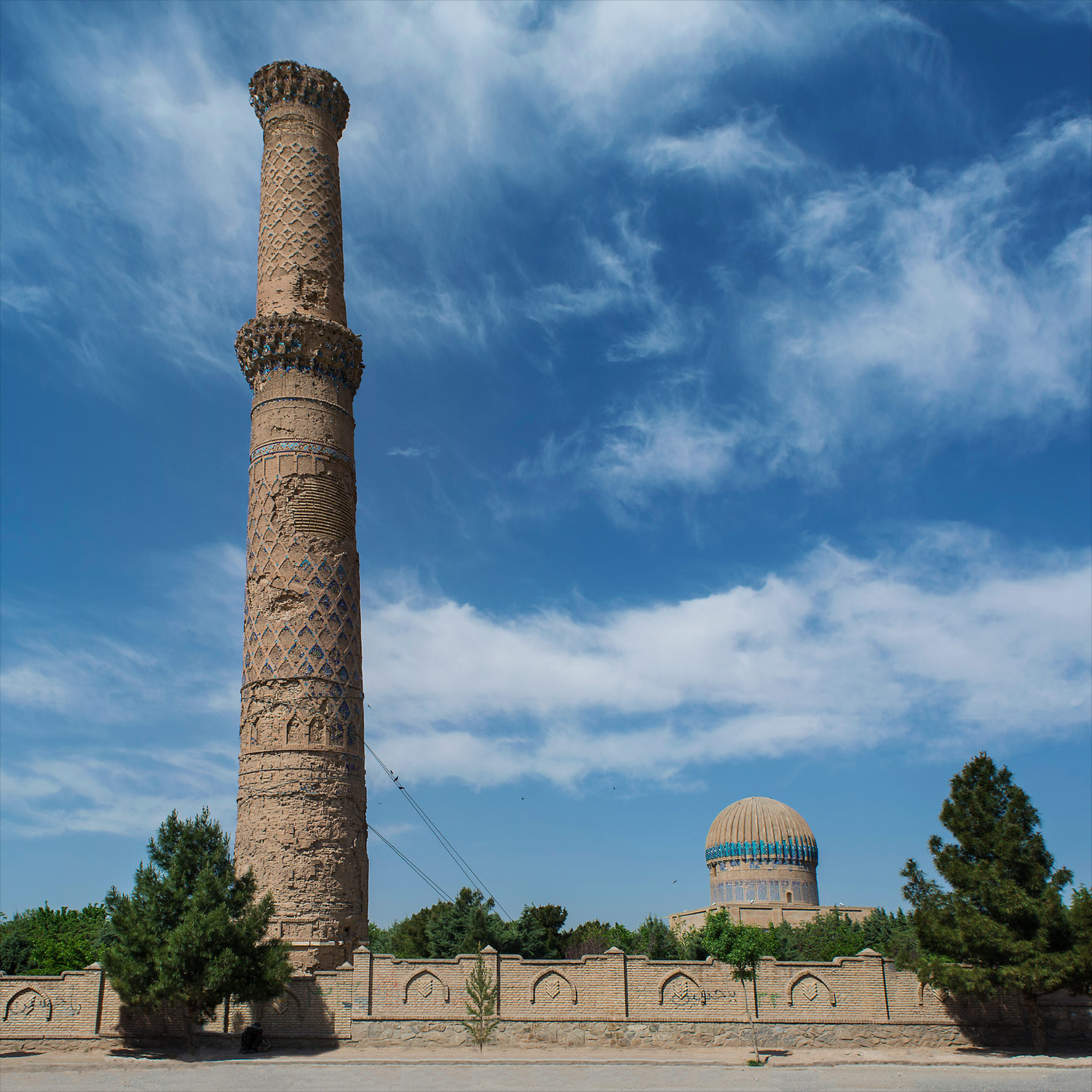
A panorama of the ruins

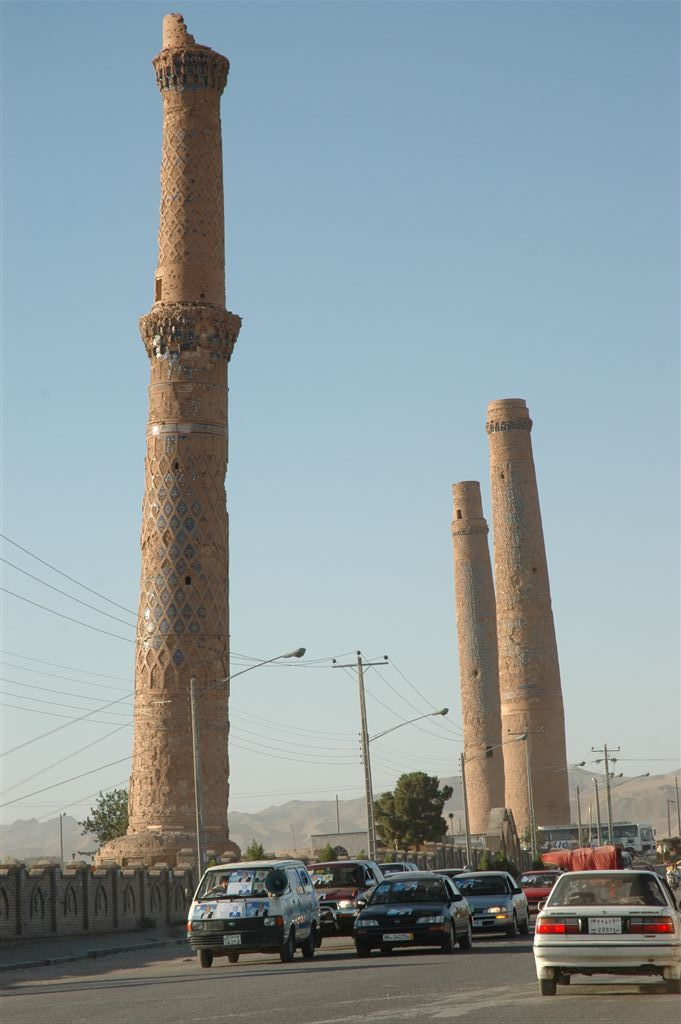
Traffic passing on road near the Herat minarets, 2005.

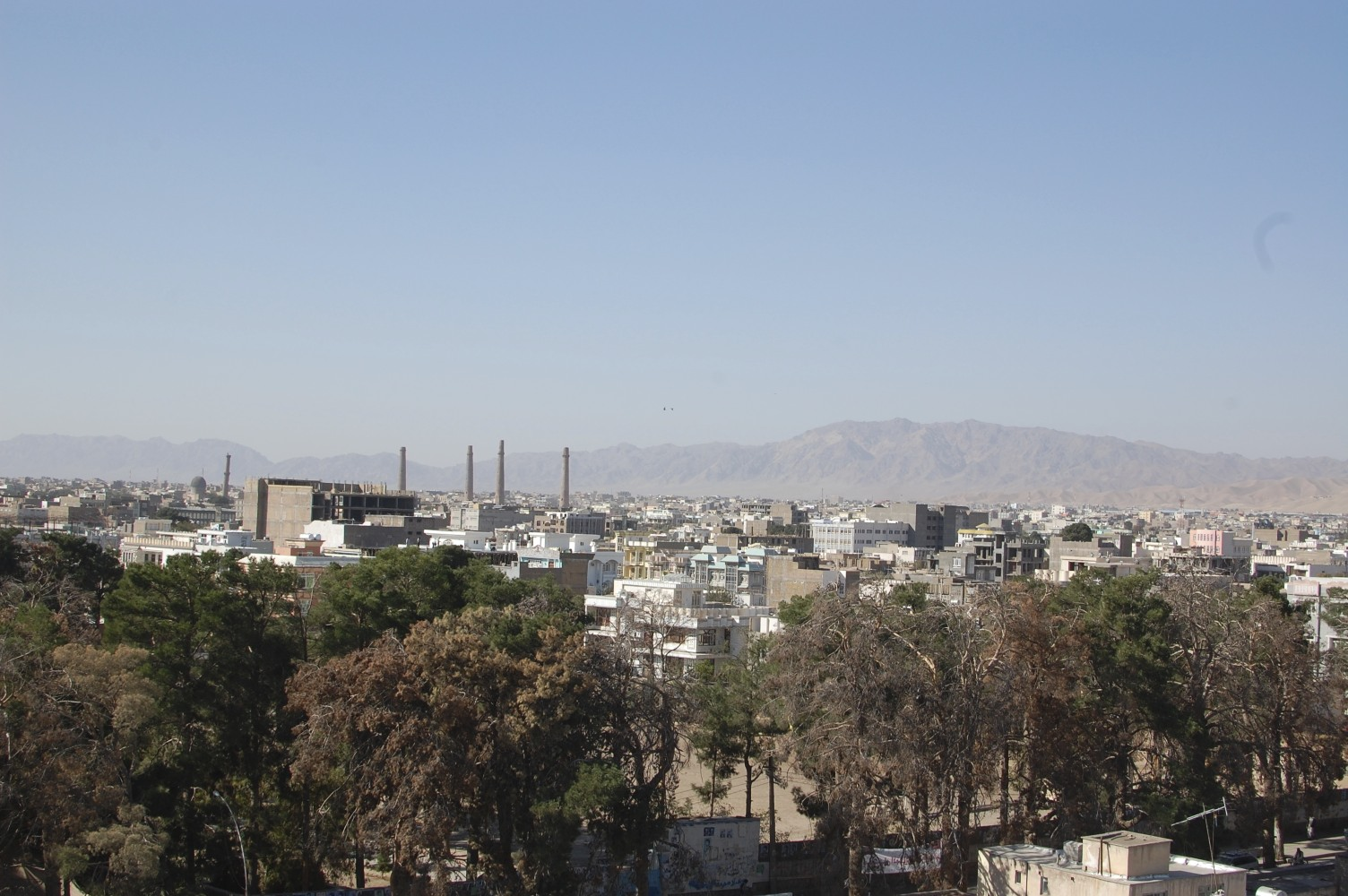
Herat skyline with Musallah minarets, 2009

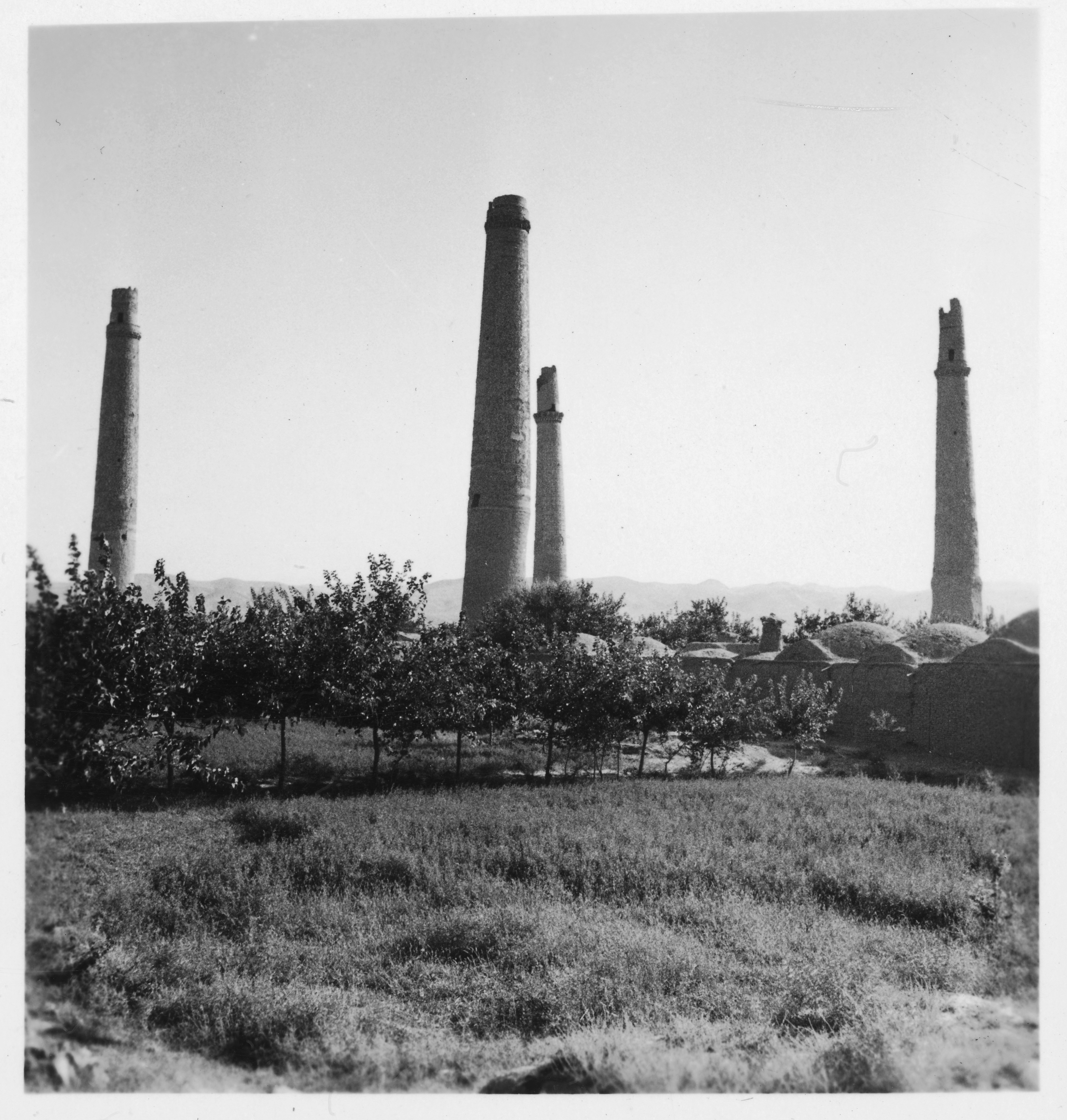
Minarets in 1939–1940.

== See also ==
- Gawhar Shad Mausoleum
- Ghazni Minarets
- Islam in Afghanistan
- Minaret of Jam
- Musalla Minarets of Herat
- Timurid Empire
