= Opus sectile =

Traditional mosaic technique

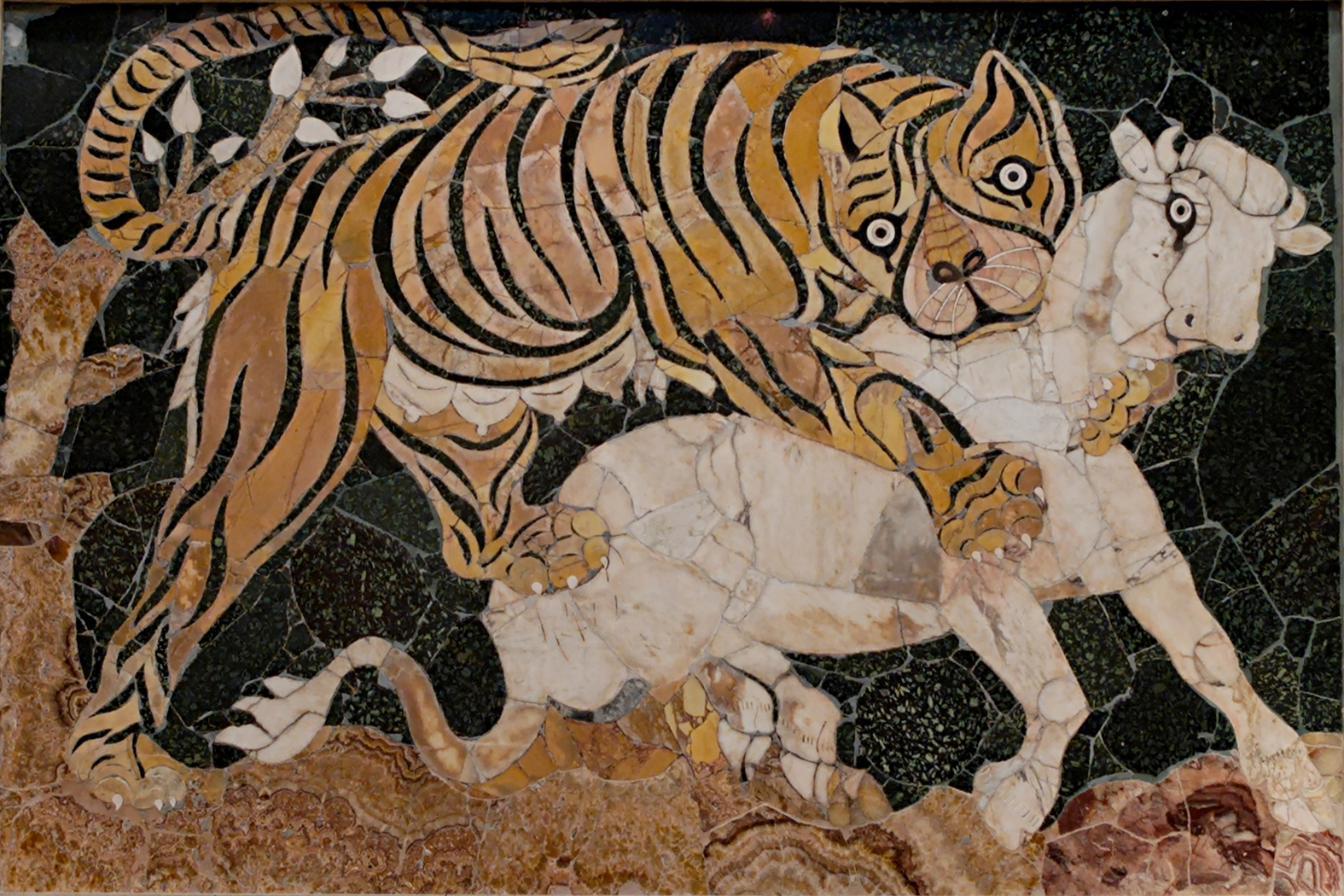
Tigress attacking a calf, marble opus sectile (325–350 AD) from the Basilica of Junius Bassus on the Esquiline Hill, Rome

Opus sectile is a form of pietra dura popularized in the ancient and medieval Roman world where materials were cut and inlaid into walls and floors to create motifs or patterns. Common materials were marble, mother of pearl, and glass. The materials were cut in thin pieces, polished, then trimmed further according to a chosen pattern. Unlike tessellated mosaic techniques, where the placement of very small uniformly sized pieces forms a picture, opus sectile pieces are much larger and can be shaped to define large parts of the design.

The term opus sectile was introduced in recent centuries, but the Romans used the term sectilia pavimenta.

== Origin and evolution ==
=== Early examples ===
It appeared in Rome in the first decades of the 1st c. BC when "stone slab floors came into use, at least in the smaller element type". Under Augustus, its use in the flooring of public buildings began. The success of the first experiments on a monumental scale led to its application in the private sector, where decorative schemes with smaller marble sections were perfected, but which were very expensive due to the more complex execution. Hence these first examples are limited to imperial properties, such as the villa of Livia at Prima Porta and those of Tiberius on Capri.

Recent work by the Temple Mount Sifting Project has recovered enough pieces of polished stone triangles and squares from the Herodian Temple Mount in Jerusalem to reconstruct geometric patterns of opus sectile flooring. Evidence for geometric opus sectile floors also comes from Herodian palaces at Cypros, Caesarea Maritima, Herodium, Jericho, Machaerus, Masada, and from Herodian construction at Banias, where the opus sectile consisted of octagons, squares, and triangles.

=== Golden era: Rome and Eastern Empire ===
The most prominent artefacts remain from 4th-century Rome. A large set from the Basilica of Junius Bassus survived, depicting an elaborate chariot and other images. The popularity of opus sectile decoration continued in Rome through the 6th century, and affected areas as far as Constantinople (now Istanbul in Turkey). Particularly remarkable are a series of fourth-century CE panels in glass opus sectile, found in a possible sanctuary of Isis at the eastern Corinthian port of Kenchreai, in excavations carried out in the 1960s; they include scenes of famous authors like Homer and Plato, scenes of Nilotic landscapes, harbour-front cities and geometric panels.

==== Examples ====
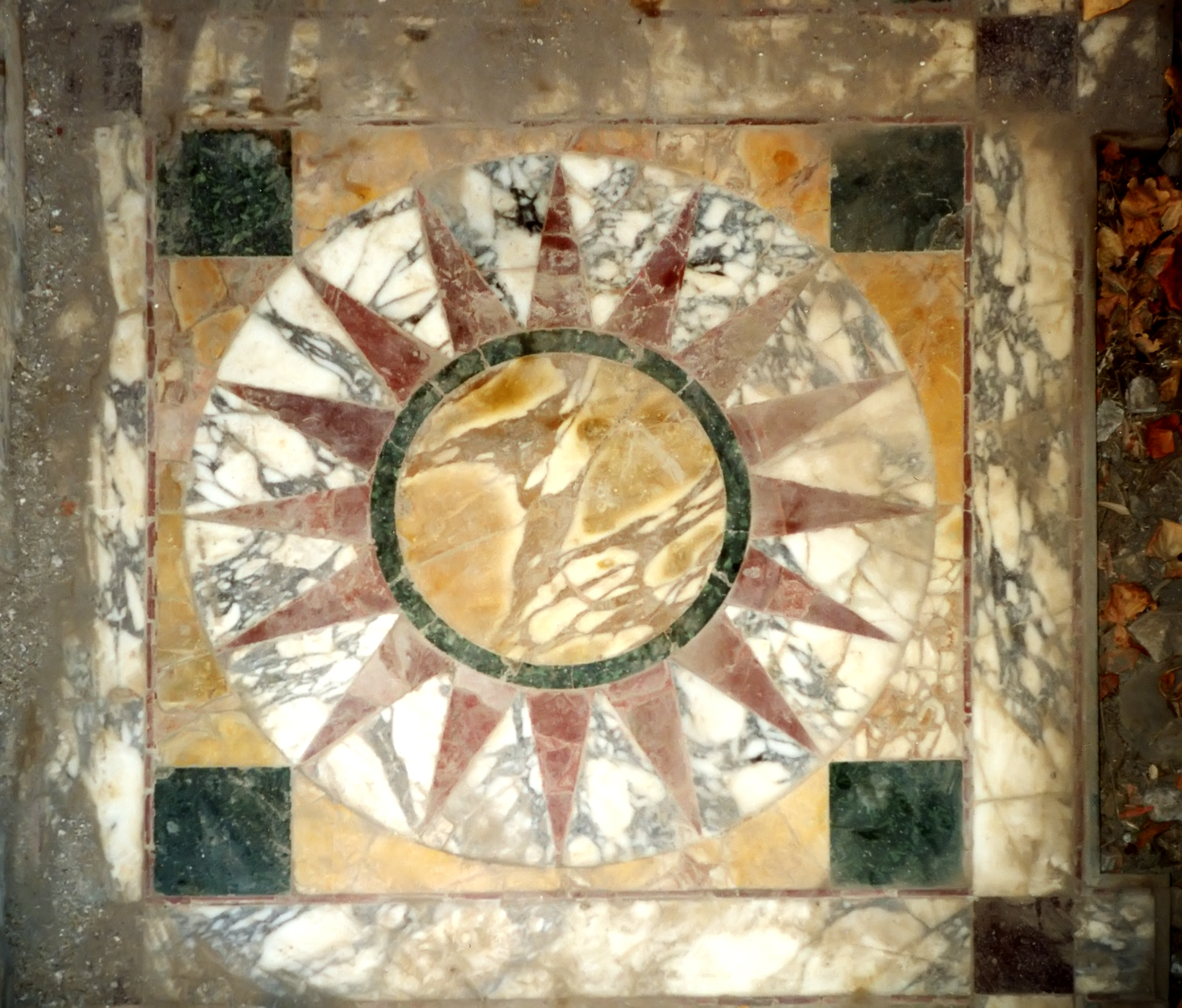
Marble floor inlay, Hadrian's Villa (early 2nd century)

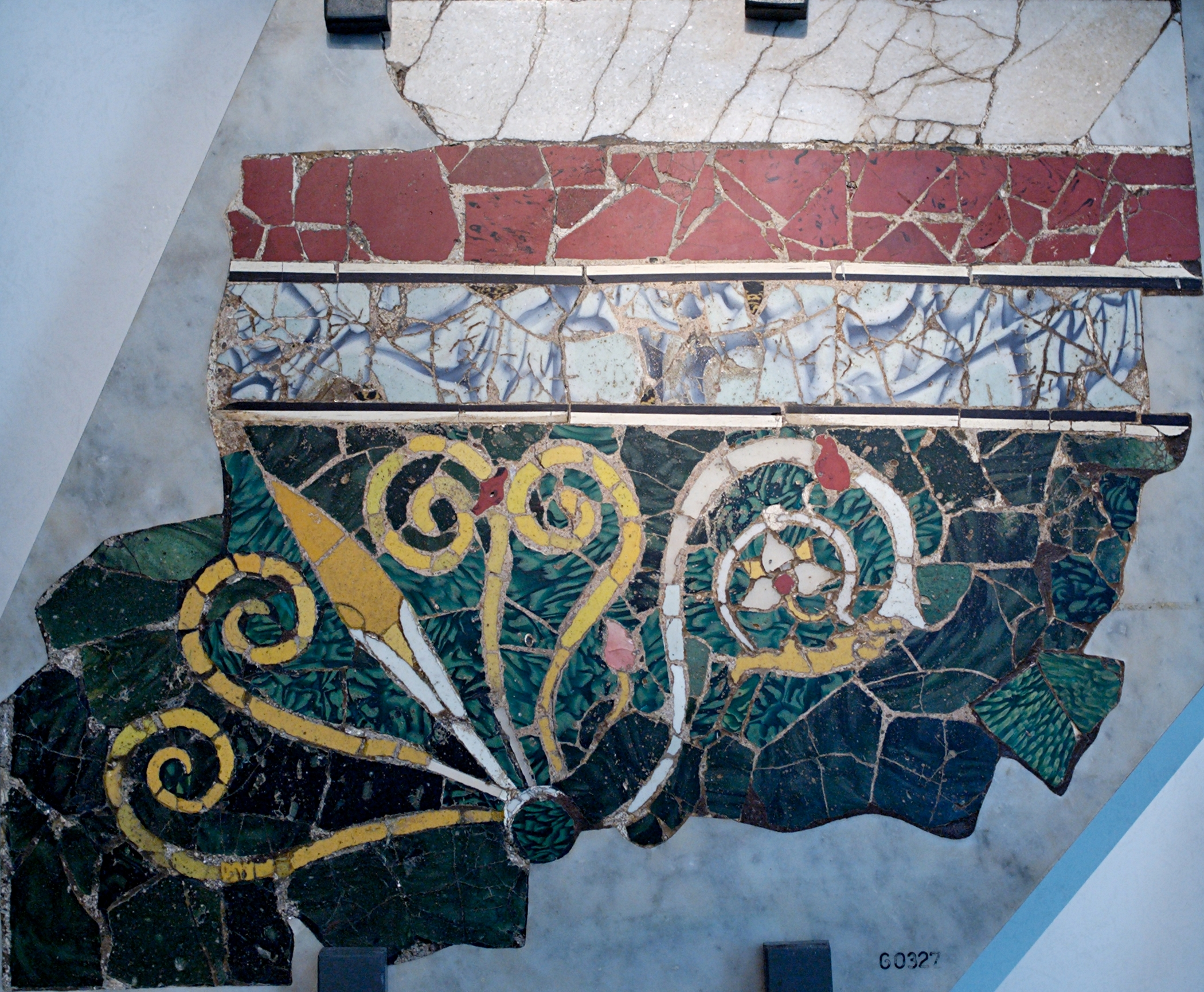
Vegetal pattern. Roman artwork, 2nd century AD, possibly from the villa of Lucius Verus in Acquatraversa. On exhibit at the Palazzo Massimi alle Terme.

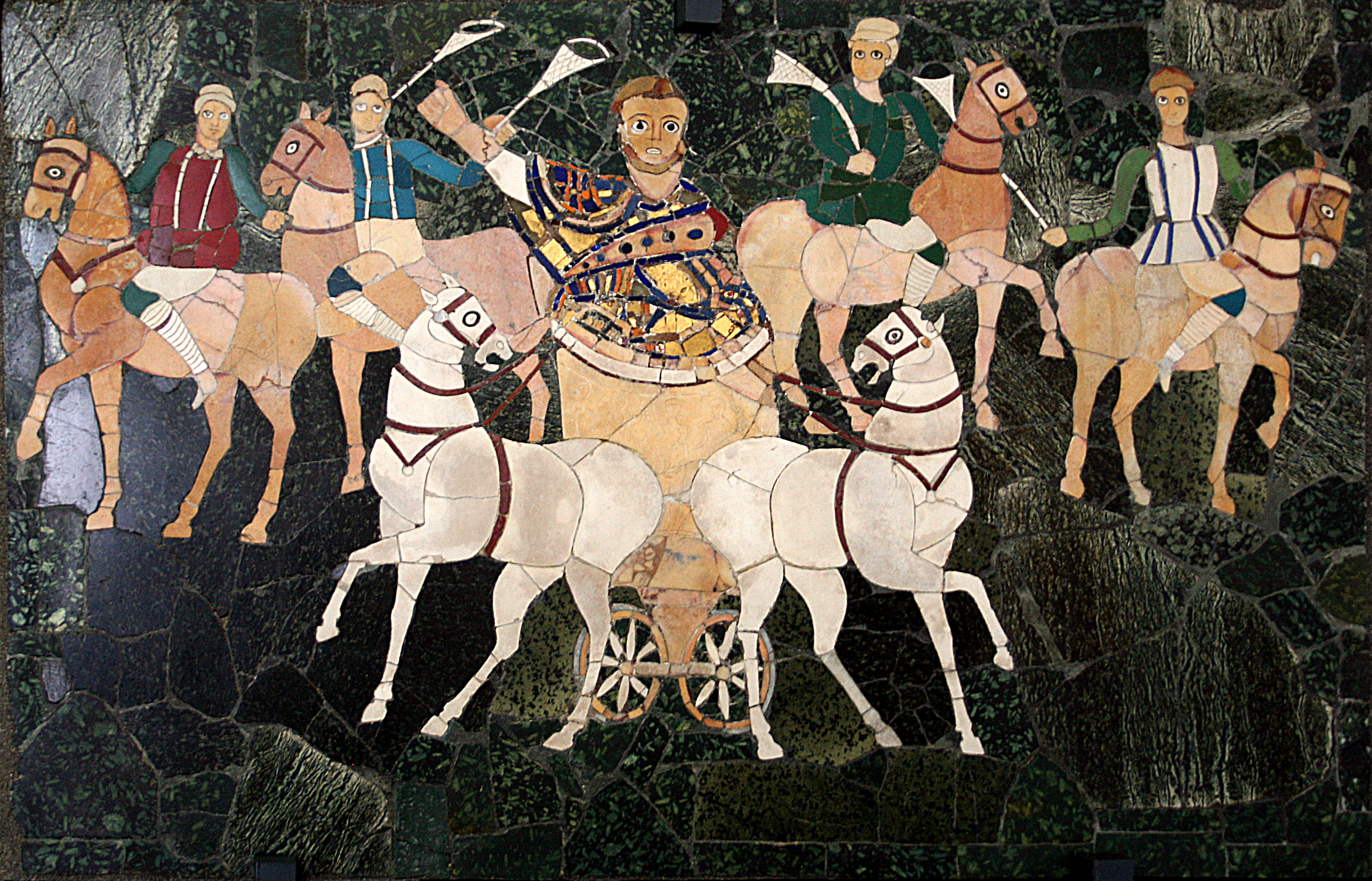
Two-horse chariot bearing the presiding magistrate at a pompa circensis ("circus parade"), from the Basilica of Junius Bassus

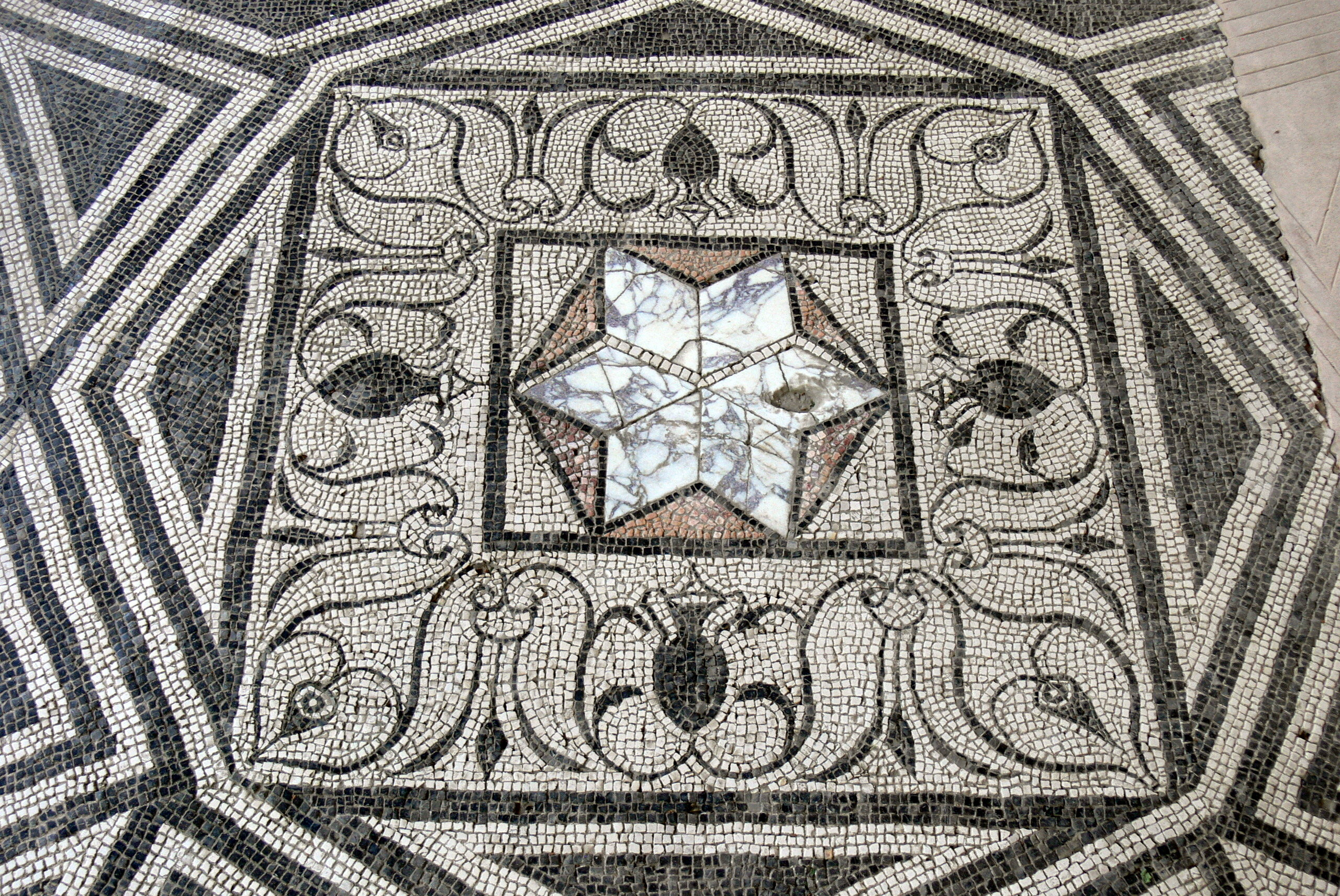
Ancient Roman star-shaped opus sectile inset within a tessellated (i.e. mosaic) pavement (Archaeological Museum, Aquileia)

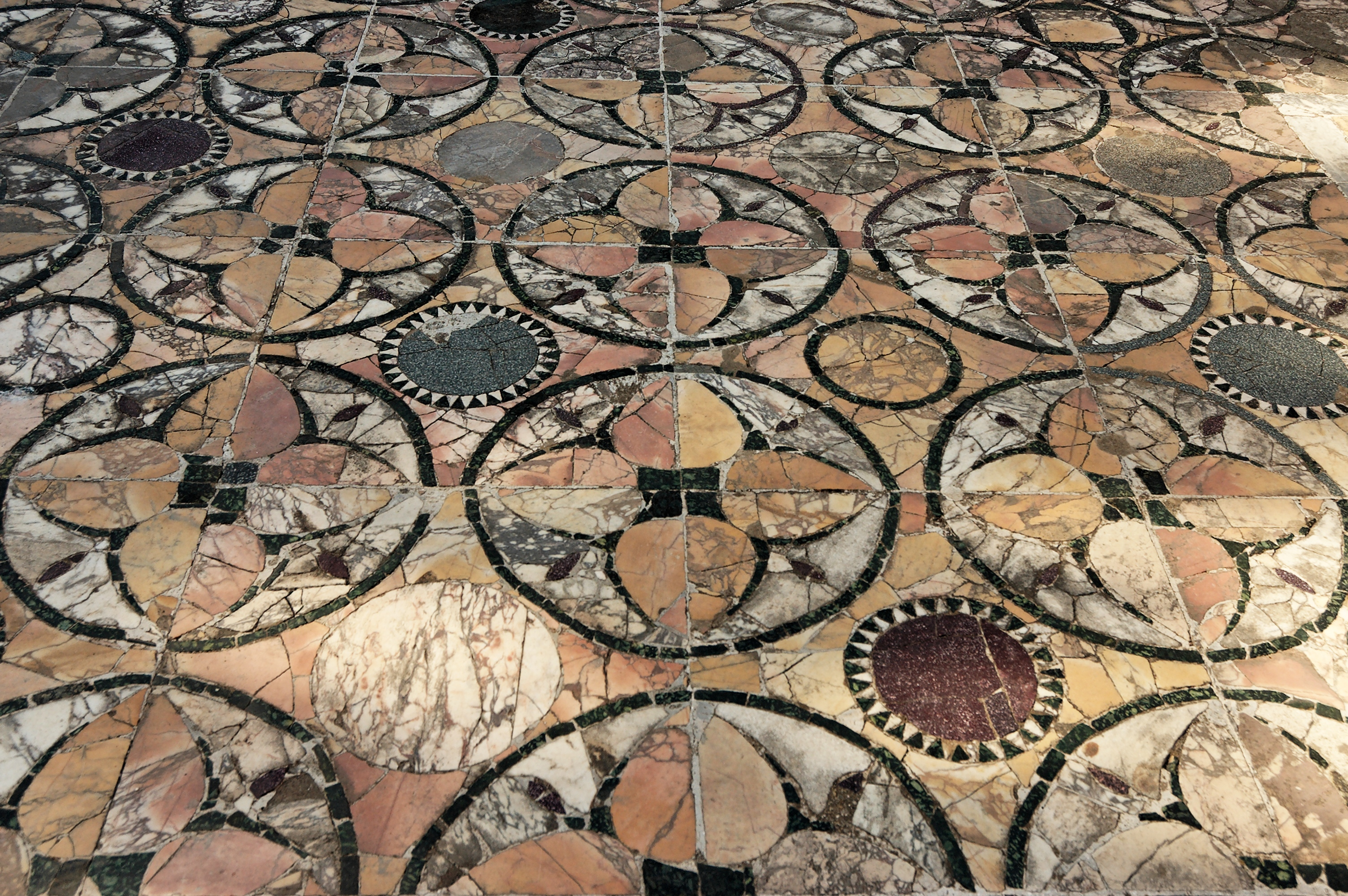
Opus sectile floor pavement. Room C of the House of Cupid and Psyche (regio I, insula XIV), Ostia Antica

=== Later uses ===
==== Byzantine Empire ====
Although the technique died in Rome with the decline of the Empire, it continued to be used prominently in Byzantine churches, primarily in floor designs.

==== Persia ====
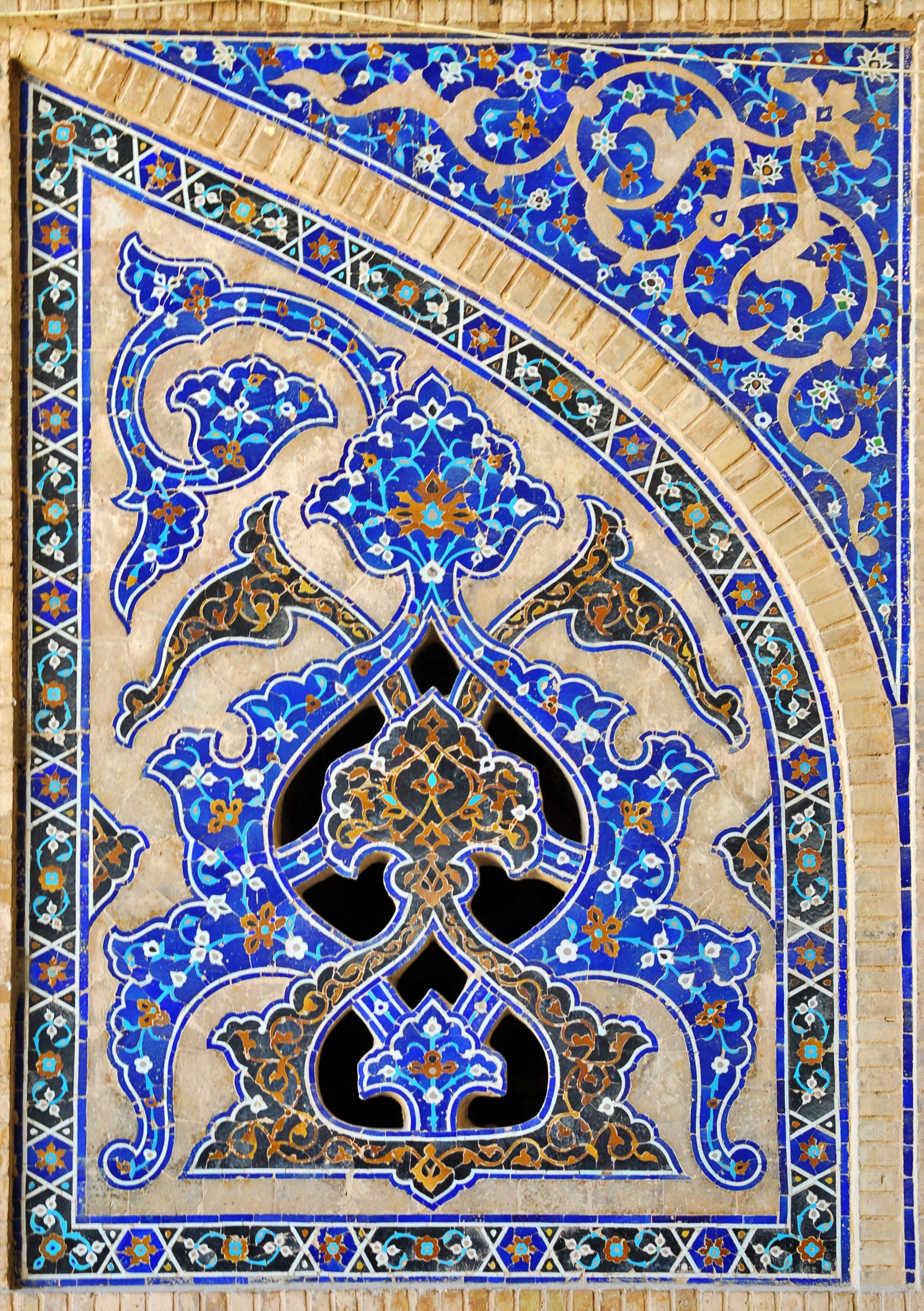
Mo'araq, Aq Qoyunlu tilework at the South iwan of the Jameh Mosque of Isfahan, circa 1475-76

The technique, known as Mo'araq in Persian, was used extensively by the Timurids, Qara Qoyunlu and Aq Qoyunlu dynasties in the 14th-15th century.

==== Medieval Italy ====
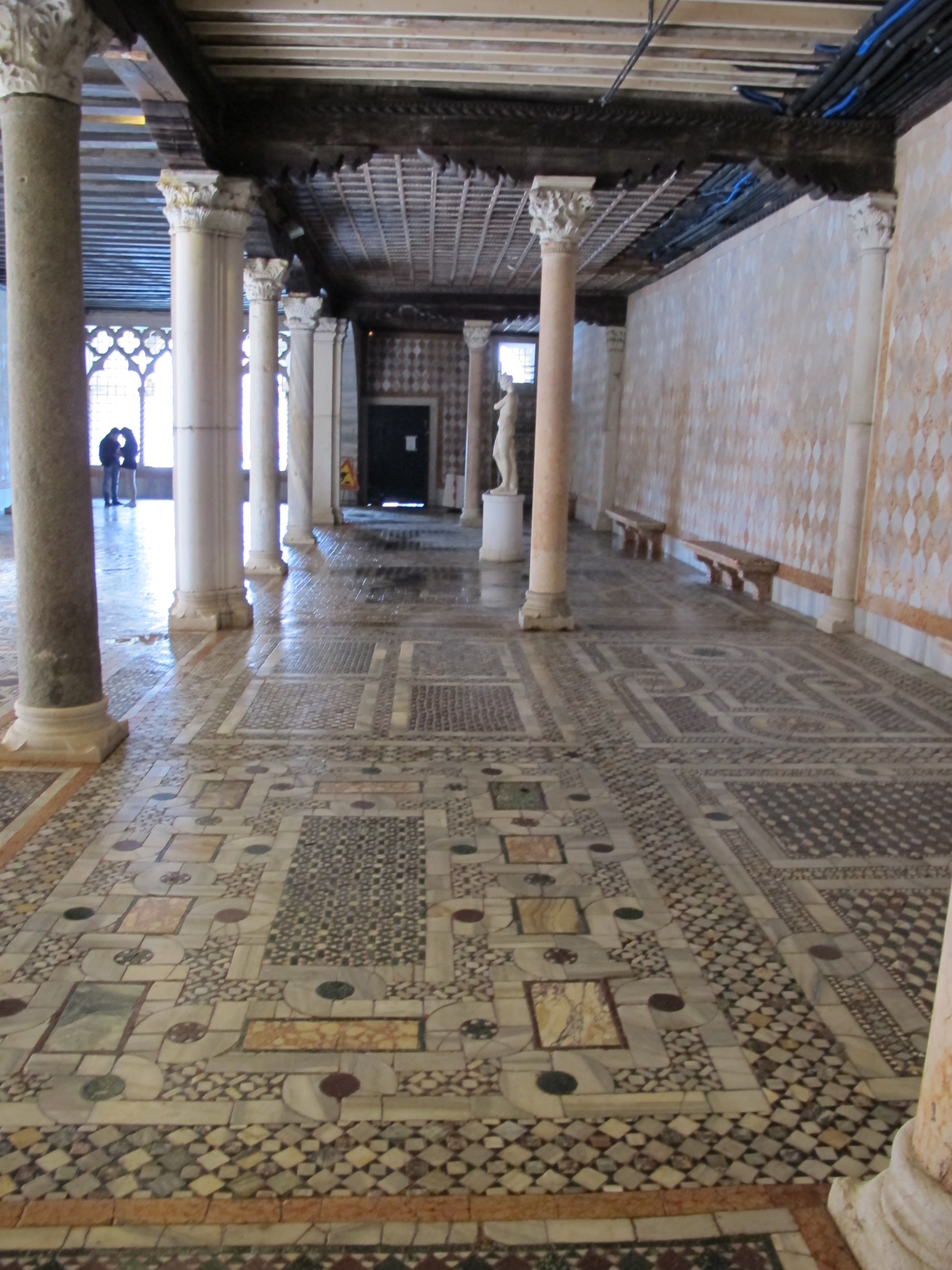
Cosmatesque pavement, Ca' d'Oro, Venice

From Byzantium it was eventually brought back to Sicily and the Italian mainland, in the 12th century as the Cosmatesque style, concentrating on geometric patterns.

It is featured at the basilica San Miniato al Monte that overlooks Florence.

==== Italian Renaissance ====
There was a major revival from the Italian Renaissance (14th–17th century) in the form of pietra dura work, although this normally consists of much smaller compositions and it was mainly used on furniture.

==== Intarsia ====
Architectural work from later periods tends to be called intarsia.

==== 19th-century England ====
In England, the technique was revived in the late 19th century by artists working in the Arts and Crafts movement. Charles Hardgrave, whose designs were executed by James Powell & Sons at the Whitefriars Glass Works, was a noted designer in this technique.

== See also ==
- Intarsia
- Marquetry
- Pietra dura
- Roman masonry – building techniques in ancient Rome
- Roman concrete, also known as opus caementicium – Building material used in ancient Rome

== General and cited references ==
- Avraham, A.: 'Addressing the Issue of Temple Mount Pavements During the Herodian Period'. New Studies on Jerusalem, Vol 13, Ramat-Gan, Israel. 2007.
- Becatti, G. Edificio con opus sectile fuori Porta Marina. Roma: Istituto Poligrafico dello Stato, 1969.
- The Stations of the Cross according to St. Alphonsus; reproduced from the original "opus sectile" panels in the Church of St Mary's, Lowe House, St Helens, Lancs. London: Burns Oates, 1934.
- De Fazio, A & Schöps, A.: Un lacerto in 'opus sectile' dalla 'domus' di via D'Azeglio a Ravenna: proposte di restauro e conservazione. Ravenna: Longo, 1995.
- Ibrahim, L., Scranton, R. & Brill, R. Kenchreai, Eastern port of Corinth ... 2, The panels of opus sectile in glass. Leiden: Brill, 1976.
- Mosaici antichi in Italia: Sectilia pavimenta di Villa Adriana. Rome: Istituto poligrafico e Zecca dello Stato, Libreria dello Stato, 1989.
- James, Liz. "Opus sectile". Grove Art Online. Oxford University Press.
- Snyder, F. & Avraham. A.: "The Opus Sectile Floor in Caldarium of the Palatial Fortress at Cypros". In: Hasmonean and Herodian Palaces at Jericho, Volume V. The Hebrew University of Jerusalem, pp 175–202. 2013.
