= Mo'araq =

Type of Iranian tilework

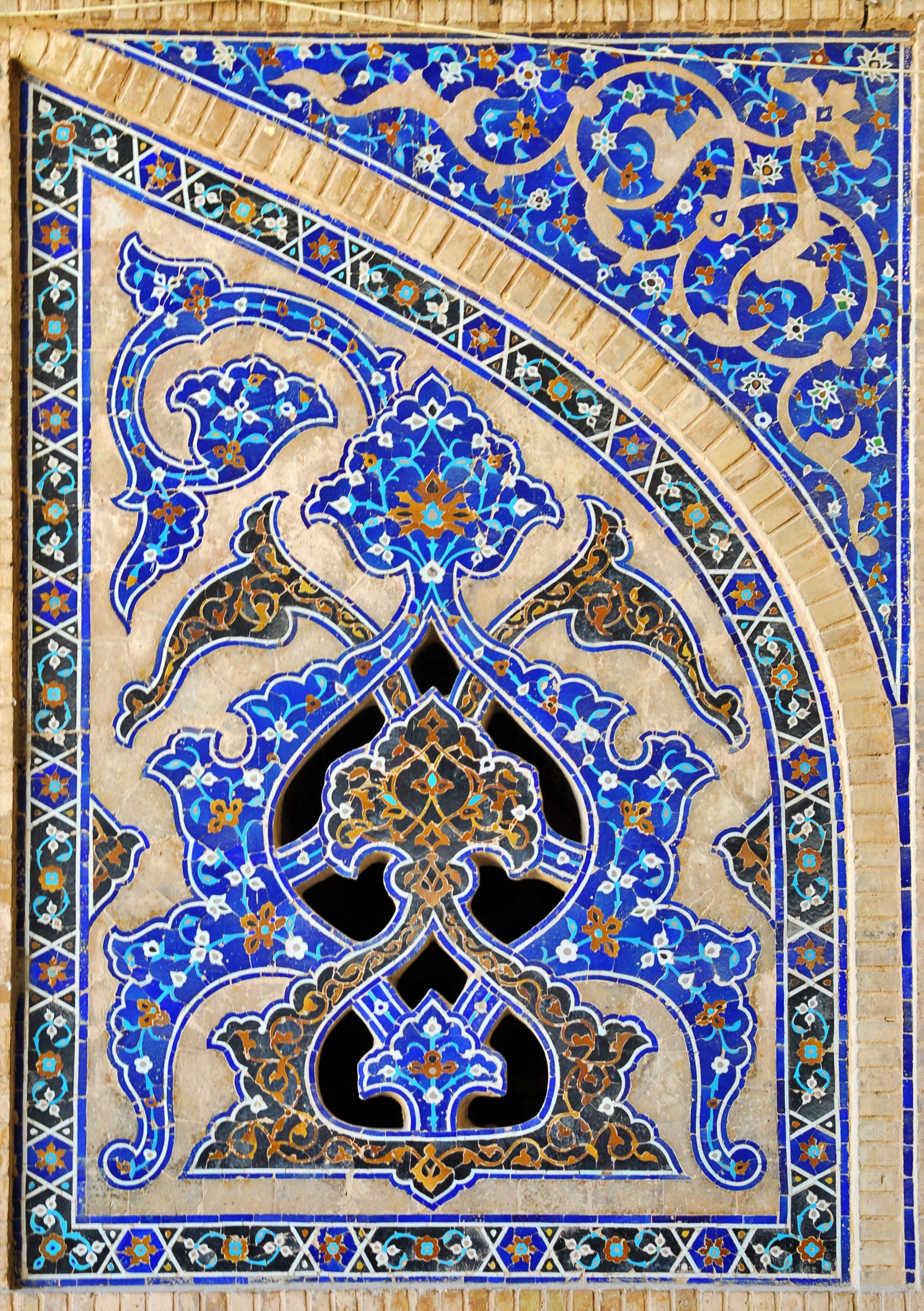
Mo'araq, Aq Qoyunlu tilework at the South iwan of the Jameh Mosque of Isfahan, circa 1475/76

Mo'araq (Persian: معرق, lit. 'inlay') is the Persian term for "cut-tile mosaic" techniques. It is part of the Classical opus sectile ("cut-stone mosaic") technique. It consists in using small shards of glazed colored tile, chipped and assembled precisely together in order to form a given design. This technique allows for long-lasting designs with vibrant colours, and is the oldest mosaic technique used in West Asia. In case of the specific use of ceramics, the term kǎši-ye mo'araq can be used.

== Early examples ==
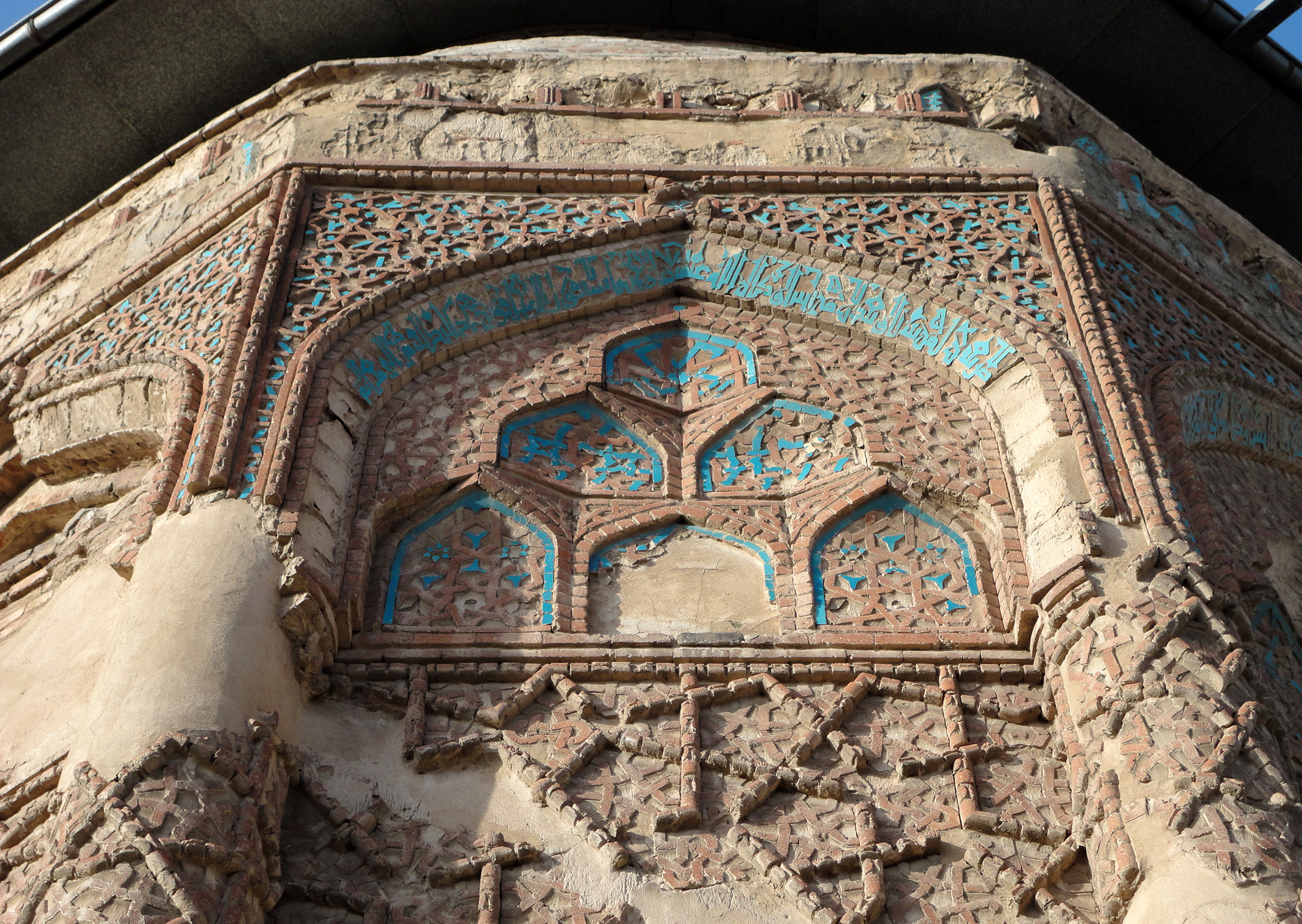
Combination of brickwork and tile decoration on the Seljuk era Gonbad-e Kabud Tomb in Maragheh (1196/97).

Fine decorative work with pre-formed (not "cut") monochrome tiles appears quite early with the Seljuk Kharraqan Towers (1067–1093). The evolution of the Mo'araq may have been progressive, as craftsmen increasingly used pieces of enameled cut tiles inserted into wall surfaces for decorative purposes.

The exact origin of pure Mo'araq is uncertain. One of the candidates for the earliest form of complete inlaid cut-tilework (with no intervening space between the tile fragments) is from the Seljuk era, with the 13th century Gök Medrese (1269/70) in Tokat, Anatolia under the Sultanate of Rum. The technique was apparently applied in the Gök Medrese by craftsmen who had emigrated from Iran.

In Iran itself, the first known example of complete cut-tile mosaics is the Dome of Soltaniyeh (1307–1313) during the Ilkhanid era, where the mosaic appear "in situ". Some possible fragments of cut-tile mosaic may also have been found in two slightly earlier monuments: the tomb of Ghazan Khan (Ghazan Khan died in 1304) in Tabriz, and the buildings of the Rab'-i Rashīdī (before 1318).

== Maturity ==
The technique matured during the 15th century, and was practiced by the Timurids in Samarkand and Herat, as well as the Turkmen polities of the Qara Qoyunlu and Aq Qoyunlu in Western and Central Iran. Mo'araq continued to be in use during the Safavid era (16th–17th century), especially in Isfahan under Abbas the Great.

The term Mo'araq can also be used for marquetry, in which small pieces of woods of various nature and shade can be used to achieve a design.

Mo'araq is technically very different from Haft-rang (7-color) tiles, which started to be used widely in the 17th century. The Haft-Rang technique is simpler and faster, but only uses large square tiles on which colors are painted side-by-side or delineated with black painting, and the whole tile is then fired, which does not permit an optimum firing process for each of the colors. Hence the colours of Haft-Rang are weaker, less intense, less clearly delineated, and the glazes not as strong.

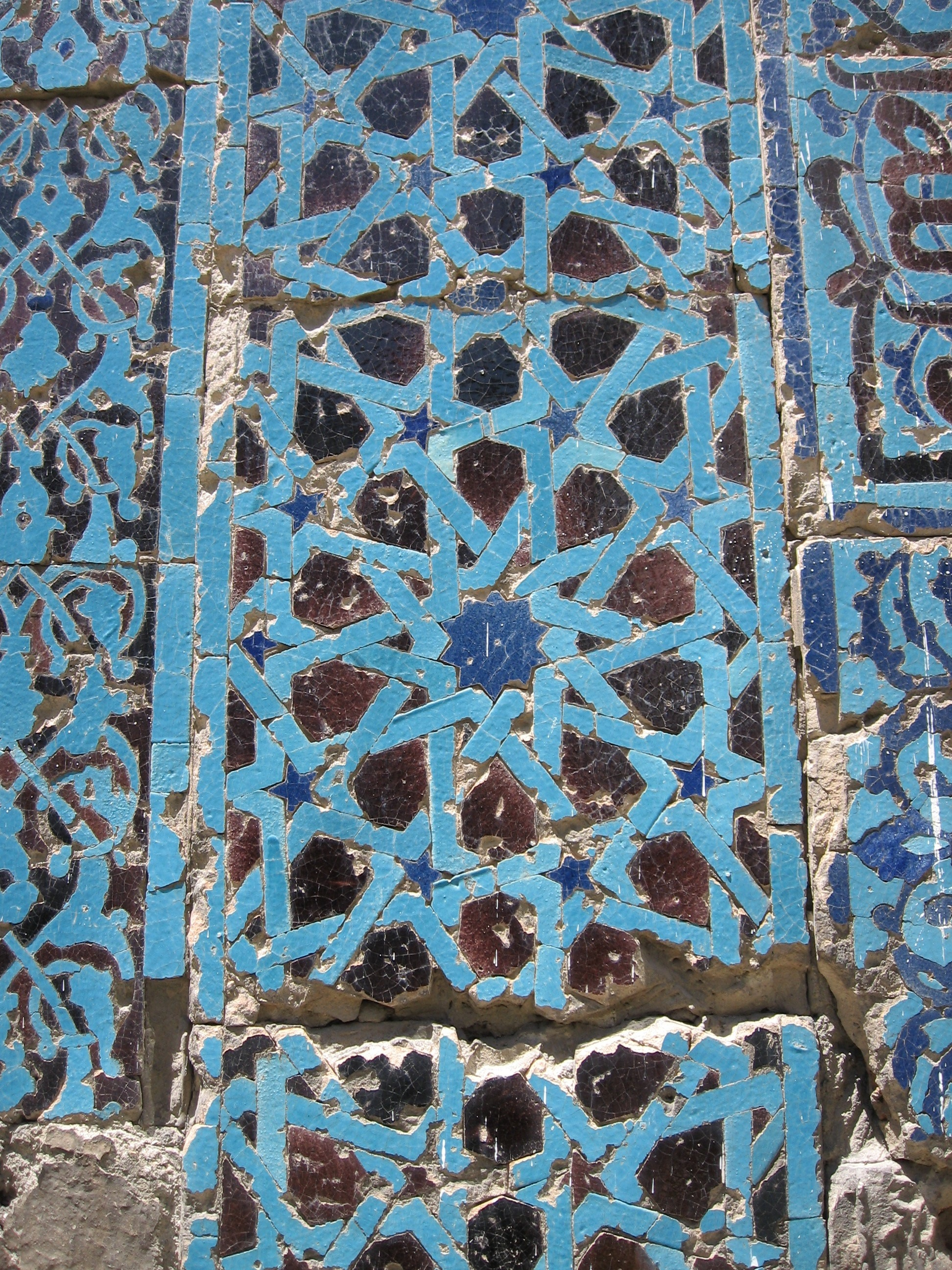
Seljuk tile mosaic, Gök Medrese, Tokat, 1269/70

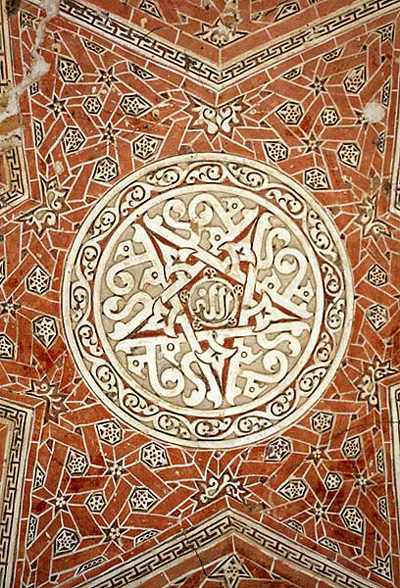
Ilkhanate tile mosaic, Dome of Soltaniyeh (1307–1313)

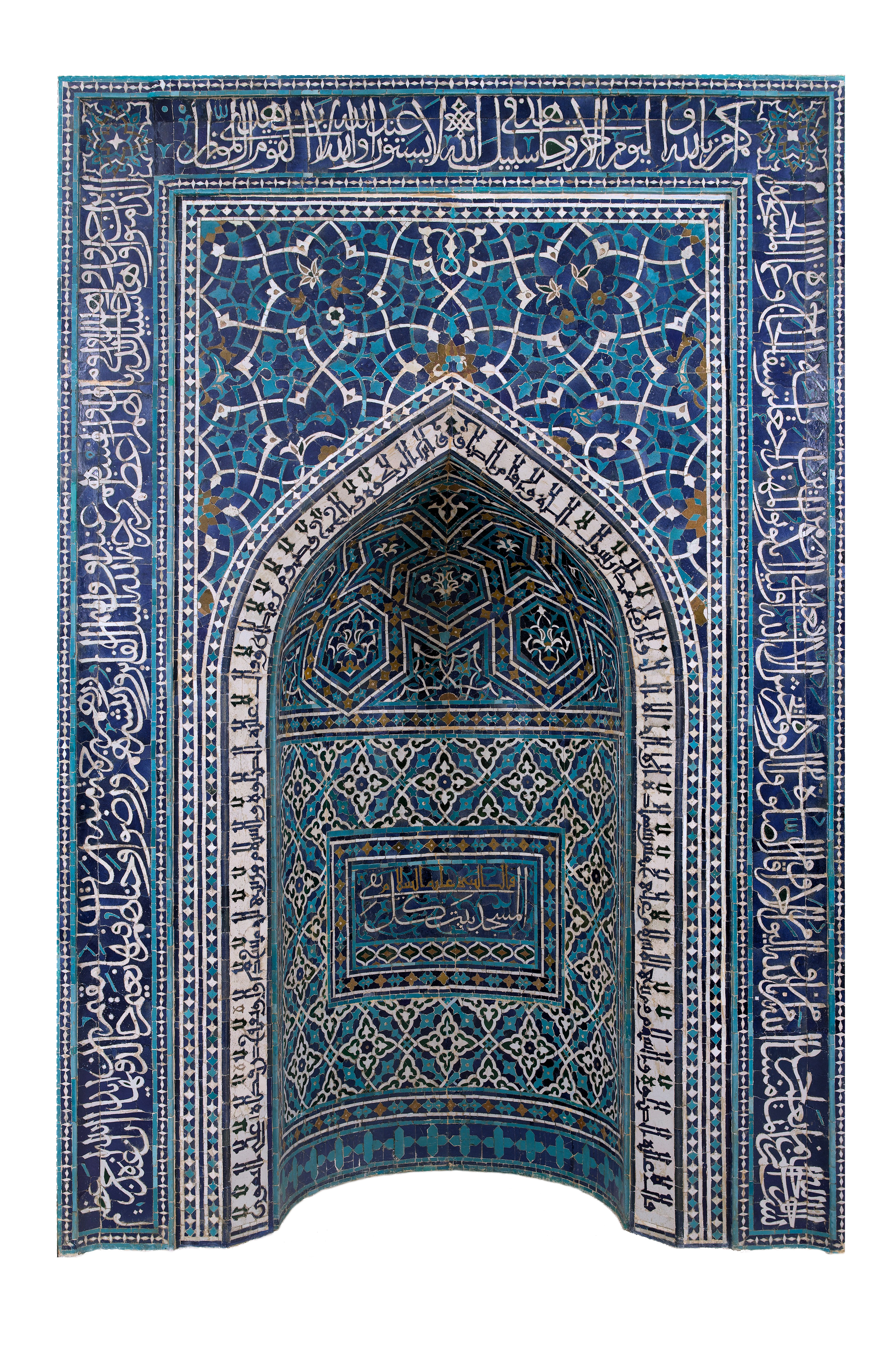
Mihrab in tile-mosaic, dated 755 AH (1354/55 CE) Madrasa Imami, Isfahan. Injuid.

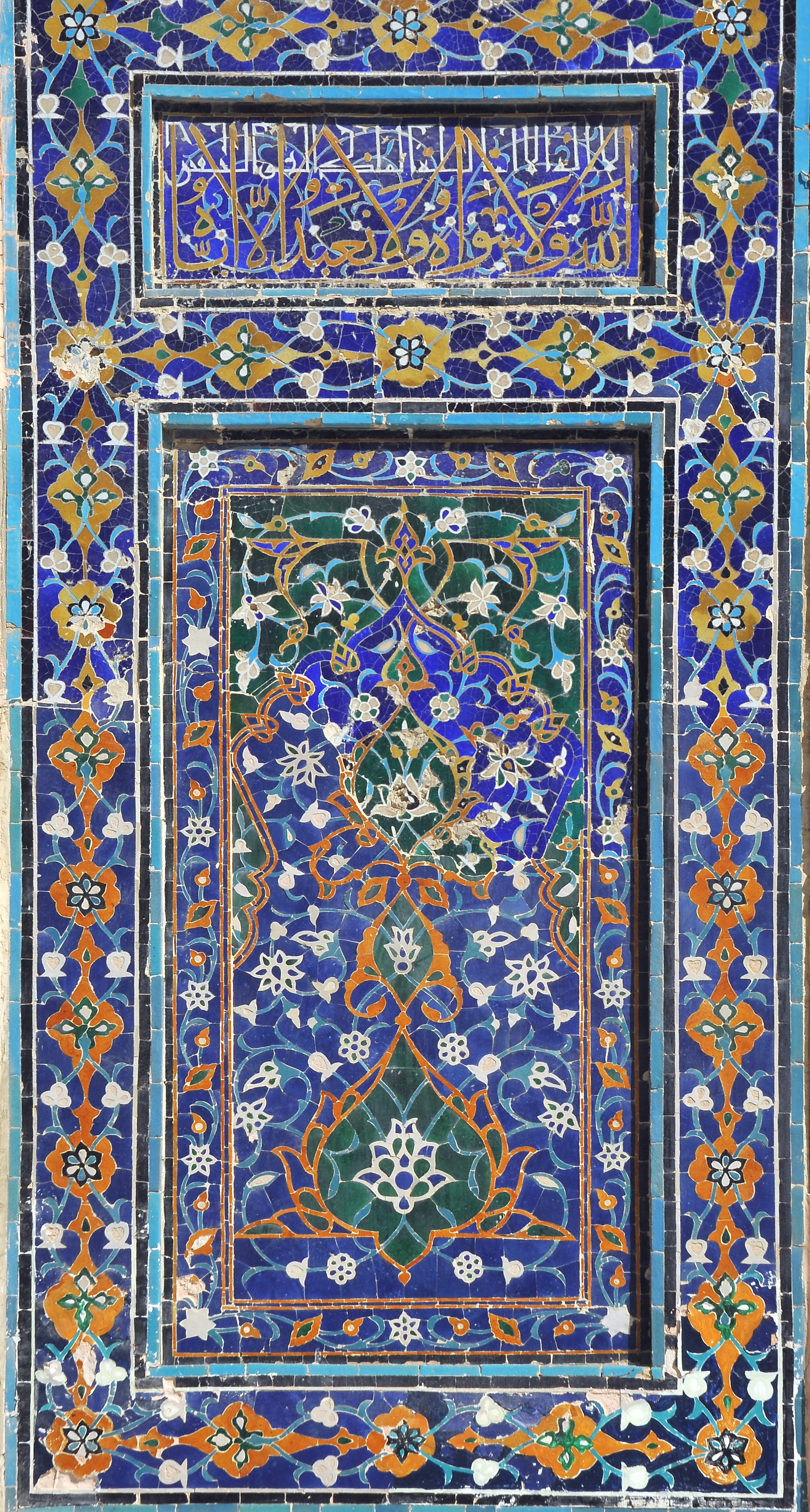
A 15th century Tumurid Mo'araq, Ulugh Beg Madrasa, Samarkand, 1417–1421

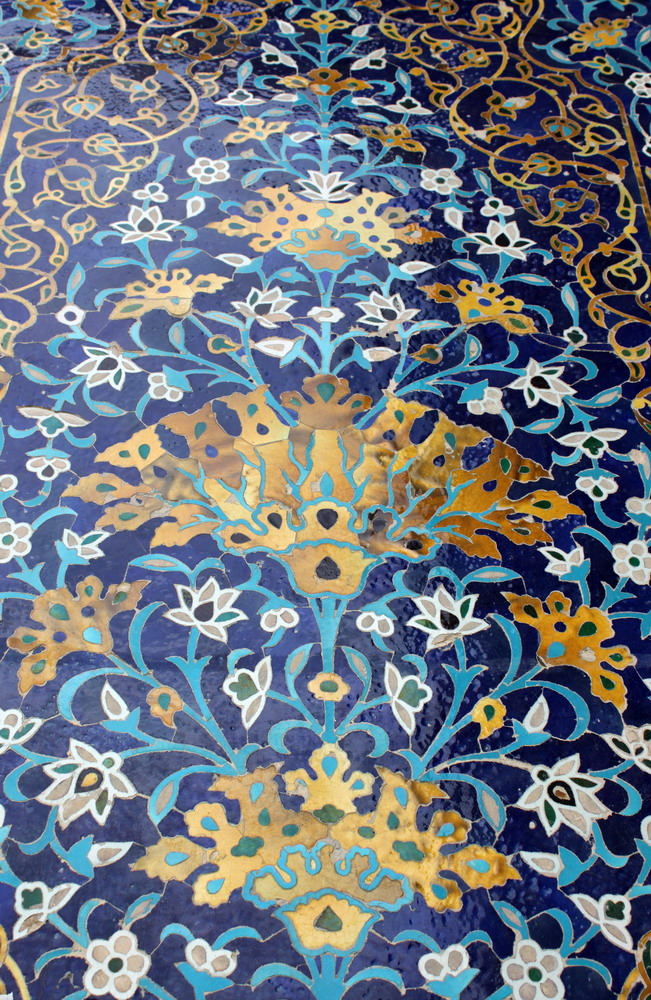
Mo'araq, Qara Qoyunlu tilework at Darb-e Imam, 1453

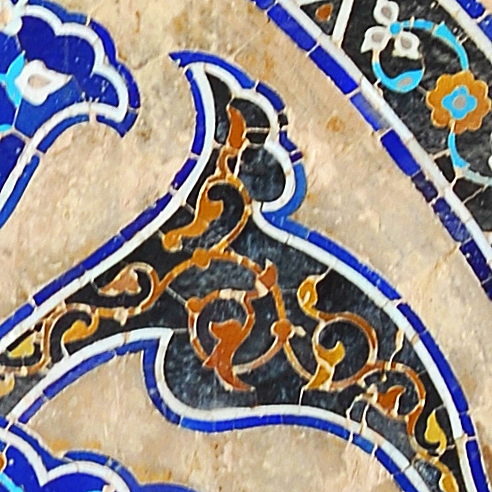
Detail of mo'araq inlay technique. Jameh Mosque of Isfahan, circa 1475/76

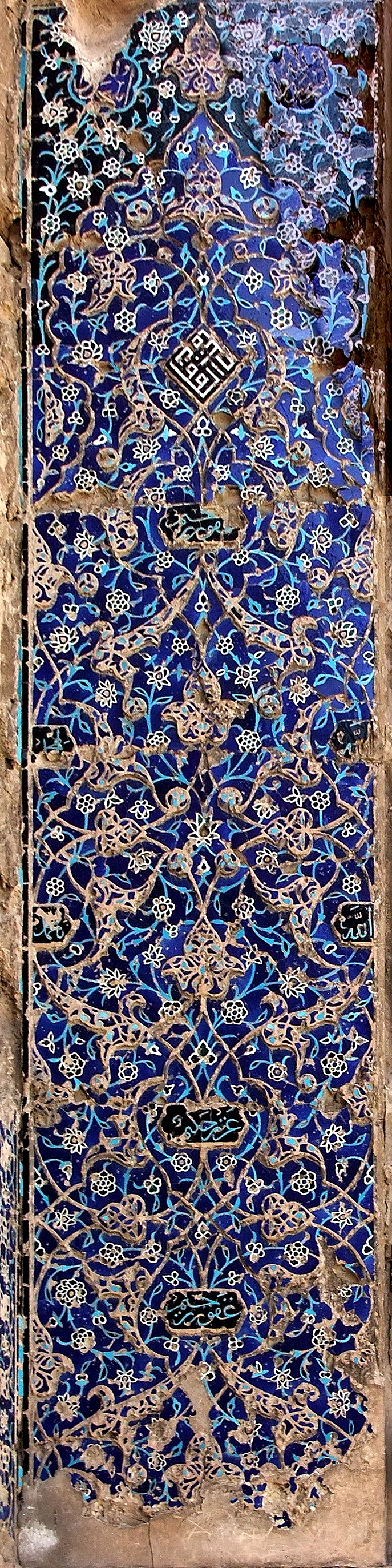
Mo'araq, Qara Qoyunlu tilework at the Blue Mosque, Tabriz, 1465

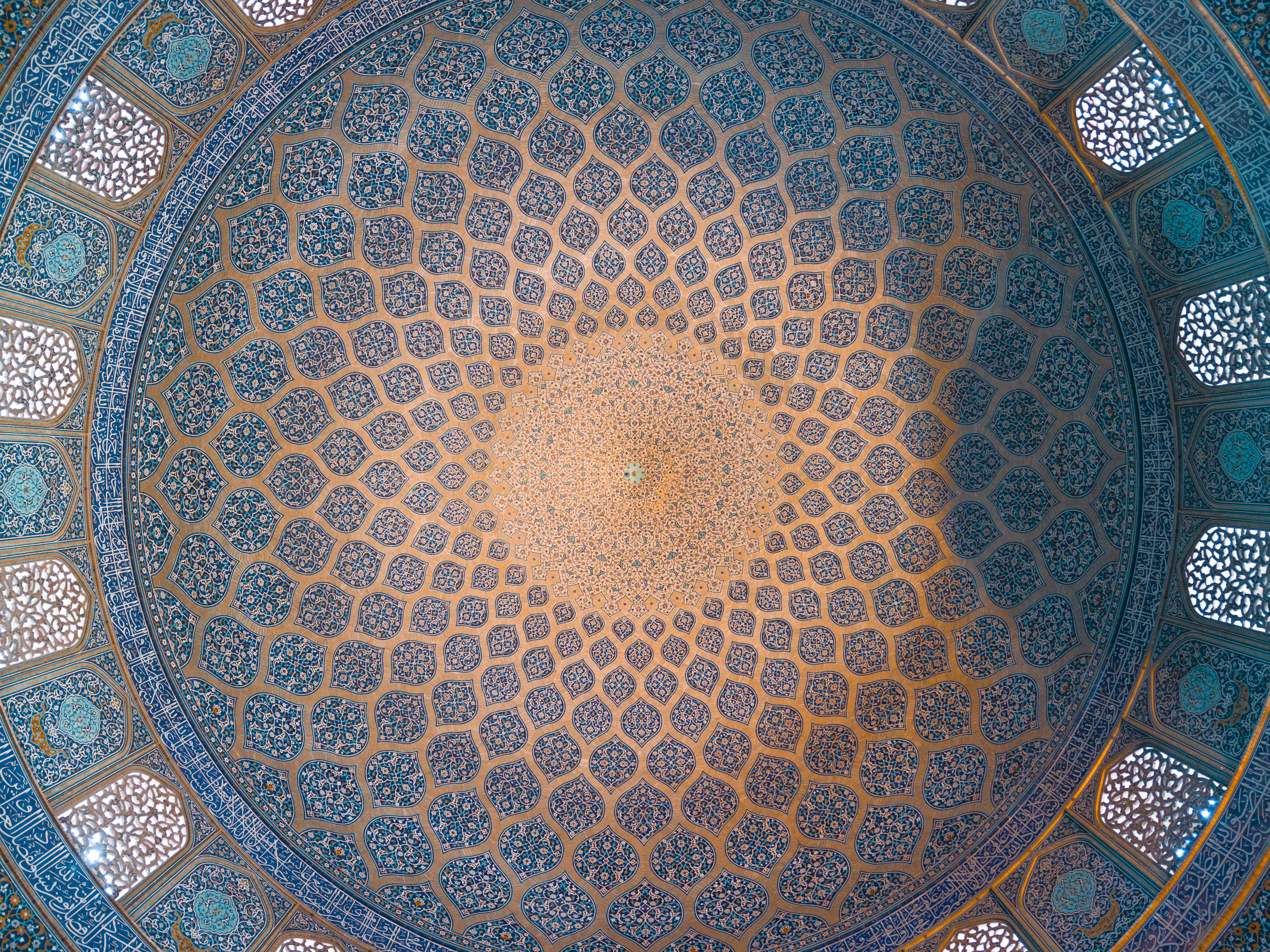
Mo'araq dome, Sheikh Lotfollah Mosque, Isfahan, 1603–1619

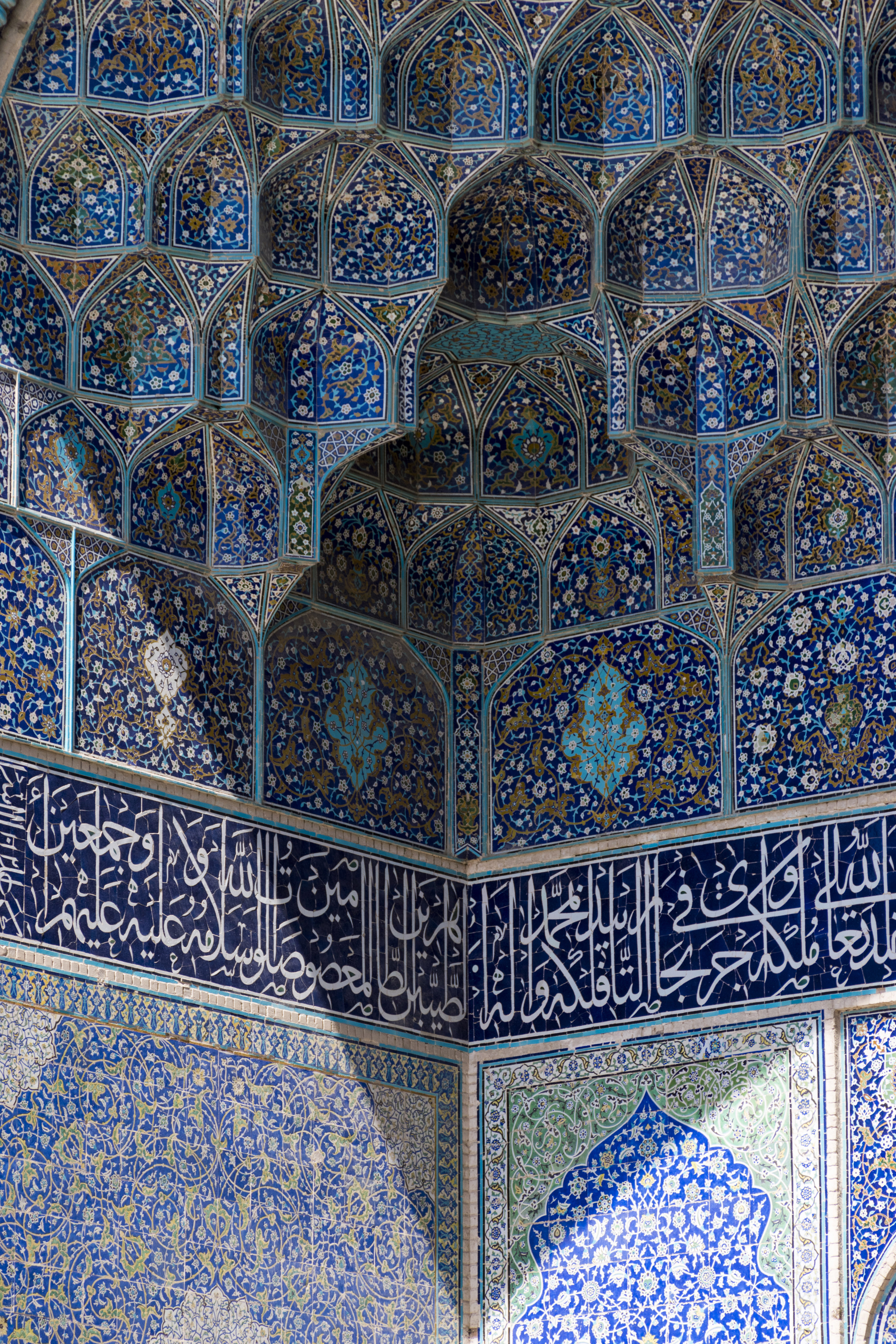
Comparison of Mo'araq (above the inscriptions) and Haft-Rang (below), Sheikh Lotfollah Mosque

== See also ==
- Persian art

== Sources ==
- Bloom, Jonathan M. (2006). "Paper:The transformative medium in Ilkhanid art". In Komaroff, Linda (ed.). Beyond the legacy of Genghis Khan. Leiden; Boston: Brill. pp. 289–302. doi:10.1163/9789047418573_021. ISBN 978-9004150836.
