= Herod's Palace =

Herod’s Palace may refer to any of several palace-fortresses built (or rebuilt from previous fortresses) during the reign of Herod the Great, King of Judea from 37 BC to 4 BC. Mostly in ruins today, several have been excavated.

- Herod's Palace (Jerusalem), in the northwest corner of the city walls of the Upper City
- Herod's Palace (Herodium), winter palace at Herodium in the Judean desert 12 kilometers south of Jerusalem
- Masada, on a small mountain
- Caesarea Maritima, on a promontory in the sea
- Three winter palaces at Jericho
- Machaerus, Hasmonean fortress rebuilt by Herod in 30 BC
- Cypros Palace near Jericho, named by Herod in memory of his mother, Cypros
- Alexandrium, a Hasmonean palace which Herod rebuilt lavishly.

== See also ==
- Herods Hotels, a luxury hotel brand
- Herodian architecture
