= Gök Medrese, Tokat =

Madrasa in Tokat, Turkey

Gök Medrese
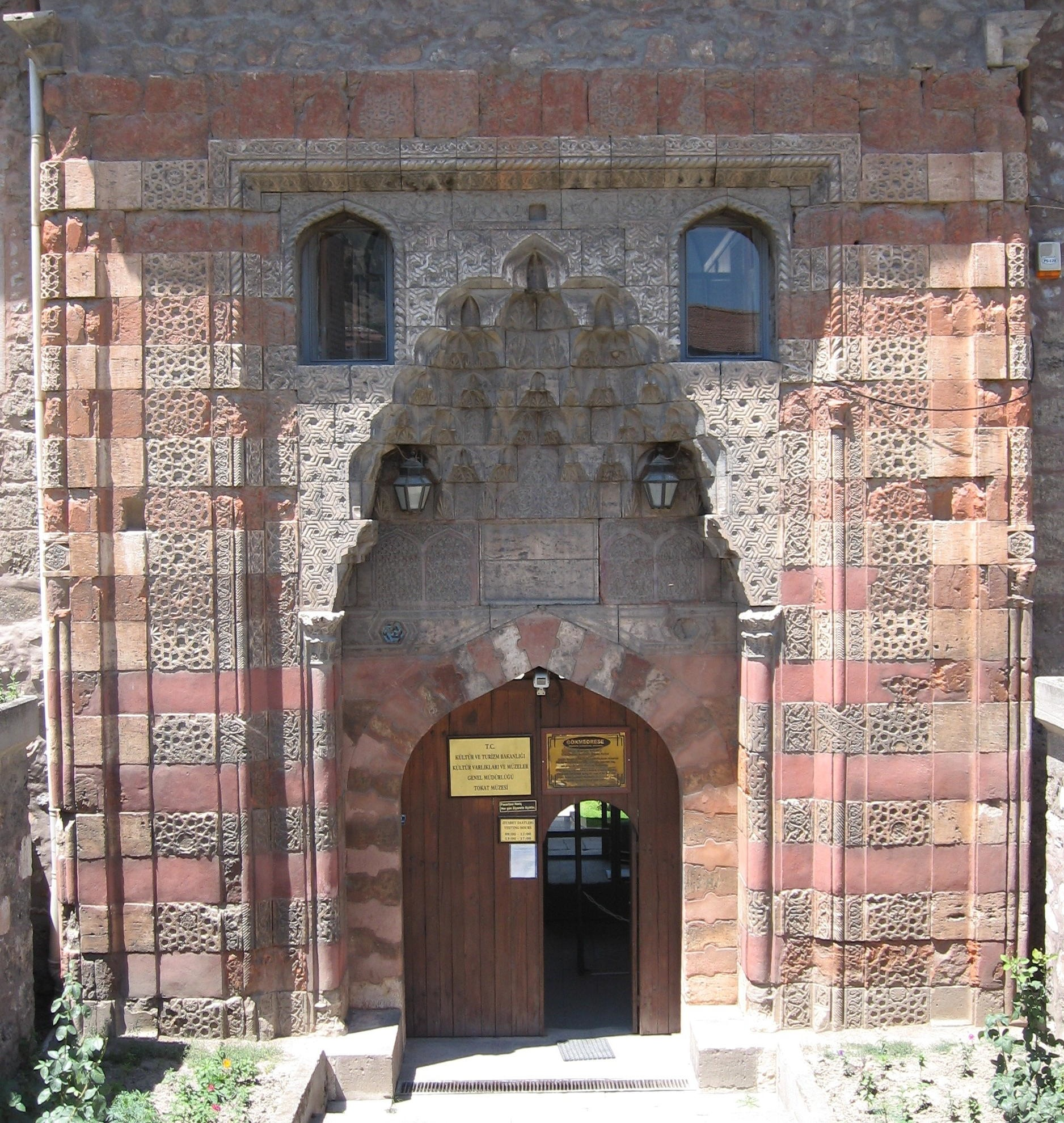

Religion
- Affiliation: Islam

Location
- Location: Tokat, Turkey
- Interactive map of Gök Medrese
- Coordinates: 40.1850°N 36.3315°E

Architecture
- Architect: ?
- Type: Madrasah
- Style: Seljuk
- Completed: 13th-century
- Direction of façade: west-southwest

Gökmedrese or Gök Medrese, is a 13th-century Anatolian Seljuk medrese, in Tokat, Turkey. It is dated to 1269-1270. The patron was Mu'in al-Din Suleyman (a vizier of the Seljuk Sultanate of Rum).

The Gök Medrese is acknowledged for possibly the earliest known example of pure Mo'araq mosaic: complete inlaid cut-tilework with no intervening space between the tile fragments.

An example of Seljuk architecture, the building hosted for years the "Tokat Müzesi" (Museum of Tokat), an archaeological and ethnographical museum, until the latter moved in 2012 to a location in the bedesten area.

== See also ==
- Hatuniye Külliyesi

== Sources ==
- Bloom, Jonathan M. (2006). "Paper: The transformative medium in Ilkhanid art". Beyond the legacy of Genghis Khan. Leiden; Boston: Brill. doi:10.1163/9789047418573_021. ISBN 978-9004150836.

== Gallery ==
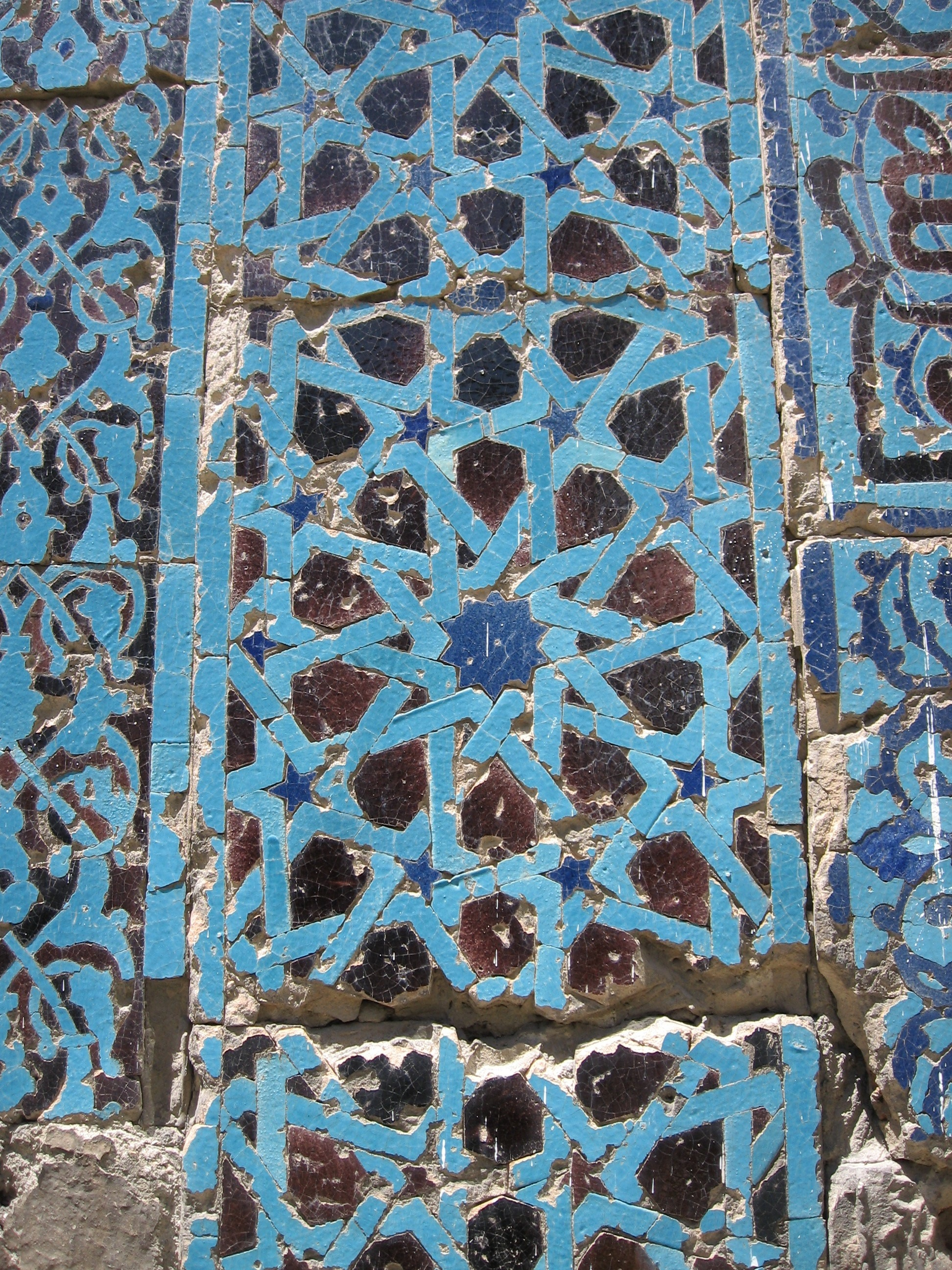
Seljuk tile mosaic, Gök Medrese, 1269-1270

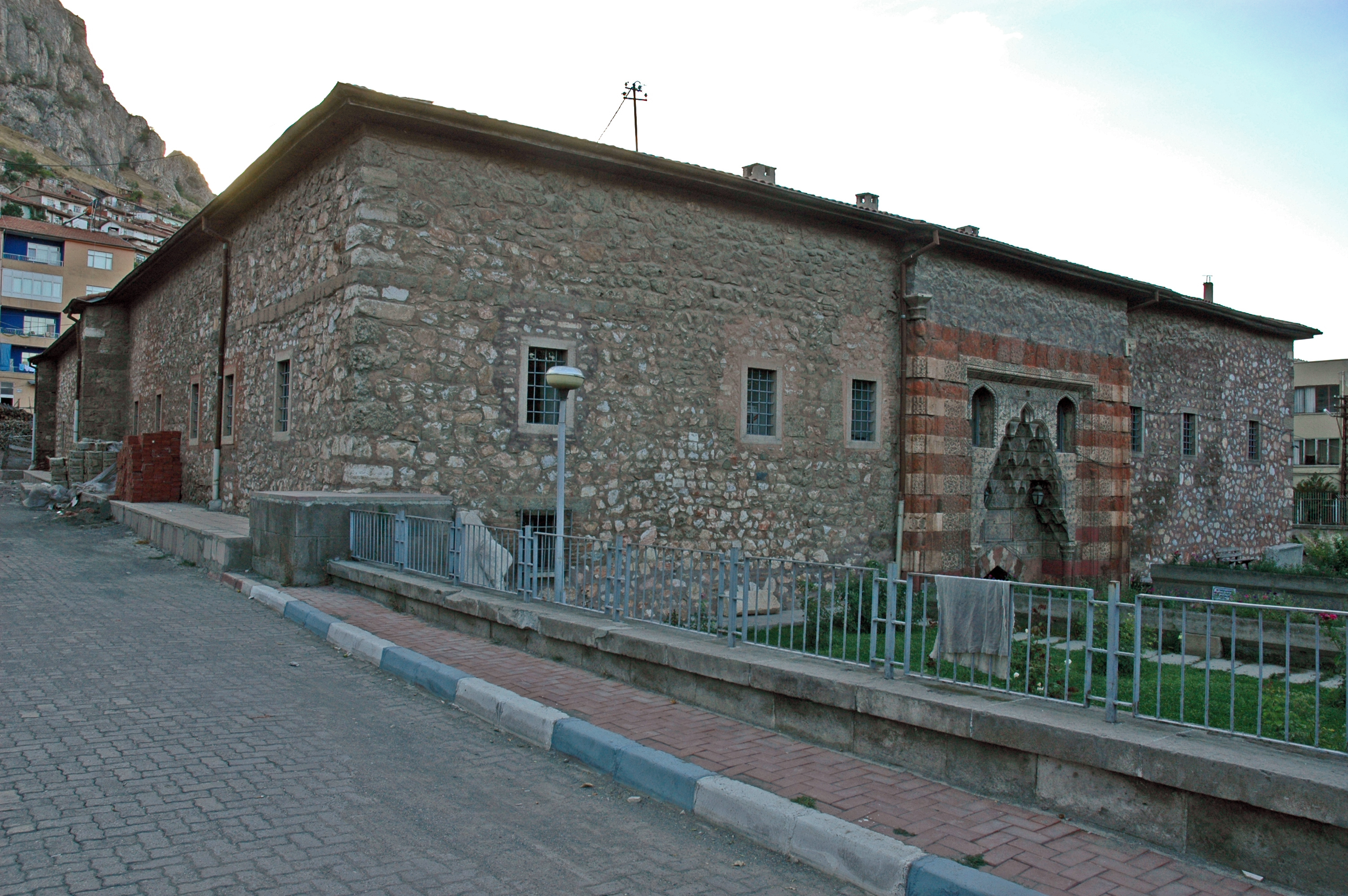
Gök Medrese Tokat as Museum general view

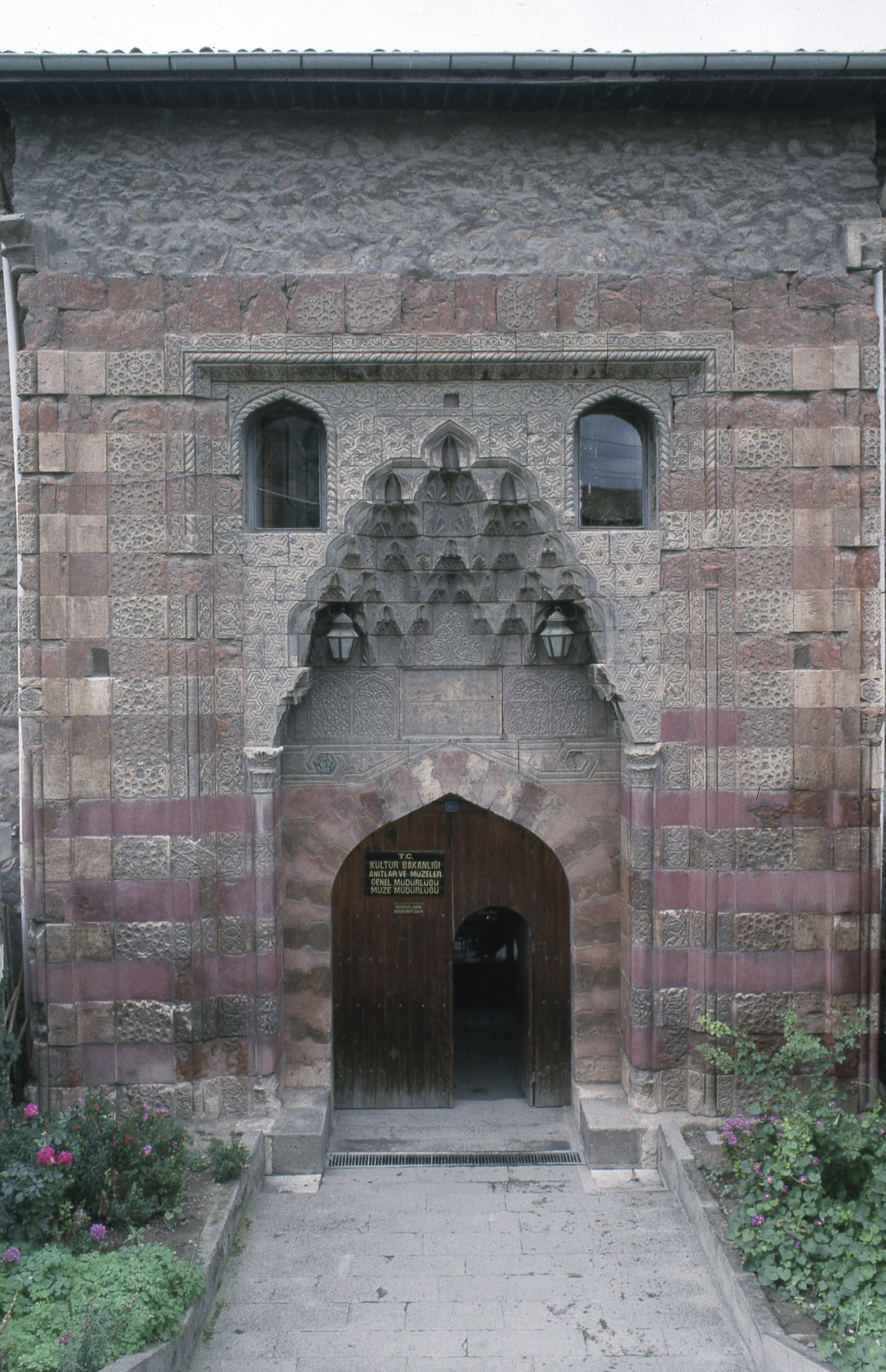
Gök Medrese Tokat as Museum Detail of front

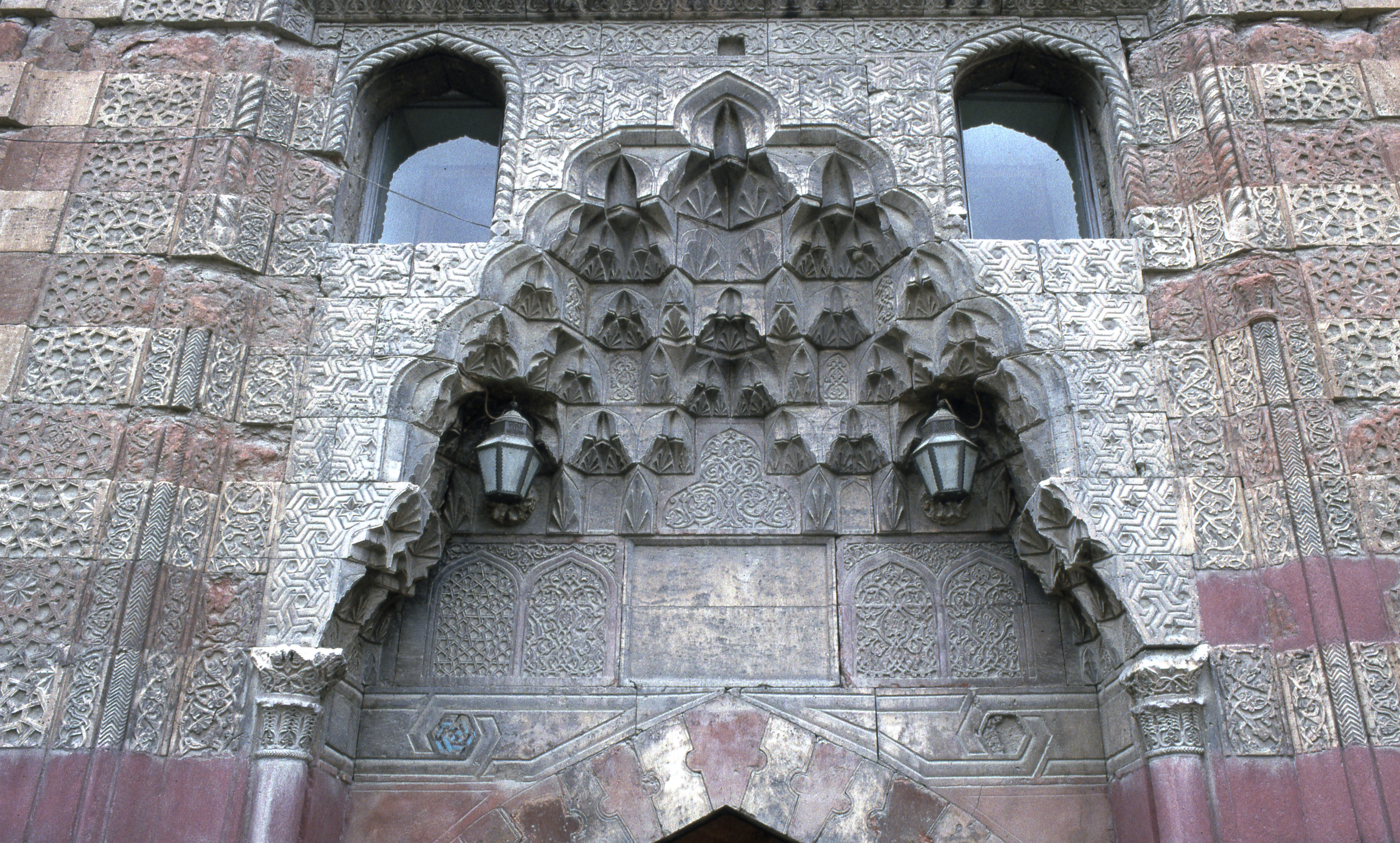
Gök Medrese Tokat as Museum Detail of front

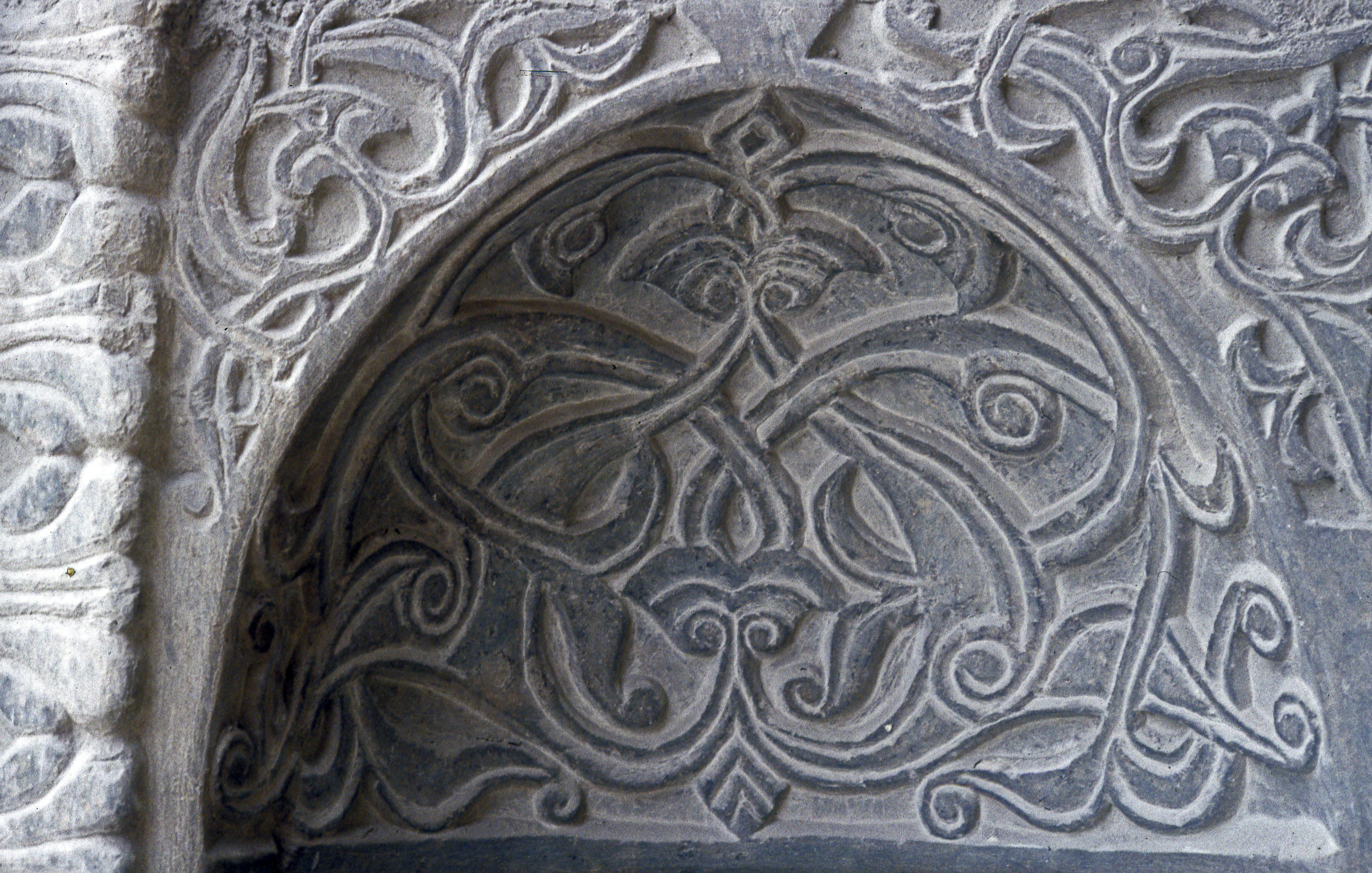
Gök Medrese Tokat as Museum Detail of front

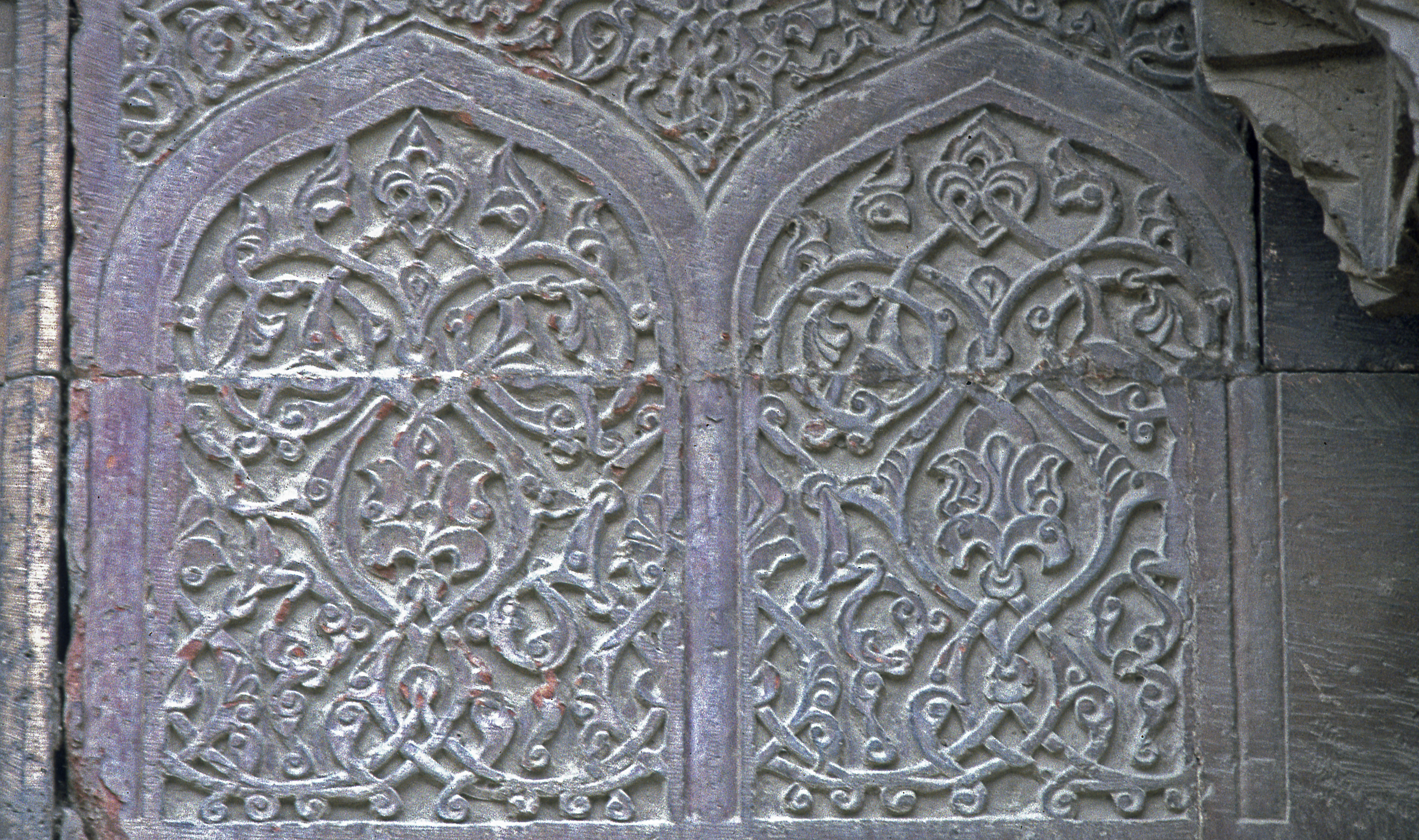
Gök Medrese Tokat as Museum Detail of front

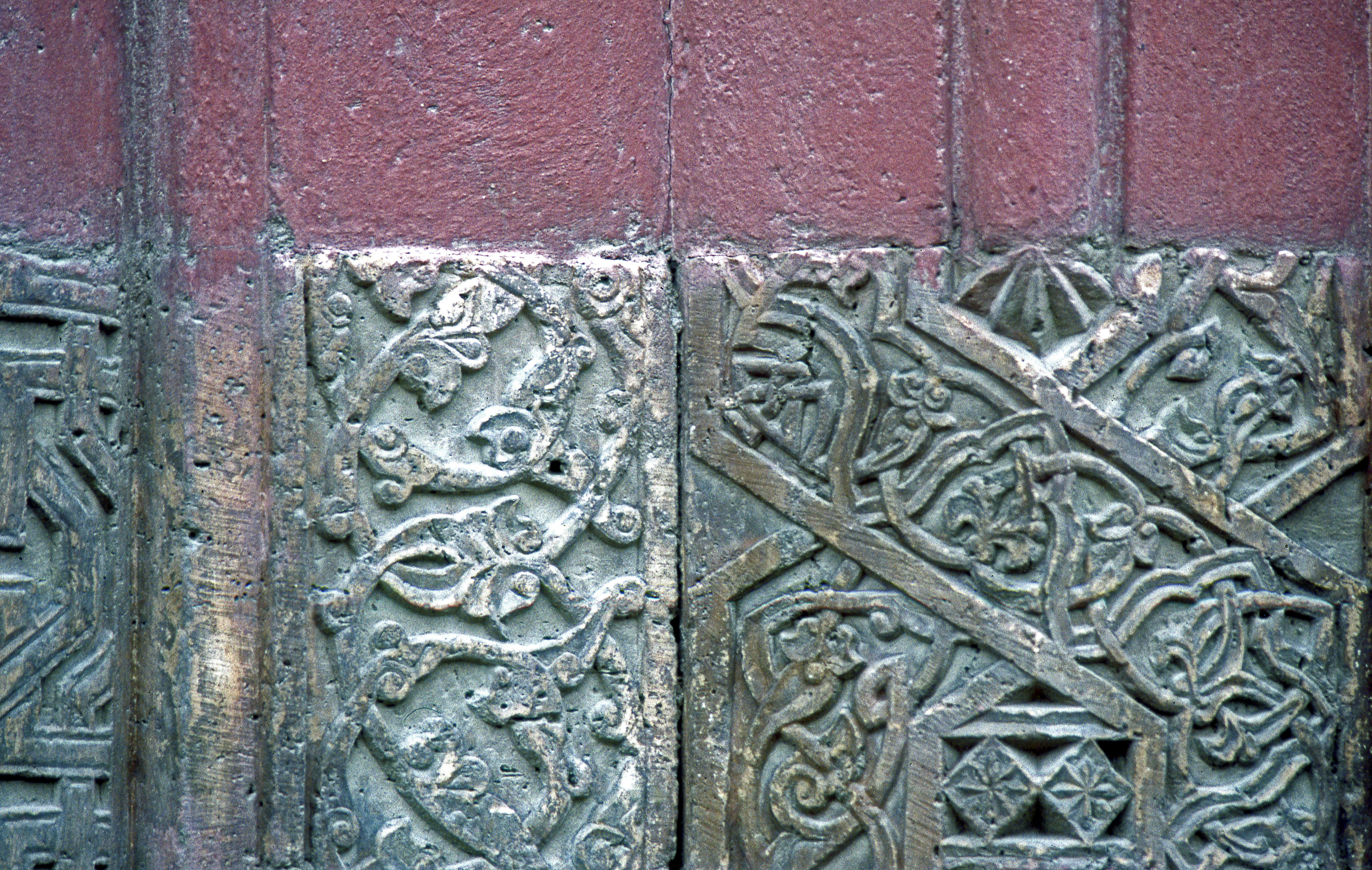
Gök Medrese Tokat as Museum Detail of front

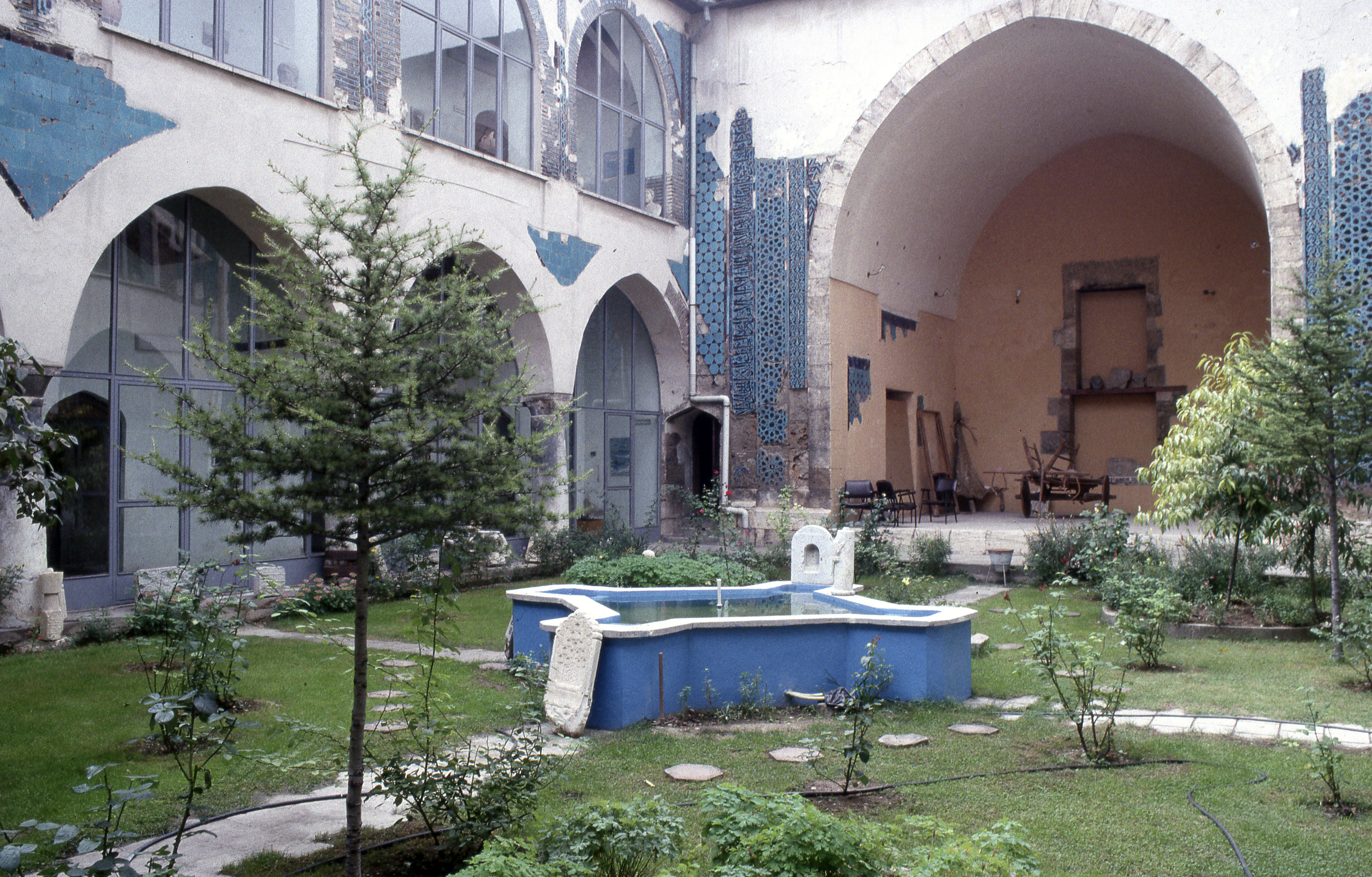
Gök Medrese Tokat as Museum Garden area

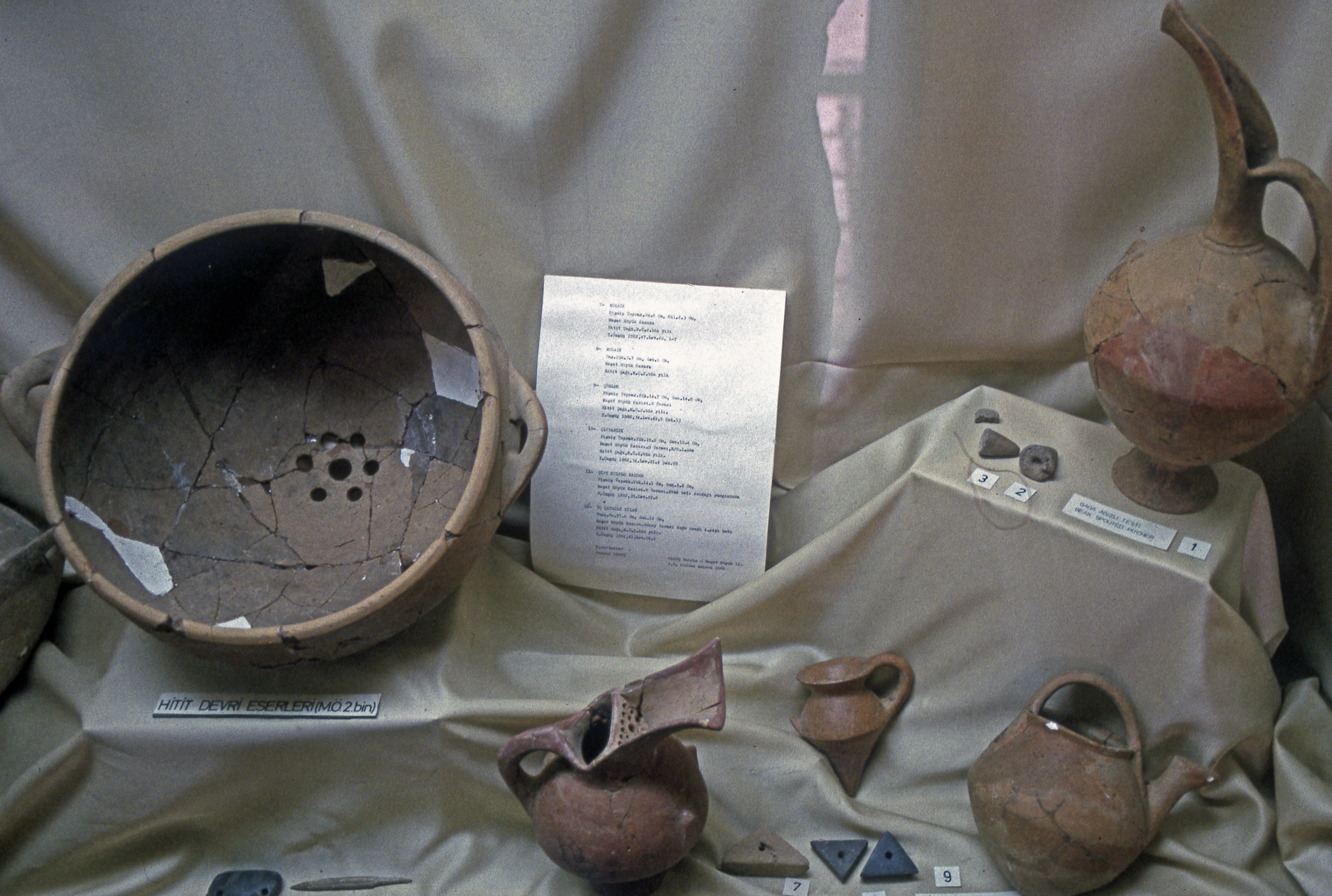
Gök Medrese Tokat as Museum Hittite exhibits

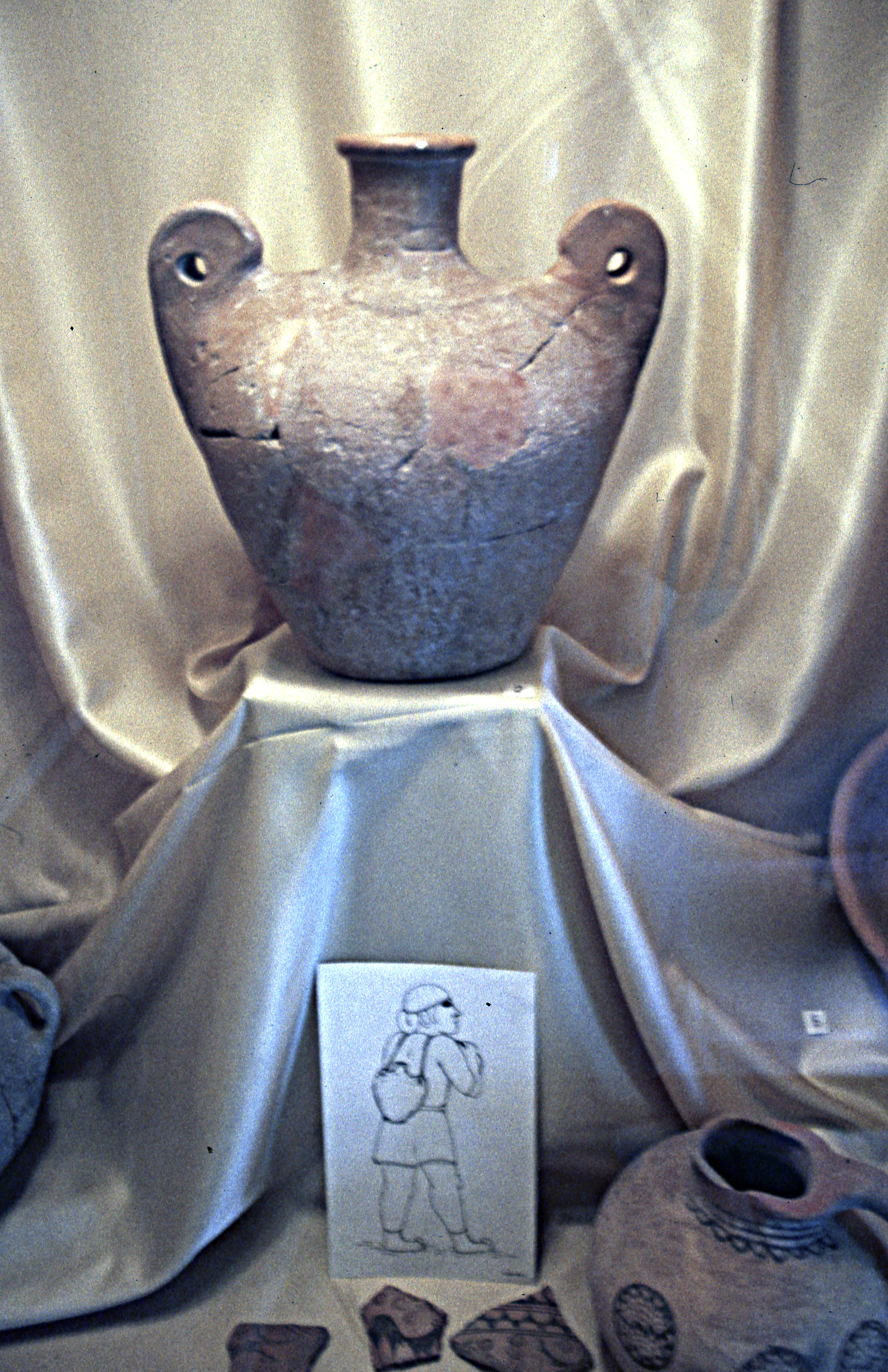
Gök Medrese Tokat as Museum Water carrier

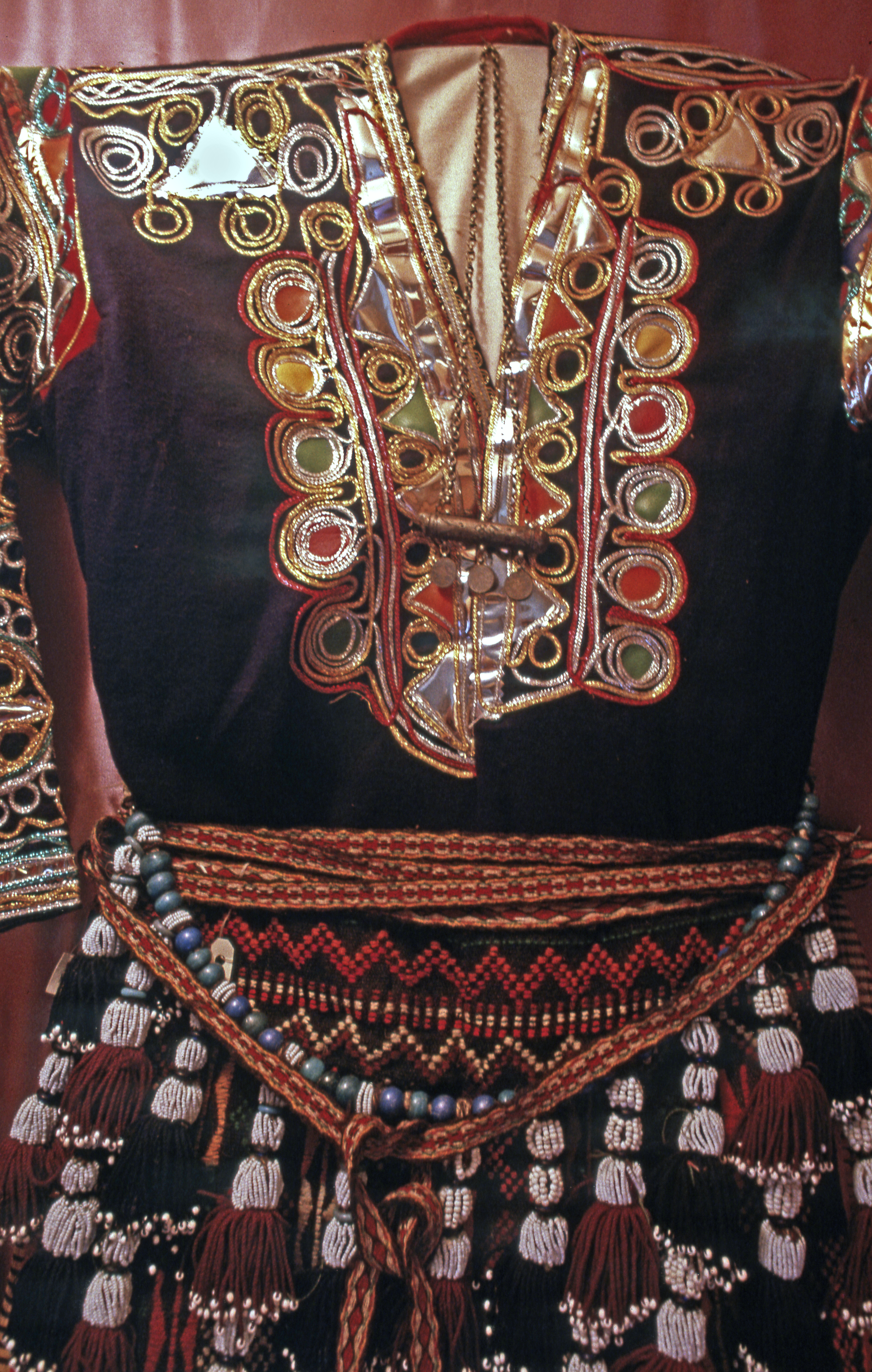
Gök Medrese Tokat as Museum Probably 19th century dress

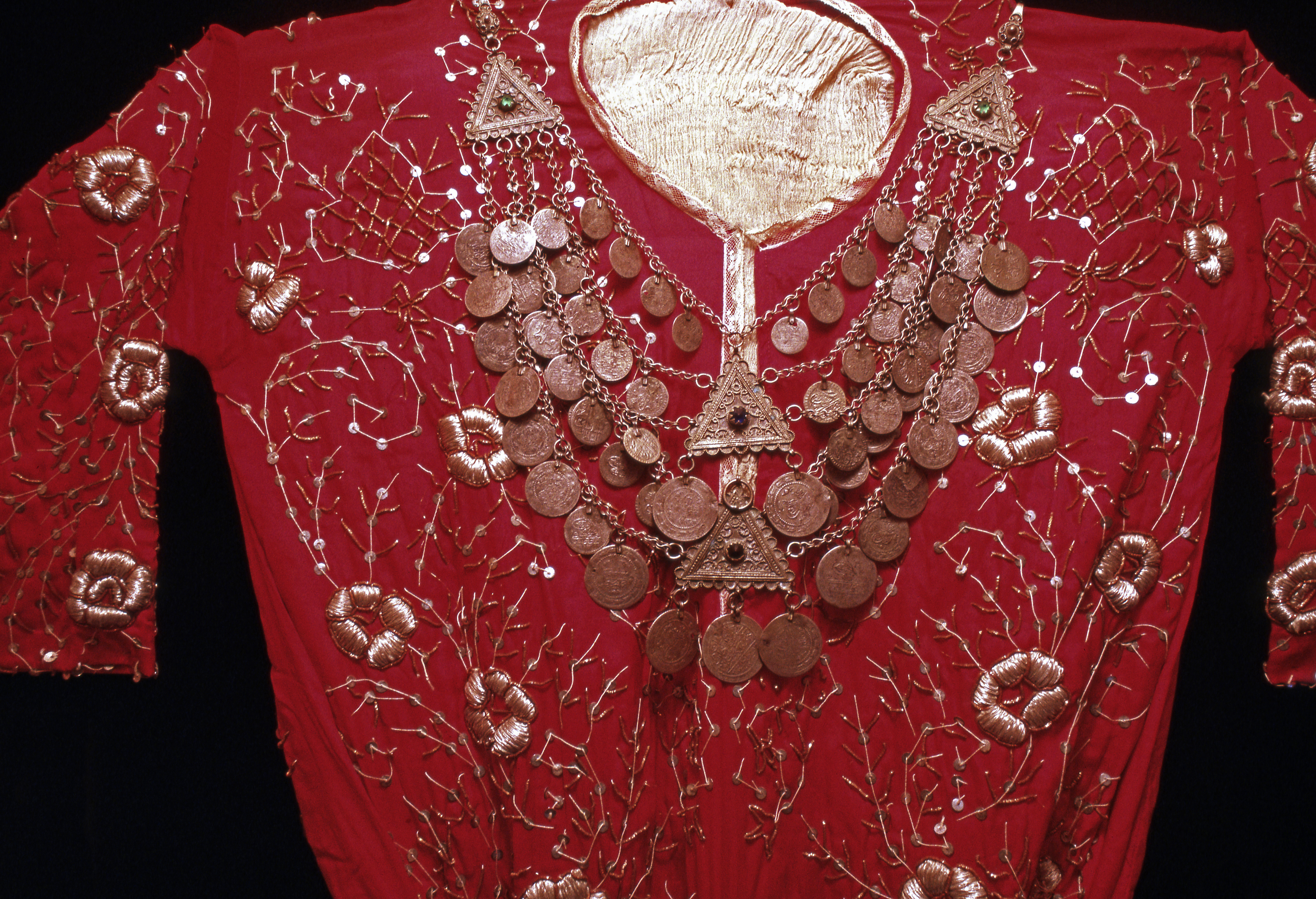
Gök Medrese Tokat as Museum Dress and necklace
