= Herod's Palace (Jerusalem) =

Royal complex in Jerusalem destroyed during the First Jewish Revolt

Coordinates: 31°46′33.9″N 35°13′40.93″E

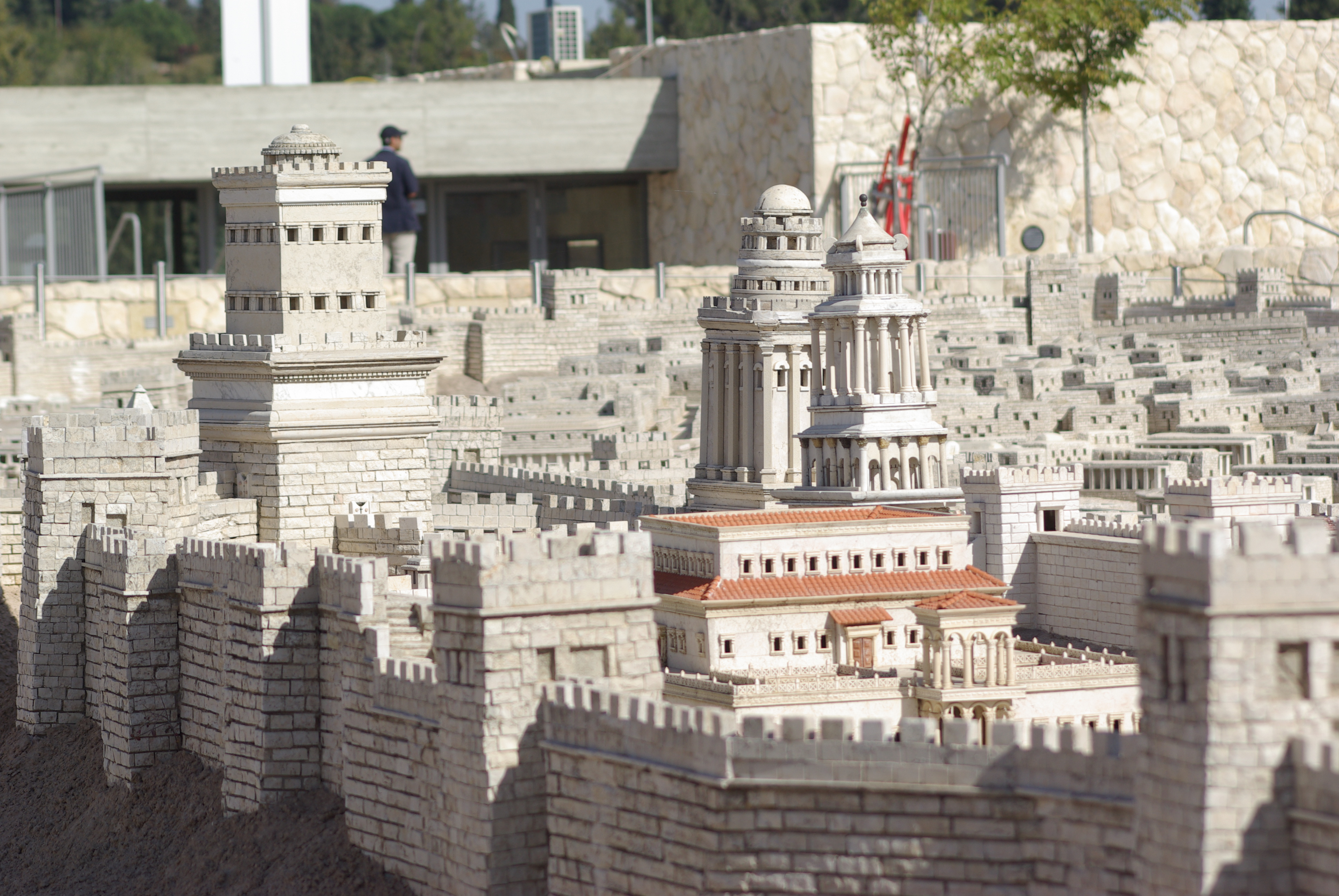
Model of Herod's Jerusalem Palace-Fortress in the northwest corner of the Upper City walls. The three towers, from L to R, are Phasael, Hippicus, and Mariamne. Just beneath the latter two, a portion of the reconstruction of the palace building itself is visible.

Herod's Palace at Jerusalem was built in the last quarter of the 1st century BC by King Herod the Great of Judea from 37 BC to 4 BC. It was the second most important building in Jerusalem, after the Temple itself; in Herod's day and was situated at the northwestern wall of the Upper City of Jerusalem (the Western Hill abandoned after the Babylonian sacking of Jerusalem). Herod lived in it as a principal residence, but not permanently, as he owned other palace-fortresses, notably at Masada, Herodium and Caesarea Maritima. Nothing remains of the Jerusalem Palace today except for portions of the surrounding wall-and-tower complex, much altered and generally known as "the Citadel" (see Tower of David). The site of the former palace is now occupied by the Tower of David Museum, a police station, and a former Turkish barracks/prison known as the Kishle.

== Location and associated structures ==
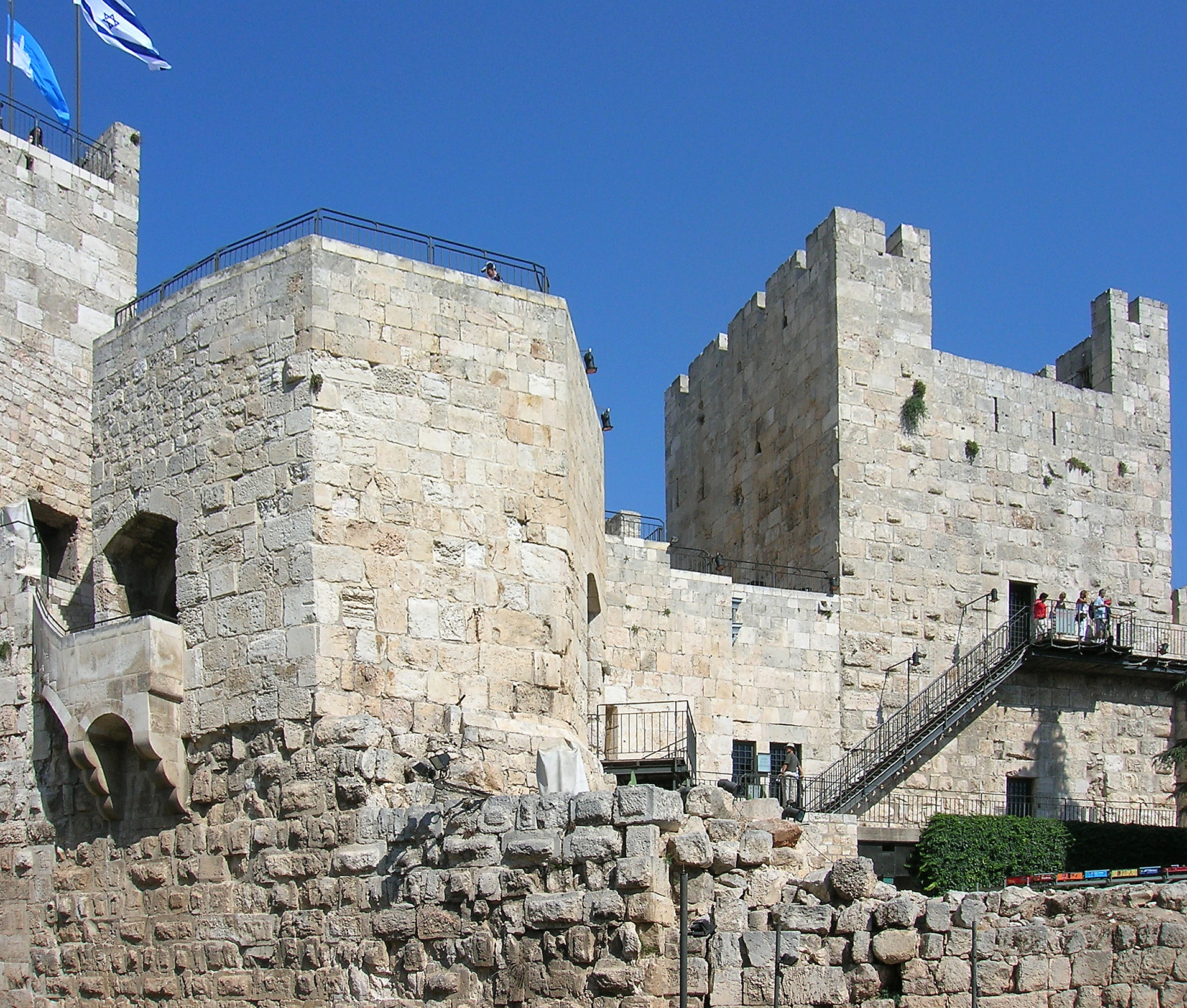
The "Tower of David"—seen here from the inner courtyard of the Citadel—was built on the base of the Tower of Hippicus.

Herod's palace-fortress in Jerusalem stood along the western city wall, in the area now occupied by the Armenian Quarter, starting in the north at the Kishle building and ending at the present line of the modern (Ottoman period) wall west of Zion Gate. It consisted mainly of two palace wings placed north and south of a large garden. Immediately north of the complex, in the area of today's Citadel and Jaffa Gate, Herod erected three huge towers, as an additional protection and last refuge in case of danger. These he called after people close to him – Hippicus after a friend, Phasael after his brother, and Mariamne after his favourite wife. These towers strengthened the northwest corner of the First Wall, the city wall built by the Hasmoneans sometime between 152 and 134 BC. Of the three towers, only the massive lower part of the Hippicus Tower (or the Phasael Tower, according to some researchers) have survived. Remains of two older, Hasmonean towers (the Southern and Middle Towers) have been found in the present Citadel courtyard, which are unrelated to the missing Herodian towers.

During the Byzantine period, the tower, and by extension the Citadel as a whole, acquired its alternative name – the Tower of David – after the Byzantines, mistakenly identifying the hill as Mount Zion, presumed it to be David's palace. This name is still in use today, although in the 19th century an Ottoman minaret erected between 1635 and 1665 over the southern wall of the Citadel took over the title of "Tower of David", so that the name can now refer to either the whole Citadel or the minaret alone.

== Description ==
As with his Temple, Herod's Jerusalem Palace was constructed on an elevated platform of about 1,000 feet (north–south) by 180 feet (east–west). Resting on a series of retaining walls rising 13 to 16 feet above ground level. It consisted of two main buildings, each with its own banquet halls, baths, and accommodations for hundreds of guests. The two wings were named after Agrippa and Caesar. In the center of the palace were gardens with porticoes. The grounds included groves, canals, and ponds fitted with bronze fountains. The praetorium at the Palace was, after Herod's death, the official residence of the Roman governors when they came to Jerusalem during major Jewish festivals. This was probably the site of the trial of Jesus of Nazareth by Pontius Pilate (see Pilate's court).

To the north of Herod's Palace were the three immense towers,

- The Phasael Tower was the largest. It was named after Herod's brother and stood 145 feet high.
- The Hippicus Tower was named after a friend of Herod and stood 132 feet high.
- The Mariamne Tower was named after Herod's Hasmonean wife whom he had executed. Josephus said that "the king considering it appropriate that the tower named after a woman should surpass in decoration those called after men." It stood 74 feet high and was accounted the most beautiful of the three.

== Josephus' description ==
The ancient writer and historian Josephus vividly described the "wondrous" palace in The Wars of the Jews (ca. 75 AD). Book 5, chapter 4 tells that

The largeness also of the stones was wonderful; for they were not made of common small stones, nor of such large ones only as men could carry, but they were of white marble, cut out of the rock; each stone was twenty cubits in length, and ten in breadth, and five in depth. They were so exactly united to one another, that each tower looked like one entire rock of stone, so growing naturally, and afterward cut by the hand of the artificers into their present shape and corners; so little, or not at all, did their joints or connexion appear low as these towers were themselves on the north side of the wall, the king had a palace inwardly thereto adjoined, which exceeds all my ability to describe it; for it was so very curious as to want no cost nor skill in its construction, but was entirely walled about to the height of thirty cubits, and was adorned with towers at equal distances, and with large bed-chambers, that would contain beds for a hundred guests a-piece, in which the variety of the stones is not to be expressed; for a large quantity of those that were rare of that kind was collected together. Their roofs were also wonderful, both for the length of the beams, and the splendor of their ornaments. The number of the rooms was also very great, and the variety of the figures that were about them was prodigious; their furniture was complete, and the greatest part of the vessels that were put in them was of silver and gold. There were besides many porticoes, one beyond another, round about, and in each of those porticoes curious pillars; yet were all the courts that were exposed to the air everywhere green. There were, moreover, several groves of trees, and long walks through them, with deep canals, and cisterns, that in several parts were filled with brazen statues, through which the water ran out. There were withal many dove-courts of tame pigeons about the canals. But indeed it is not possible to give a complete description of these palaces; and the very remembrance of them is a torment to one, as putting one in mind what vastly rich buildings that fire which was kindled by the robbers hath consumed; for these were not burnt by the Romans, but by these internal plotters, as we have already related, in the beginning of their rebellion. That fire began at the tower of Antonia, and went on to the palaces, and consumed the upper parts of the three towers themselves.

== Fate of the Palace ==
At the creation of the Roman province of Judaea in the year 6 CE, its governors—holding the rank of a prefect until the year 41 and that of a procurator after that—took up residence in Herod's palace. In 66 CE, the Roman governor Gessius Florus set up a mass crucifixion of Jews, sparking the First Jewish Rebellion. Rebelling Jews entered and burnt the palace. Only the three towers remained partially standing. When the future Roman emperor Titus destroyed most of Jerusalem in 70 CE, he spared these and set up the camp of the Tenth Legion Fretensis in the area of the palace ruins, a camp which covered the entire Western Hill. One of the towers—a rebuilt Hippicus (or Phasael) Tower on its intact base—became known as the "Tower of David". This was due to the fact that during the Byzantine Period, the Western Hill had been mistakenly identified as Mount Zion and the remains of the one surviving Herodian tower were presumed to be King David's palace.

Evidence shows that Crusaders fortified and heightened the 15 foot thick Hasmonean city wall and that Arabs, who conquered Jerusalem in 637, did the same.

During the 1160s the kings of the Crusader Kingdom of Jerusalem built in the same general area a royal palace of their own, of which close to nothing remains.

A 19th-century Egyptian barracks and later prison—locally known as the Kishle—was built adjacent to the Citadel's southern moat and was used, successively, by Ibrahim Pasha's troops (1834–1840/41), the Turks (1840/41–1917), the British (1917–1948), the Jordanians (1948–1967) and in parts by the Israeli police after 1967. The Tower of David Museum, located at the Citadel, is also administering the Kishle building, thus covering the northernmost part of the palace.

== 20th and 21st century excavations ==
In the 1970s, excavations outside the city wall disclosed the exit of a water drain belonging to Herod's Palace. This culvert transported water from the palace into the Hinnom Valley. Until recently, no portion of Herod's palace proper—excluding, that is, the surrounding walls-and-towers complex—had ever been uncovered. In 2001, however, excavations disclosed two palace walls, constructed of the easily recognizable Herodian hewn giant blocks. Even these probably did not belong to the palace proper, but were part of the retaining walls for its base, a construction similar to that used by Herod at the Temple Mount. Excavations by Ruth Amiran and Avraham Eitan have also revealed some parts of the superstructure which included sections of painted plaster.

The Kishle prison excavations are accessible every Friday morning when guided tours are organised by the Tower of David Museum.

== See also ==
- Herodian architecture
