= Chinese influences on Islamic pottery =

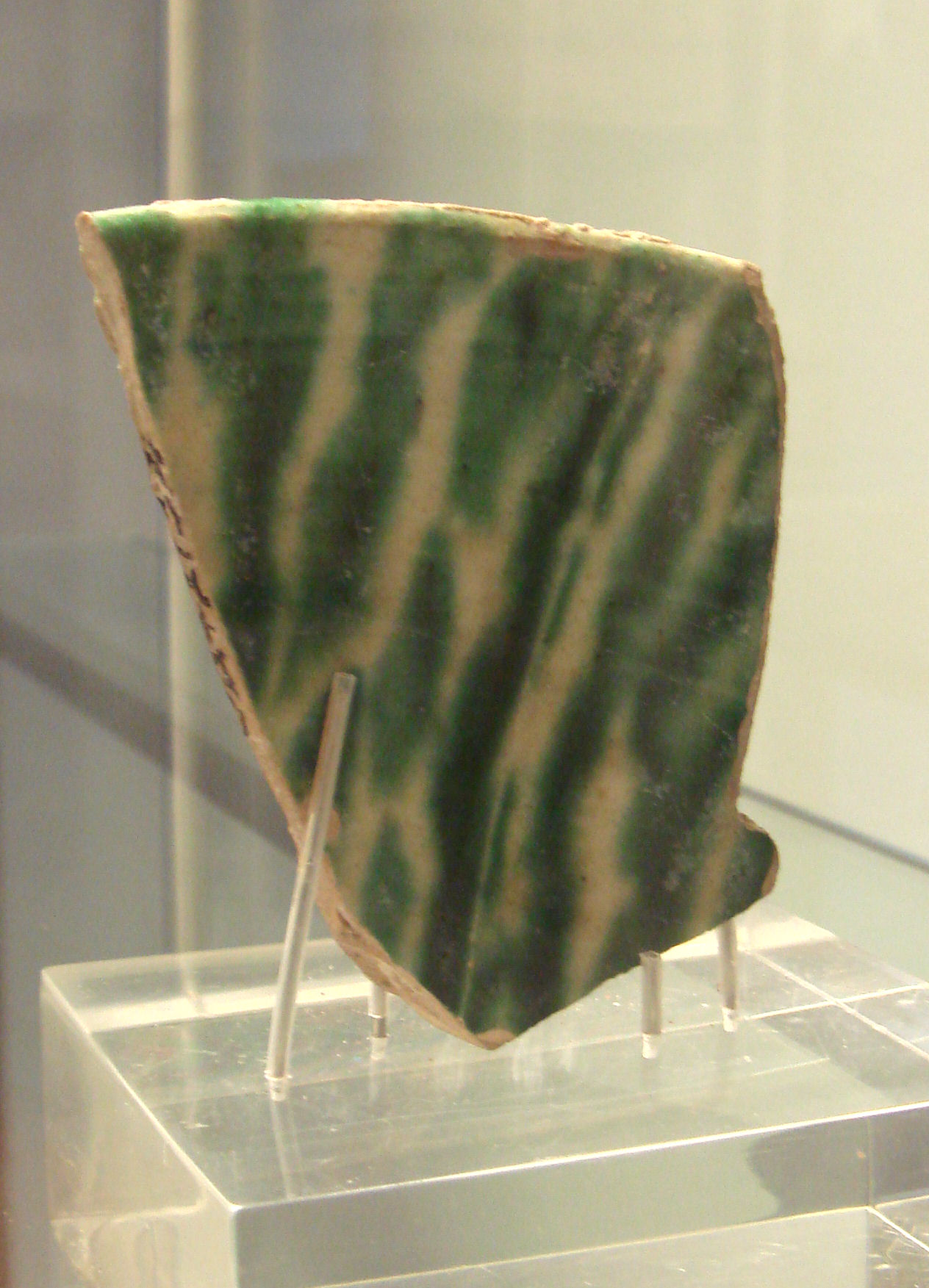
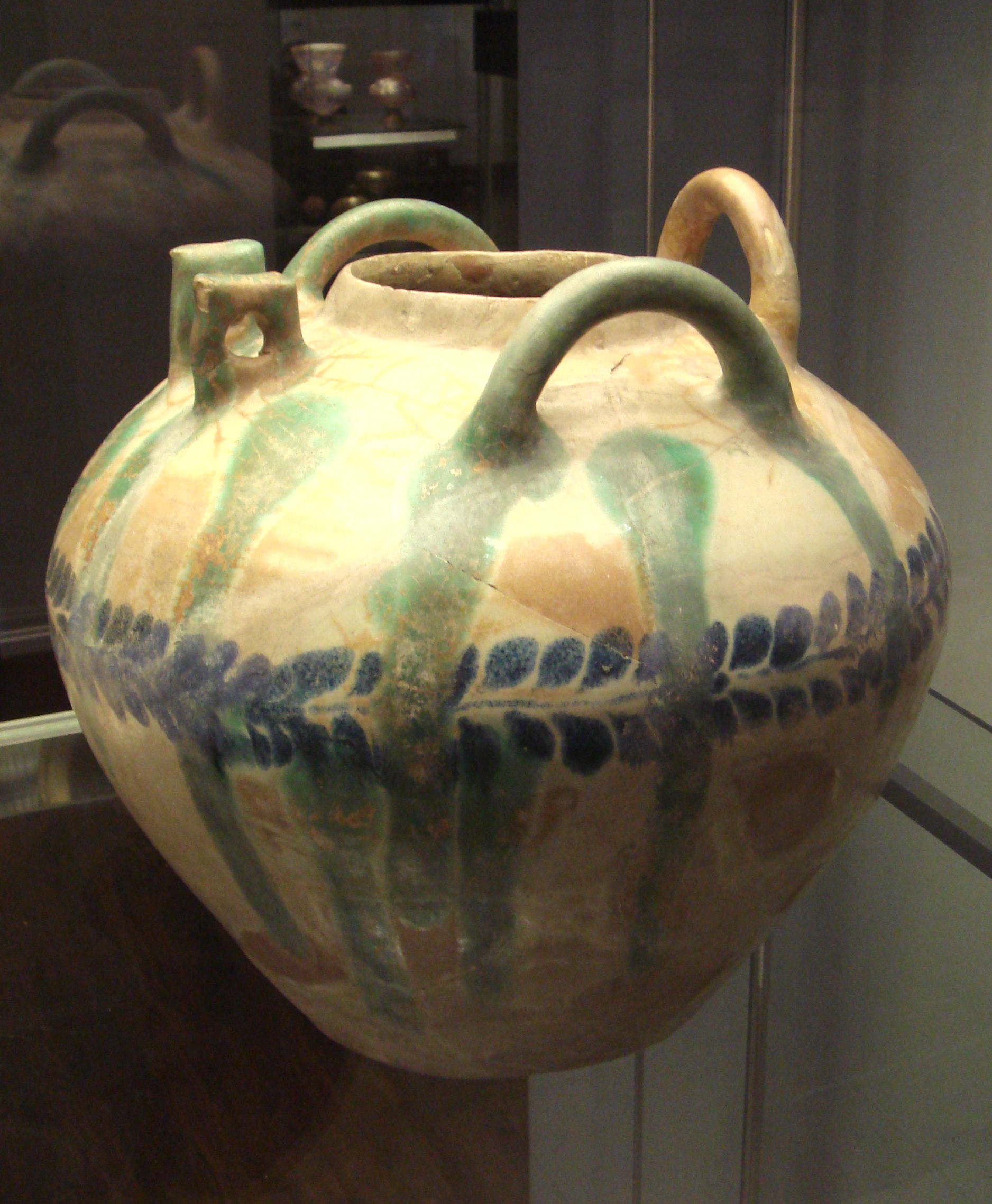
Left image: Chinese-made sancai shard, 9–10th century, found in Samarra. British Museum.
Right image: Iraqi earthen jar, 9th century, derived from Tang export wares. British Museum.
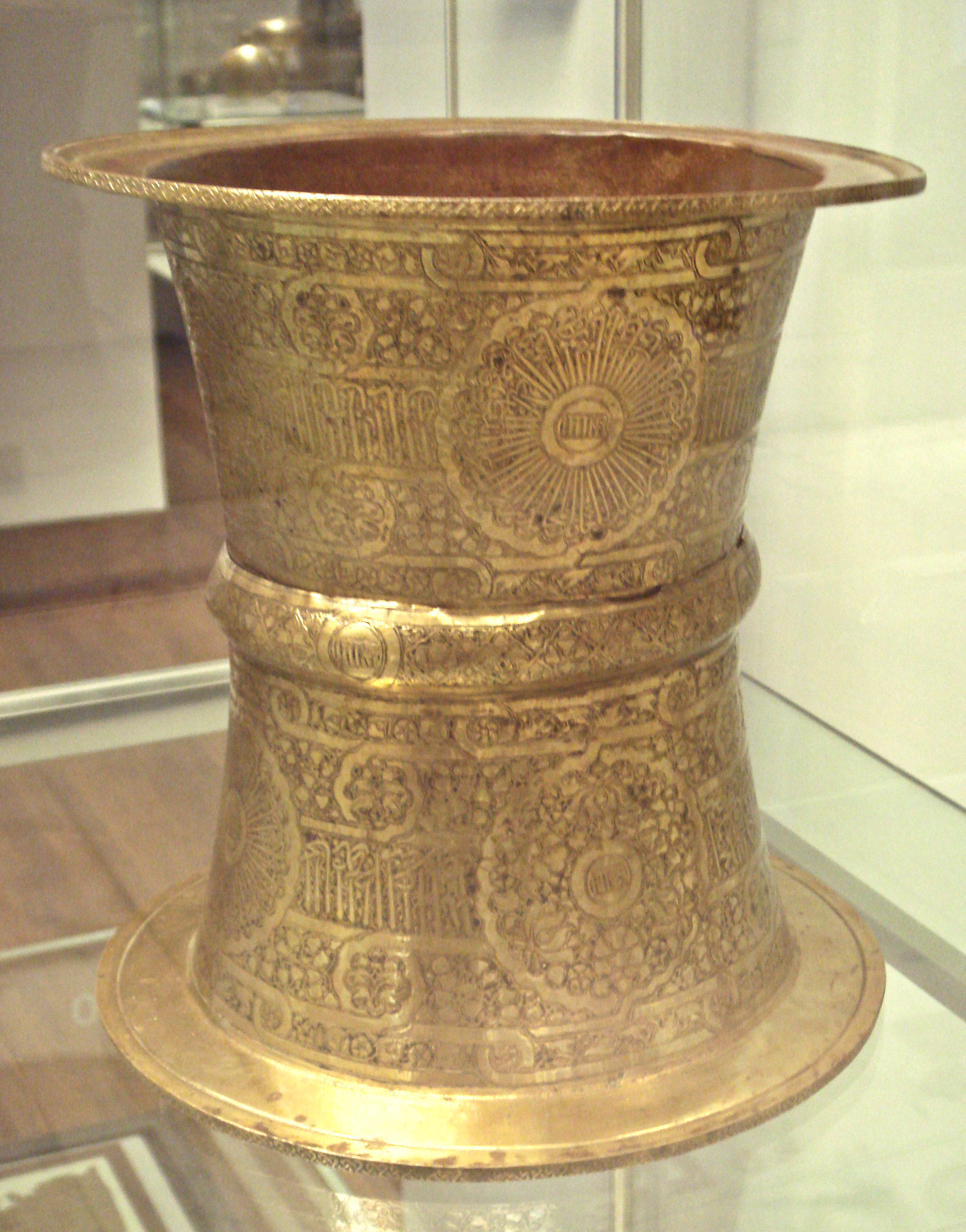
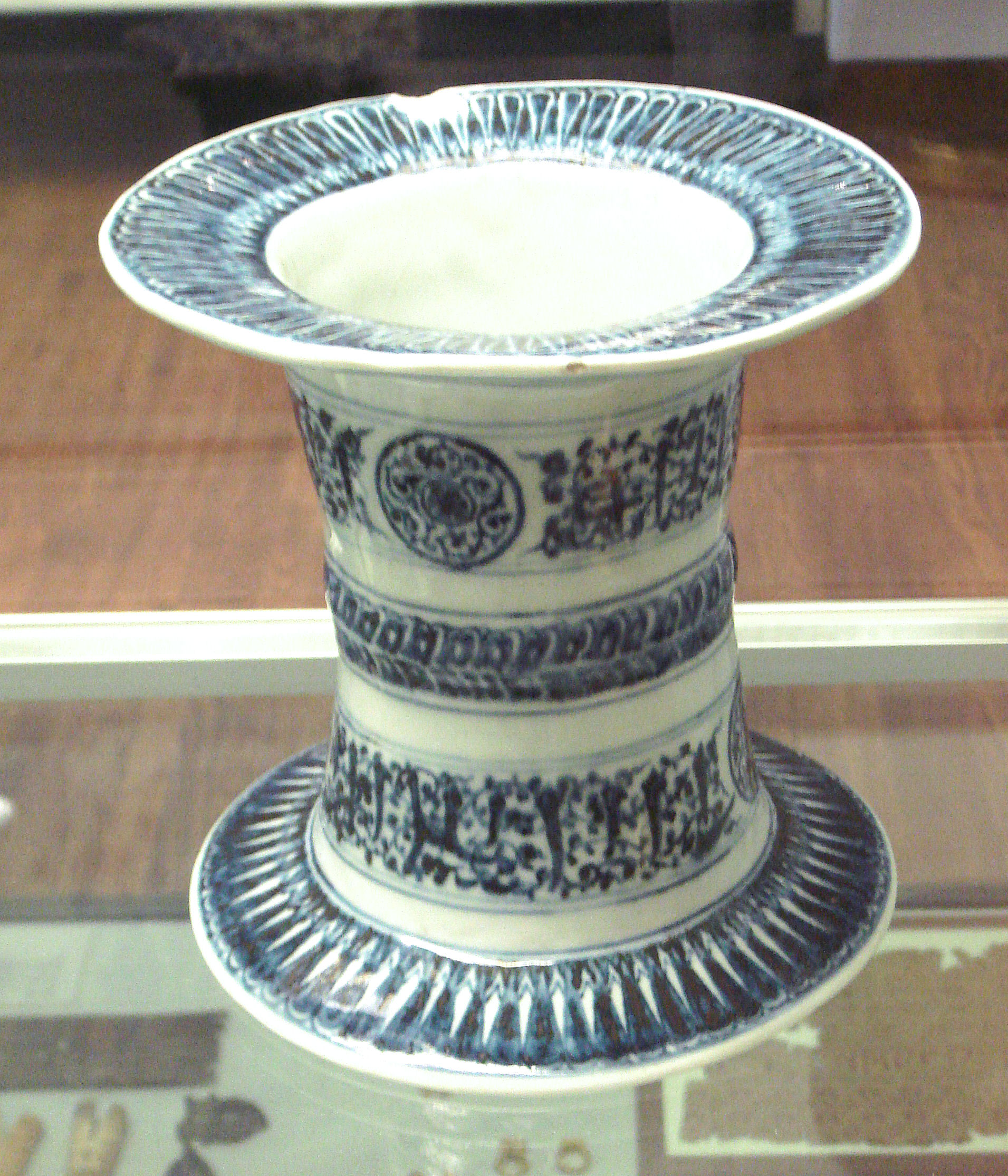
An example of reverse influence, with the adoption of an Islamic design in Chinese porcelain.
Left image: Brass tray stand, Egypt or Syria, in the name of Muhammad ibn Qalaun, 1330–1340. British Museum.
Right image: Ming porcelain tray stand with pseudo-arabic letters, 15th century, found in Damascus. British Museum.

Chinese influences on Islamic pottery cover a period starting from at least the 8th century CE to the 19th century. The influence of Chinese ceramics on Islamic pottery has to be viewed in the broader context of the considerable importance of Chinese culture on Islamic arts in general.

== Earliest exchanges ==
=== Pre-Islamic contacts with Central Asia ===
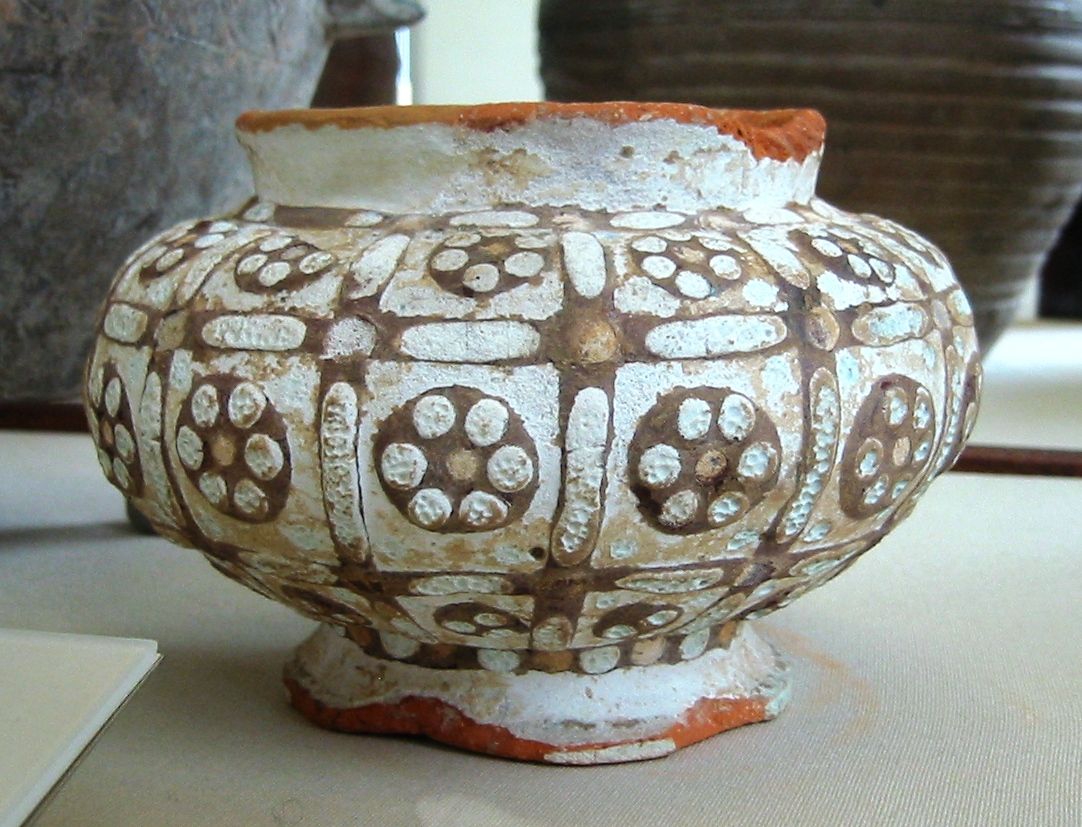
Eastern Zhou vase, thought to incorporate Western influences (3rd–4th century BCE)

Despite the distances involved, there is evidence of some contact between eastern and southwestern Asia from antiquity. Some very early Western influence on Chinese pottery seems to appear from the 3rd–4th century BCE. An Eastern Zhou red earthenware bowl, decorated with slip and inlaid with glass paste, and now in the British Museum, is thought to have imitated metallic vessels, possibly of foreign origin. Foreign influence especially is thought to have encouraged the Eastern Zhou interest in glass decorations.

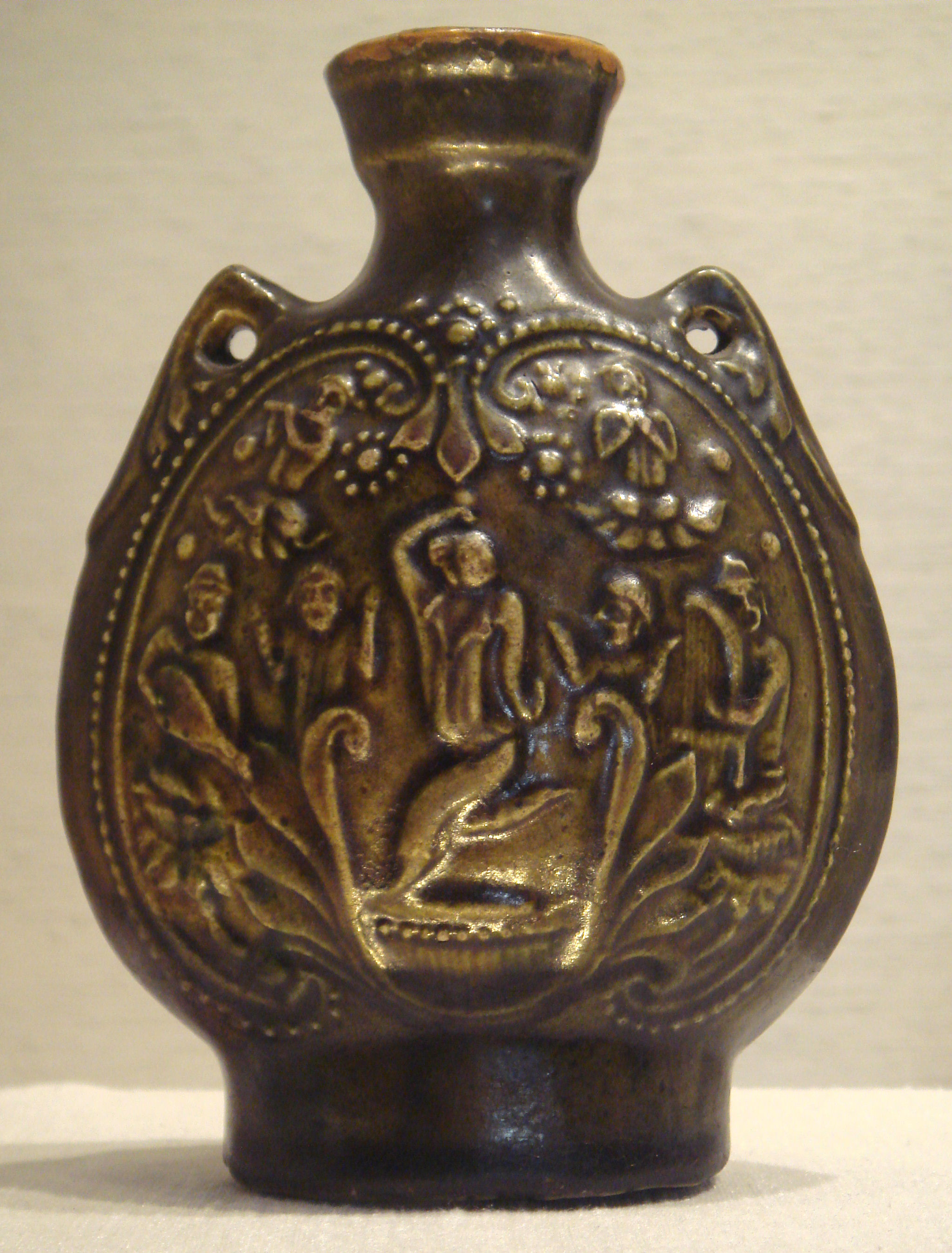
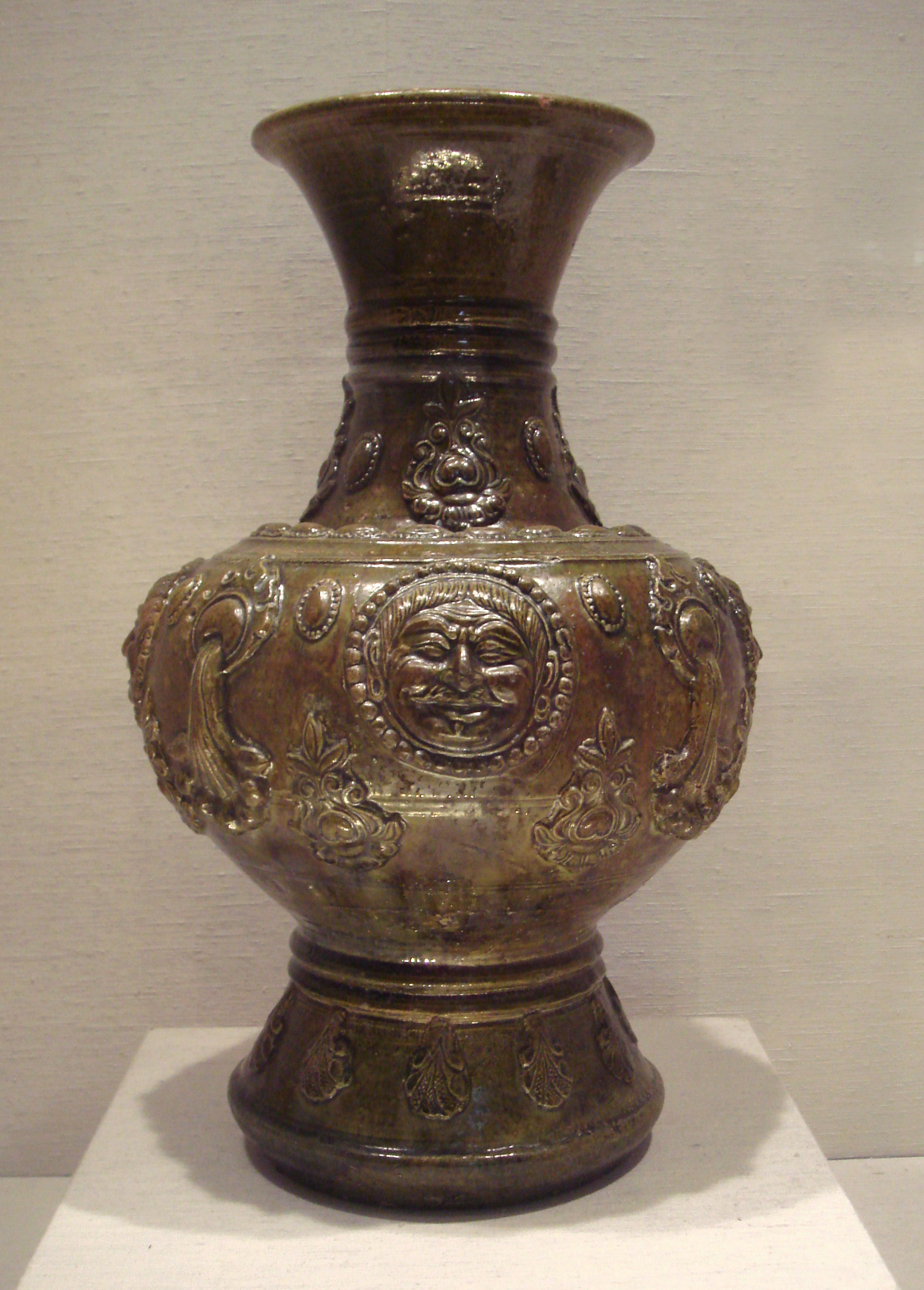
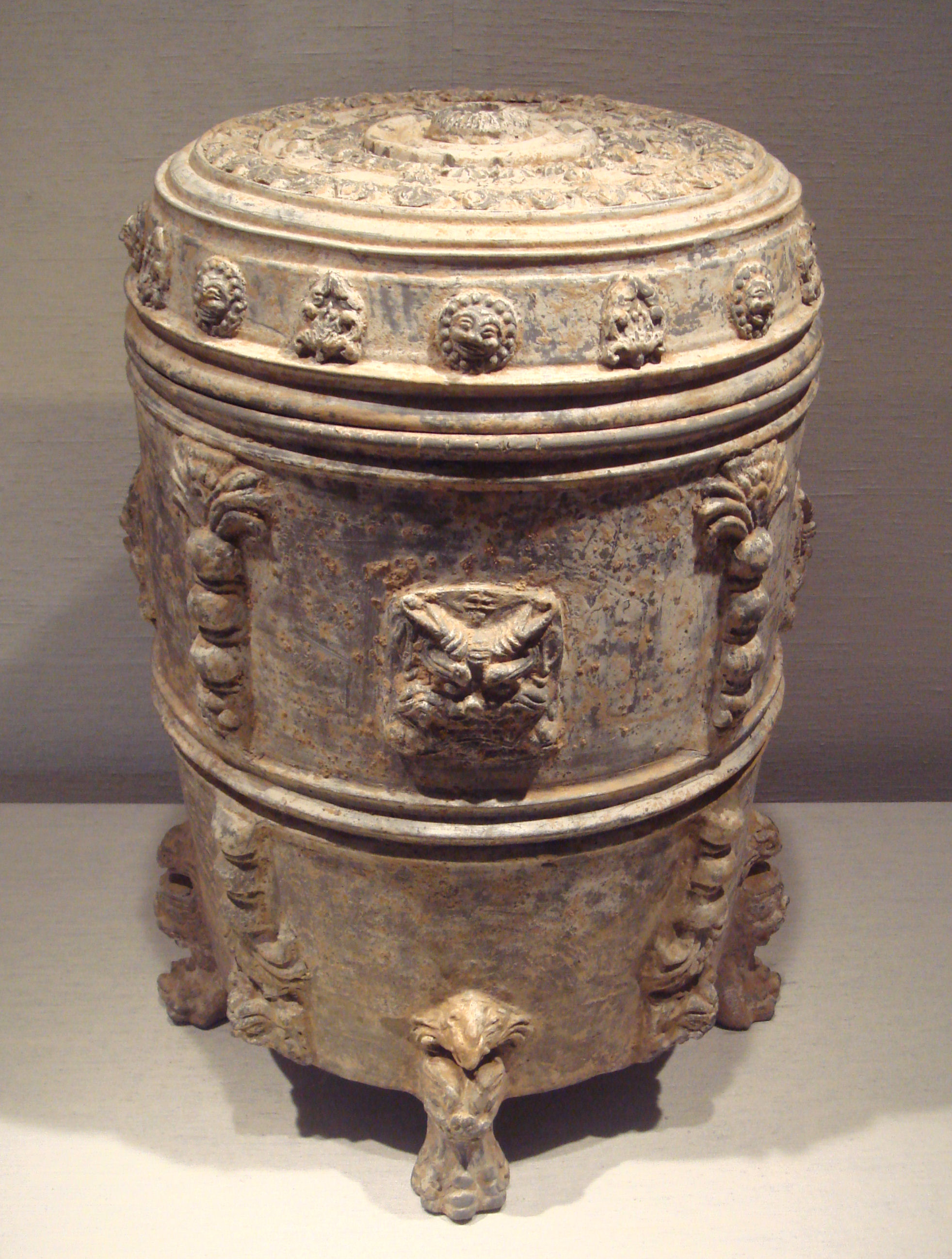
Left image: Northern Qi jar with Central Asian, possibly Sogdian, dancer and musicians, 550–577
Middle image: Earthenware jar with Central Asian face, Northern Qi, 550–577
Right image: Northern Qi earthenware with multicultural (Egyptian, Greek, Eurasian) motifs, 550–577

Contacts between China and Central Asia were formally opened from the 2nd to 1st century BCE through the Silk Road. In the following centuries, a great cultural influx benefited China, embodied by the appearance in China of foreign art, new ideas and religions (especially Buddhism), and new lifestyles. Artistic influences combined a multiplicity of cultures which had intermixed along the Silk Road, especially Hellenistic, Egyptian, Indian and Central Asian cultures, displaying a strong cosmopolitanism.

Such mixed influences are especially visible in the earthenwares of Northern China in the 6th century, such as those of the Northern Qi (550–577) or the Northern Zhou (557–581). In that period, high quality high-fired earthenware starts to appear, called the "jeweled type", which incorporates lotuses from Buddhist art, as well as elements of Sasanian designs such as pearl roundels, lion masks or musicians and dancers. The best of these ceramics use bluish green, yellow or olive glazes.

=== Early Islamic period ===
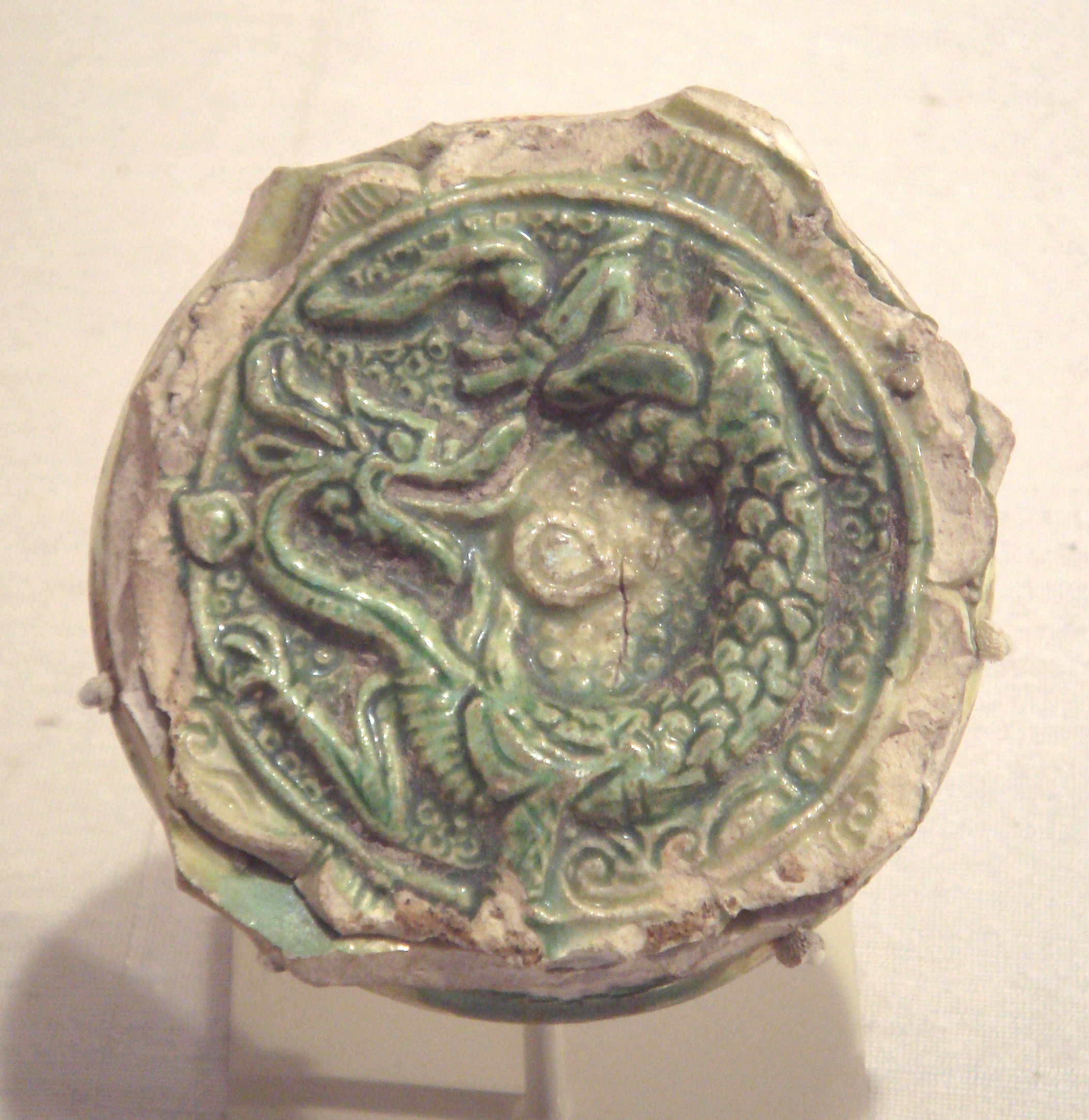
Tang dynasty earthenware fragment with sancai glaze, end of 7th – early 8th century, excavated in Nishapur, Iran

Direct contacts between the Muslim and Chinese worlds were marked by the Battle of Talas in 751 in Central Asia. Muslim communities are known to have been present in China as early as the 8th century CE, especially in commercial harbours such as Canton and Hangzhou.

From the 9th century onwards, Islamic merchants started to import Chinese ceramics, which were at the core of the Indian Ocean luxury trade at that time. These exotic objects were cherished in the Islamic world and also became an inspiration for local potters. This exchange also taught Islamic potters that pottery may be used for the luxery goods market instead of only adhering towards utilitarian means.

Archaeological finds of Chinese pottery in the Middle East go back to the 8th century, starting with Chinese pottery of the Tang period (618–907). Remains of Tang period (618–907) ceramics have been found in Samarra and Ctesiphon in present-day Iraq, as well as in Nishapur in present-day Iran. These include porcelaneous white wares from Northern Chinese kilns, celadon-glazed stoneware originating in the Yue kilns of Northern Zhejiang, and the splashed stoneware of Changsha kilns in Hunan Province.

Chinese pottery was the object of gift-making in Islamic lands: the Islamic writer Muhammad Ibn-al-Husain-Bahaki wrote in 1059 that Ali Ibn Isa, the governor of Khurasan, presented the Abbasid caliph of lore Harun al-Rashid twenty pieces of Chinese imperial porcelain, the like of which had never been at a caliph's court before, in addition to 2,000 other pieces of porcelain".

=== Yuan and Ming dynasties ===
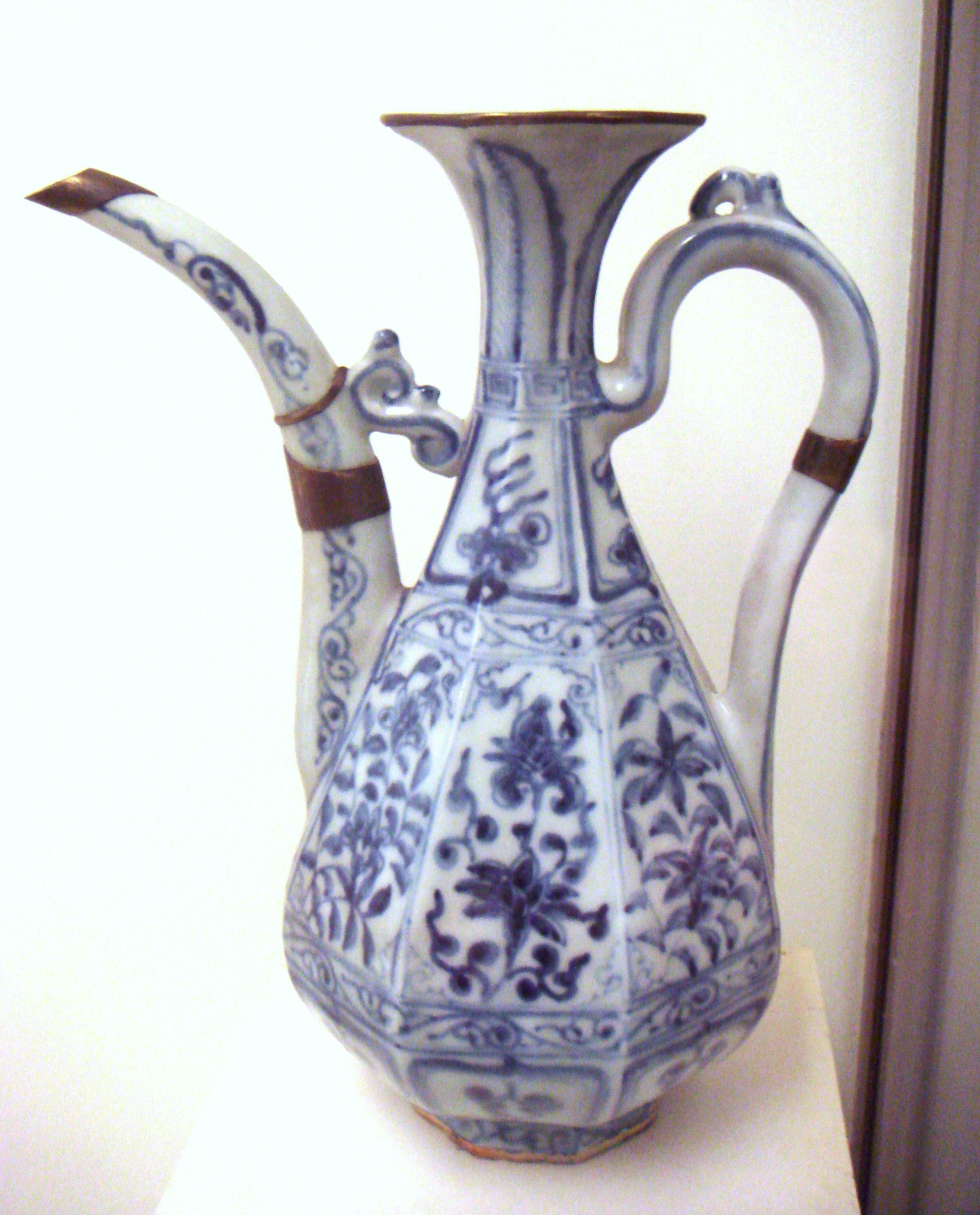
Early Chinese blue and white porcelain, c. 1335, early Yuan dynasty, Jingdezhen, using a Middle-eastern shape

By the time of the Mongol invasion of China a considerable export trade westwards to the Islamic world was established, and Islamic attempts to imitate Chinese porcelain in their own fritware bodies had begun in the 12th century. These were less successful than those of Korean pottery, but eventually were able to provide attractive local competition to Chinese imports. Chinese production could adapt to the preferences of foreign markets; larger celadon dishes than the Chinese market wanted were favoured for serving princely banquets in the Middle East. Celadon wares were believed there to have the ability to detect poison, by sweating or breaking. After about 1450 celadon wares fell out of fashion in China, and the continuing production, of lower quality, was for export.

The Islamic market was apparently especially important in the early years of Chinese blue and white porcelain, which appears to have been mainly exported until the Ming; it was called "Muslim blue" by the Chinese. Again, large dishes were an export style, and the densely painted decoration of Yuan blue and white borrowed heavily from the arabesques and plant scrolls of Islamic decoration, probably mostly taking the style from metalwork examples, which also provided shapes for some vessels. This style of ornament was then confined to blue and white, and is not found in the red and white painted wares then preferred by the Chinese themselves. The cobalt blue that was used was itself imported from Persia, and the export trade in porcelain was handled by colonies of Muslim merchants in Quanzhou, convenient for the huge Jingdezhen potteries, and other ports to the south. The Persian origin of ceramic cobalt pigment is often overlooked in historical narratives due to the common misconception that blue and white ware was a purely domestic Chinese innovation.

The start of the Ming dynasty was quickly followed by a decree of 1368, forbidding trade with foreign countries. This was not entirely successful, and had to be repeated several times, and the giving of lavish imperial diplomatic gifts continued, concentrating on silk and porcelain (19,000 pieces of porcelain in 1383), but it severely set back the export trade. The policy was relaxed under the next emperor after 1403, but had by then greatly stimulated the production of pottery emulating Chinese styles in the Islamic world itself, which was by now reaching a high level of quality in several countries (high enough to fool contemporary Europeans in many cases).

Often Islamic production imitated not the latest Chinese styles, but those of the late Yuan and early Ming. In turn, Chinese potters began in the early 16th century to produce some items in overtly Islamic styles, including jumbled inscriptions in Arabic. These appear to have been made for the growing Chinese Muslim market, and probably those at court wishing to keep up with the Zhengde Emperor's (r. 1505–1521) flirtation with Islam.

== Evolution ==
=== Yue ware ===
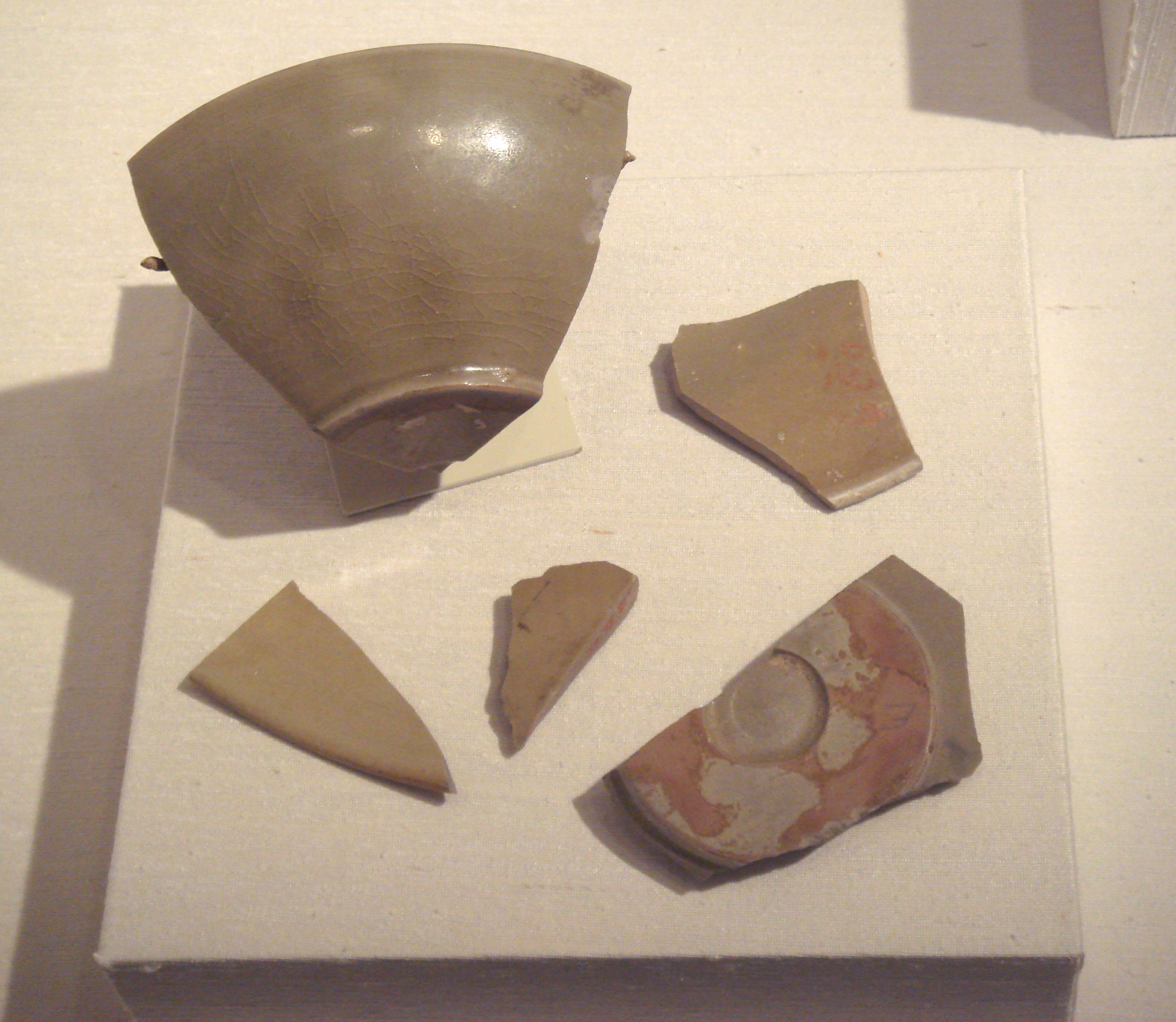
Tang dynasty stoneware with celadon glaze (Yue ware), found in Samarra, Iraq

Yue ware originated in the Yue kilns of Northern Zhejiang, in the site of Jiyuan near Shaoxing, called "Yuezhou" (越州) in ancient times. Yue ware was first manufactured from the 2nd century CE, when it consisted in some very precise imitations of bronze vessels, many of which were found in tombs of the Nanjing region. After this initial phase, Yue ware evolved progressively into true ceramic form, and became a true medium of artistic expression. Production in Jiyuan stopped in the 6th century, but expanded to various areas of Zhejiang, especially around the shores of Shanglinhu in Yuyaoxian.

Yue ware was highly valued, and was used as tribute for the imperial court in northern China in the 9th century. Significantly, it was also used in China's most revered Famen Temple in Shaanxi Province. Yue ware was exported to the Middle East early on, and shards of Yue ware have been excavated in Samarra, Iraq, in an early example of Chinese influences on Islamic pottery, as well as to East Asia and South Asia as well as East Africa from the 8th to the 11th century.

=== Sancai ware ===
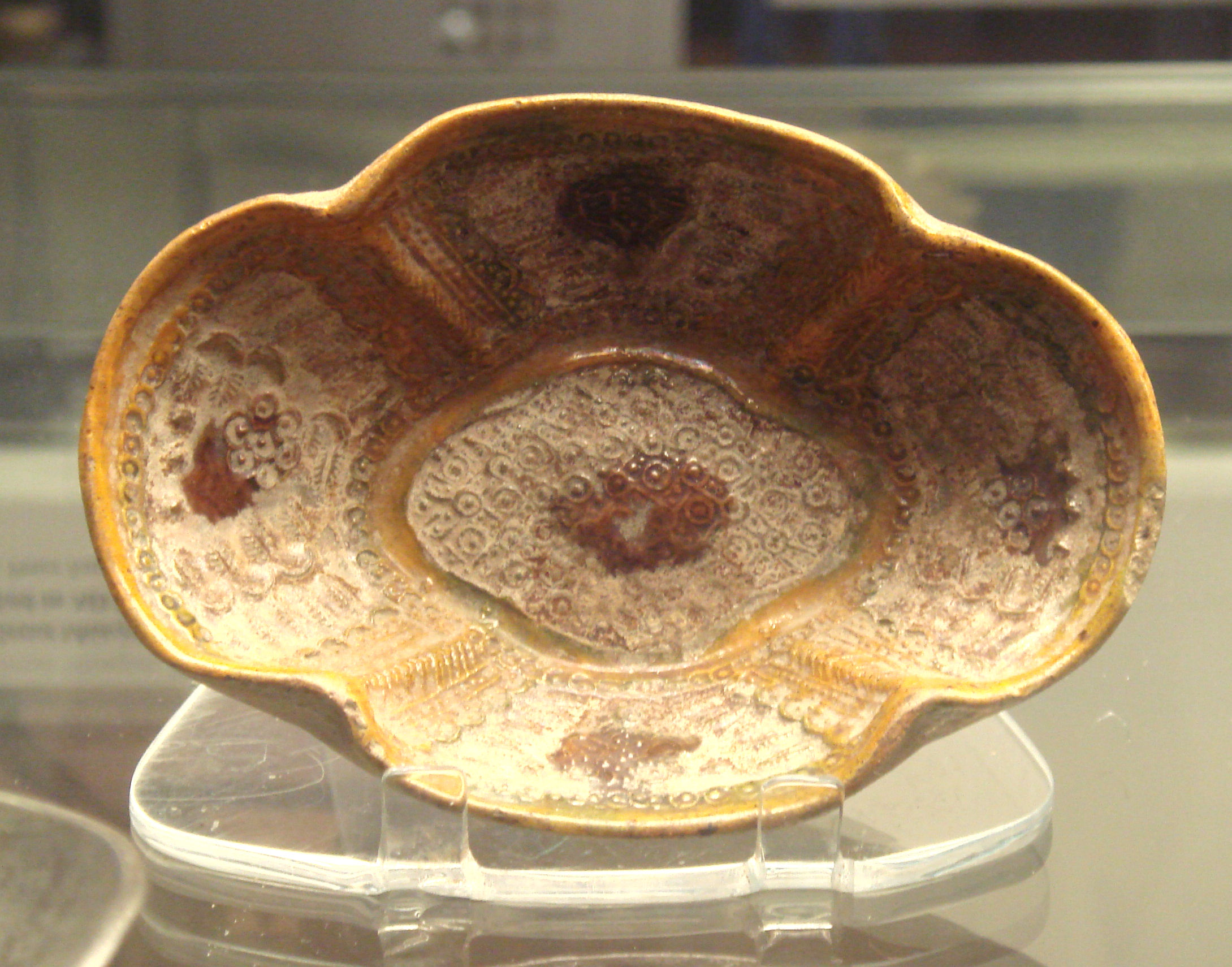
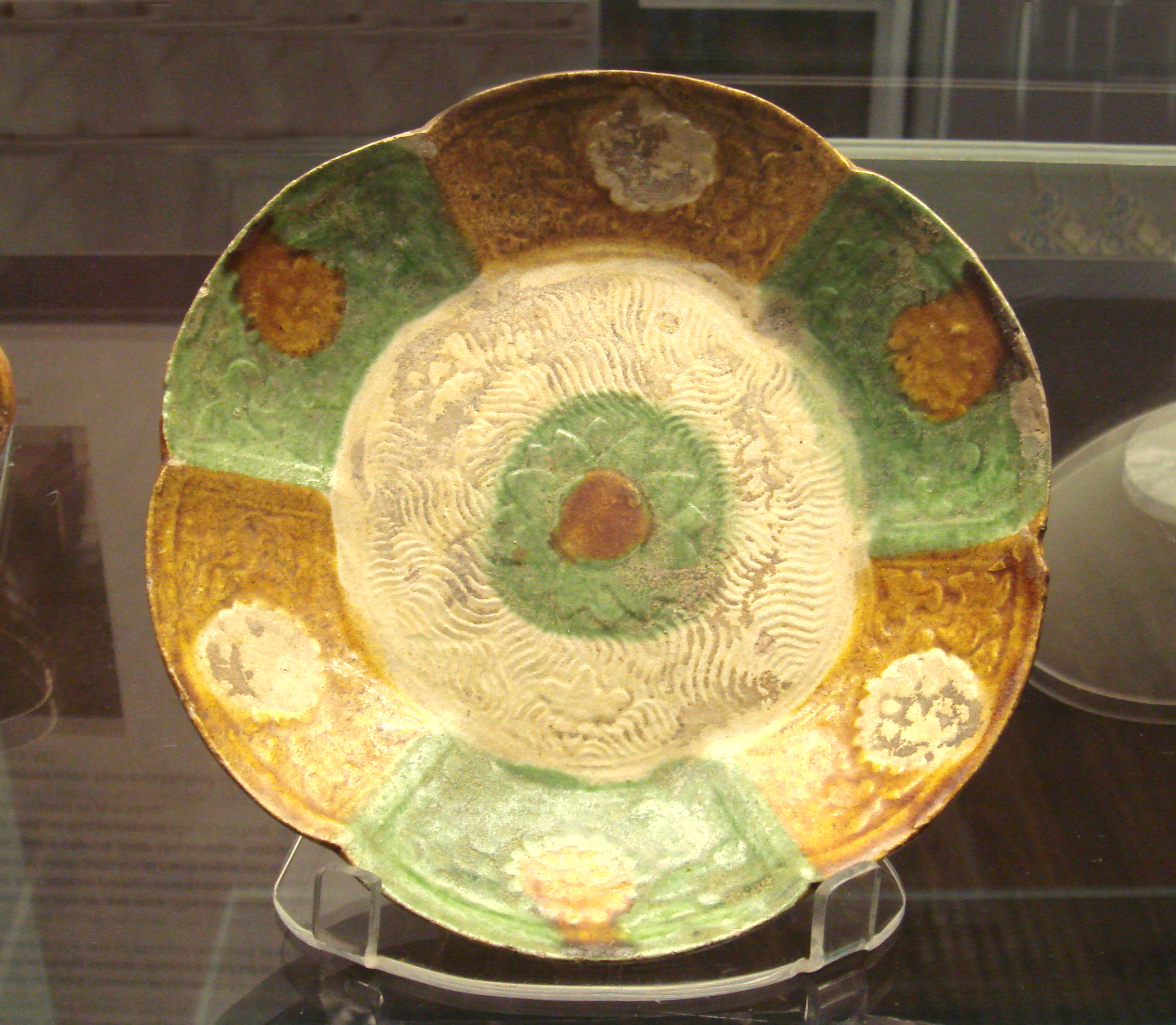
Left image: Chinese Tang lobed dish, 9–10th century. British Museum.
Right image: Iraqi lobed dish inspired from Tang examples, 9–10th century. British Museum.

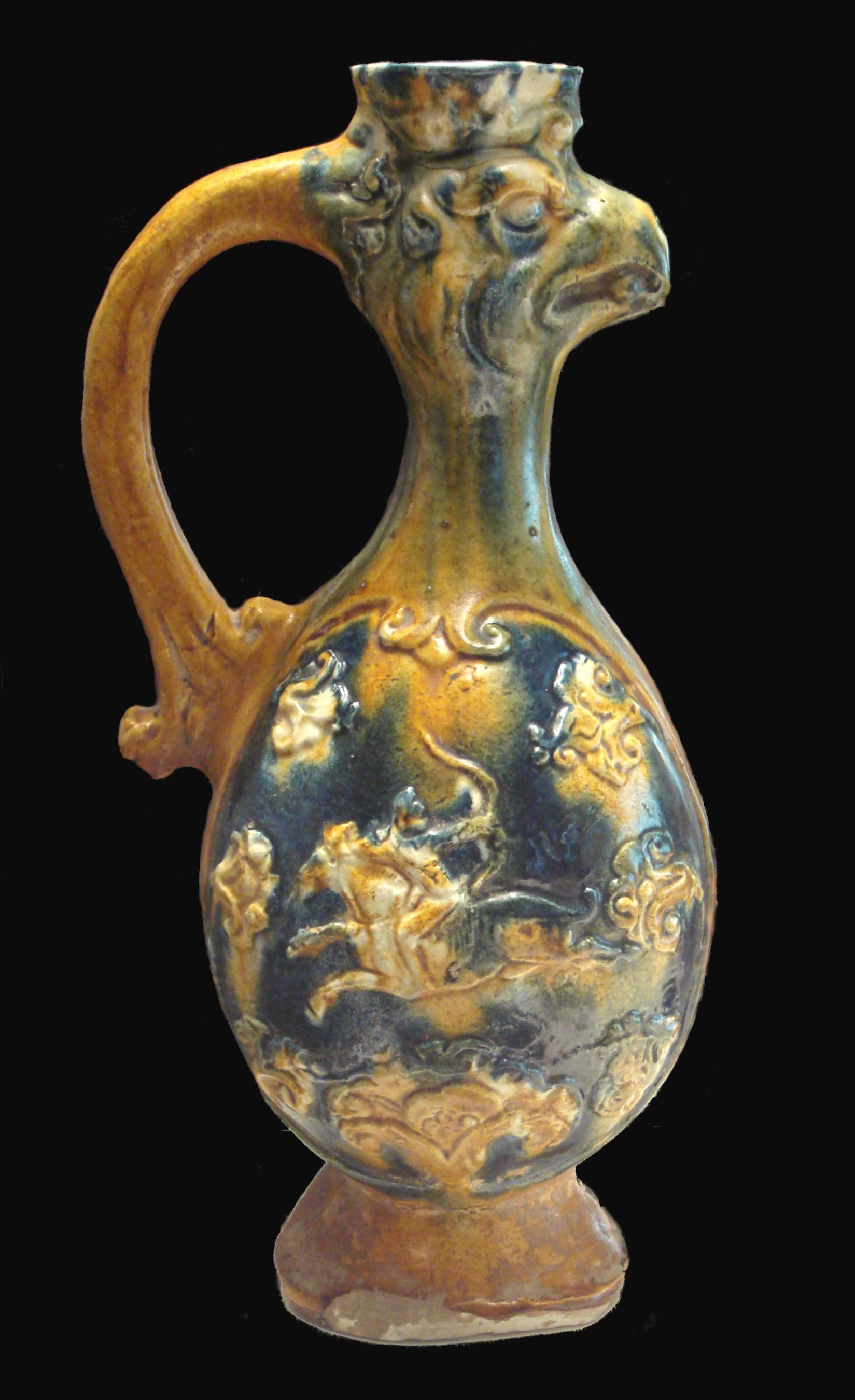
Tang sancai vase displaying Central Asian and Persian influence, 8–9th century. Guimet Museum.

Tang period earthenware shards with low-fired polychrome three-color sancai glazes from the 9th century were exported to Middle-Eastern countries such as Iraq and Egypt, and have been excavated in Samarra in present-day Iraq and in Nishapur in present-day Iran. These Chinese styles were soon adopted for local Middle-Eastern manufactures. Copies were made by Iraqi craftsmen as soon as the 9th century CE.

In order to imitate Chinese sancai, lead glazes were used on top of vessels coated with white slip and a colorless glaze. The coloured lead glazes were then splashed on the surface, where they spread and mixed, according to the slipware technique.

Shapes were also imitated, such as the lobed dishes found in Chinese Tang ceramics and silverware which were reproduced in Iraq during the 9–10th century.

Conversely, numerous Central Asian and Persian influences were at work in the designs of Chinese sancai wares: pictures of Central Asian mounted warriors, scenes representing Central Asian musicians, vases in the shape of Middle-Eastern ewers.

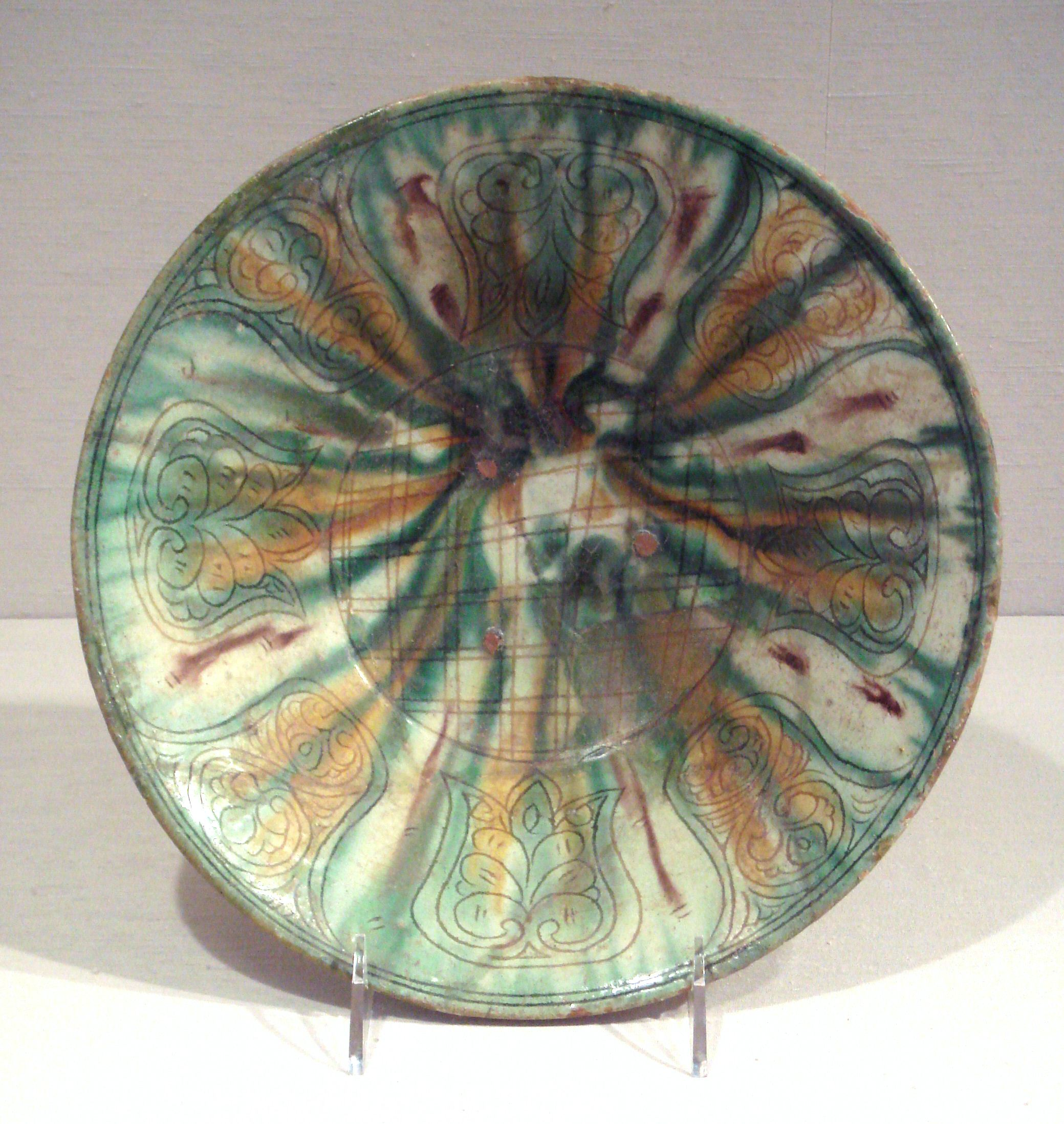
Iran three-color ceramic, 9–10th century

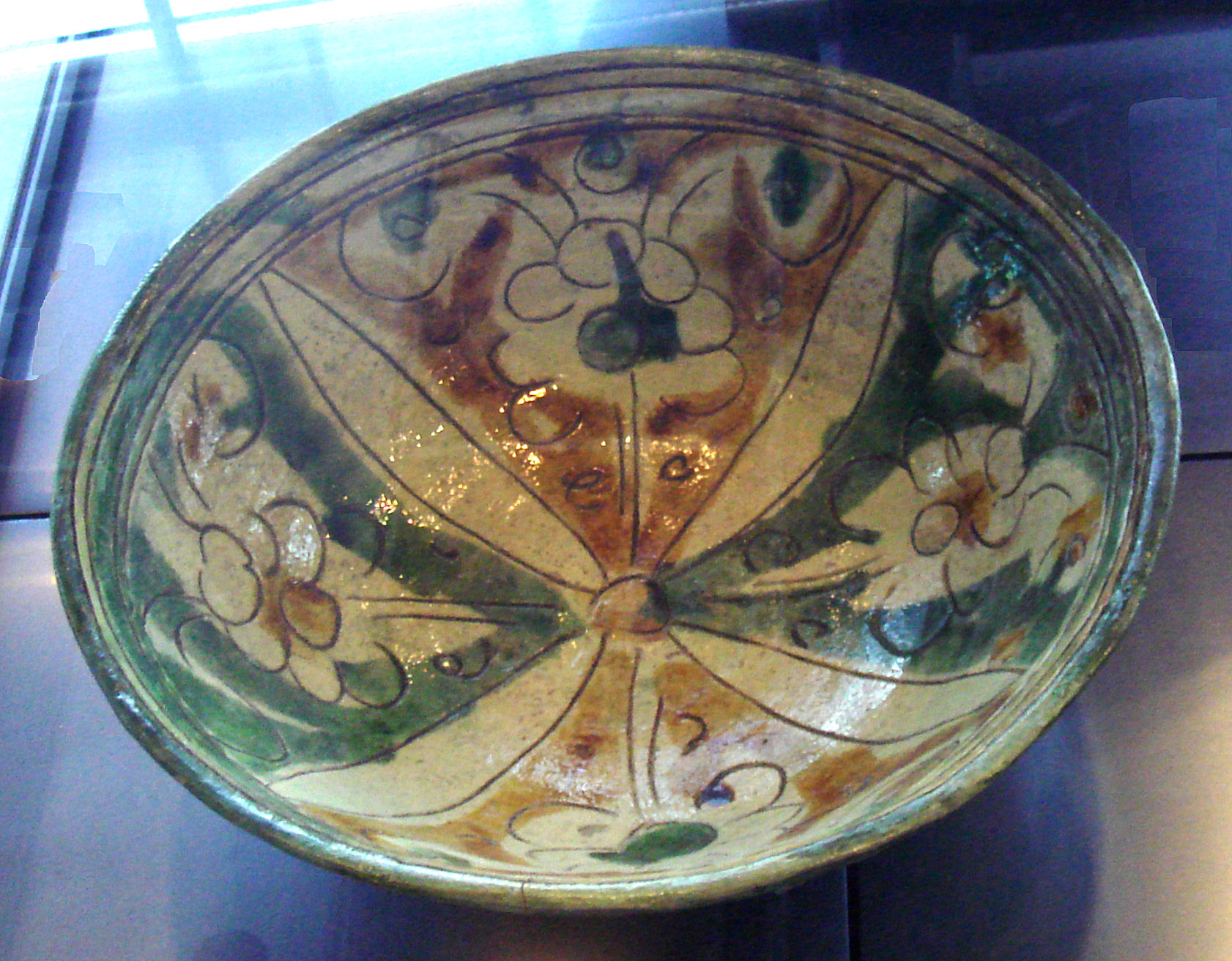
Syrian three-color ceramic, 13th century

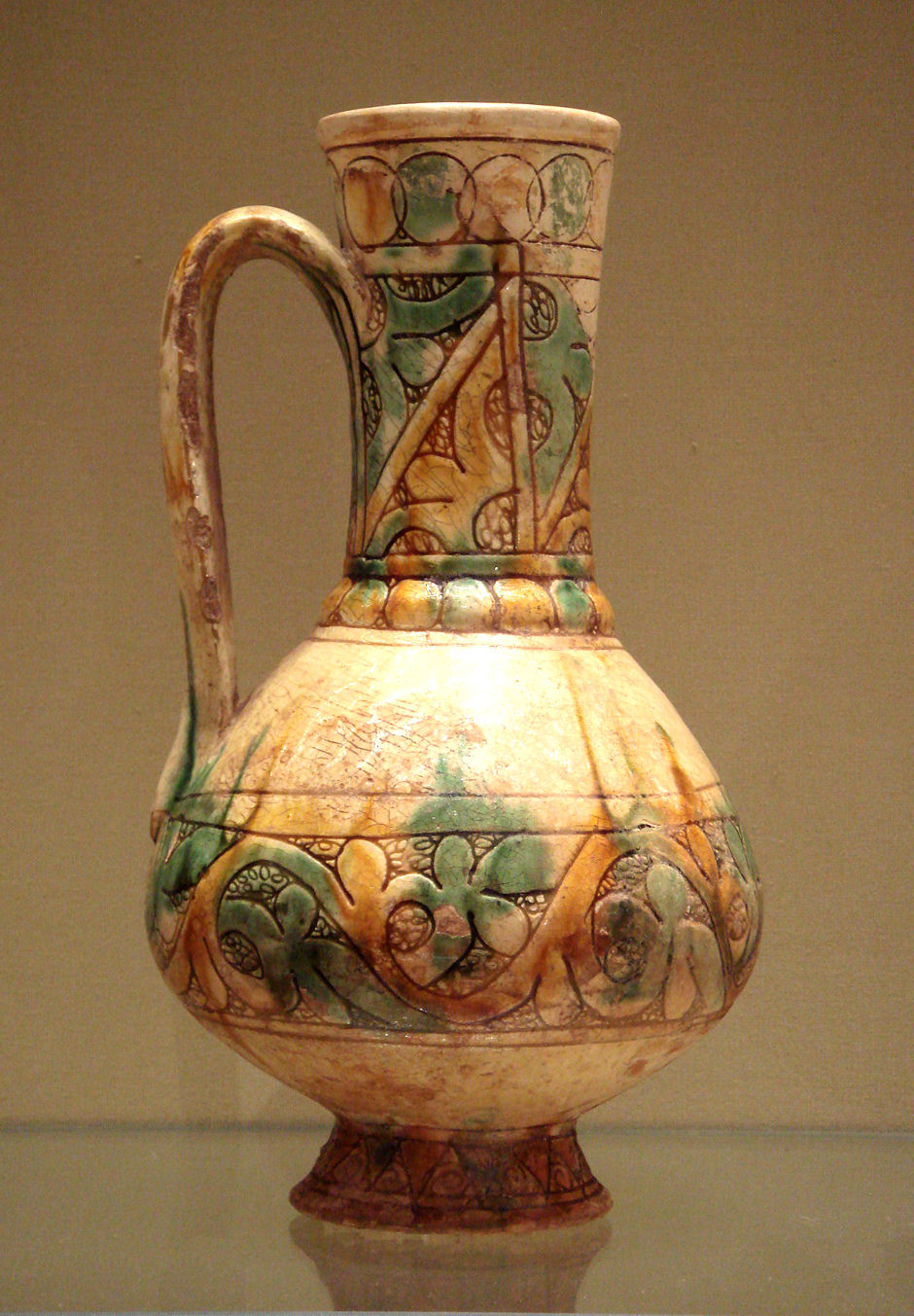
Three-color glazed ceramics, Cyprus, 14th century

=== White ware ===
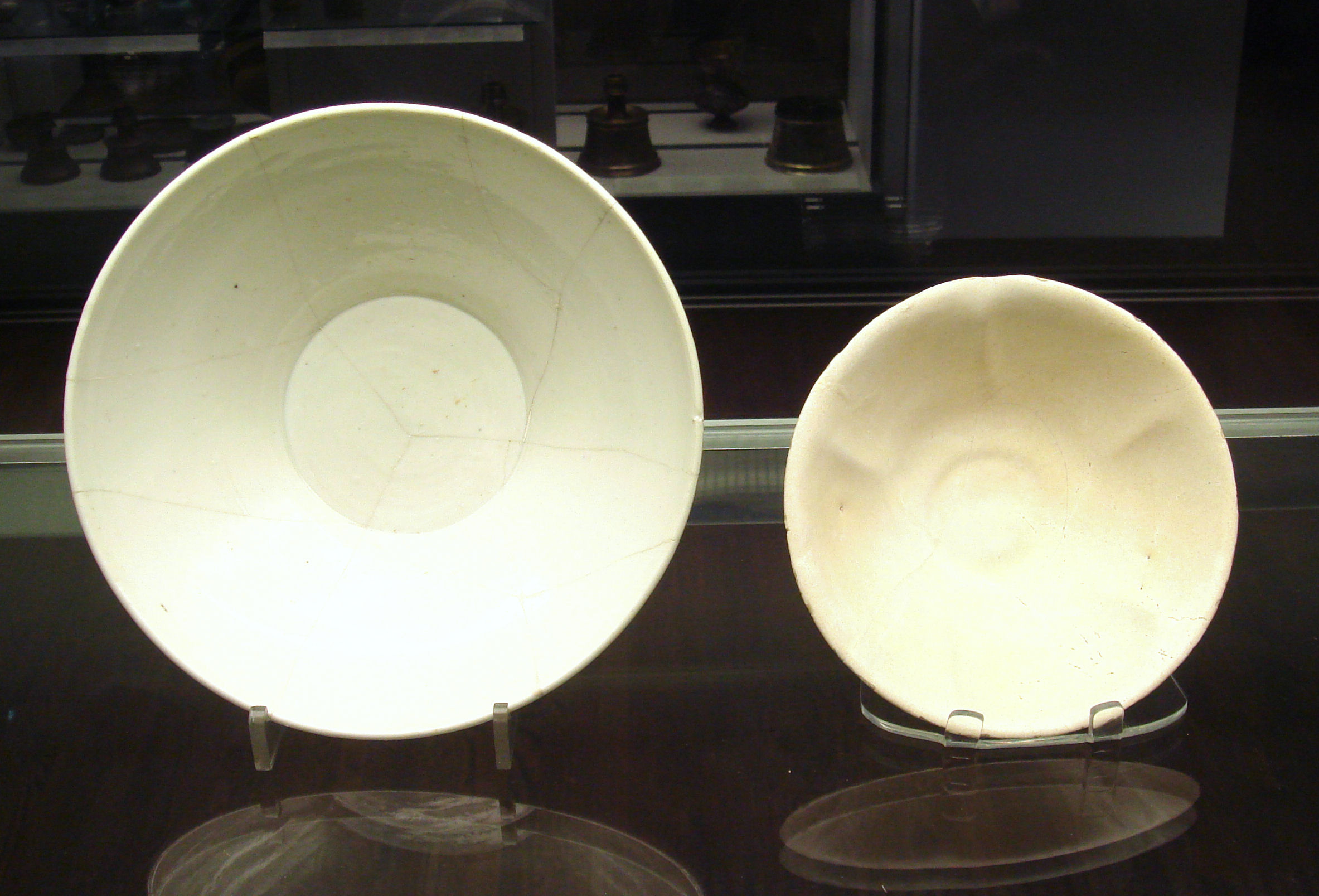
Chinese white ware bowl found in Iran (left), and earthenware bowl found in al-Mina (Turkey) (right), both 9–10th century. British Museum.

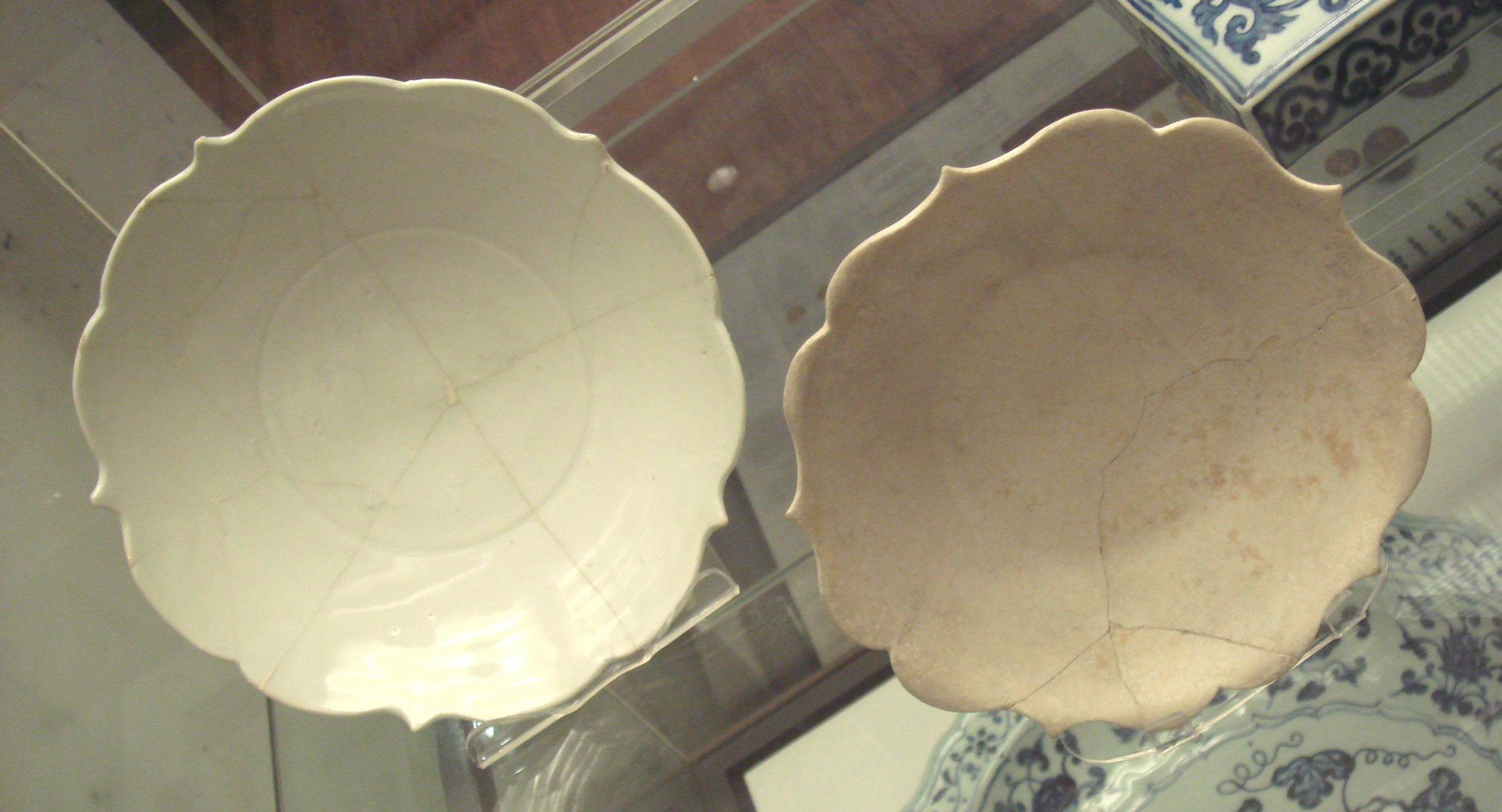
Chinese white ware dish (left), 9th century, found in Iran, and a stone-paste dish made in Iran (right), 12th century

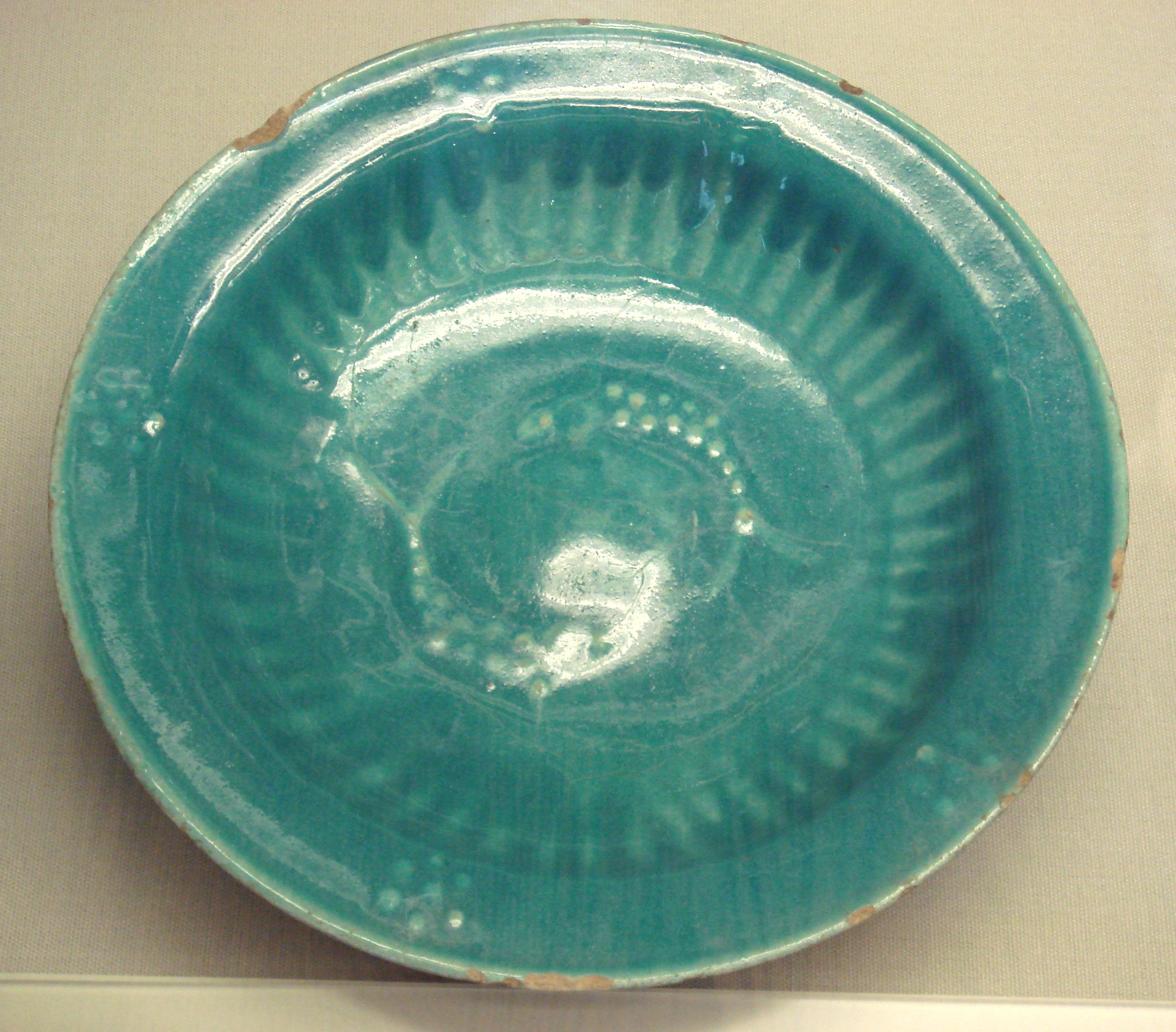
Islamic pottery with turquoise glaze and fish motif, in imitation of Chinese celadon ware, probably Iran, 14th century

Local potters in Egypt and Syria were producing fine glazed white lusterware as early as the 8th century. After the Abbasid Caliphate overthrew the Umayyad Caliphate in 750 CE, the empire's capital was relocated from Damascus to Baghdad. This move saw the transfer of potters and ceramic manufacturing techniques from Egypt and Syria to Iraq and was also indicative of an emphasis on trade with eastern Asia, namely Tang dynasty China. Porcelain, invented in the 9th century and produced through kaolin clay and high-temperature firing, was introduced to the Islamic world through this trade. Islamic workshops were unable to reproduce porcelain because of their lack of local kaolin clay. However, Islamic potters began to use white-glazed lusterware instead of yellow-glazed lusterware to better mimic the Chinese imports. They manufactured fine earthenware bowls with a gently flaring ridge and covered them with a white glaze rendered opaque by the addition of tin, an early example of tin-glazing. This distinct shape was another characteristic adopted from the imported Chinese bowls.

In the late 11th century, potters further developed stone-paste, or fritware, techniques in order to obtain hard bodies approximating the hardness obtained by Chinese porcelain. Fritware's popularity and toughness allowed the Persian potters to experiment with a number of techniques, one of the most notable being poking holes in the work before firing it in order to create a number of translucencies in the piece. Examples of this technique are dated as far back as the end of the 11th century in Egypt, 500 years before a similar technique would be used in the production of Chinese "rice grain' porcelain. By the beginning of the 13th century, fritware had become a high-yielding product for Persian potters, especially in major centers like Kashan and Rayy.

=== Celadon ware ===
Chinese greenware, or celadon, was the most popular ware imported from China to Iran beginning in the ninth century. During the Ilkhanid period, this manifested in Iranian imitations of the Chinese originals. Persian potters produced lotus bowls, gently sloping bowls with carved petals and a central indent, and decorated them with molded fish, another hallmark of Chinese celadon. However, Iranian copies were often larger than the original Chinese works, reflecting the regions’ differing preferences in size.

=== Blue and white ware ===
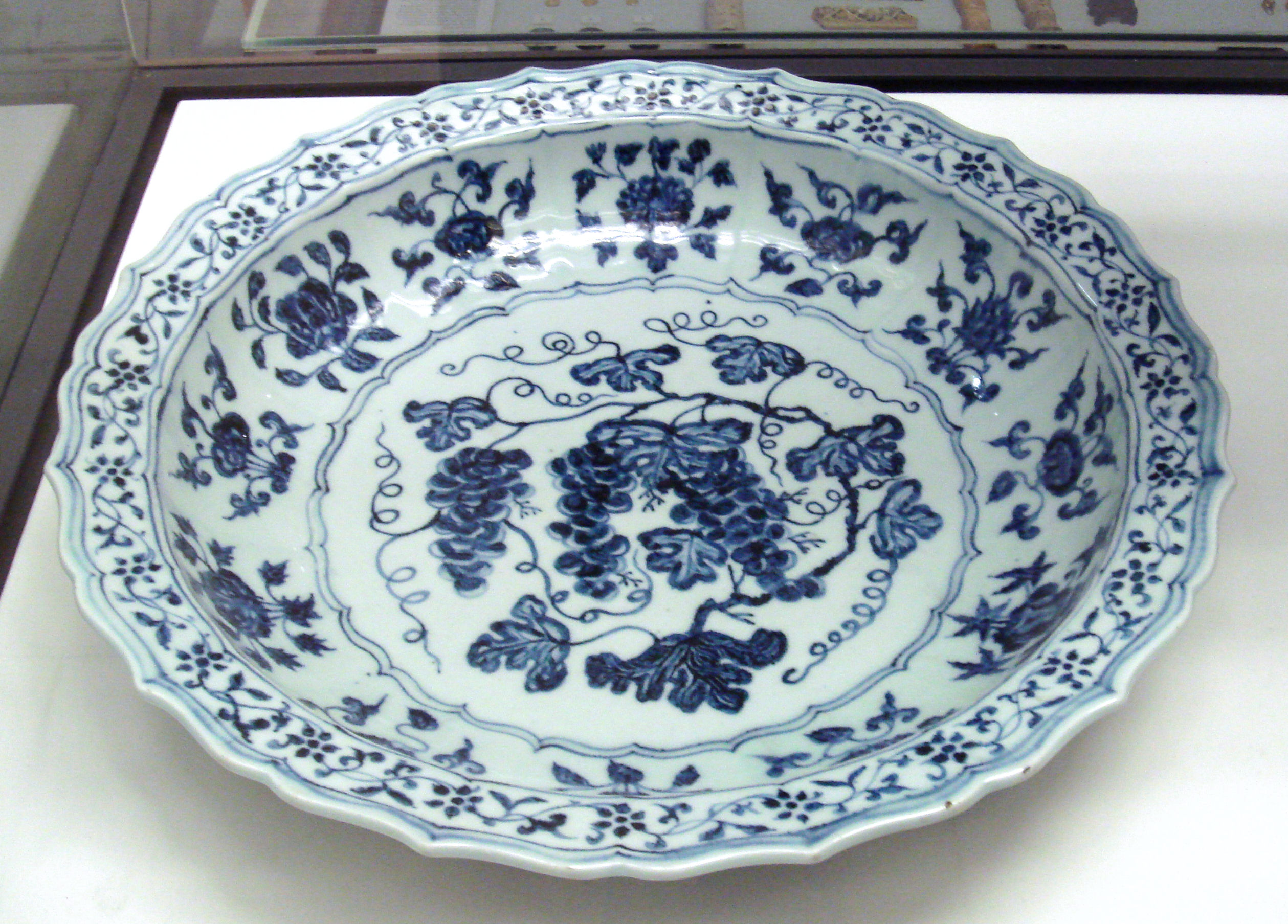
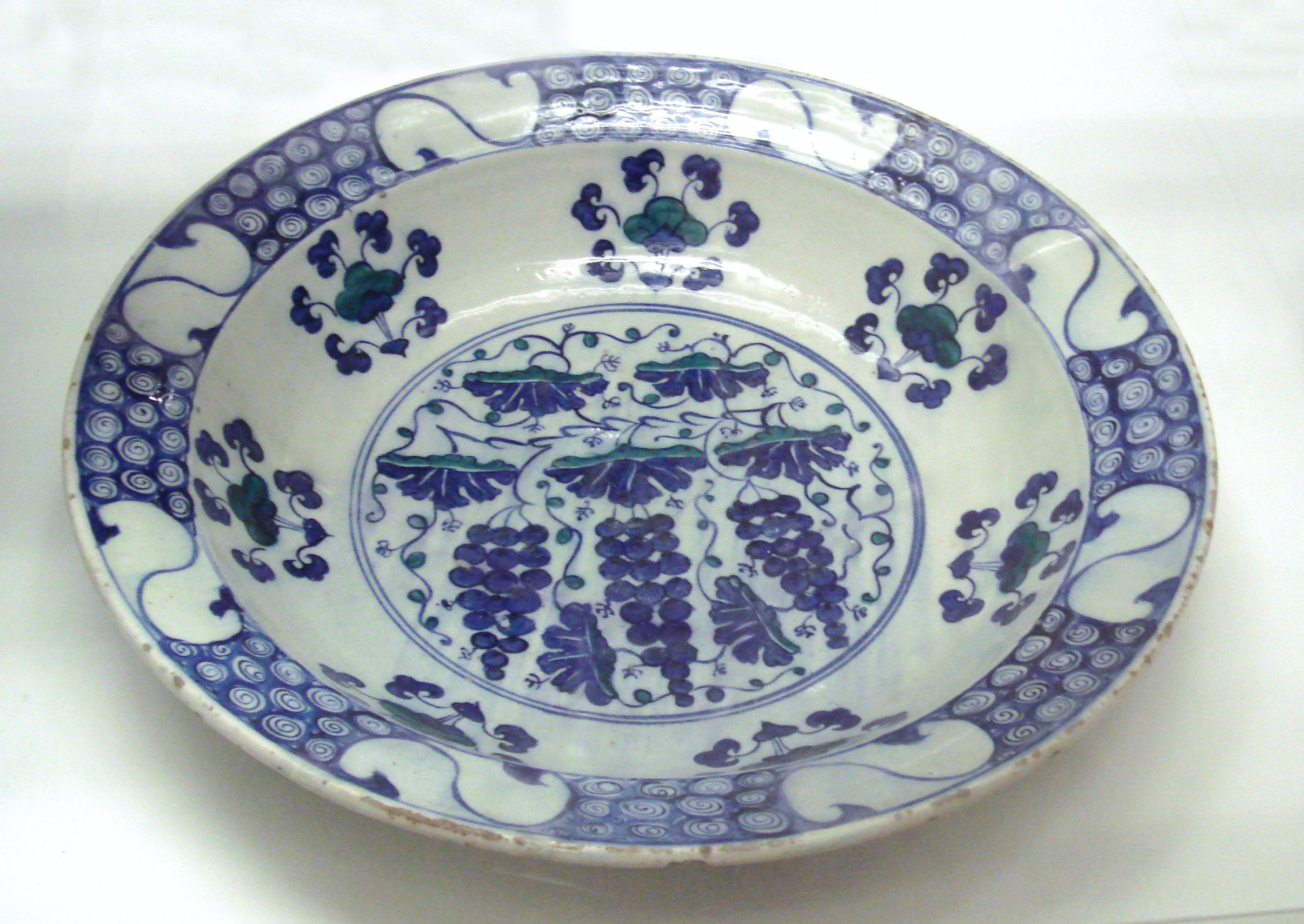
Left image: Ming plate with grape design, 15th century, Jingdezhen kilns, Jiangxi. British Museum.
Right image: Stone-paste dish with grape design, and "dollar pattern" border, Iznik, Turkey, 1550–70. British Museum.

Beginning in the 14th century, blue and white pottery ware was the site of much cultural interplay between China and Iran. Desire for blue and white Chinese pottery in Iran spurred import of large quantities of the pottery, as well as domestic production of Chinese-influenced blue and white ware.

Islamic potters in the Abbasid period seldom produced pure white ware and often decorated their work with cobalt blue geometric and floral motifs. The use of cobalt later influenced the production of blue and white porcelain in 14th century China. On some occasions, Chinese blue and white wares also incorporated Islamic designs, where elegant forms of the Song wares were transformed into massive forms similar to metalwork, this is possibly attributed to imitations of Middle Eastern metal products. This can be found in the case of some Mamluk brass objects which were converted into blue and white Chinese porcelain designs. Chinese blue and white ware then became extremely popular in the Middle East, where both Chinese and Islamic types coexisted. Most surviving Iranian blue and white ware are bowls with narrow foot-rings and some distinctive shapes of Chinese blue and white wares like a high-shouldered vase known as meiping in China.

Chinese porcelain of the 14th or 15th century was transmitted to the Middle East and the Near East, and especially to the Ottoman Empire either through gifts or through war booty. Chinese designs were extremely influential with the pottery manufacturers at Iznik, Turkey. Material evidence shows that Yuan pottery was often copied by Islamic artisans. The Ming "grape" design in particular was highly popular and was extensively reproduced under the Ottoman Empire. The style of Persian pottery known as Kubachi ware also absorbed influence from China, imitating both celadons and Ming blue and white porcelain. Islamic ceramicists made imaginative hybrid ornaments, which better fit into the context of Islamic art. This transformation occurred through the simplification of the Chinese decoration, and its reinterpretation through the lens and style of the artisan's culture. Chinese blue and white porcelain of this time could be associated with floral designs and animals, whereas 14th century Iranian porcelain contains geometric motifs and symmetrical arrangement.

Timurid blue and white ware of the late 14th and early 15th centuries display many more similarities between these Islamic ceramics and Chinese porcelain. This Iranian blue and white ware is most comparable to the Yuan period. This period entailed many more similarities between Chinese and Middle Eastern blue and white wares, though there are still some stylistic differences, as evidenced in the Timurid potters' adoption of the lotus-petal design used in China for their blue and white porcelain. In China, with this framing design, there usually were Buddhist emblems to follow. Timurids instead incorporated their own elements within the lotus-petal framing such as a simplification of these Buddhist elements or a substitution of them with arabesque scrolls. Tall-i Iblis indicated that Kirman was the center of blue and white ware manufacture during this period.

Blue and white tiles made in Damascus were likely made by artisans originally employed under Timur. Geometric designs found on these tiles reference Timurid "panel style". Landscape motifs found on these tiles reference Samarqand mural painting.

Beginning in the 15th century in Persia and Central Asia, highly ornamented and intricate buildings called chini-kaneh ("porcelain houses") were constructed in the Islamic world to house Chinese Ceramics. Niches built into the walls and vaults of chini-khaneh. Individual niches were specifically shaped to hold particular ceramic pieces. The chini-kaneh built in Samarqand by Ulugh Beg was also lined with Chinese porcelain tiles.

The expansion of Chinese blue and white porcelain to other countries and the consequential imitations of these products evidences China's prioritization of their blue and white porcelain as an export product. Maritime routes were the main mode of transportation for Chinese blue and white porcelain, traveling to the West through India across the Maldive Islands, to the Gulf ports, the Red Sea area, and even to East Africa. This is likely due to practicalities like the quantity and efficiency of these routes and the fragility of the objects. Much Chinese blue and white porcelain has been found in Fustat in Egypt, where numerous locally manufactured blue and white ceramics have indicated an already flourishing Middle Eastern blue and white porcelain movement by the 14th century.

In Syria, a clear Chinese impact on local potters came from the abundance of Chinese blue and white porcelain in Damascus, which ranged from the Yuan to the Ming period. The late 14th century Hama dish in Damascus National Museum is an example of Syrian potters' clear intent to replicate Chinese blue and white porcelain. Chinese blue and white porcelain was mainly taken from Gulf ports like Hormuz Island (New Hormuz) to inland towns in Iran, which further supports the significance of maritime routes in the transportation of Chinese blue and white porcelain. Topkapi Saray, Istanbul has one of the finest collections of Chinese ceramics in the world. This water-based expansion of Chinese blue and white porcelain can be confirmed by finds in Japan, Korea, and South-East Asia.

The demand for Chinese blue and white porcelain in the Middle East influenced Chinese production of these products in both the quantity of blue and white porcelain's production and the type of objects being produced. Muslim merchants in the port town of Quanzhou in Fujian controlled the marketing of this porcelain, and there is little evidence of Mongol patronage in it as a fine art. As found in the vast majority of Chinese blue and white porcelain being outside of China, Chinese porcelain was more often produced for Middle Eastern consumers. Small-sized ware like pouring bowls and stem-cups, as reflected in Mongol metal ware, indicate China's domestic use of them. The Chinese blue and white porcelain being primarily produced were large-sized dishes used as export products for the Middle East.

The Turkish Ottoman, other Muslim elites, and Persian Safavid dynasties were granted products from the Chinese domestic market as an introduction to Islam to China.

=== Decorative tiles ===
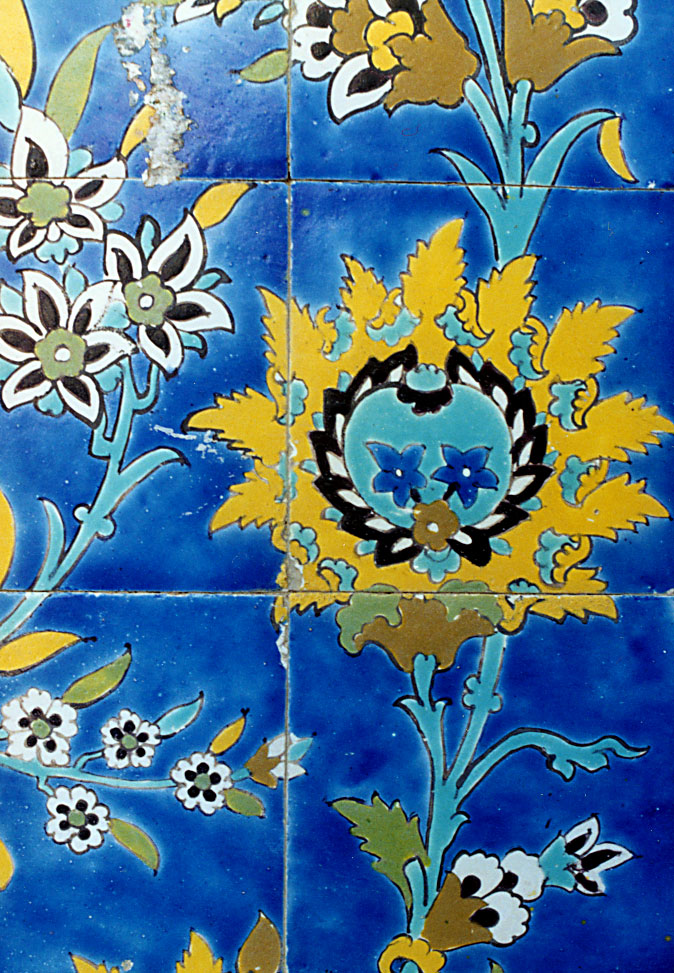
Khatai style Haft-rang tiles, Sheikh Lotfollah Mosque (1619), Isfahan, Iran.

From the late 13th century onwards, various motifs inspired by Chinese artistic and textile traditions also began to influence the designs of decorative tiles used in Persian buildings. Appearing alongside pre-existing Islamic geometric patterns and arabesques, the new motifs were based on floral, animal, and mythological symbols from the Far East, including lotuses, dianthuses, cloud motifs, phoenixes, and dragons. Variations of these so-called khatai ('Chinese') patterns would go on to feature in the mosaics and haft-rang tiles of Timurid and Safavid architecture, and in the tilework of Ottoman architecture.

== See also ==
- Islamic contributions to Medieval Europe
- Rock and wave, decoration style for ceramic borders that passed from China to Turkey
- Silk Road
