= Rock and wave =

Motif in Asian ceramics

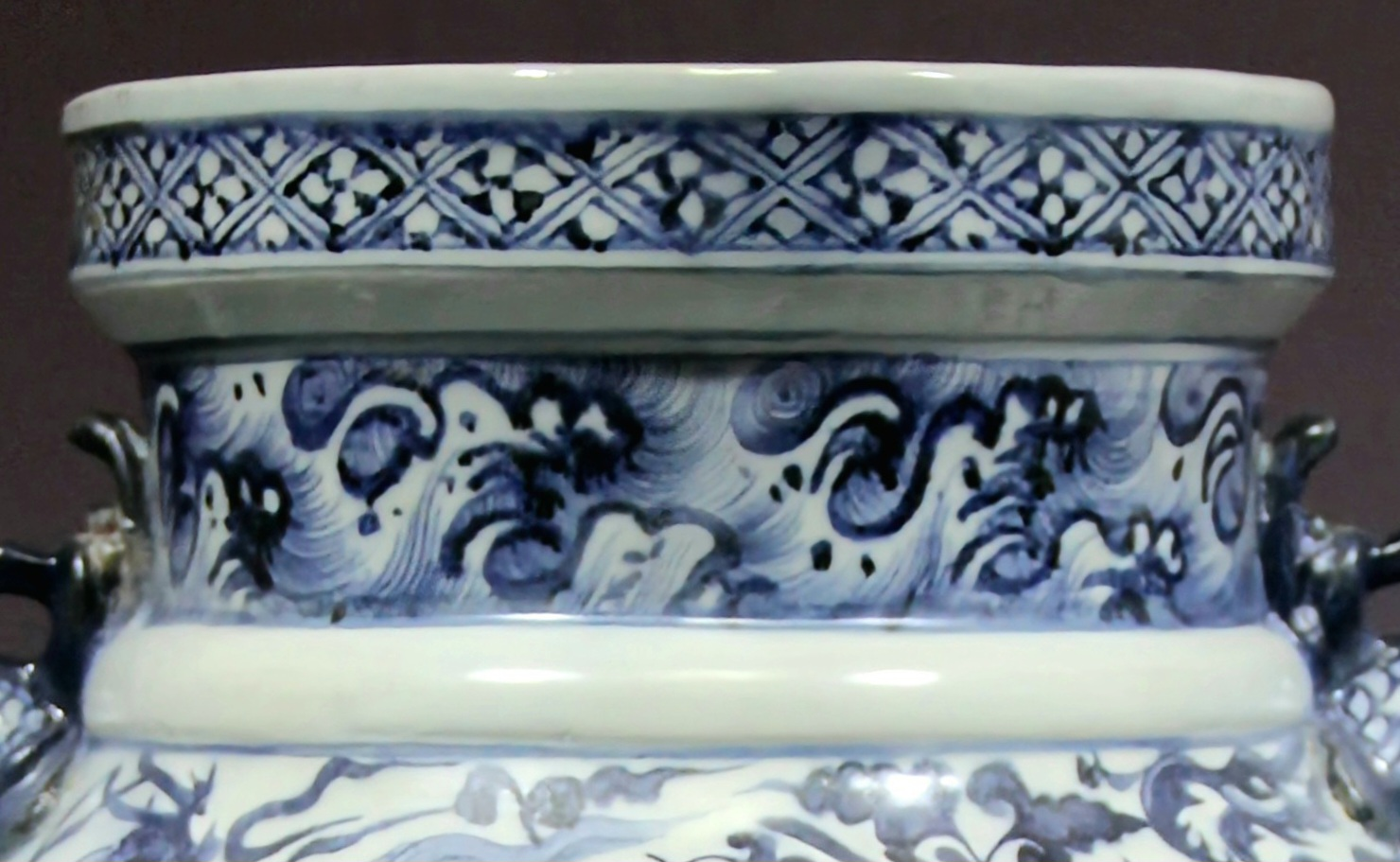
Top of a Yuan-dynasty vase, with a rock-and-wave zone in middle

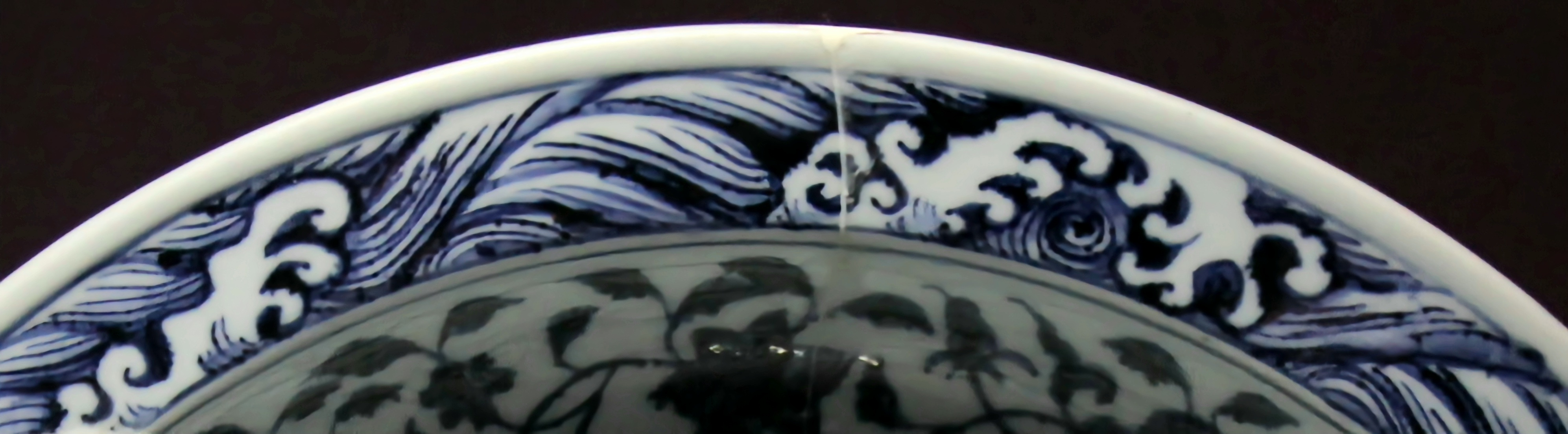
Detail of a Ming-dynasty, Yongle Emperor (r. 1402–1424) era dish

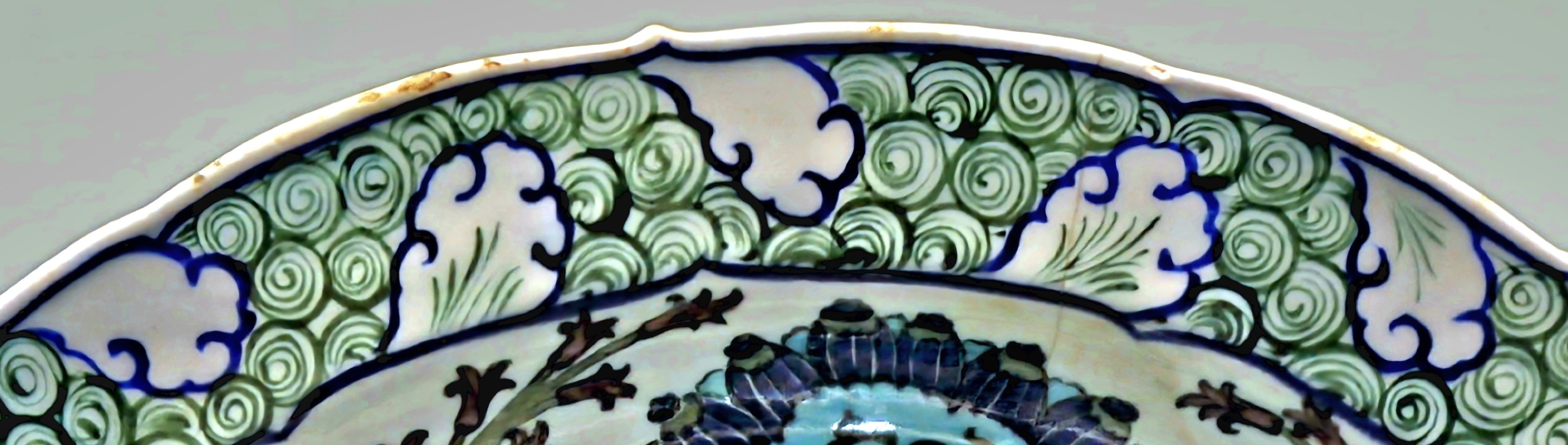
Detail of an Iznik pottery dish

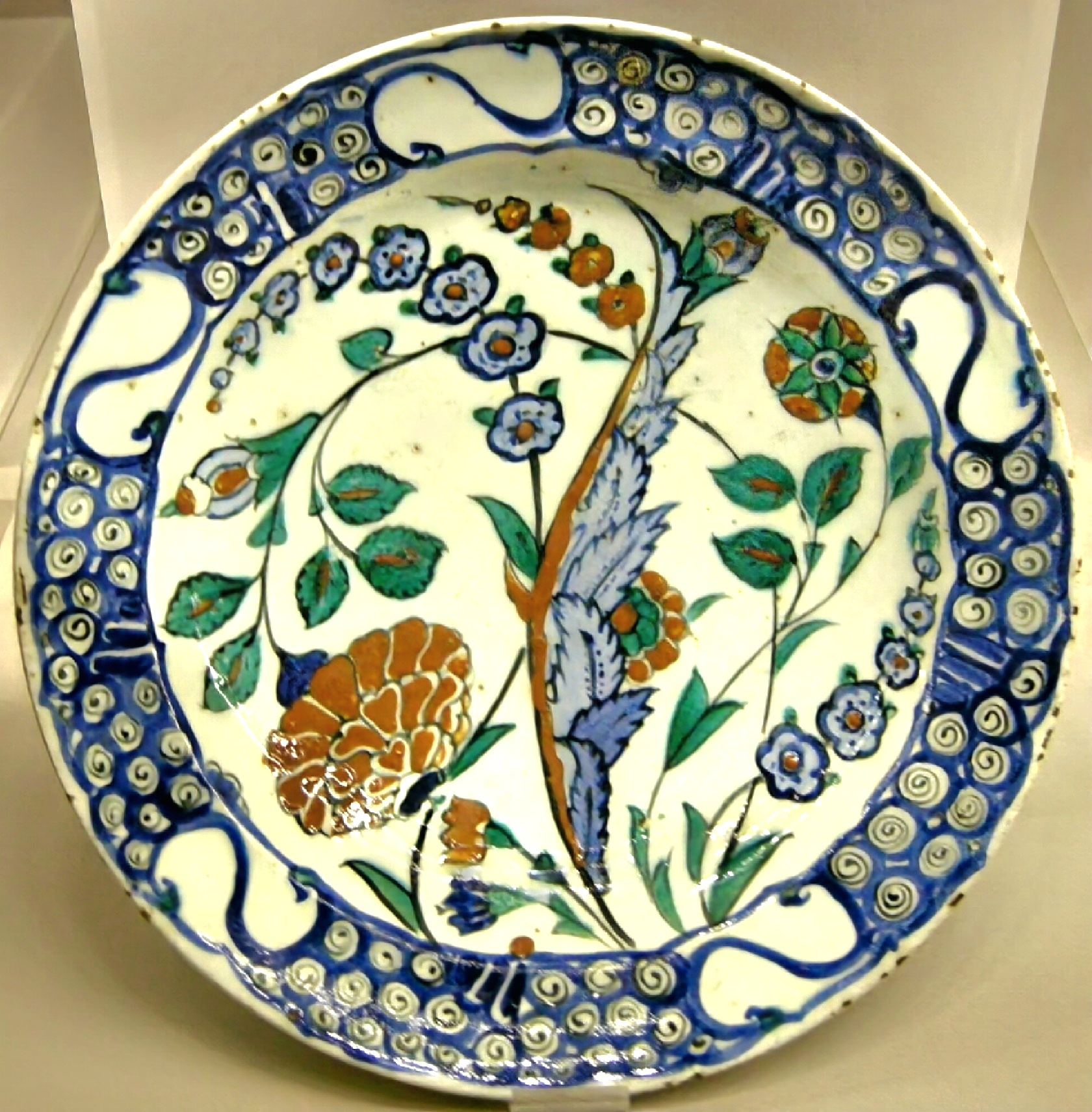
Iznik pottery dish with the so-called dollar pattern, c. 1550–1600

The rock and wave design or motif is found painted on the outer borders of some Asian ceramics. It originated in Chinese porcelain of the Yuan dynasty (1271–1368) and was later very often used in Iznik pottery and other Turkish ceramics. It represents turbulent waves breaking onto rocks, which are generally depicted as a regular pattern with a considerable degree of stylization, especially in Turkish examples. It is normally in blue and white, even where other parts of the piece use other colours.

The "rocks" are represented by blue spiral lines on a white background, and the waves by irregular shapes in white, sometimes with lines within them.

Turkish versions of the design were produced by c. 1500 if not earlier. The Turkish designs are sometimes criticized as "poorly understood" versions of the Chinese motif, and in many pieces, the design seems to have lost the sense of the marine subject.

== Terms ==
"Rock and wave" is a brusque Western version of the Chinese name pao-shan hai-shui (寶山海水), meaning "precious mountains and the sea". A related pattern, without the waves, is called the "rock of ages pattern"; there is also much decoration with just wave patterns. Another term used for the regular spiral motifs in Turkish pieces is "ammonite scrolls".

In later Turkish ceramics, especially in the 17th century, a version developed where the "rocks" were white spaces across the width of the border, and within them a blue or black scroll resembling a letter "S" on its side. These pieces are described in the West as using the dollar pattern, from the resemblance to the $ sign.

== History ==
Decoration representing waves had a considerable history in Chinese art in various media, often as a background for dragons and other sea monsters. These tended to use groups of parallel lines, rising and falling, and passing into each other. Sometimes the waves had breaking crests, typically left in white. Eventually, these turned into the "rocks" of the standard border pattern.

Chinese influences on Islamic pottery were already considerable and long-standing before much of the Islamic world was briefly politically united with China in the Mongol Empire. Large quantities of Chinese pottery were sent as diplomatic gifts, and there was also considerable trade. Many Chinese wares were designed for Islamic needs and tastes, in particular the large flattish plates which suited Islamic dining customs, rather than the deeper bowls of different sizes used by the Chinese themselves. The development of blue and white pottery in China, with detailed underglaze painting in cobalt blue pigments from Iran, is generally seen as a result of the cross-fertilization of artisans and techniques from different parts of the empire.

Fine Iznik wares closely imitating Chinese blue and white were produced from the 1520s onwards, taking as their models Chinese pieces from several decades earlier. This probably reflected both Ottoman taste and the Chinese pieces available in Turkey, considerably boosted by the loot from Ottoman military campaigns that took Damascus and in 1514 Tabriz.

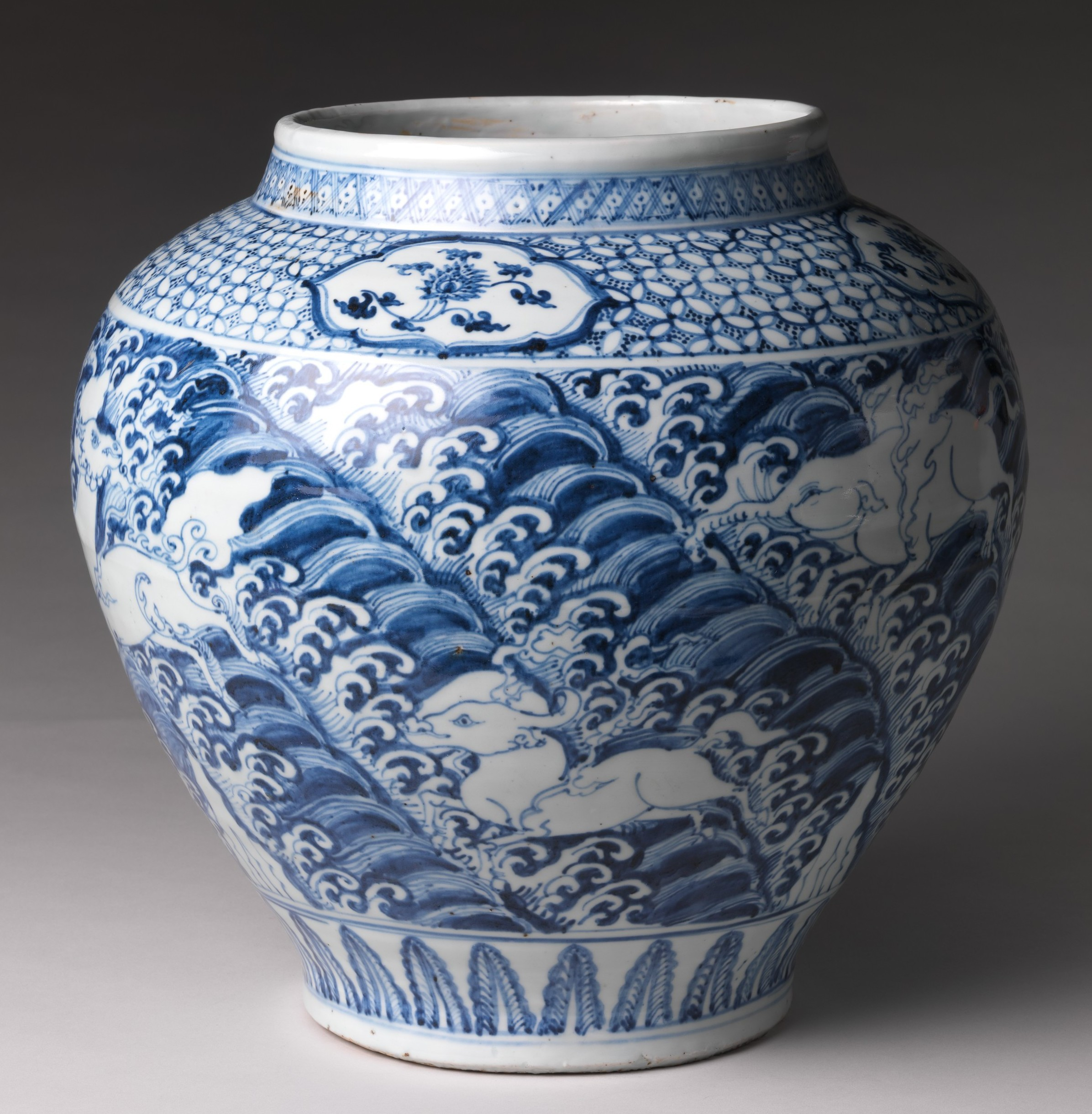
Chinese wave background on a mid-15th-century Ming vase

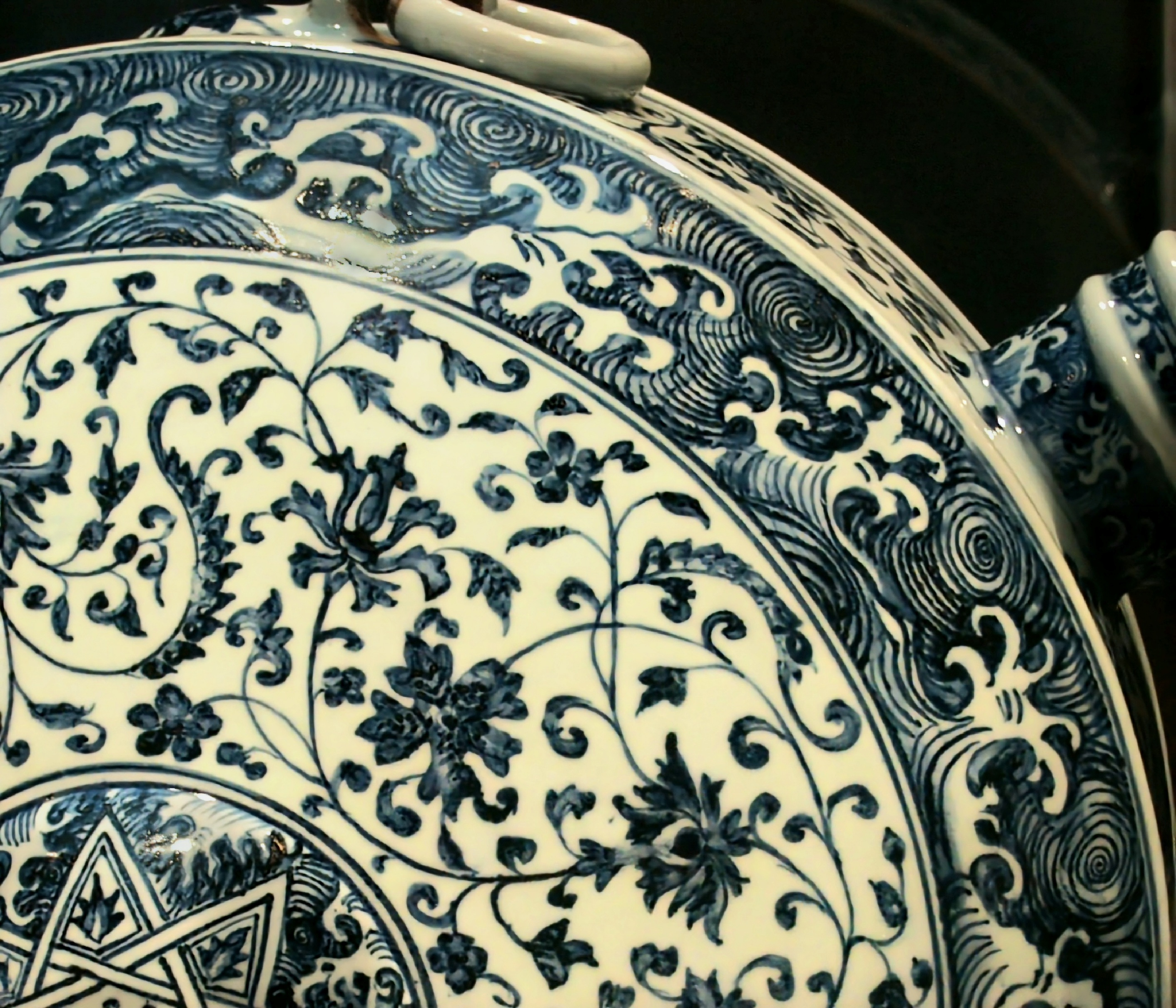
Detail of a 15th-century Ming flask, with spirals

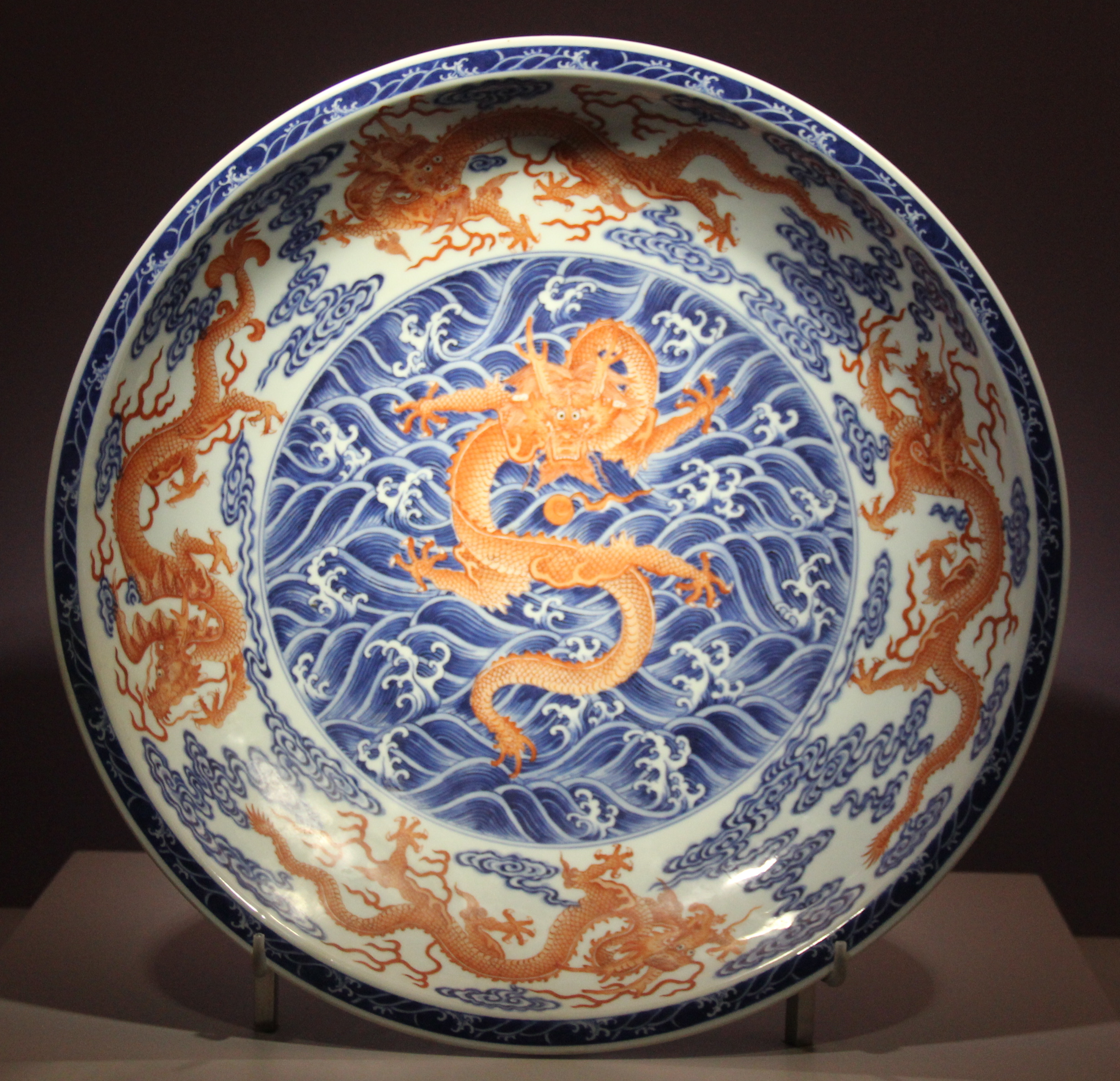
Qing-dynasty dish with dragon on wave background

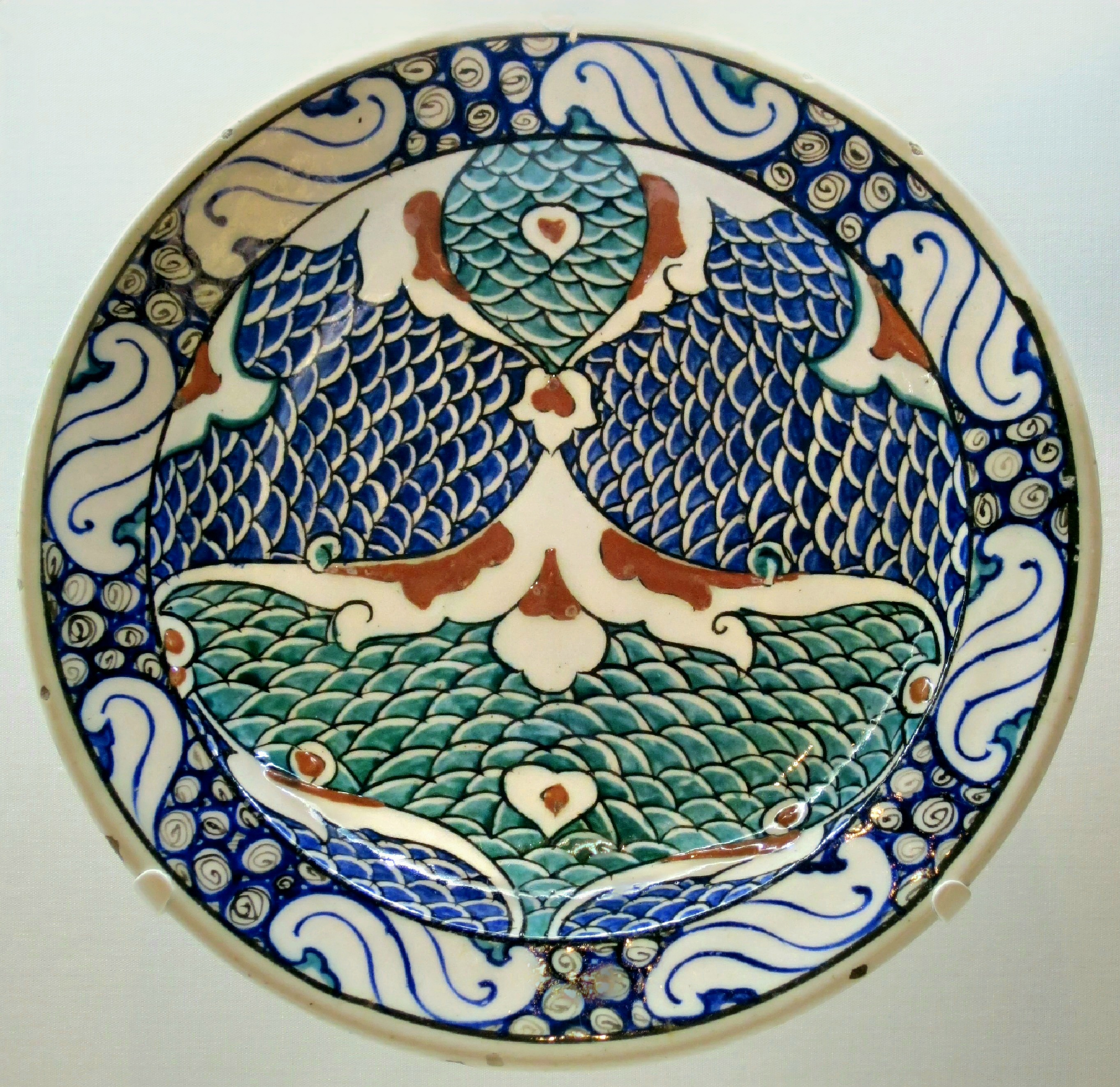
Iznik dollar pattern, c. 1580–1585

== Notes ==
Rock and wave
- Traditional Chinese: 寶山海水
- Simplified Chinese: 宝山海水
- Literal meaning: treasure mountain [and] seawater
Transcriptions
Standard Mandarin
- Hanyu Pinyin: bǎoshān hǎishuǐ
- Wade–Giles: pao^{3}-shan^{1} hai^{3}-shui^{3}
