= Improvised firearm =

Makeshift ranged weapon

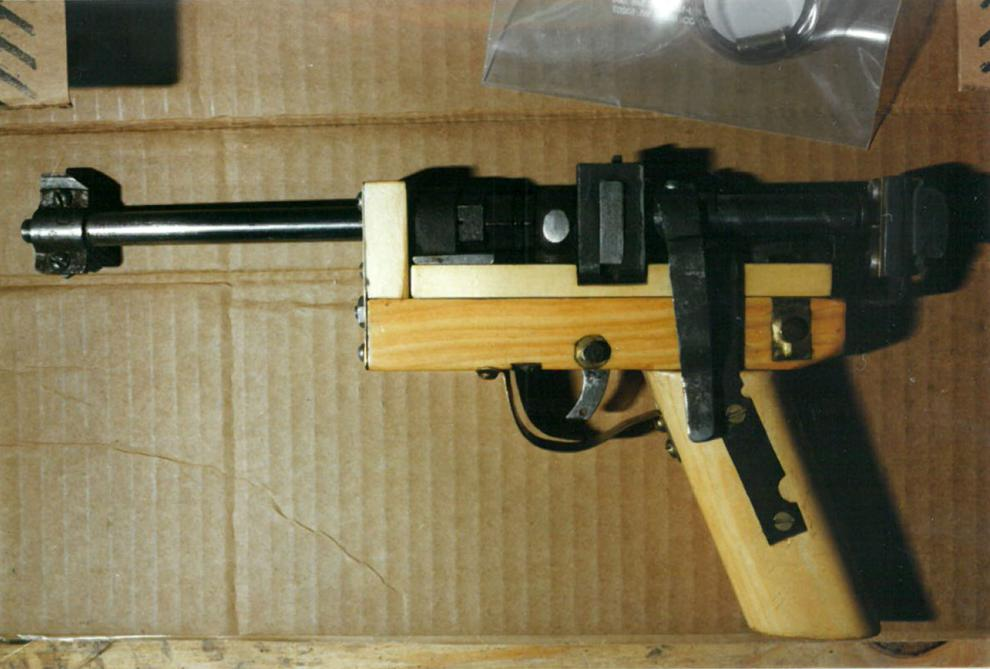
Ted Kaczynski's handmade gun dubbed the "Pistol for Homicide"

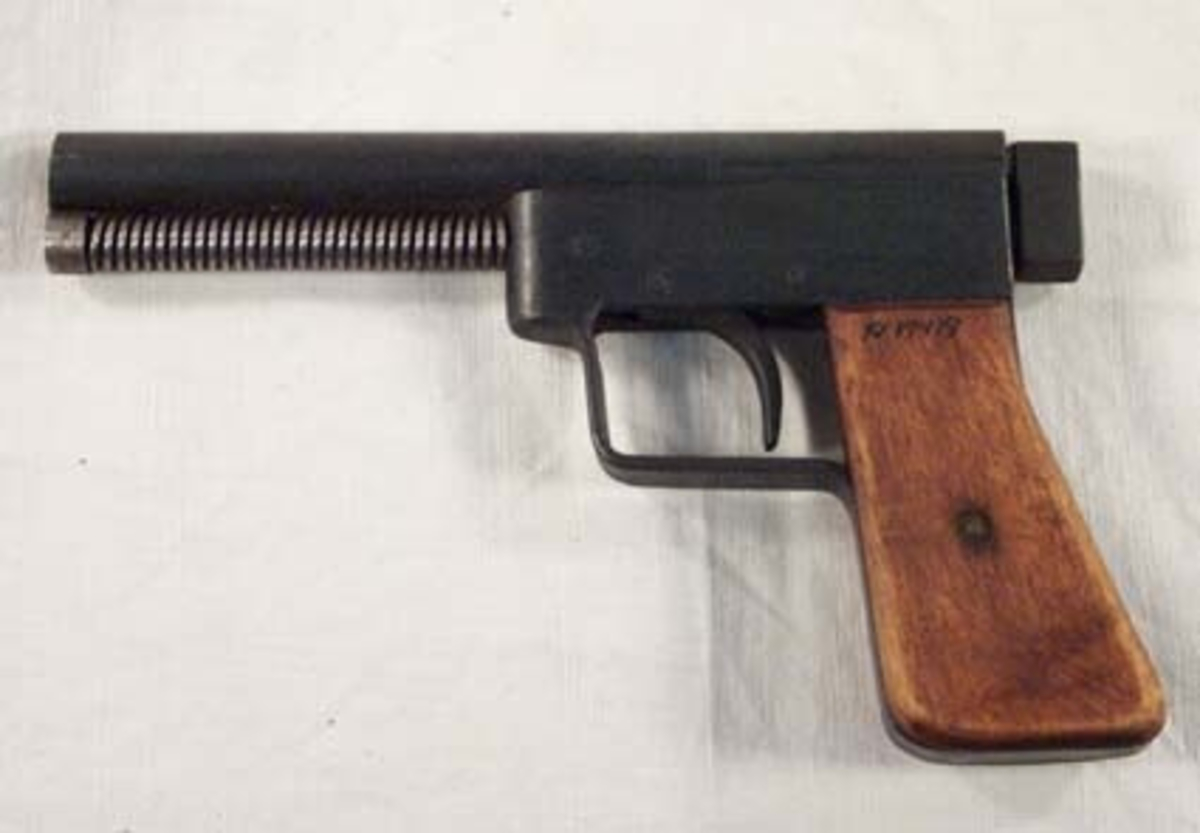
A homemade pistol, confiscated by the Swedish Police. Given to the Museum of Vänersborg in 1985

Improvised firearms (sometimes called zip guns, pipe guns, or slam guns) are firearms manufactured by an entity other than a registered firearms manufacturer or a gunsmith. Improvised firearms are typically constructed by adapting existing materials to the purpose. They range in quality, from crude weapons that are as much a danger to the user as the target, to high-quality arms produced by cottage industries using salvaged and repurposed materials.

Improvised firearms may be used as tools by criminals and insurgents and are sometimes associated with such groups. Other uses include self-defense in lawless areas and hunting game in poor rural areas.

== Types ==
=== Zip guns ===
Zip guns are generally crude homemade firearms consisting of a barrel, breechblock and a firing mechanism. For small, low-pressure cartridges, like the common .22 caliber rimfire cartridges, even very thin-walled tubing can work as a barrel, strapped to a block of wood for a handle. A rubber band that the shooter pulls back and releases to fire can power the firing pin. Weak tubing can result in a firearm that can be as dangerous to the shooter as the target; a poorly fitting smoothbore barrel provides little accuracy and is liable to burst upon firing. The better designs use heavier pipes and spring-loaded trigger mechanisms. Larger zip guns, such as homemade shotguns called tumbera (Argentina), bakakuk (Malaysia), or sumpak (Philippines) are also made of improvised materials like nails, steel pipes, wooden pieces, bits of string, etc.

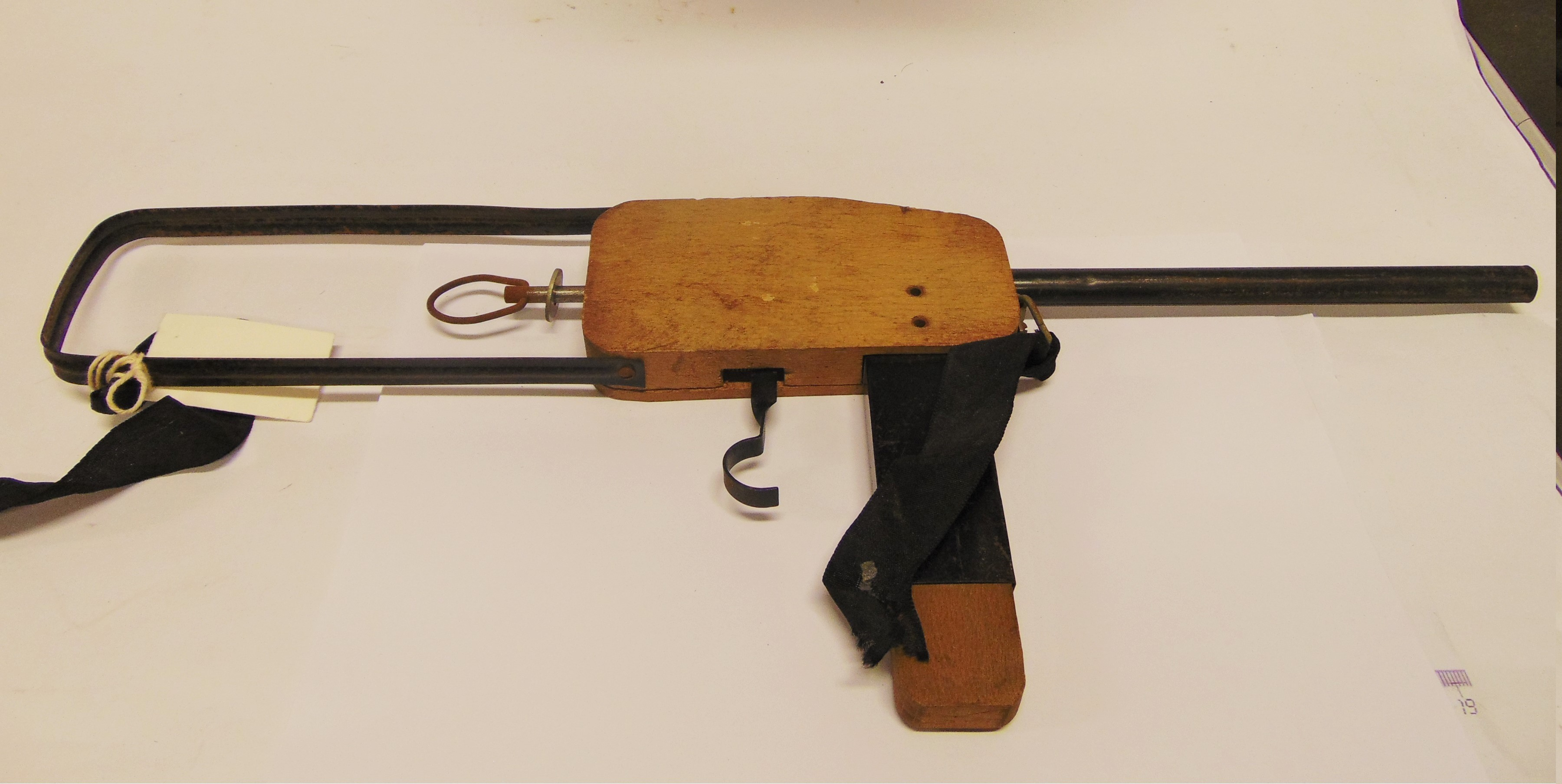
Improvised firearm used during World War II

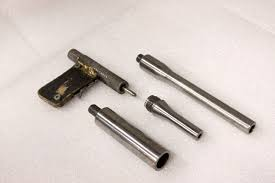
Improvised zip-gun with interchangeable barrels

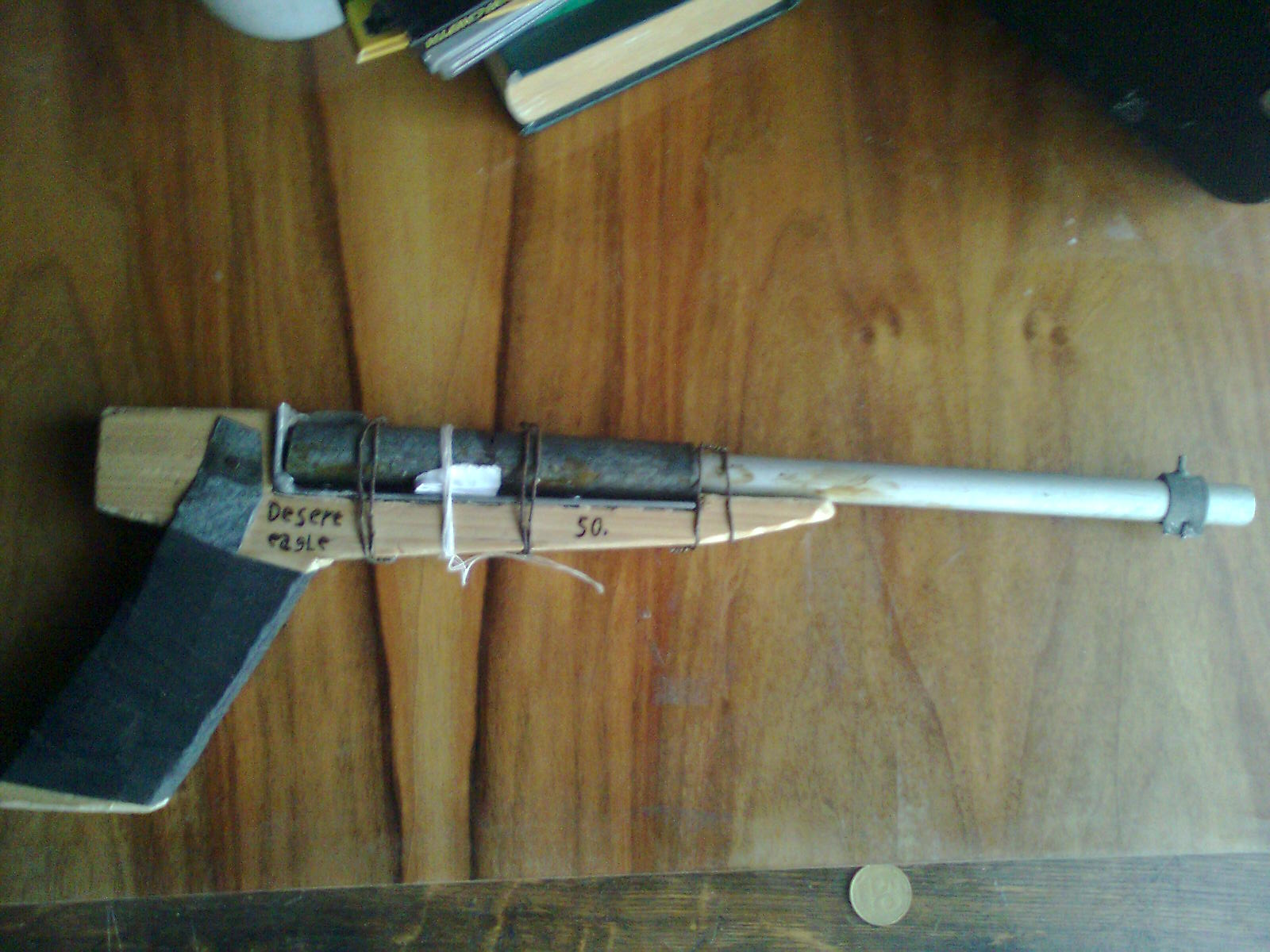
Zip gun

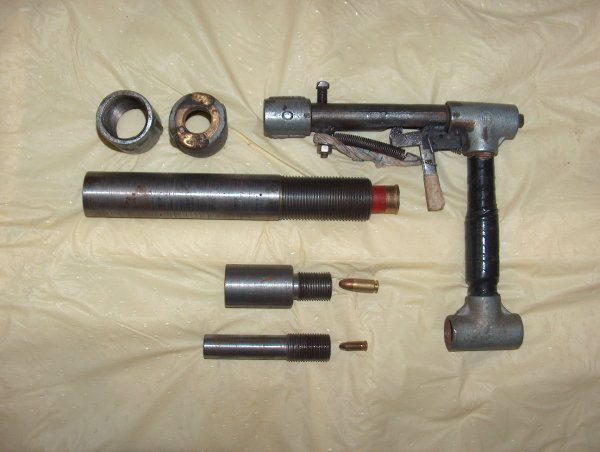
A crude yet functioning homemade gun made by a man in India, constructed mostly out of plumbing material

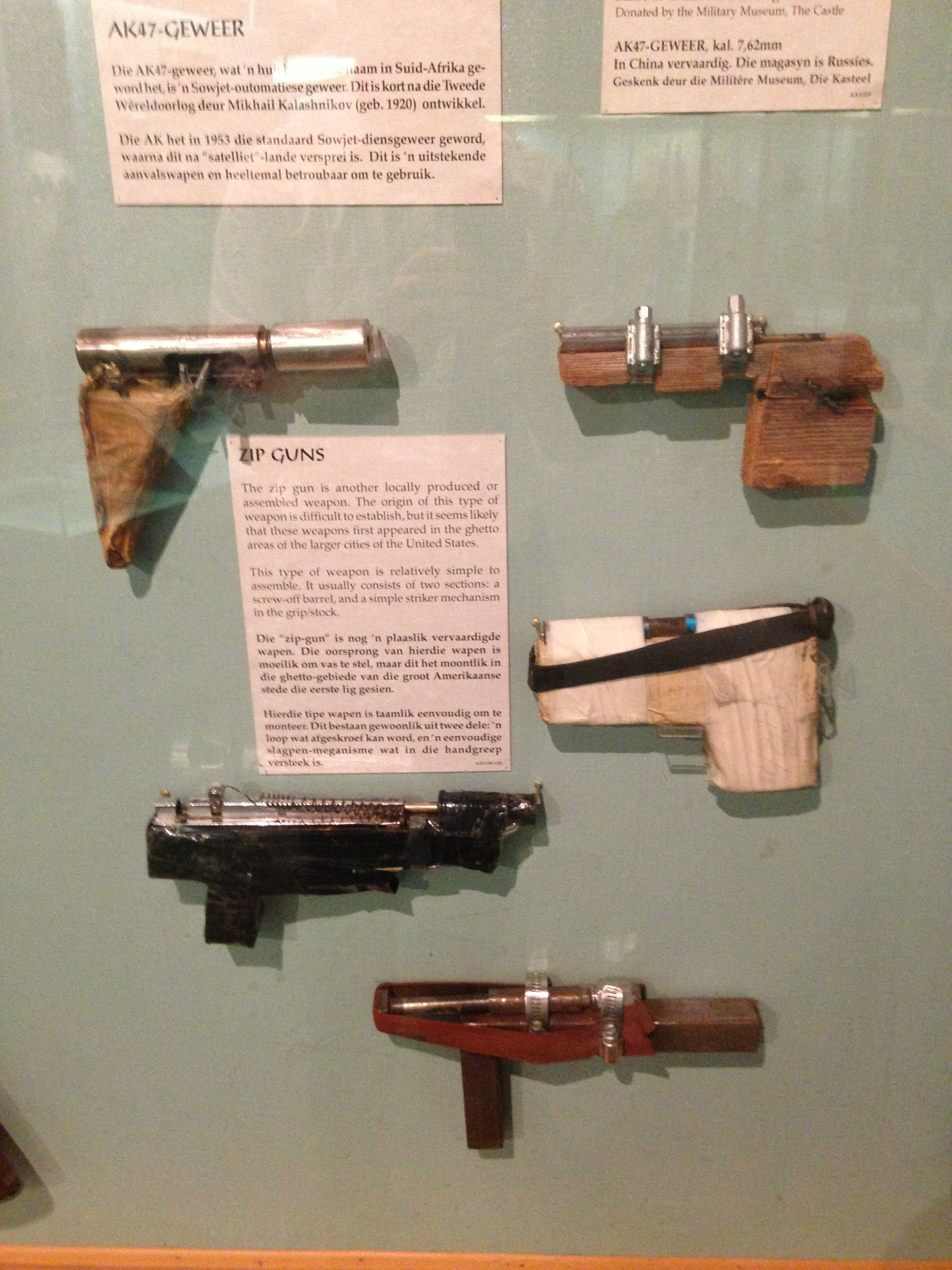
A collection of South African zip guns at the Slave Lodge museum in Cape Town, South Africa

=== Pen guns ===
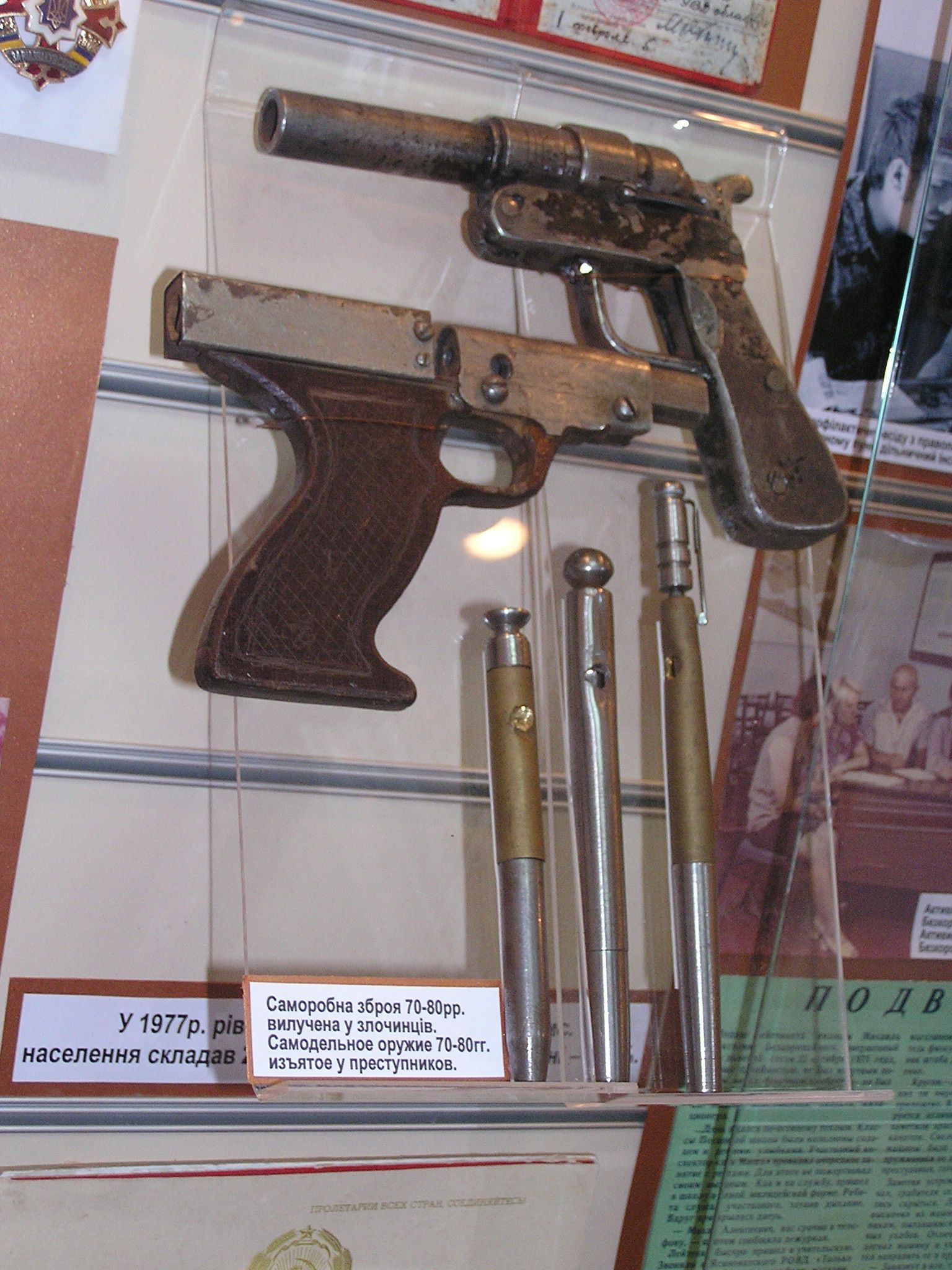
Homemade pen guns (Museum of the History of Donetsk militsiya)

Pen guns are zip gun-like firearms that resemble ink pens. They generally are of small caliber (e.g., .22 LR, .25 ACP, .32 ACP, etc.) and are single shot. Early examples of pen guns were pinfired, but modern designs are rimfire or centerfire. Some pen guns are not designed to fire regular cartridges, but rather blank cartridges, signal flares, or tear gas cartridges.

In the United States, pen guns that fire bullets or shot cartridges do not require a reconfiguration to fire, (e.g., folding to the shape of a pistol) and are federally regulated as an Any Other Weapon (Title II). They require registration under the National Firearms Act and a tax in the amount of $0.00 to manufacture or $5 to transfer is levied.

=== Pipe guns ===
Pipe guns were first seen in the Philippines during World War II. The "paliuntod" is a type of improvised shotgun commonly used by guerrillas and the joint American and Filipino soldiers who remained behind after Douglas MacArthur's withdrawal. Made of two pieces of pipe that fit snugly together, the "paliuntod" were simple, single-shot guns. These pipe guns are still in use by both criminals and rebels in the Philippines.

In 1946, pipe guns were patented in the United States by Iliff D. "Rich" Richardson, who fought with the Filipino insurgents during the Japanese occupation. Made by "Richardson Industries" as the "Model R5 Philippine Guerrilla Gun", these 12 gauge shotguns sold for $7 at the time.

Improvised versions are made by using two pipes and an endcap; they usually fire shotgun shells. To fire the gun, the user inserts a shotgun shell into the smaller diameter pipe, places the smaller pipe into the larger diameter pipe, and forcefully slides it back until the shell's primer makes contact with a fixed firing pin located inside the endcap. Other improved versions use improvised detachable magazines.

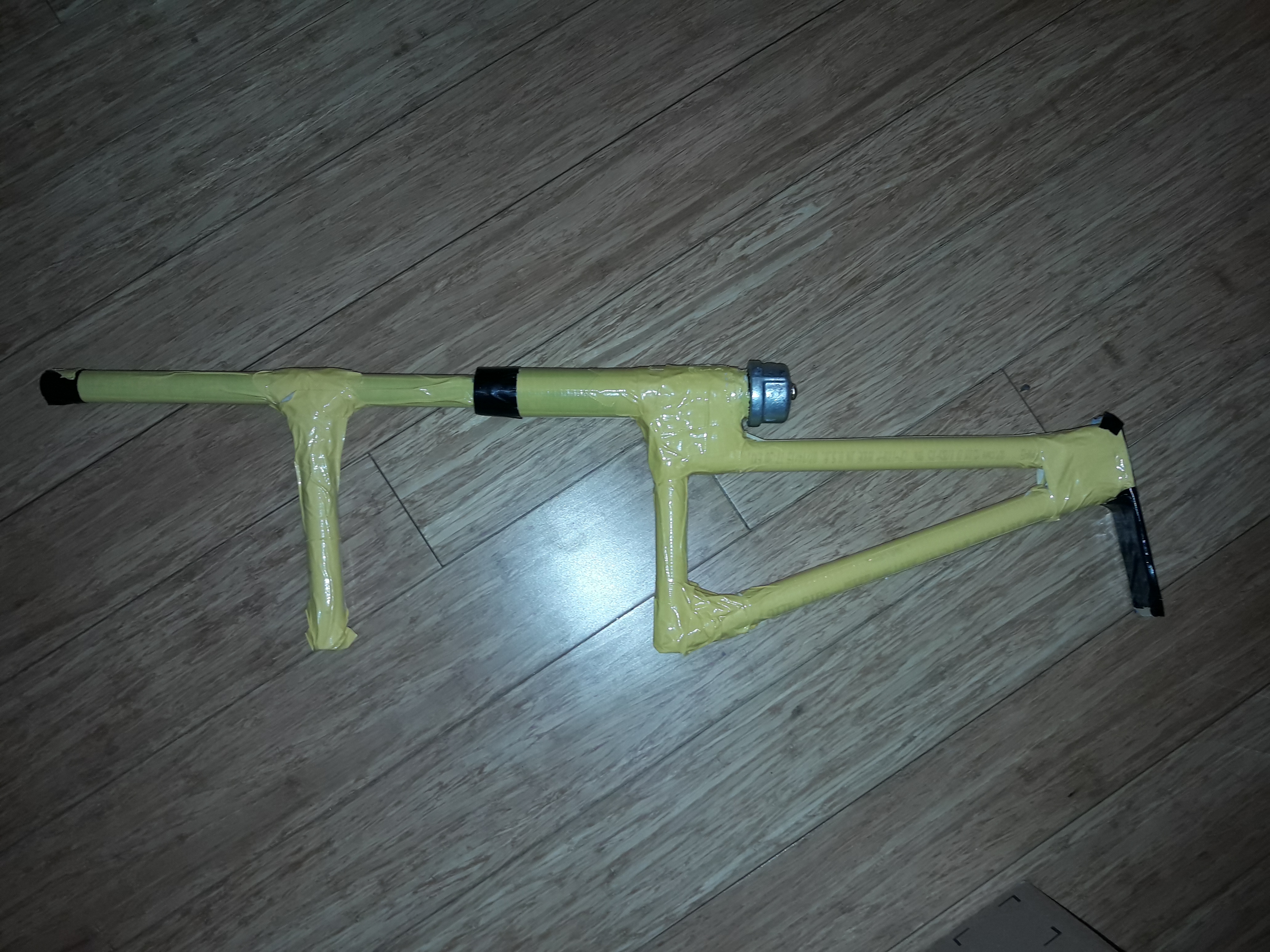
A homemade pipe shotgun that shoots .410 shotgun shells.

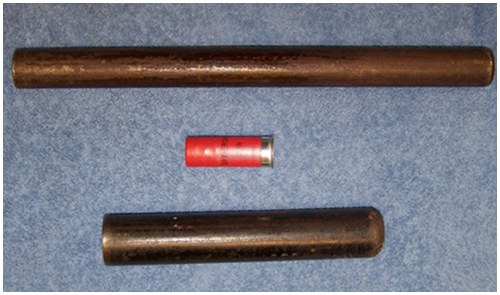
Improvised pipe gun; showing barrel, receiver and a 12 gauge shotgun shell

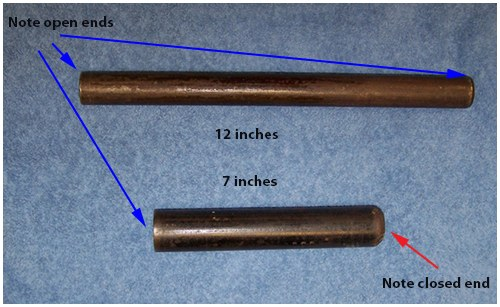
Improvised pipe gun; showing dimensions

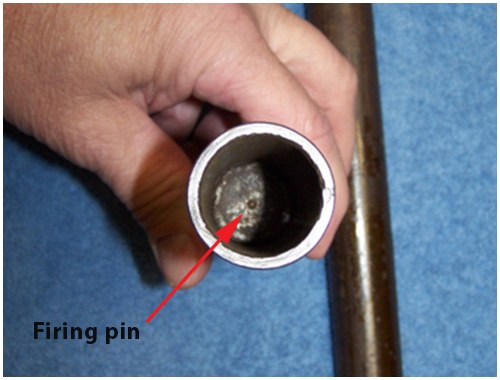
Improvised pipe gun; showing firing pin inside receiver

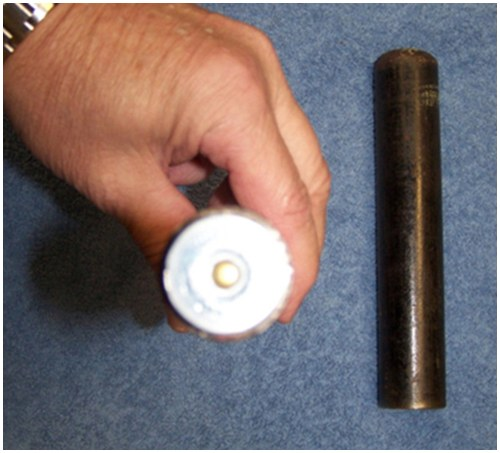
Improvised pipe gun; showing 12 gauge shotgun shell

=== Repurposed or conversions ===
Flare guns have also been converted to firearms. This may be accomplished by replacing the (often plastic) barrel of the flare gun with a metal pipe strong enough to chamber a shotgun shell, or by inserting a smaller-bore barrel into the existing barrel (such as with a caliber conversion sleeve) to chamber a firearm cartridge, such as a .22 Long Rifle.

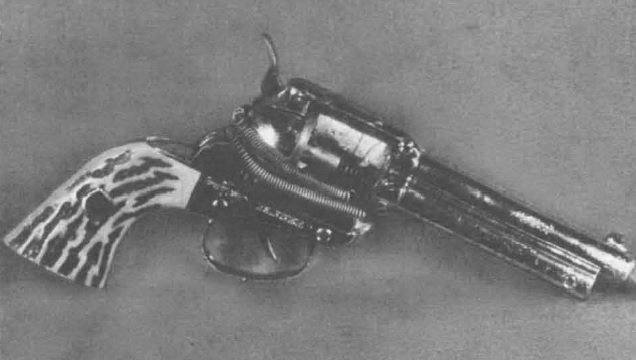
A zip gun constructed from a toy cap gun. The gun is capable of shooting a .22 caliber round

More advanced improvised guns can use parts from other gun-like products. One example is the cap gun. A cap gun can be disassembled, and a barrel added, turning the toy gun into a real one. A firing pin can then be added to the hammer, to concentrate the force onto the primer of the cartridge. If the cap gun has a strong enough hammer spring, the existing trigger mechanism can be used as-is; otherwise, rubber bands may be added to increase the power of the hammer.

Air guns have also been modified to convert them to firearms. The Brocock Air Cartridge System, for example, uses a self-contained "cartridge" roughly the size of a .38 Special cartridge, which contains an air reservoir, valve, and a .22 caliber (5.5 mm) pellet. Examples of BACS airguns converted to firearms, either by drilling the barrel out to fire a .38 Special cartridge or by altering the cylinder to accept .22 caliber cartridges, have been used in a number of crimes. Blank-firing guns can also be converted by adding a barrel, although the low-quality alloys used for cheaper blank-firing guns may break with the pressures and stresses of a real bullet being fired.

=== Cryptic firearms ===
Some more complex improvised firearms are not only well-built, but also use mimicry as camouflage, taking the appearance of other items. Improvised firearms in the form of flashlights, mobile phones, canes and large bolts have all been seized by law enforcement officials. Most of these are .22 caliber rimfires, but flashlight guns have been found ranging from small models firing .22 Long Rifle to larger ones chambered for .410 bore shotgun shells.

While most improvised firearms are single-shot, multiple-shot versions are also encountered. The simplest multi-shot zip guns are derringer-like, and consist of a number of single-shot zip guns attached together. The pepper-box design is also used in homemade guns because it is relatively easy to make out of a bundle of pipes or a steel cylinder. In late 2000, British police encountered a four-shot .22 LR zip gun disguised as a mobile phone, where different keys on the keypad fire different barrels. Because of this discovery, mobile phones are now X-rayed by airport screeners worldwide. Authorities believe they were manufactured in Croatia, and they still turned up in Europe as late as 2004, according to a report by Time magazine.

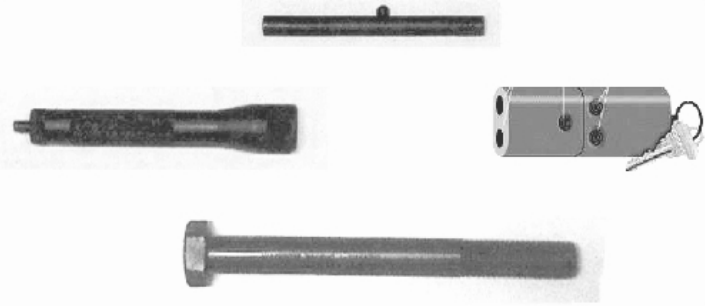
U.S. manufactured covert firearms (Clockwise from bottom) 7/8-inch Bolt gun; Flashlight gun; Pen gun (All are .22 caliber); Double barrel .32 caliber key chain gun

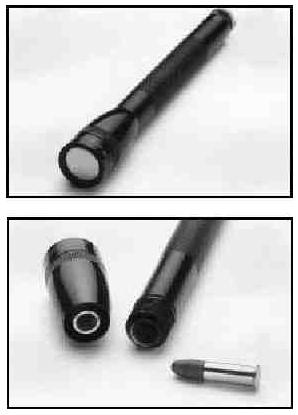
Improvised firearm disguised as a flashlight/torch

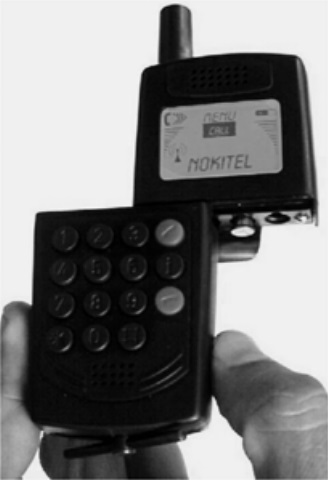
Four-shot gun disguised as a mobile phone

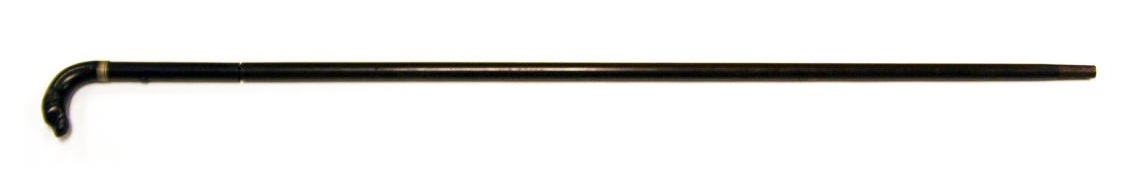
Cane gun

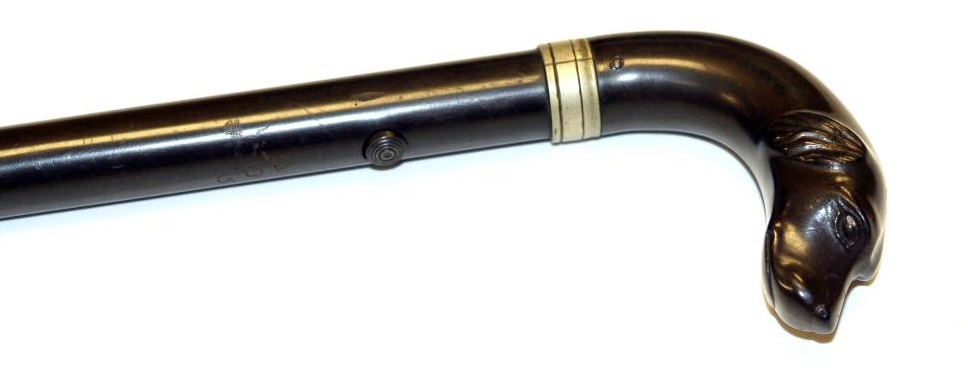
Cane gun grip and trigger close-up

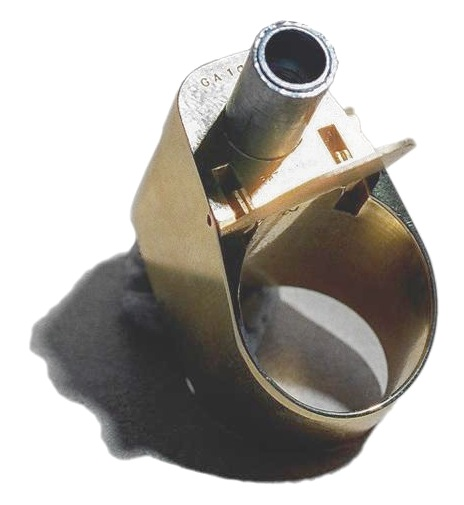
Finger-ring gun

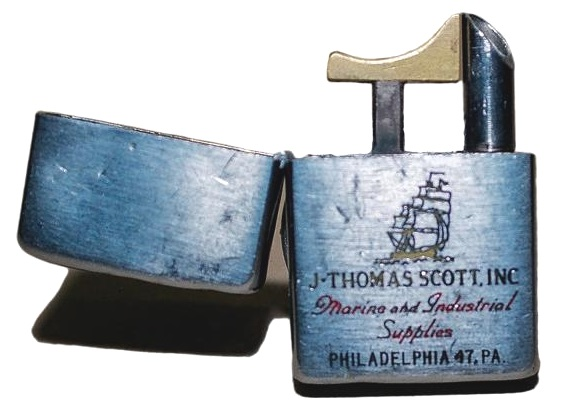
Zippo lighter gun

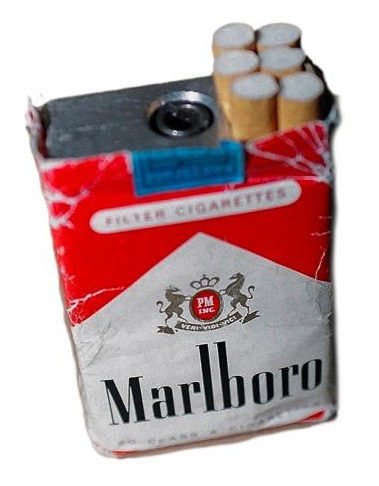
Marlboro filter cigarette pack gun

=== Submachine guns ===
Homemade submachine guns are often made by copying existing designs, or by adapting simple, open-bolt actions and leveraging commonly available hardware store parts.

The Błyskawica (Polish for lightning) was a submachine gun produced by the Armia Krajowa, or Home Army, a Polish resistance movement fighting the Germans in occupied Poland. Together with a Polish version of the Sten submachine gun, with which it shares some design elements, it was the only weapon mass-produced covertly in occupied Europe during World War II.

The Bechowiec (also known as the Bechowiec-1) was a Polish World War II submachine gun developed and produced by the underground Bataliony Chłopskie (BCh, Peasants' Battalions) resistance organisation. It was designed in 1943 by Henryk Strąpoć and was produced in underground facilities in the area of Ostrowiec Świętokrzyski. Its name was coined after the Bataliony Chłopskie organization members who were informally called bechowiec (plural: bechowcy).

The Borz (Борз, Chechen for "wolf") submachine gun is one of a number of improvised firearms produced in Chechnya. It was produced in small numbers from 1992 to 1999. It was used primarily by Chechen separatists. It is named after the Borz (wolf) because of its position as Chechnya's national animal.

The Carlo (also referred to as Carl Gustav) is a submachine gun manufactured by small workshops in the West Bank. The design has been inspired by the Swedish Carl Gustav m/45 and its Egyptian Port Said variant; however, the similarity is often only passing. Produced in several locations and often with second-hand gun parts, the specifications are not uniform. Typically the weapon is automatic. Often chambered for 9mm Parabellum pistol cartridges, variants for .22 LR, .32 ACP, 9mm Makarov, and 5.56 NATO are also produced. The weapon itself is cheap to manufacture but is inaccurate and prone to jamming and misfires.

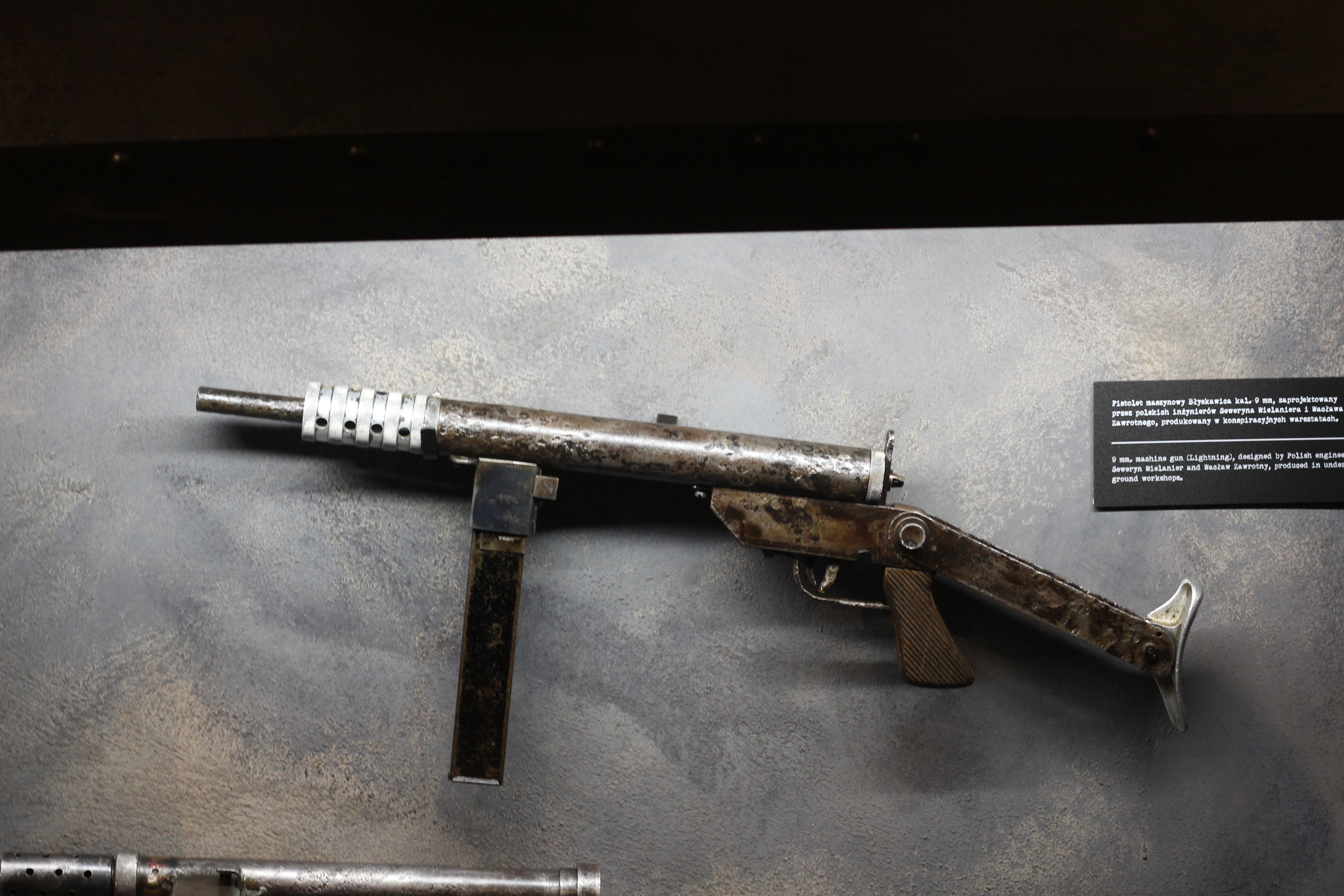
Homemade Błyskawica submachine gun in Warsaw Uprising

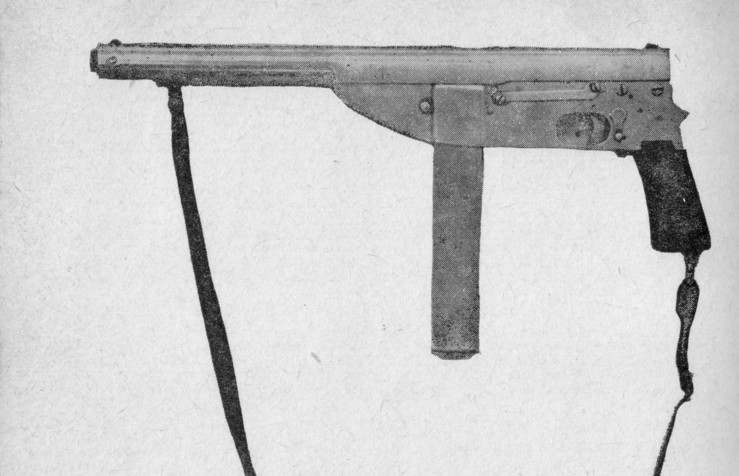
Homemade Bechowiec submachine gun in Warsaw Uprising

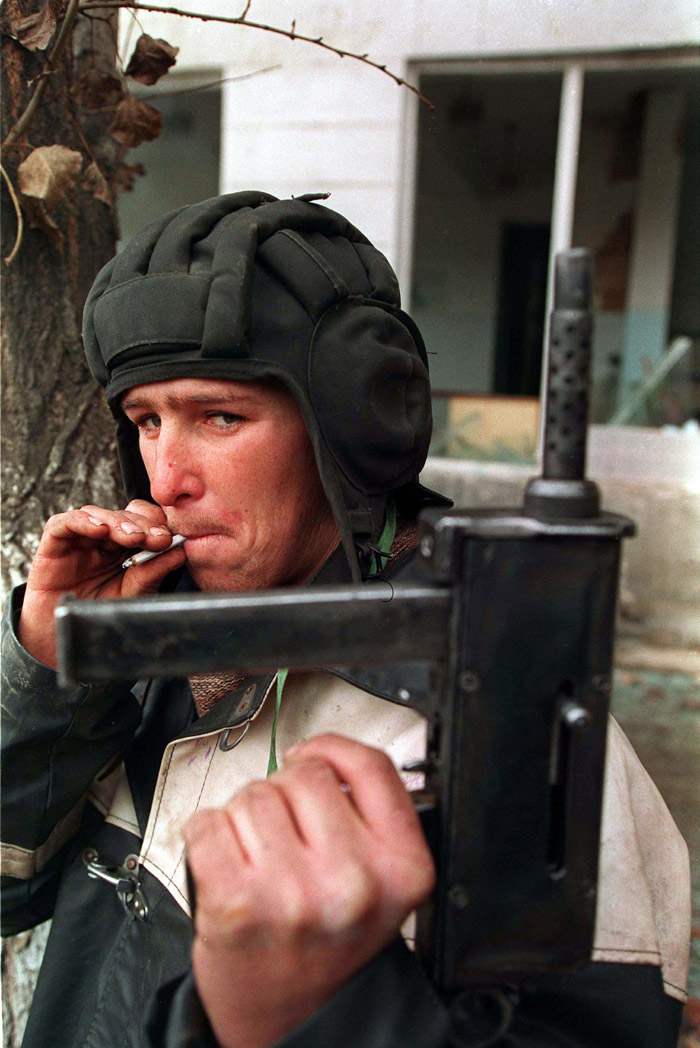
A Chechen fighter holds up his homemade Borz submachine gun during the battle for Grozny, January 1995

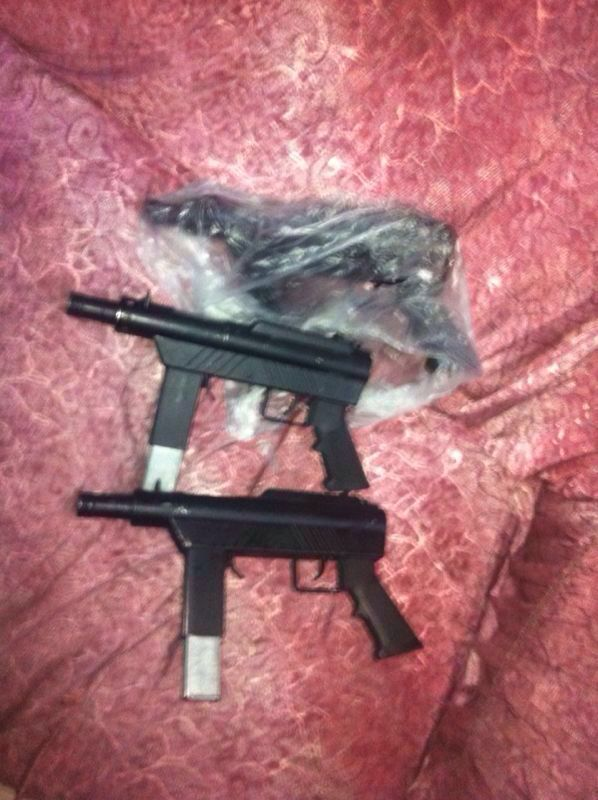
Three homemade Carlo submachine guns

=== Liberators ===
The FP-45 Liberator and the Deer gun were crude zip gun-like single-shot pistols or derringers manufactured by the United States government for use by resistance forces in occupied territories, during World War II and the Vietnam War, respectively.

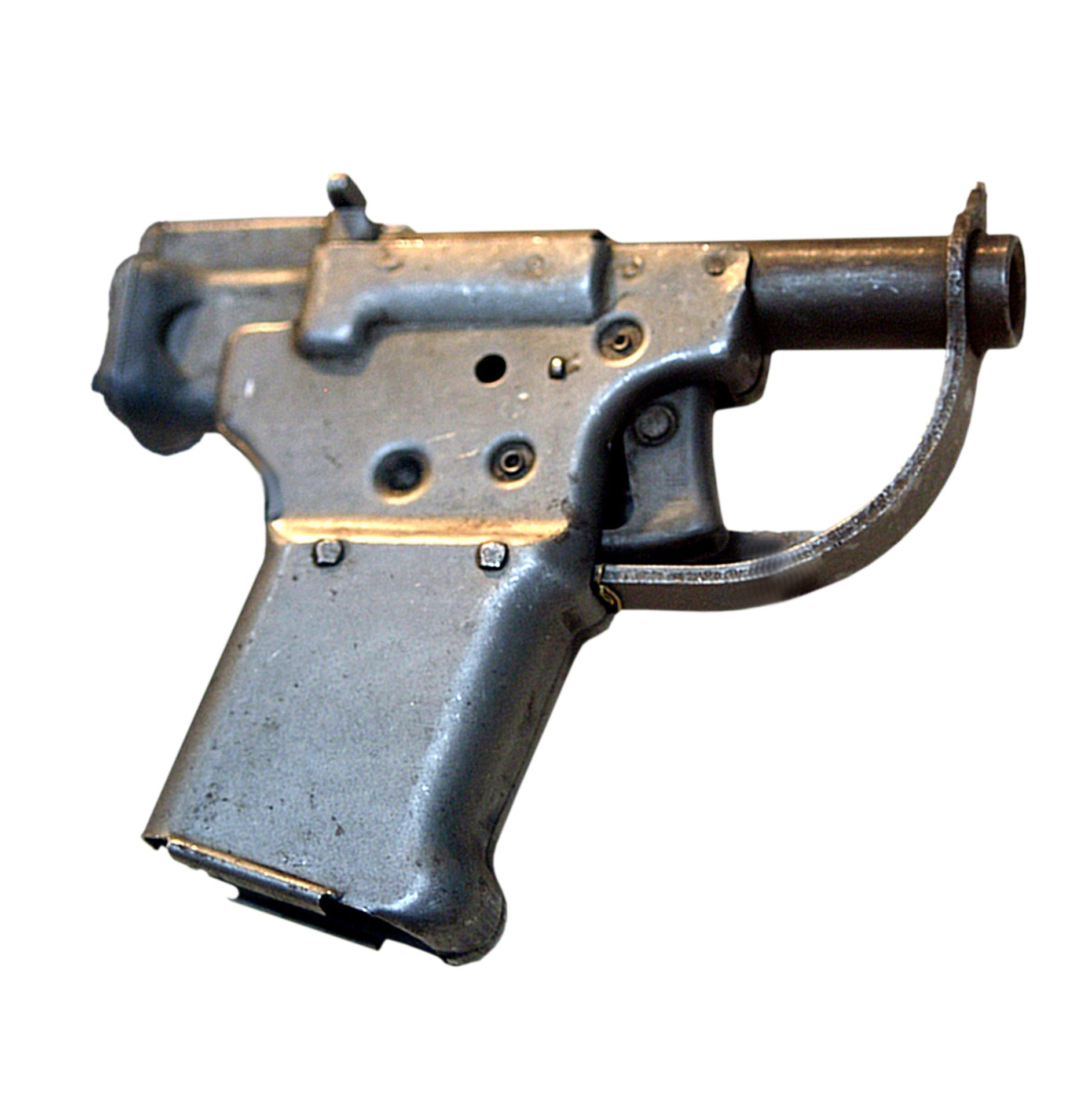
FP-45 Liberator (Zip Gun)

The FP-45 was designed to be cheaply and quickly mass-produced. It had just 23 largely stamped and turned steel parts that were cheap and easy to manufacture. It fired the .45 ACP pistol cartridge from an unrifled barrel and five rounds of .45 ACP ammunition could be stored in the pistol grip. Due to this limitation, it was intended for short range use, 1–4 yards (0.91–3.66 m). Its maximum effective range was only about 25 ft (7.6 m). At longer range, the bullet would begin to tumble and stray off course. The original delivered cost for the FP-45 was US$2.10/unit, lending it the nickname "Woolworth pistol".

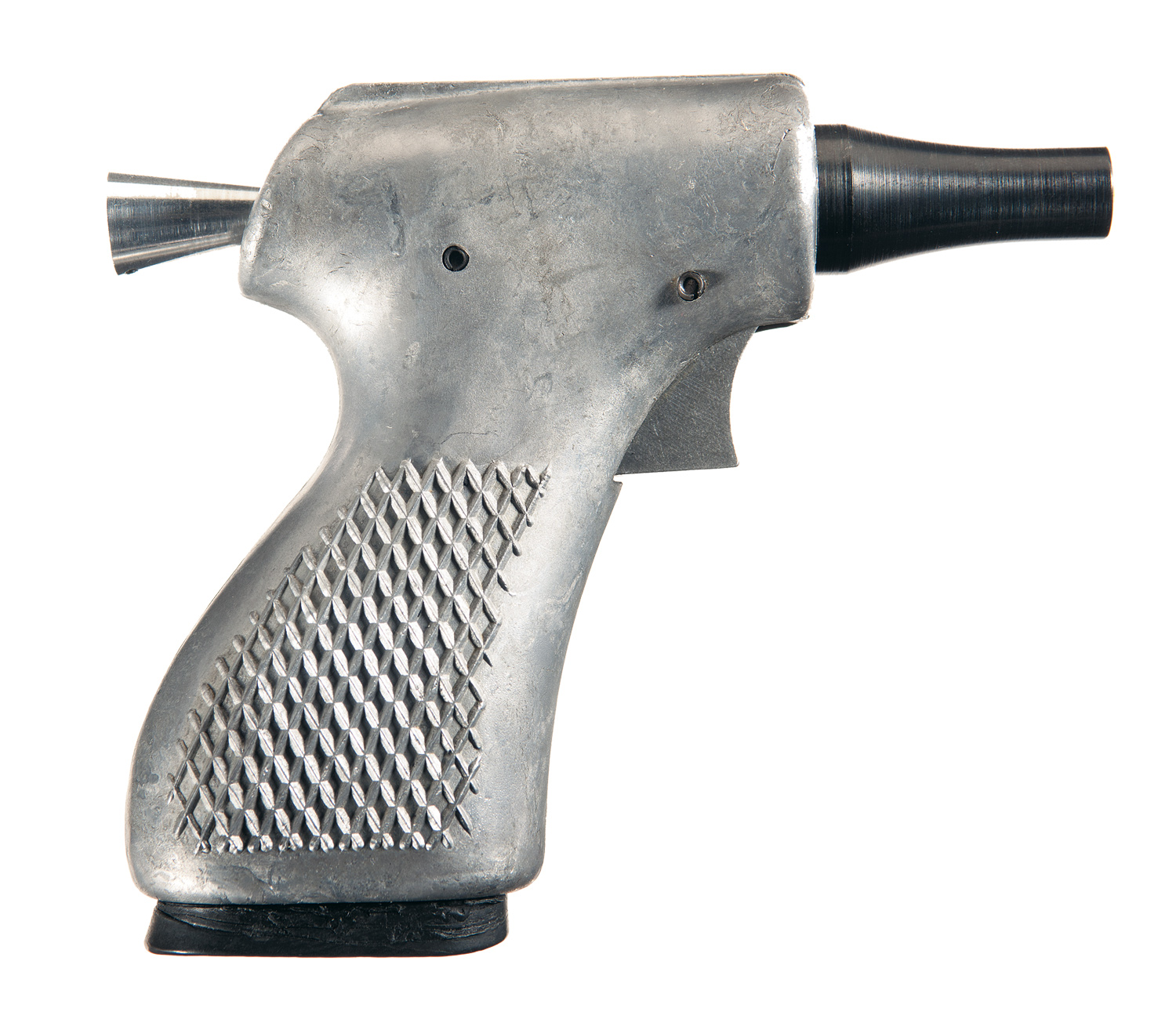
Deer gun (or Zip Gun)

The Deer gun fired the 9mm Parabellum pistol cartridge. It was made of cast aluminium, with the receiver formed into a cylinder at the top of the weapon. The striker protruded from the rear of the receiver and was cocked in order to fire, and a plastic clip was placed there to prevent an accidental discharge, as the Deer gun had no mechanical safety. The grip had raised checkering, was hollow, and had space for three 9mm Parabellum rounds and a rod for clearing the barrel of spent cases. The Deer gun lacked any marking identifying manufacturer or user, in order to prevent tracing of the weapons, and all were delivered in unmarked polystyrene boxes with three 9mm Parabellum rounds and a series of pictures depicting the operation of the gun. A groove ran down a ramp on top for sighting. The barrel unscrewed for loading and removing the empty casing. A cocking knob was pulled until cocked. The aluminium trigger had no trigger guard.

=== 3D printed firearms ===
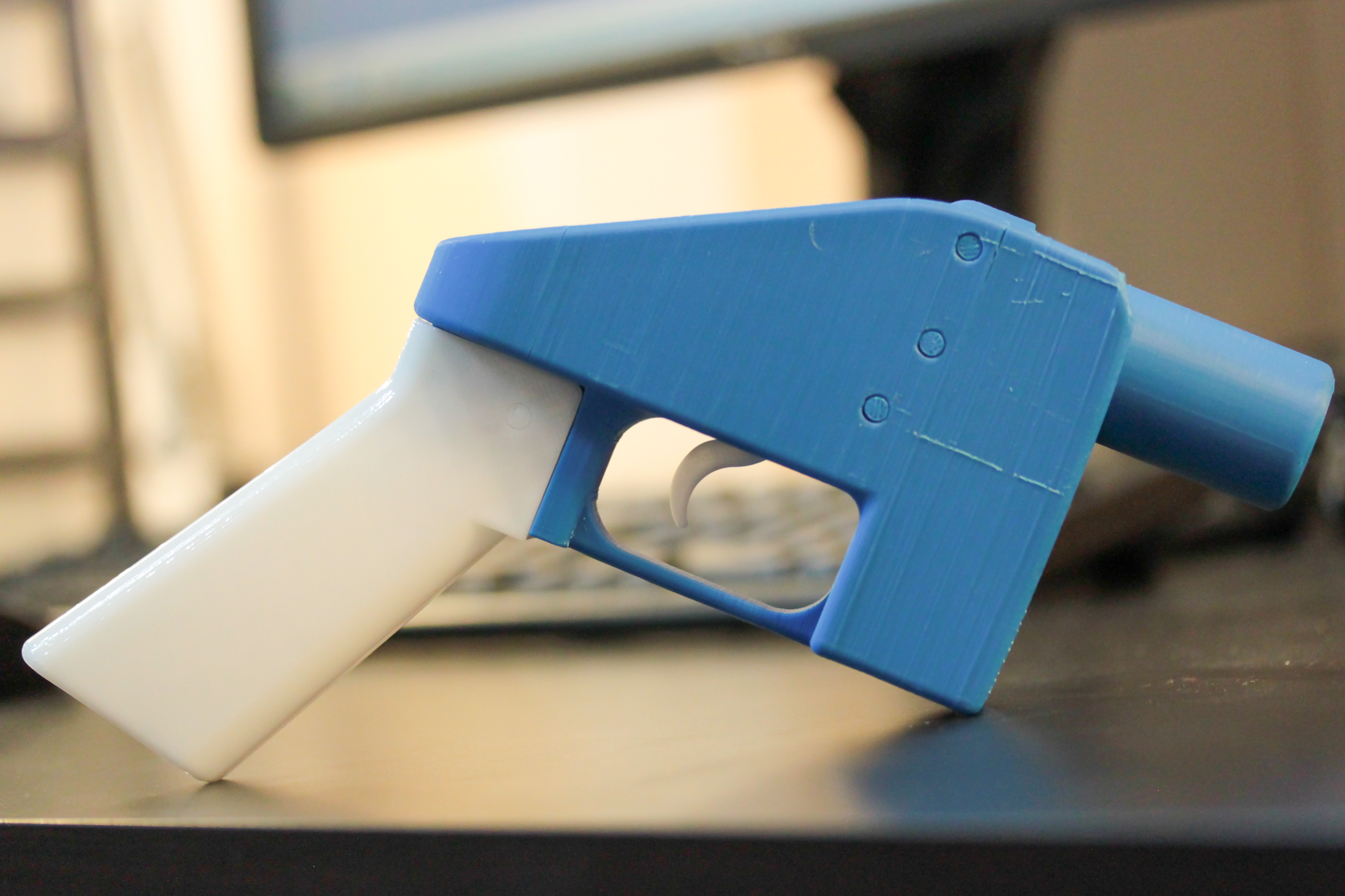
The 'Liberator' is a 3D-printable single shot handgun, the first such printable firearm design made widely available online

In 2012, the U.S.-based group Defense Distributed disclosed plans to design a working plastic gun that could be downloaded and reproduced by anybody with a 3D printer. The Liberator is a physible, 3D-printable single shot handgun, the first such printable firearm design made widely available online. The open source firm Defense Distributed designed the gun and released the plans on the Internet on May 6, 2013. The plans were downloaded over 100,000 times in the two days before the United States Department of State demanded that Defense Distributed retract the plans, deeming them a violation of the Arms Export Control Act. In 2015, Defense Distributed founder Cody Wilson sued the United States government on free speech grounds and in 2018 the Department of Justice settled, acknowledging Wilson's right to publish instructions for the production of 3D-printed firearms.

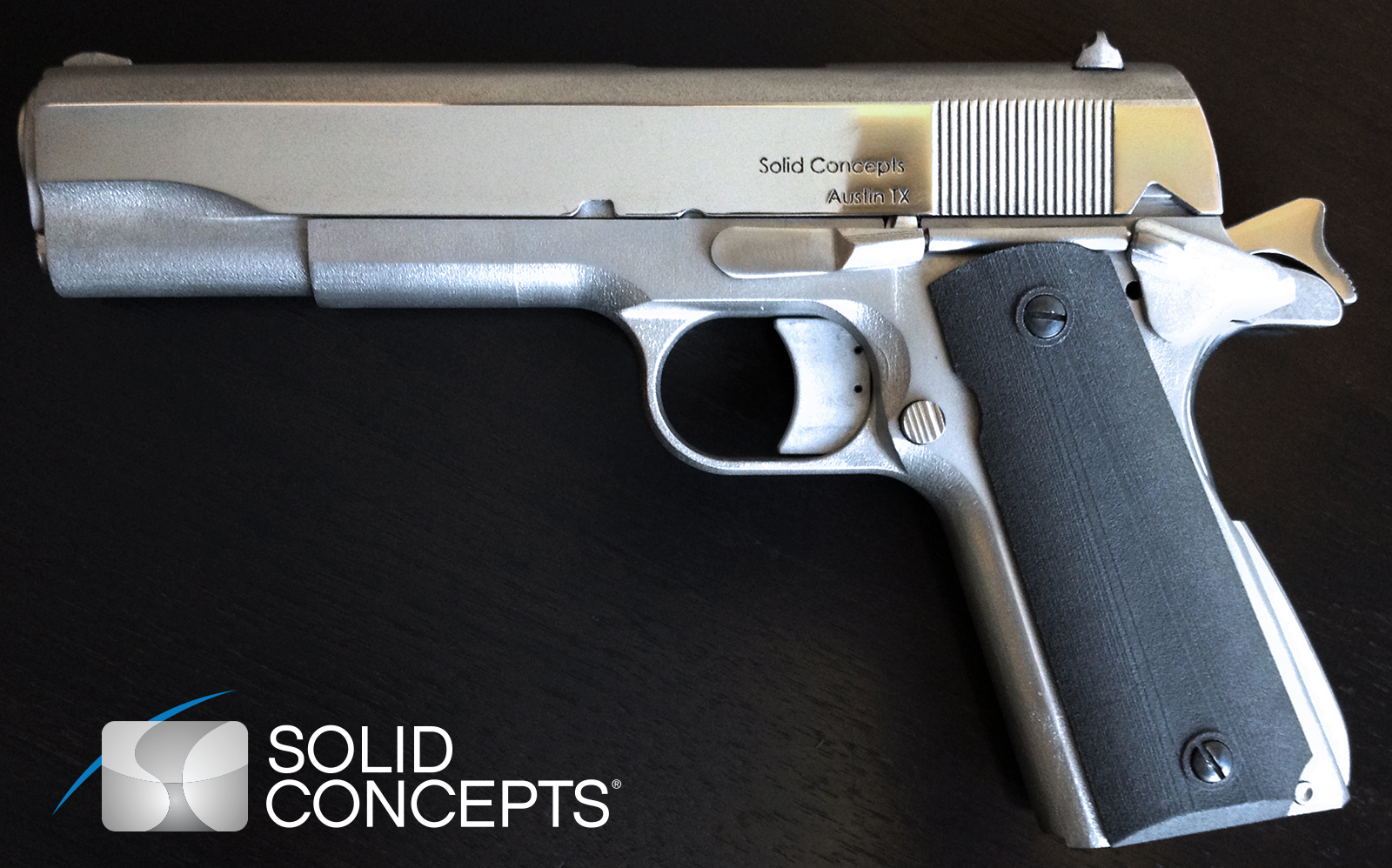
The Solid Concepts 3D printed 1911 pistol

Defense Distributed has also designed a 3D printable AR-15 type rifle lower receiver (capable of lasting more than 650 rounds) and a variety of magazines, including for the AK-47. In 2013 a California company, Solid Concepts, demonstrated a 3D printed version of an M1911 pistol made of metal, using an industrial 3D printer.

== Around the world ==
In the United States, creating an improvised firearm for personal use does not require licensure, registration, a background check, or the stamping of a serial number, but the firearm created must be detectable by a metal detector per federal law. California, however, passed a law in 2016 that requires anyone planning to build a homemade gun to obtain a serial number from the state (de facto registration) and pass a background check. However, such firearms are often illegal in other jurisdictions and are commonly associated with gangs, where they may be used to facilitate violent crime, such as homicide. In other cases, they may be used for other criminal activities not necessarily related to violent crime, such as illegal hunting of game. Improvised firearms are most commonly encountered in regions with restrictive gun control laws. While popular in the United States in the 1950s, the "zip gun" has become less common.

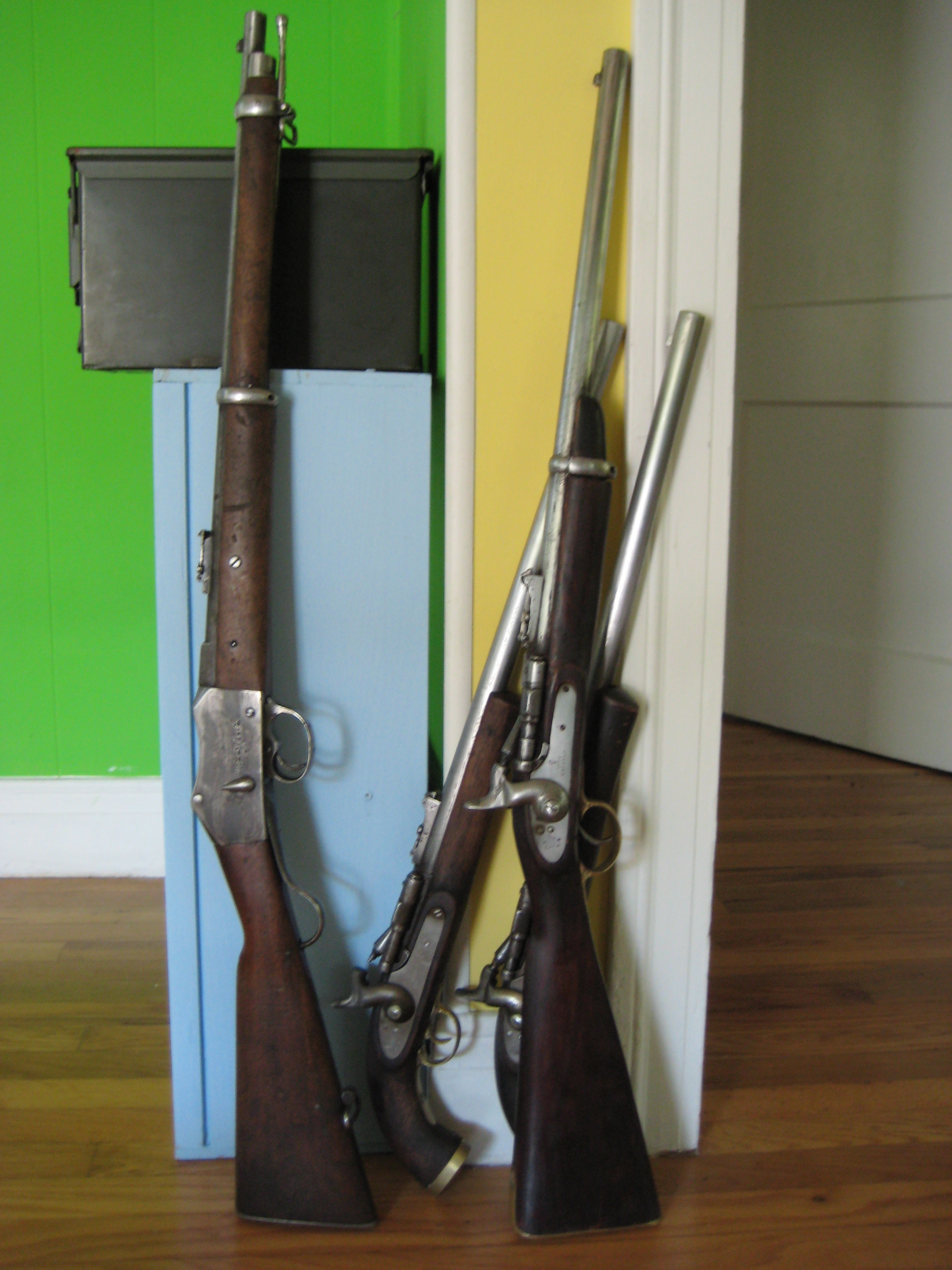
Copies of British Martini and Snider firearms built in the Khyber region

A Khyber Pass copy is a firearm manufactured by cottage gunsmiths in the Khyber Pass region between Pakistan and Afghanistan. The area has long had a reputation for producing unlicensed, homemade copies of firearms using whatever materials are available – more often than not, railway rails, scrap motor vehicles, and other scrap metal. The quality of such firearms varies widely, ranging from as good as a factory-produced example to dangerously poor. Much of the gunsmithing is centered around the town of Darra Adam Khel.

In India, use of improvised country-made pistols is widespread, especially in the regions of Bihar and Purvanchal. The manufacture of these weapons has become a cottage industry, and the components are often manufactured from scrap material; examples include gun barrels fashioned from truck steering columns.

The rebels of the Mau Mau Rebellion (1952–1960) used many different improvised weapons.

In areas like South Africa, improvised firearms are more common. In a study of Zululand District Municipality, South Africa, it was found that most improvised firearms were crude, 12-gauge shotguns, with a simple pull-and-release firing mechanism; like .22 rimfire cartridges, shotgun shells operate at low pressures, making them more suited for use in weak, improvised barrels.

Even in the absence of commercially available ammunition, homemade black powder weapons can be used; such firearms were the subject of a crackdown in the People's Republic of China in 2008. In many areas of Africa, such as Zimbabwe, poachers use improvised muskets and shotguns loaded with black powder stolen from mines.

The city of Danao in Cebu, Philippines, has been making improvised firearms so long that the makers have become legitimate, and are manufacturing firearms for sale. The Danao makers manufacture .38 and .45 caliber revolvers, and semi-automatic copies of the Ingram MAC-10 and Intratec TEC-DC9.

In 2004, an "underground weapons factory" was seized in Melbourne, Australia, yielding among other things a number of silenced copies of the Owen submachine gun, suspected to have been built for sale to local gangs involved in the illegal drug trade.

Improvised firearms have also been used in the Soviet Union by the Tolstopyatov brothers and Russia, where they have been used in domestic homicides and terrorism.

Improvised firearms were used by the perpetrator of the Halle synagogue shooting; the homemade shotgun and "Luty" submachine gun repeatedly malfunctioned. The attacker, an antisemitic neo-Nazi terrorist, said while livestreaming the attack, "I have certainly managed to prove how absurd improvised weapons are."

In Italy, Naples, Caivano, multiple illegal weapons by the notorious Camorra were found during a raid, among them was a homemade 22-caliber gun, 400 homemade shells (likely for another gun such as a lupara, another type of gun that is often homemade), a homemade suppressor, and a pen gun.

In Japan, an improvised shotgun was used in the assassination of Shinzo Abe, former prime minister of Japan, on 8 July 2022.

Improvised firearms were common among the interior Indigenous people in the state of Sabah, Malaysia, where they are known locally as bakakuk and used mainly for the protection of their farms and hunting purposes. In 2015 alone, around 200 homemade bakakuk were confiscated by authorities during a statewide operation for various offences.

== See also ==
- 3D-printed firearm
- Barrack busters
- Charles Fraser-Smith
- Improvised artillery in the Syrian civil war
- Improvised explosive device
- Improvised mortars
- Improvised weapon
- Insurgency weapon
- Marble gun
- Narco tank
- Philip Luty
- Privately made firearm
- Research and Development Branch
- Technical (vehicle)
- TM 31-210 Improvised Munitions Handbook
