= Chechens =

Northeast Caucasian ethnic group

Нохчий Noxçiy
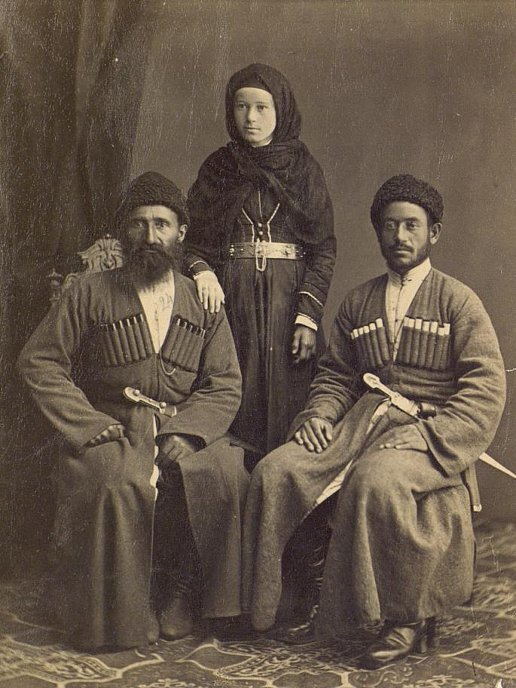
- Chechens in Georgia wearing traditional clothing including chokha, c. 1870s

Total population
- 2.2 million (Note: The total figure is merely an estimation; sum of all the referenced populations only.)

Regions with significant populations
- Russia: 1,674,854
- Chechnya: 1,456,792
- Dagestan: 99,320
- Rostov Oblast: 14,316
- Stavropol Krai: 13,779
- Ingushetia: 12,240
- Moscow Oblast: 11,491
- Volgograd Oblast: 8,038
- Khanty-Mansia: 7,085
- Astrakhan Oblast: 6,873
- Saratov Oblast: 5,748
- European Union: 130,000
- Turkey: 100,000
- Kazakhstan: 33,557
- Iraq: 14,000
- Jordan: 12,000–30,000
- Norway: 10,000
- Syria: 6,000–35,000
- Georgia: 5,829 (including Kists)
- Azerbaijan: 5,300
- Egypt: 5,000
- Ukraine: 2,877
- United Arab Emirates: 2,000–3,000
- Kyrgyzstan: 1,709
- Finland: 891
- United States: 250–1,000 (Note: The actual number of Chechens living in the United States may be higher, as they are categorized as Russians in censuses.)
- Latvia: 136–189

Languages
- Chechen

Religion
- Sunni Islam

Related ethnic groups
- Other Nakh peoples (Ingush, Bats)

The Chechens, (Note: /ˈtʃɛtʃɛnz, tʃəˈtʃɛnz/ CHETCH-enz, chə-CHENZ; Chechen: Нохчий, romanized: Noxçiy, IPA: [ˈno̞xtʃiː]; Old Chechen: Нахчой, Naxçoy) historically also known as Kisti and Durdzuks, are a Northeast Caucasian ethnic group of the Nakh peoples native to the North Caucasus. They are the largest ethnic group in the region and refer to themselves as Nokhchiy. The vast majority of Chechens are Muslims and live in Chechnya, a republic within the Russian Federation.

The North Caucasus region has been invaded numerous times throughout history. Its isolated terrain and the strategic value outsiders have placed on the areas settled by Chechens has contributed much to the Chechen community ethos and helped shape its national character.

Chechen society is largely egalitarian and organized around tribal autonomous local clans, called teips, informally organized into loose confederations called tukkhums.

== Etymology ==
=== Chechen ===
According to popular tradition, the Russian term Chechency (Чеченцы) comes from central Chechnya, which had several important villages and towns named after the word Chechen. These places include Chechan, Nana-Checha ('Mother Checha') and Yokkh Chechen ('Greater Chechena'). The name Chechen occurs in Russian sources in the late 16th century as "Chachana", which is mentioned as a land owned by the Chechen prince Shikh Murza. Its etymology is of Nakh origin and derives from the word che ('inside') attached to the suffix -cha(n); the word Chechen can thus be translated as 'inside territory'. The villages and towns named Chechan were always situated in the Chechen plains (Chechan-are) located in contemporary central Chechnya.

The name "Chechens" is an exoethnonym that entered the Georgian and Western European ethnonymic tradition through the Russian language in the 18th century.

From the middle of the 19th century to the first years of the Soviet state, some researchers grouped all Chechens and Ingush under the name "Chechens". In modern scholarship, another term is used for this community: the Vainakh.

=== Nokhchiy ===
Although Chechan (Chechen) was a term used by Chechens to denote a certain geographic area (central Chechnya), Chechens called themselves Nakhchiy (highland dialects) or Nokhchiy (lowland dialects). The oldest mention of Nakhchiy occurred in 1310 by the Georgian Patriarch Cyril Donauri, who mentions the 'People of Nakhche' among Tushetians, Avars and many other Northeast Caucasian nations. The term Nakhchiy has also been connected to the city Nakhchivan and the nation of Nakhchamatyan (mentioned as one of the peoples of Sarmatia in the 7th-century Armenian work Ashkharhatsuyts) by many Soviet and modern historians, although the historian N. Volkova considers the latter connection unlikely and states that the term Nakhchmatyan could have been mistaken for the Iaxamatae, a tribe of Sarmatia mentioned in Ptolemy's Geography, who have no connection to the Chechen people. Chechen manuscripts in Arabic from the early 1820s do mention a certain Nakhchuvan (near modern-day Kağızman, Turkey) as the homeland of all Nakhchiy. The etymology of the term Nakhchiy can also be understood as a compound formed with nakh ('people') attached to chö ('territory, room').

== Geography and diaspora ==
The Chechens are mainly inhabitants of Chechnya. There are also significant Chechen populations in other subdivisions of Russia, especially in Aukh (part of modern-day Dagestan), Ingushetia and Moscow.

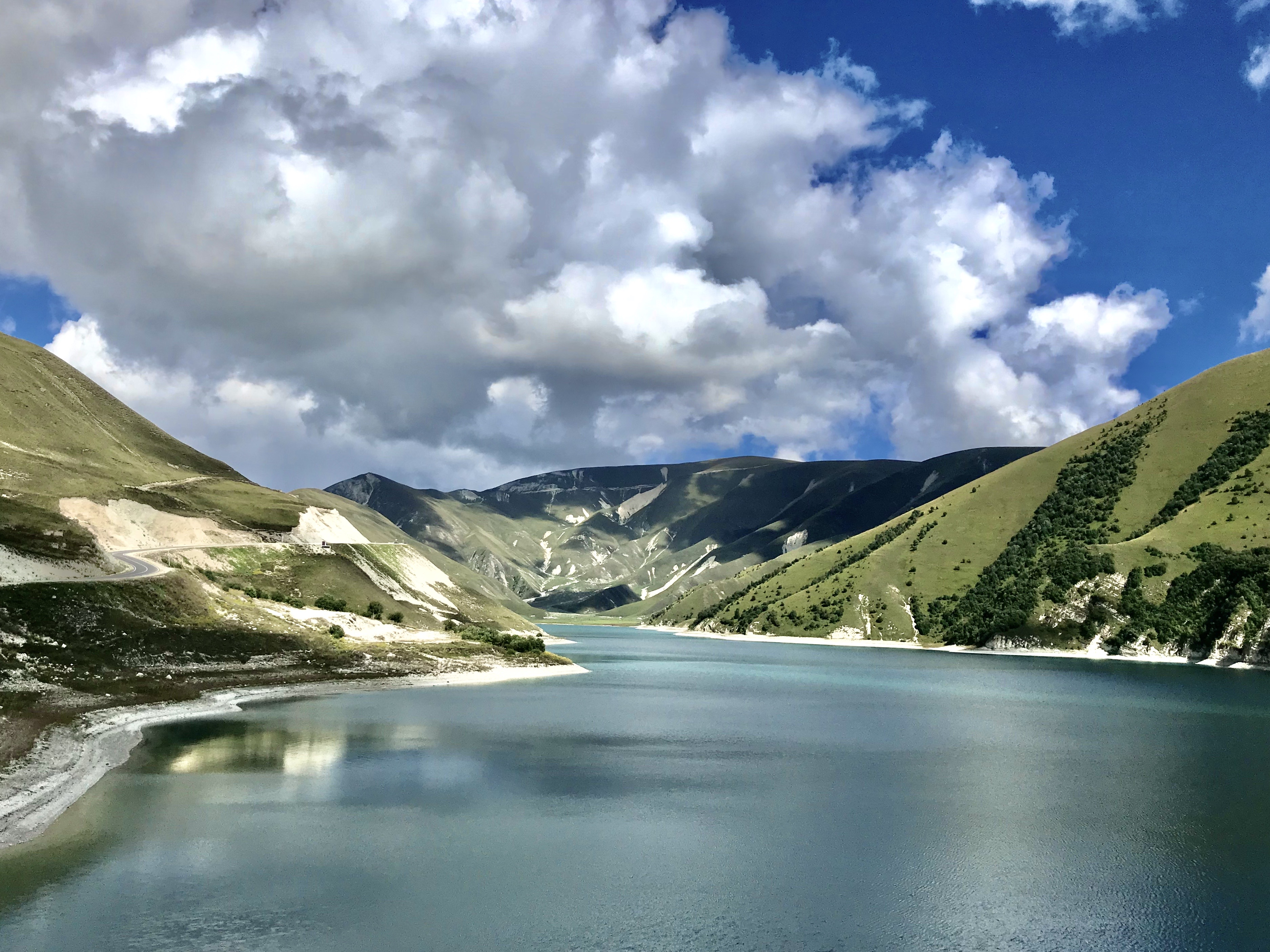
Lake Kezenoyam, Chechnya

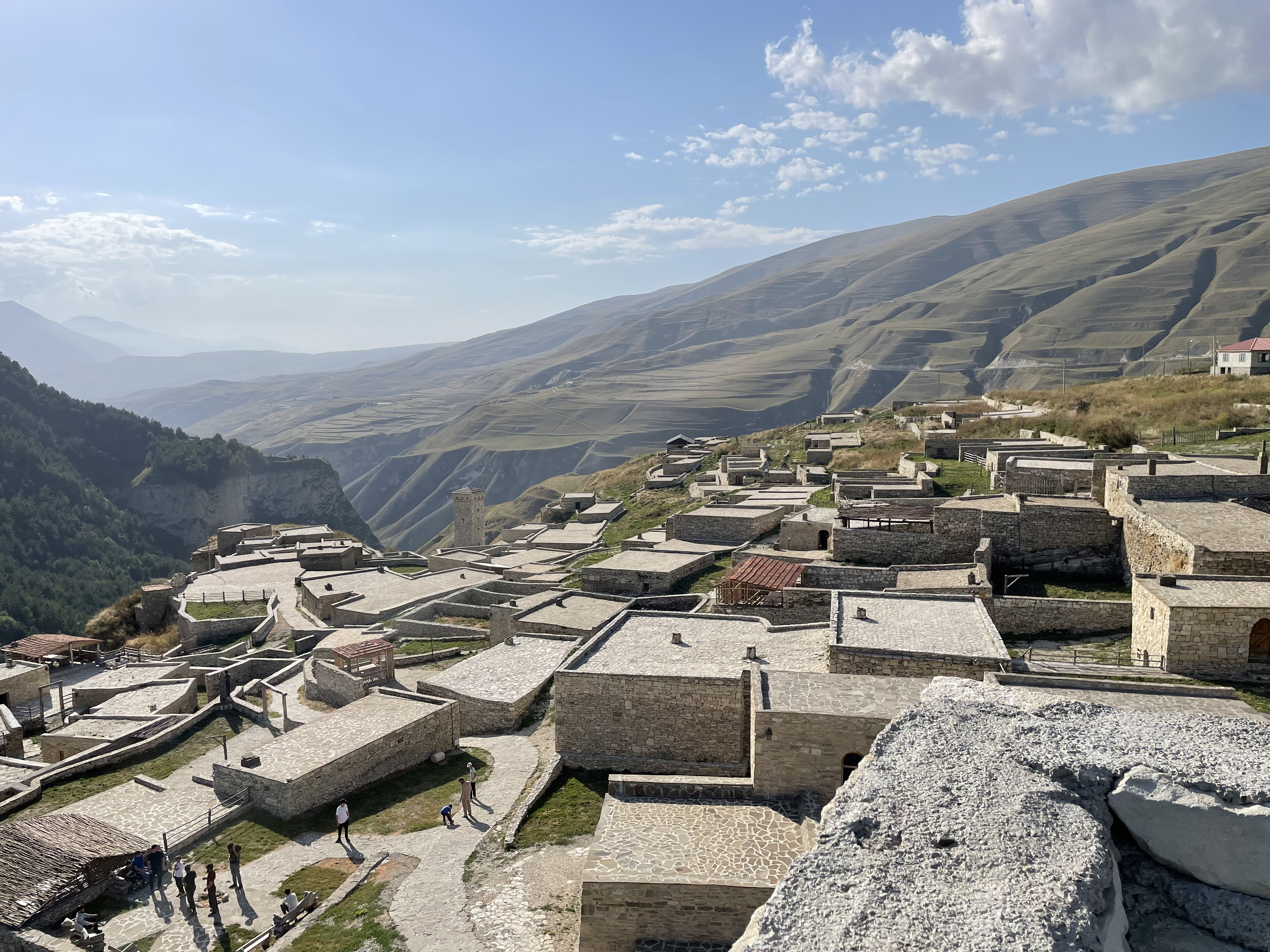
Khoy, Chechnya

Outside Russia, countries with significant diaspora populations are Kazakhstan, Turkey and Arab states (especially Jordan and Iraq). Those in Turkey, Iraq, and Jordan are mainly descendants of families who had to leave Chechnya during the Caucasus War, which led to the annexation of Chechnya by the Russian Empire in 1859, and the forcible transfer of Chechens from Terek Oblast to the Ottoman Empire in 1865. Those in Kazakhstan originate from the ethnic cleansing of the entire population carried out by Joseph Stalin and Lavrentiy Beria in 1944. Tens of thousands of Chechen refugees settled in the European Union and elsewhere as the result of the recent Chechen Wars, especially in the wave of emigration to the West after 2002.

== History ==
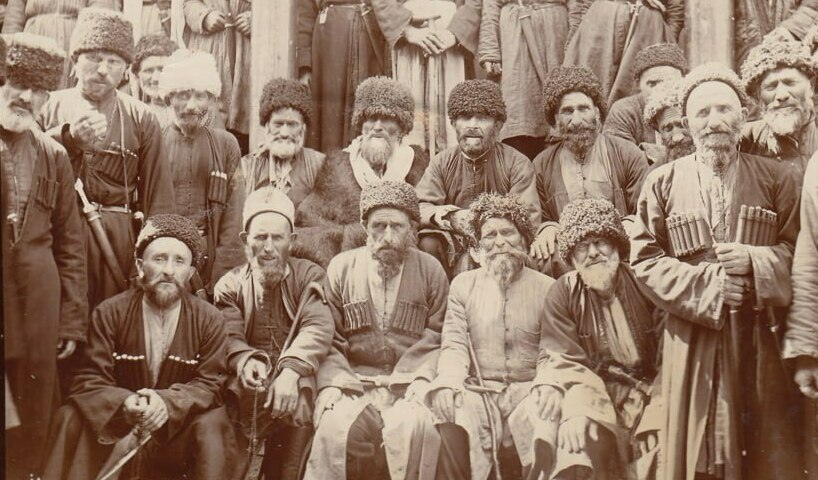
Chechen elders from the clan (teip) Zumsoy

=== Prehistory and origin ===
The Chechens are one of the Nakh peoples, who have lived in the highlands of the North Caucasus region since prehistory. There is archeological evidence of historical continuity dating back to 3000 B.C., as well as evidence pointing to their ancestors' migration from the Fertile Crescent c. 10,000–8,000 B.C.

The discussion of their origins is intertwined with the discussion of the mysterious origins of Nakh peoples as a whole. The only three surviving Nakh peoples are Chechens, Ingush and Bats, but they are thought by some scholars to be the remnants of what was once a larger family of peoples.

They are thought to be descended from the original settlers of the Caucasus (North and/or South).

=== Antiquity ===
Ancestors of the modern Chechens and Ingush were known as Durdzuks. According to The Georgian Chronicles, before his death, Targamos [Togarmah] divided the country amongst his sons, with Kavkasos [Caucas] receiving the Central Caucasus. Kavkasos engendered the Chechen tribes, and his descendant, Durdzuk, who took up residence in a mountainous region, later called "Dzurdzuketia" after him, established a strong state in the fourth and third centuries BC. Among the Chechen teips, the teip Zurzakoy, consonant with the ethnonym Dzurdzuk, lives in the Itum-Kale region of Chechnya.

Georgian historian Giorgi Melikishvili posited that although there was evidence of Nakh settlement in the Southern Caucasus areas, this did not rule out the possibility that they also lived in the North Caucasus.

The state of Durdzuketi has been recorded since the 4th century BC. The Armenian Chronicles mention that the Durdzuks defeated the Scythians and became a significant power in the region in the first millennium BC.

The Vainakh in the east had an affinity with Georgia, while the Malkh Kingdom of the west looked to the new Greek kingdom of Bosporus on the Black Sea coast (though it may have also had relations with Georgia). According to legend, Adermalkh, chief of the Malkh state, married the daughter of the Bosporan king in 480 BCE. Malkhi is one of the Chechen tukkhums.

=== Medieval ===
During the Middle Ages, the lowland of Chechnya was dominated by the Khazars and then the Alans. Local culture was also subject to Georgian influence and some Chechens converted to Eastern Orthodox Christianity. With a presence dating back to the 14th century, Islam gradually spread among the Chechens, although the Chechens' own pagan religion was still strong until the 19th century. Society was organised along feudal lines. Chechnya was devastated by the Mongol invasions of the 13th century and those of Tamerlane in the 14th. The Mongol invasions are well known in Chechen folktales which are often connected with military reports of Alan-Dzurdzuk wars against the Mongols.

According to the missionary Giovanni da Pian del Carpine, a part of the Alans had successfully resisted a Mongol siege on a mountain for 12 years:

When they (the Mongols) begin to besiege a fortress, they besiege it for many years, as it happens today with one mountain in the land of the Alans. We believe they have been besieging it for twelve years and they (the Alans) put up courageous resistance and killed many Tatars, including many noble ones.

— Giovanni da Pian del Carpine, report from 1250

This twelve-year-old siege is not found in any other report, however, the Russian historian A. I. Krasnov connected this battle with two Chechen folktales he recorded in 1967 that spoke of an old hunter named Idig who with his companions defended the Dakuoh mountain for 12 years against Tatar-Mongols. He also reported to have found several arrowheads and spears from the 13th century near the very mountain the battle took place at:

The next year, with the onset of summer, the enemy hordes came again to destroy the highlanders. But even this year they failed to capture the mountain, on which the brave Chechens settled down. The battle lasted twelve years. The main wealth of the Chechens – livestock – was stolen by the enemies. Tired of the long years of hard struggle, the Chechens, believing the assurances of mercy by the enemy, descended from the mountain, but the Mongol-Tatars treacherously killed the majority, and the rest were taken into slavery. This fate was escaped only by Idig and a few of his companions who did not trust the nomads and remained on the mountain. They managed to escape and leave Mount Dakuoh after 12 years of siege.

— Amin Tesaev, The Legend and struggle of the Chechen hero Idig (1238–1250)

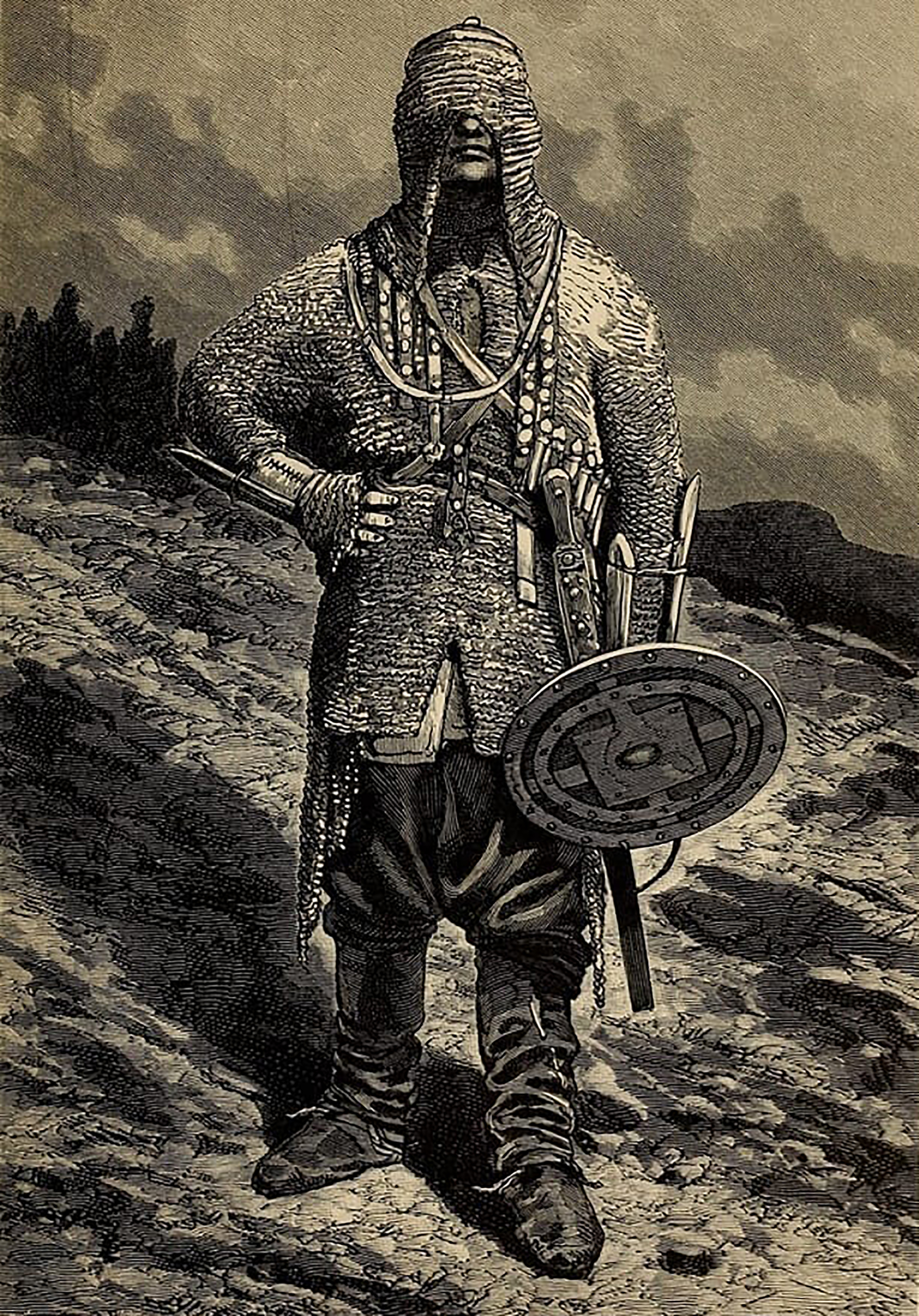
Chechen warrior

Tamerlane's late 14th-century invasions of the Caucasus were especially costly to the Chechen kingdom of Simsir which was an ally of the Golden Horde and anti-Timurid. Its leader Khour Ela supported Khan Tokhtamysh during the Battle of the Terek River. The Chechens bear the distinction of being one of the few peoples to successfully resist the Mongols and defend themselves against their invasions; not once, but twice, though this came at great cost to them, as their states were utterly destroyed. These events were key in the shaping of the Chechen nationhood and their martial-oriented and clan-based society.

=== Early modern period ===
The Caucasus was a major competing area for two neighboring rival empires: the Ottoman and Turco-Persian empires (Safavids, Afsharids, Qajars). Starting from 1555 and decisively from 1639 through the first half of the 19th century, the Caucasus was divided by these two powers, with the Ottomans prevailing in Western Georgia, while Persia kept the bulk of the Caucasus, namely Eastern Georgia, Southern Dagestan, Azerbaijan, and Armenia. The Chechens, however, never really fell under the rule of either empire. As Russia expanded slowly southwards as early as the 16th century, clashes between Chechens and Russians became more frequent, and it became three empires competing for the region. During these turbulent times, the Chechens were organized into semi-independent clans that were loyal to the Mehk-Khel (National Council). The Mehk-Khel was in charge of appointing the Mehk-Da (ruler of the nation). Several of these appeared during the early modern period such as Aldaman Gheza, Tinavin-Visa, Zok-K'ant and others. The administration and military expeditions commanded by Aldaman Gheza during the 1650–1670s led to Chechnya being largely untouched by the major empires of the time. Alliances were concluded with local lords against Persian encroachment and battles were fought to stop Russian influence. One such battle was the Battle of Khachara between Gheza and the rival Avar Khanate that tried to exert influence on Chechnya. As Russia set off to increase its political influence in the Caucasus and the Caspian Sea at the expense of Safavid Persia, Peter I launched the Russo-Persian War, in which Russia succeeded in taking much of the Caucasian territories for several years. The conflict notably marked the first military encounter between Imperial Russia and the Chechens. Sheikh Mansur led a major Chechen resistance movement in the late 18th century.

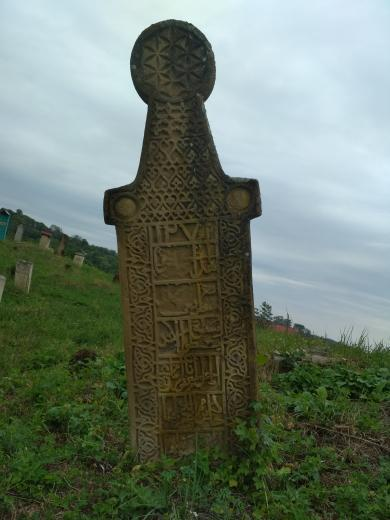
Tomb of a Chechen warrior of the 19th century

In the late 18th and 19th centuries, Russia embarked on full-scale conquest of the North Caucasus in the Caucasian War. Much of the campaign was led by General Yermolov who particularly disliked the Chechens, describing them as "a bold and dangerous people". Angered by Chechen raids, Yermolov resorted to a brutal policy of "scorched earth" and deportations; he also founded the fort of Grozny (now the capital of Chechnya) in 1818. Chechen resistance to Russian rule reached its peak under the leadership of the Dagestani leader Imam Shamil. The Chechens were finally defeated in 1861 after a bloody war that lasted for decades, during which they lost most of their entire population. In the aftermath, large numbers of refugees also emigrated or were forcibly deported to the Ottoman Empire.

=== Nineteenth and twentieth centuries ===
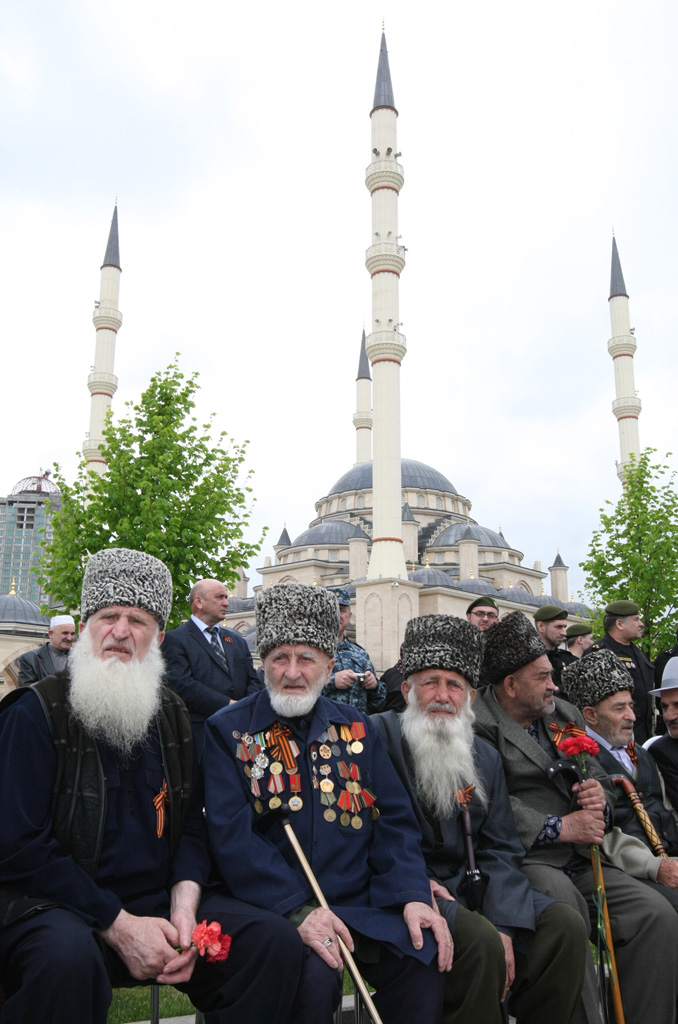
Chechen veterans of the Great Patriotic War

Since then, there have been various Chechen rebellions against Russian/Soviet power in 1865–66, 1877, during the Russian Civil War and World War II, as well as nonviolent resistance to Russification and the Soviet Union's collectivization and anti-religion campaigns. In 1944, all Chechens, together with several other peoples of the Caucasus, were ordered by the Soviet leader Joseph Stalin to be deported en masse to the Kazakh and Kirghiz SSRs; and their republic and nation were abolished. At least one-quarter—and perhaps half—of the entire Chechen population perished in the process, and a severe blow was made to their culture and historical records. Though "rehabilitated" in 1956 and allowed to return the next year, the survivors lost economic resources and civil rights and, under both Soviet and post-Soviet governments, they have been the objects of both official and unofficial discrimination and discriminatory public discourse. Chechen attempts to regain independence in the 1990s after the fall of the Soviet Union led to the first and the second war with the new Russian state, starting in 1994.

== Language ==
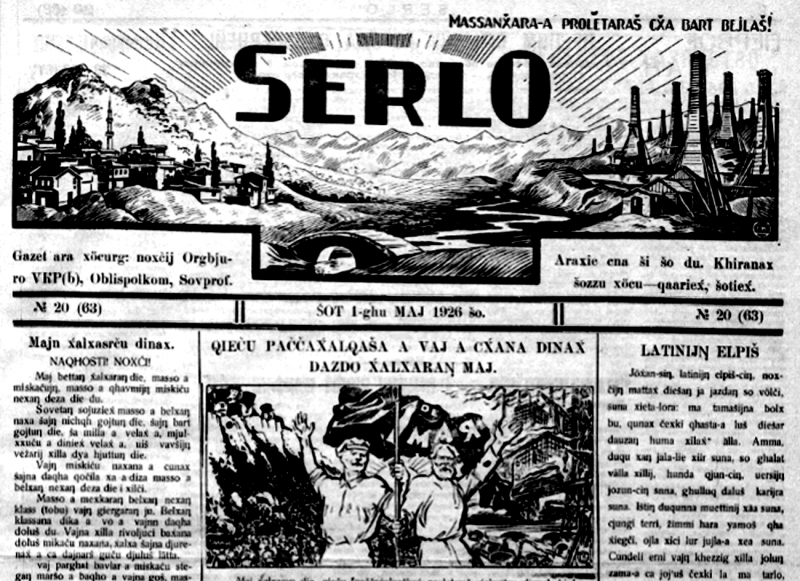
Chechen-Soviet newspaper, Serlo (light), written in the Chechen Latin script during Korenizatsiya.

The main language of the Chechen people is Chechen. Chechen belongs to the family of Nakh languages (Northeast Caucasian languages). Literary Chechen is based on the central lowland dialect. Other related languages include Ingush, which has speakers in the neighbouring Ingushetia, and Batsbi, which is the language of the people in the adjoining part of Georgia. At various times in their history, Chechens used Georgian, Arabic and Latin alphabets; as of 2008, the official script is Russian Cyrillic. Traditionally, linguists attributed both Ingush and Batsbi to the Chechen language (as its dialects) before the endoethnonym Vainakh appeared at the beginning of the 20th century.

Most Chechens living in their homeland can understand Ingush with ease. The two languages are not truly mutually intelligible, but it is easy for Chechens to learn how to understand the Ingush language and vice versa over time after hearing it for a while.

In 1989, 73.4% spoke Russian, though this figure has declined due to the wars for a large number of reasons (including the lack of proper education, the refusal to learn the language, and the mass dispersal of the Chechen diaspora due to the war). Chechens in the diaspora often speak the language of the country they live in (English, French, German, Arabic, Polish, Georgian, Turkish, etc.).

The Nakh languages are a subgroup of Northeast Caucasian, and as such are related to Nakho-Dagestanian family, including the languages of the Avars, Dargins, Lezghins, Laks, Rutulians, etc. However, this relationship is not a close one: the Nakho-Dagestanian family is of comparable or greater time-depth than Indo-European, meaning Chechens are only as linguistically related to Avars or Dargins as the French are to the Russians or Iranians.

Some researchers suggest a linguistic relationship between the Nakh-Dagestani languages and the Urarto-Hurrians.

Other scholars, however, doubt that the language families are related, or believe that, while a connection is possible, the evidence is far from conclusive. Uralicist and Indo-Europeanist Petri Kallio argues that the matter is hindered by the lack of consensus about how to reconstruct Proto-Northeast-Caucasian, but that Alarodian is the most promising proposal for relations with Northeast Caucasian, greater than rival proposals to link it with Northwest Caucasian or other families. However, nothing is known about Alarodians except that they "were armed like the Colchians and Saspeires," according to Herodotus. Colchians and Saspeires are generally associated with Kartvelians or Scythians. Additionally, leading Urartologist Paul Zimansky rejected a connection between Urartians and Alarodians.

== Genetics ==
Genetic tests on Chechens have shown roots mostly in the Caucasus and Europe. Studies on North Caucasian mtDNA indicated a closer relationship of the Caucasus with Europe (Nasidze et al. 2001), while the Y chromosome indicated a closer relationship with West Asia (Nasidze et al. 2003).

A 2004 study of the mtDNA showed Chechens to be diverse in the mitochondrial genome, with 18 different haplogroups out of only 23 samples. This correlates with all other North Caucasian peoples such as the Ingush, Avars, and Circassians where the mitochondrial DNA is very diverse.

The most recent study on Chechens, by Balanovsky et al. in 2011, sampled a total of 330 Chechen males from three sample locations (one in Malgobek, one in Achkhoy-Martan, and one from two sites in Dagestan) and found that an absolute majority of Chechens belong to Haplogroup J2 (56.7%), which is associated with Mediterranean, Caucasian and Fertile Crescent populations. Other notable values were found among North Caucasian Turkic peoples (Kumyks (25%) and Balkars (24%)). It was also noted that the rate of J2 was significantly lower in the territory of non-Nakh Northeast Caucasian peoples, dropping to very low values among Dagestani peoples. The overwhelming bulk of Chechen J2 is of the subclade J2a4b* (J2-M67), of which the highest frequencies by far are found among Nakh peoples: Chechens were 55.2% according to the Balanovsky study, while Ingush were 87.4%. Other notable haplogroups that consistently appeared at high frequencies included J1 (20.9%), L (7.0%), G2 (5.5%), R1a (3.9%), Q-M242 (3%) and R1b-M269 (1.8%, but much higher in Chechnya itself as opposed to Dagestani or Ingushetian Chechens). Overall, tests have shown consistently that Chechens are most closely related to Ingush, Circassians and other North Caucasians, occasionally showing a kinship to other peoples in some tests. Balanovsky's study showed the Ingush to be the Chechens' closest relatives by far.

Russian military historian and Lieutenant General Vasily Potto describes the appearance of the Chechens as follows: "The Chechen is handsome and strong. Tall, brunette, slender, with sharp features and a quick, determined look, he amazes with his mobility, agility, dexterity."

According to a 2021 Rosstat study, Chechnya ranked as the tallest region in Russia for men (179.1 cm) and second tallest for women (168.2).

== Culture ==
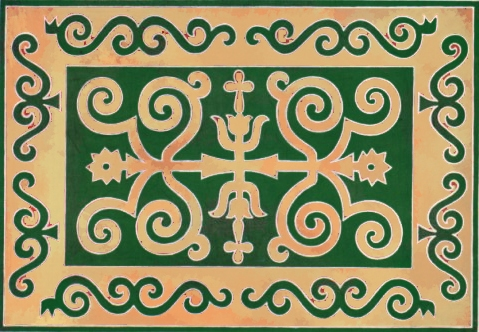
Istang, a type of woven Chechen carpet

Prior to the adoption of Islam, the Chechens practiced a unique blend of religious traditions and beliefs. Their code of honor is known as quonahalla. They partook in numerous rites and rituals, many of them pertaining to farming; these included rain rites, a celebration that occurred on the first day of plowing, as well as the Day of the Thunderer Sela and the Day of the Goddess Tusholi. In addition to sparse written record from the Middle Ages, Chechens traditionally remember history through the illesh, a collection of epic poems and stories.

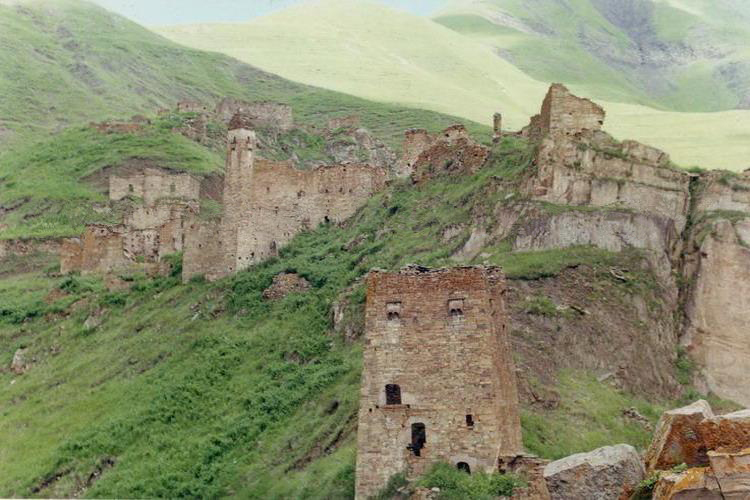
An example of Chechen tower architecture, ruins of the medieval settlement of Nikaroy

Chechens are accustomed to democratic ways, their social structure being firmly based on equality, pluralism and deference to individuality. Chechen society is structured around tukkhums (unions of clans) and about 130 teips, or clans. The teips are based more on land and one-side lineage than on blood (as exogamy is prevalent and encouraged), and are bonded together to form the Chechen nation. Teips are further subdivided into gar (branches), and gars into nekye (patronymic families). The Chechen social code is called nokhchallah (where Nokhchuo stands for "Chechen") and may be loosely translated as "Chechen character". The Chechen code of honor and customary law (adat) implies moral and ethical behaviour, generosity and the will to safeguard the honor of women. The traditional Chechen saying goes that the members of Chechen society, like its teips, are (ideally) "free and equal like wolves".

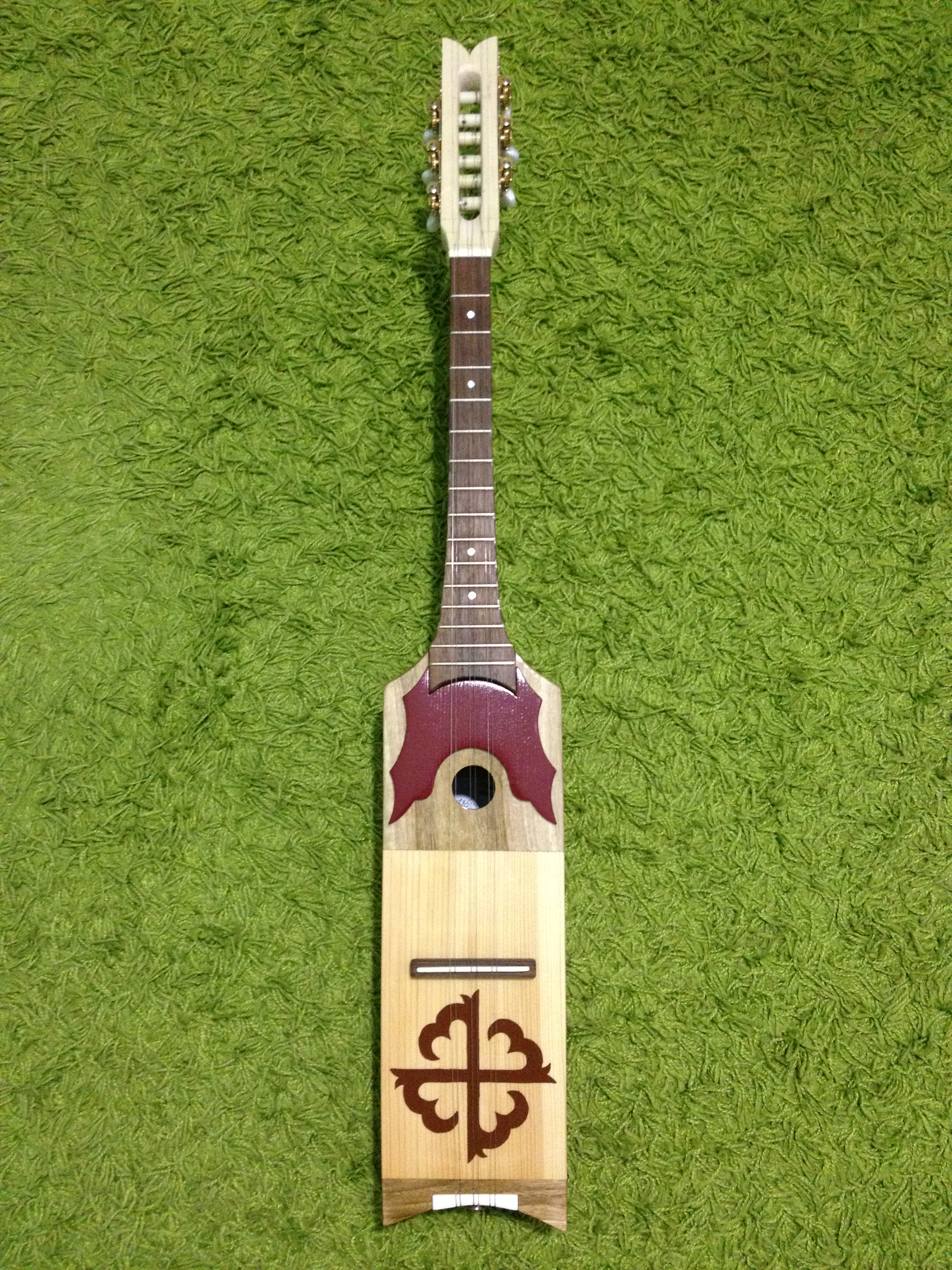
A phandar, a traditional Chechen musical instrument

Chechens have a strong sense of community, which is enforced by the old clan network and nokhchalla – the obligation to clan, tukkhum, etc. This is often combined with old values transmuted into a modern sense. They are mythically descended from the epic hero, Turpalo-Nokhchuo ("Chechen Hero"). There is a strong theme of representing the nation with its national animal, the wolf. Due to their strong dependence on the land, its farms and its forests (and indeed, the national equation with the wolf), Chechens have a strong affection for nature. According to Chechen philosopher Apty Bisultanov, ruining an ant-hill or hunting Caucasian goats during their mating season was considered extremely sinful. The glasnost era Chechen independence movement Bart (unity) originated as a simple environmentalist organization in the republic's capital of Grozny.

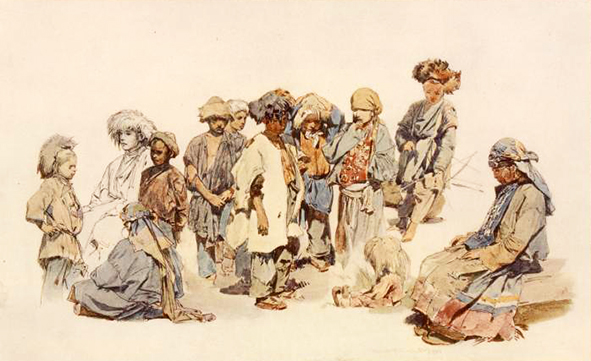
Chechen kids by Theodor Horschelt, 1858

Chechen culture strongly values freedom. This asserts itself in multiple ways. A large majority of the nation's national heroes fought for independence (or otherwise, like the legendary Zelimkhan, robbed from the Russian oppressors in order to feed Chechen children in a Robin Hood-like fashion). A common greeting in the Chechen language, marsha oylla, is literally translated as "enter in freedom". The word for freedom also encompasses notions of peace and prosperity.

== Religion ==
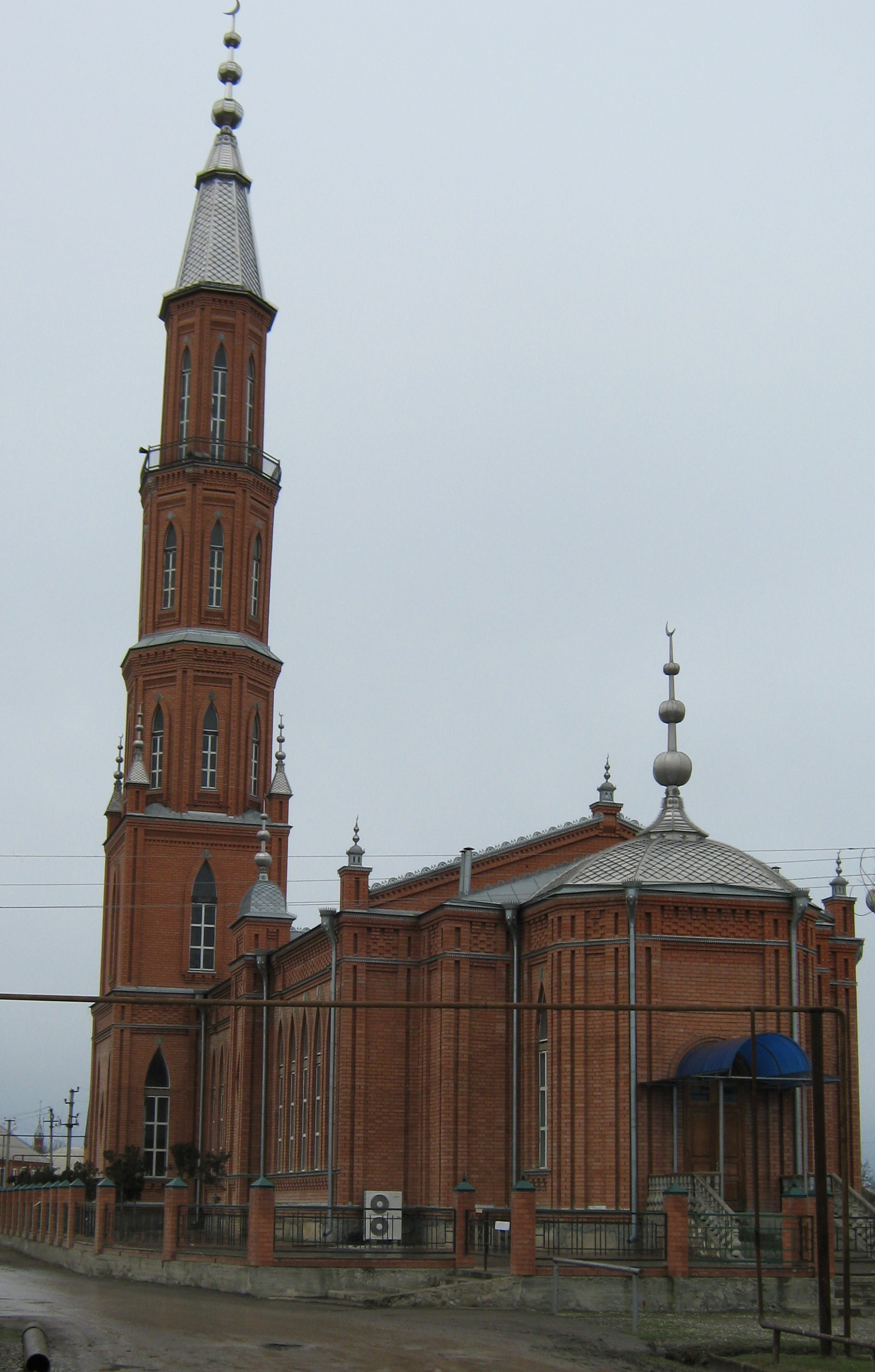
Chechen Mosque Architecture

Chechnya is predominantly Sunni Muslim. Most of the population follows either the Shafi'i or the Hanafi schools of jurisprudence, fiqh. The Shafi'i school has a long tradition among the Chechens, and thus it remains the most practiced. Some adhere to the mystical Sufi tradition of muridism, while about half of Chechens belong to Sufi brotherhoods, or tariqah. The two Sufi tariqas that spread in the North Caucasus were the Naqshbandiyya and the Qadiriyya (the Naqshbandiyya is particularly strong in Dagestan and eastern Chechnya, whereas the Qadiriyya has most of its adherents in the rest of Chechnya and Ingushetia).

A stereotype of an average Chechen being a fundamentalist Muslim is incorrect and misleading. By the late 2000s, however, two new trends have emerged in Chechnya. A radicalized remnant of the armed Chechen separatist movement has become dominated by Salafis (popularly known in Russia as Wahhabis and present in Chechnya in small numbers since the 1990s), mostly abandoning nationalism in favor of Pan-Islamism and merging with several other regional Islamic insurgencies to form the Caucasus Emirate. At the same time, Chechnya under Moscow-backed authoritarian rule of Ramzan Kadyrov has undergone its own controversial counter-campaign of Islamization of the republic, with the government and the Spiritual Administration of the Muslims of the Chechen Republic actively promoting and enforcing their own version of a so-called "traditional Islam", including introducing elements of Sharia that replaced Russian official laws.

== See also ==
- List of Chechen people
- Teip (Nakh clans)
- Nakh peoples
- North Caucasian peoples
- Islam in Russia
- Chechens in Jordan
- Chechens in Syria
- Chechens in Turkey
- Chechens in Iraq
- Chechens in France

== Sources ==
- Dunlop, John B. (1998). Russia Confronts Chechnya: Roots of a Separatist Conflict. Cambridge University Press.
- Ilyasov, Lechi (2009). The Diversity of the Chechen Culture: From Historical Roots to the Present. Moscow (in Russian).
- Hamed-Troyansky, Vladimir (2024). Empire of Refugees: North Caucasian Muslims and the Late Ottoman State. Stanford, CA: Stanford University Press. ISBN 978-1-5036-3696-5.
- Jaimoukha, Amjad (2005). The Chechens: A Handbook. London; New York: Routledge.
- Plaetschke, Bruno (1929). Die Tschetschenen: Forschungen zur Völkerkunde des nordöstlichen Kaukasus auf Grund von Reisen in den Jahren 1918—20 und 1927/28 [The Chechens]. Veröffentlichungen des Geographischen Instituts der Universität Königsberg Pr., 11 (in German). Hamburg: Friedrichsen, de Gruyter & Co m. b. H.
- Roshchin, Mikhail; Lunkin, Roman (2005). "Ислам в Чеченской Республике" [Islam in the Chechen Republic]. In Bourdeaux, Michael; Filatov, Sergei (eds.). Современная религиозная жизнь России. Опыт систематического описания [Contemporary Religious Life of Russia. Systematic description experience] (in Russian). Vol. 3. Moscow: Keston Institute; Logos. pp. 152–169. ISBN 5-98704-044-2.
