= Quonahalla =

Chechen ethical code

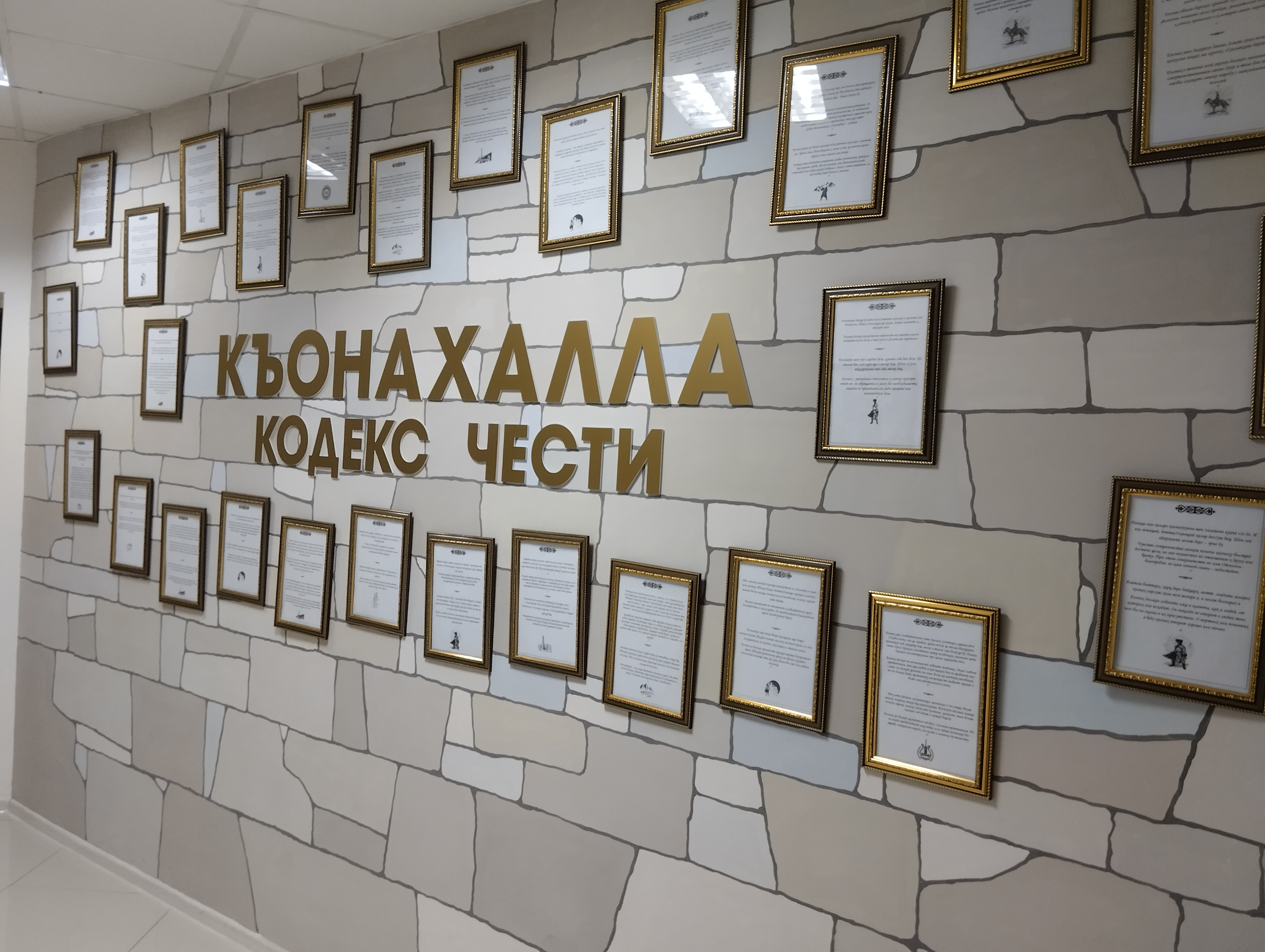
Exhibition in the Republican Children's Library of the Chechen Republic, dedicated to the Chechen etiquette

Quonahalla (Chechen: Къо́нахалла, къонах (quonah) – "a worthy man") is the Chechen ethic code. It is one of three Chechen codes, the other two being Adamalla (humanity) and Nokhchalla (national moral code).

== Origin ==
There are suggestions that the code was formed in the Alanian era (5th–13th centuries). The characteristics of the code were influenced by the events of the time when war was a normal state for the Nakh peoples. The antiquity of the code is evidenced by numerous parallels with the most ancient monuments of the Nart saga.

The final form of the code was formed in the Late Middle Ages. At a later time, the spiritual aspect of the code was strongly influenced by Sufism, according to which the main meaning of human existence is the path of spiritual perfection. However, unlike Sufism, the quonah was not obliged to renounce earthly joys and participation in socio-political life.

According to legend, the code was first recorded in religious and ethical treatises of the 17th-18th centuries. Until now, the code has come down in fragmentary form in the chronicles and oral tradition.

== Etymology ==
The word quonah (Chechen: къонах), comes from the word quona (Chechen: къона) – "young" – and has the meaning "well done" or "worthy person". Another ancient word quano (къано) – "the elder, the elected representative of the people, the sage" – comes from quena (къена) – "old".

== Laws ==
1. The law of hospitality is sacred. A quonah who fails to protect his guest is doomed to shame and contempt. Therefore, the life and freedom of the guest is dearer to him than his own life. But he is not responsible for the guest who committed the crime.
2. Tolerance and respect for foreign traditions In a foreign country, a quonah must not only observe its laws, but also respect customs and traditions and follow them to the extent that this does not offend his national dignity and religious convictions.
3. Service to the Fatherland A quonah must remember that for him the Fatherland, personal dignity and honor are dearer than life.
4. Tear of a child Never cause pain and suffering to children. Beating a defenseless creature is a crime.
5. Environmental consciousness To treat all living things with respect and compassion. Never unnecessarily cut down a tree, never break a blade of grass and never harm any living being.

== See also ==
- Chechen language
- Chechnya

== Sources ==
- Zubairaeva, Zarikhan (2012). "Quonahalla" - as the spiritual basis of rebirth. Information agency. www.ChechnyaTODAY.com
- Ilyasov, Lecha. Code of Quonahalla. nohchalla.com
- Five laws from the code of the Chechen "samurai". etokavkaz.ru
