= Bakakuk =

Improvised firearms of the indigenous people in Sabah, Malaysia

- Type: Improvised firearm home-made shotgun
- Place of origin: Sabah, Malaysia

Service history
- Used by: Indigenous Dusun, Kadazan, Murut, and Rungus

Production history
- Unit cost: RM197–RM1,184.85 (US$50–US$300)

Specifications
- Length: 45 centimetres (1.48 ft) to 65 centimetres (2.13 ft)

Bakakuk, bakakok, or bakakung is a type of indigenous improvised firearm, a homemade shotgun commonly used by the indigenous people of Sabah in Malaysian Borneo to hunt wild animals within their ancestral lands and protect their farms.

== Background and use ==
The bakakuk is a homemade close-range improvised firearm, commonly used by the indigenous in the interior part of Sabah since the period of British North Borneo, mainly for the purposes of protecting indigenous farms and hunting wild animals, such as wild boar, deer, tapir, and birds. It is considered common and "customary" in rural contexts among the indigenous community and the most easily available within their reach since the homemade guns are made by the villagers themselves at their homes and inexpensive, with costs for the making estimated between RM197 and RM1,184.85 (US$50–US$300). The weapon is used alongside other indigenous traditional hunting equipment of blowpipes and spear. Some indigenous villagers are experts in making the bakakuk, with some of their homemade manufactured versions being almost as good as factory-manufactured shotguns.

== Design ==
It is constructed from iron pipes, with nails, wooden pieces, bits of string, and tap heads. With length measured from 45 centimetres (1.48 ft) to 65 centimetres (2.13 ft), saw are traditionally used to made the main parts. The bullets can be either from shotgun pellet (12 bore bullet), marble, or small iron ball.

== Regulations ==
Since it is not legally registered, the bakakuk is considered an illegal firearm if unregistered or owned without a licence; local authorities often seize the weapon during enforcement operations. There have been various incidents regarding its usage, including by poachers, and the weapons are strictly regulated for indigenous farmers as well as plantation owners' usage for crop protection and vermin control under the firearm laws of Malaysia. Offences related to the abuse of bakakuk are usually punishable with the Arms Act 1960 and Firearms (Increased Penalties) Act 1971. In 2015 alone, around 200 homemade bakakuk were confiscated by authorities during a statewide operation.
