= History of Chechens in the Russian Empire =

Chechnya was first incorporated as a whole into the Russian Empire in 1859 after the decades-long Caucasian War. Tsarist rule was marked by a transition into modern times, including the formation (or re-formation) of a Chechen bourgeoisie, the emergence of social movements, reorientation of the Chechen economy towards oil, heavy ethnic discrimination at the expense of Chechens and others in favor of Russians and Kuban Cossacks, and a religious transition among the Chechens towards the Qadiri tariqa of Sufism.

== Deportation of Chechens to Turkey ==
In 1860, Russia commenced with forced emigration to ethnically cleanse the region. Tsar Alexander II forced the exile of millions of Caucasians (including at least 100,000 Chechens) in 1860–1866. Although Circassians were the main (and most notorious) victims (hence the "Circassian Genocide"), the expulsions also gravely affected other peoples in the region. It was estimated that 80% of the Ingush left Ingushetia for the Middle East in 1865. Lowland Chechens as well were evicted in large numbers, and while many came back, the former Chechen lowlands lacked their historical Chechen populations for a long period until Chechens were settled in the region during their return from their 1944–1957 deportation to Siberia. The Arshtins, at that time a (debatably) separate people, were completely wiped out as a distinct group: according to official documents, 1,366 Arshtin families disappeared (i.e. either fled or were killed), and only 75 families remained. These 75 families, realizing the impossibility of existing as a nation of only hundreds of people, joined (or rejoined) the Chechen nation as the Erstkhoi tukkhum.

As Dunlop points out, the 100,000 Chechens who were exiled in 1860–1864 may have comprised over half the nation at that time, as in the 1896 Russian census, there were only 226,171 Chechens listed.

=== Attempts to return ===
Some Chechens tried to return, but the Tsarist government refused to let them, even when they promised to convert to the Orthodox faith if they did. Nonetheless, some managed to return regardless.

== Social trends ==
=== Conversion to Qadiri Islam ===
In the mid-1800s, the Qadiri sect of Sufism gained large numbers of followers among the Chechens (largely at the expense of the Nakshbandi sect). Eventually, an overwhelming majority of Chechens were Qadiri, separating them from their eastern neighbors in Dagestan who continued to follow the Nakshbandi sect. The zikr, which later came to be seen as more of a "Chechen custom" than a "Muslim or Qadiri custom", is the circular dance accompanied with chanting or singing, and was largely specific to the Qadiri sect (although later it became more ethnic as non-Qadiris joined in). Finally, the Qadiri sect focused much more on individual salvation rather than the need to improve society (as the Nakshbandi did). For this reason, the Russian government initially viewed this mass transition with the hope that its allegedly less societal mindset would mean an end to Chechen resistance to their rule. However, in protest of unfavorable conditions, the Chechens rose up again in 1877–8, and the Qadiris played a major role in organizing the movement.

=== Land confiscation from the natives ===
In 1864, trying to dissuade further resistance, Tsar Alexander II issued a decree regarding the Caucasians' "religion, adat [Caucasian local law customs], lands and woods" stating that they would be preserved and protected "in perpetuity for the peoples of the North Caucasus". However, it did not take Alexander long to break this promise. The Russian government seized large swathes (hundreds of thousands of hectares) of the best farming land and the best wooded land, and gave them to Cossacks. Considerable land was also awarded to Russian soldiers who would later assimilate with the surrounding Cossacks, identifying themselves as Cossacks. These confiscations impoverished generations of Chechens and made large numbers of them land-hungry, sparking escalation of conflicts between Chechens and Cossacks. Chechen and Ingush clans in the area previously were forced to go without their traditional lands, and they maintained claims on the land throughout the whole period, jumping to reclaim the land as Russia receded in 1917.

=== Ethnic Discrimination ===
Ethnic discrimination occurred in many forms against Chechens during the Tsarist era of Chechen history, largely due to the colonialist viewpoint of the Russian government, viewing Chechens as inferior, savage and subversive, one of many peoples who Russia had a "moral duty to civilize".

==== Judicial ====
During the Tsarist period, Cossacks and Russians were tried for all crimes in civilian courts, usually being taken into custody by civil authorities. By contrast, Chechens and Ingush (as well as some other ethnic groups in the region) were dealt with exclusively by the military and tried in military courts, where they were typically given drastically harsher sentences, often death for crimes such as stealing food.

==== Land ownership ====
In addition to the initial land seizures, long term Russian policies favored the acquisition of more and more land by Russians at the expense of Chechens. In 1912, in their own homeland (and not including the lands north of the Terek that are often considered part of Chechnya and are currently within its jurisdiction), Chechens and Ingush owned well less than half as much land as Terek Cossacks did, per capita. Chechens had 5.8 desyatinas on average, Ingush had 3.0, and Terek Cossacks had 13.6.

=== Socioeconomic and Demographic changes ===
By the end of the 19th century, major oil deposits were discovered around Grozny (1893) which along with the arrival of the railroad (early 1890s), brought economic prosperity to the region (then administered as part of the Terek Oblast) for the oil-mining Russian colonists. The immigration of colonists from Russia brought about a three-way distinction between Chechens and Ingush on one hand, Cossacks on a second, and "other-towners" (inogorodtsy), namely Russians and Ukrainians, who came to work as laborers. A debatable fourth group, including Armenian bankers and richer Russians, and even some rich Chechens (such as Tchermoeff), arose later. Some Chechens got rich off oil, and the industry brought wealth to Chechnya, and (along with other factors) caused a growth of a Chechen bourgeoisie and intelligentsia.

=== Emergence of nationalism ===
During the late 1860s and 1870s, a modest Chechen national awakening in literary circles occurred. The conflict with Russia and its final incorporation into the empire, however, brought about the formation of a modern, European, nationalist identity of some Chechen writers, though it ironically solidified their separation, mainly over politics, from the Ingush. The nation was held to be all-important, trumping religion, political belief, or any other such distinction. In 1872, Umalat Laudaev, an early Chechen nationalist, recorded the contemporary customs of the Chechens.

Other notable early Chechen nationalists included Akhmetkhan, Ibraghim Sarakayev, and Ismail Mutushev. Later Tsarist-era Chechen nationalists include the five Sheripov brothers, among others. Among these, Sarakayev, Mutushev, Akhmetkhan and Danilbek Sheripov were notably democratic-minded writers, while Danilbek's younger brother, Aslanbek, would adopt communism.
