= Chechen wolf =

Wolf in Chechen culture

The Chechen wolf, or gray wolf (Chechen: Borz, pronounced [bo̞ɾz] or Caucasian pronunciation: [bwoɾz]), is the national animal of the Chechen nation.

== Culture ==
Characteristics of the wolf are also frequently compared to the Chechen people in a poetic or metaphoric sense, e.g. as being "free and equal like wolves", or representing "courage and tenacity", compared to the British "stiff upper lip" by Jaimoukha (2005). The saying of a person having been "raised by the She-Wolf" expresses admirable personality traits. Wolf clans are often equated to Chechen teips (clans).

== Mythological ==
There is one myth that the mythological founder of the Chechen nation, Turpalo-Noxchuo (Chechen Hero, from whom Chechens are descended "like sparks of steel"), was raised by a fabled, loving "Wolf Mother". Old Chechen lore holds that the sheep was actually originally created for the wolf to enjoy, but man "stole" the sheep from the wolf (this is rather interesting considering that many Chechens in the past have in fact been shepherds). According to the ethnographic historian Jaimoukha, in olden times Chechens used to observe a wolf cult that would prevent lupine raids on sheep, by observing Saturday as being a special day.

== In insignia and symbols ==
Chechen (Ichkerian) seal bearing a wolf, the nation's symbolic embodiment

The wolf is frequently used for insignia and images, as a symbol of the Chechen nation. Common poses involve the wolf howling off the top of a mountain (Chechnya is very mountainous), laying down, or staring at the viewer. The different poses evoke different symbolism:

- The wolf howling off the top of the mountain is usually an expression of national pride. In the period of 1991-1994, broadcasts in independent Chechnya bore this symbol, in that case symbolizing the struggle for national recognition. The symbol is also used by Chechens nowadays as a simple expression of being proud they are Chechen.
- The wolf lying down, facing the viewer is usually a reference to the mythological "Wolf Mother" of Turpalo-Noxchuo.
- Staring at the viewer usually evokes a feeling of intense emotion that the artist is implying they believe is felt by the Chechen nation.

Modernly, the coat of arms of the secular separatists in Chechnya bore the wolf. The Islamists later removed it and replaced it with Arabic script, and the Russian-sponsored ruling regime removed it entirely, but the secular government in exile still uses it. In addition, many other insignia of the Chechen nation (of all three governments) use the wolf as a heraldic symbol.

== In naming ==
- The gun manufactured by the Chechen separatists in the two Chechen wars was called the Borz, after the wolf.

== See also ==
- Vainakh mythology
