= Borz =

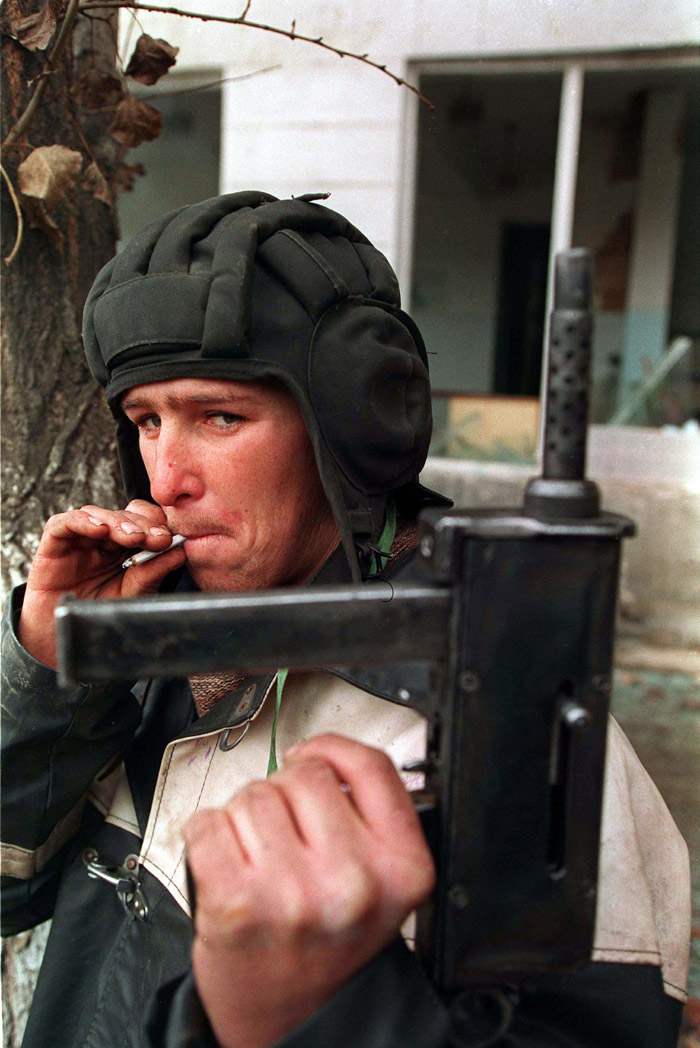
- A Chechen militiaman displaying his Borz, 1995.
- Type: Submachine gun
- Place of origin: Chechen Republic of Ichkeria

Service history
- Used by: Chechen Republic of Ichkeria; Mujahideen; Georgia
- Wars: Nagorno-Karabakh War; Georgian Civil War; First Chechen War; Second Chechen War; Russo-Georgian War; Russo-Ukrainian War

Production history
- Designed: Early 1991
- Unit cost: about $100

Specifications
- Mass: 2 kg (4.41 lb)
- Length: 740 mm (without stock)
- Cartridge: 9×18mm Makarov
- Caliber: 9 mm (9.2 mm)
- Barrels: 160
- Action: Blowback, open bolt
- Rate of fire: 1000 - 1200
- Muzzle velocity: 286-347 m/s
- Effective firing range: 50 m - 70 m
- Feed system: 20, 25 or 30-round detachable box magazine
- Sights: Varied from weapon to weapon, but usually non-existent.

The name Borz (Chechen: Борз, "wolf") is an umbrella term applied to all improvised submachine guns produced during the years of independence of the Chechen Republic of Ichkeria. It was produced in small numbers from 1992 to 1999. The initial model was based on the Armenian K6-92, which in turn was based on the PPS submachine gun.

== History ==
Production of the first model started in 1992 at the "Krasniy Molot" plant in Grozny. Only a few hundred Borzes were crafted at the "Krasniy Molot" plant, because production at this plant was stopped by the First Chechen War, and moved into underground workshops.

== Design and deployment ==
The Borz was initially a clone of the Armenian K6-92, which itself was loosely based on the Soviet PPS submachine gun. However, individual models can vary greatly, since the Borz is neither a single model of weapon, nor made by a particular weapon manufacturer, but a common name for all Chechen hand-made submachine guns with some similarity in design and appearance. Some of the Borz models from the late 1990s don't follow the original design and have an Uzi-like telescoping bolt and magazine in the pistol grip. These are often referred to as the "second generation Borz"—some of these also featured silencers and 40-round magazines.

The Borz was very simple and inexpensive to produce, costing about $100 in Chechnya. The receiver could be square steel tubing with a stamped steel dust-cover on top and trunnions in the front and rear, although some versions have a round receiver. The bolt design closely mimicked that of the Soviet PPS, and the magazine was based on the magazine used in the German MP 40. The trigger mechanism has features in common with the Madsen M-50, and enables both fully automatic and single fire. The ejector and barrel locking nut also resemble those of the Madsen. Its lightweight design and ease of use was ideal for sudden attacks, making up for its quality shortcomings. The barrel would generally wear out after firing about three magazines worth of ammunition, with the result of increasingly poor accuracy.

Like many improvised firearms (such as the FP-45 Liberator), the Borz submachine gun was intended for use by guerillas as a crude semi-disposable weapon to ambush police and military forces in urban settings, after which they could obtain higher-quality factory-produced arms from the dead and wounded.

== See also ==
- Insurgency weapons and tactics
