= Chechen tower architecture =

Feature of medieval architecture of Chechnya

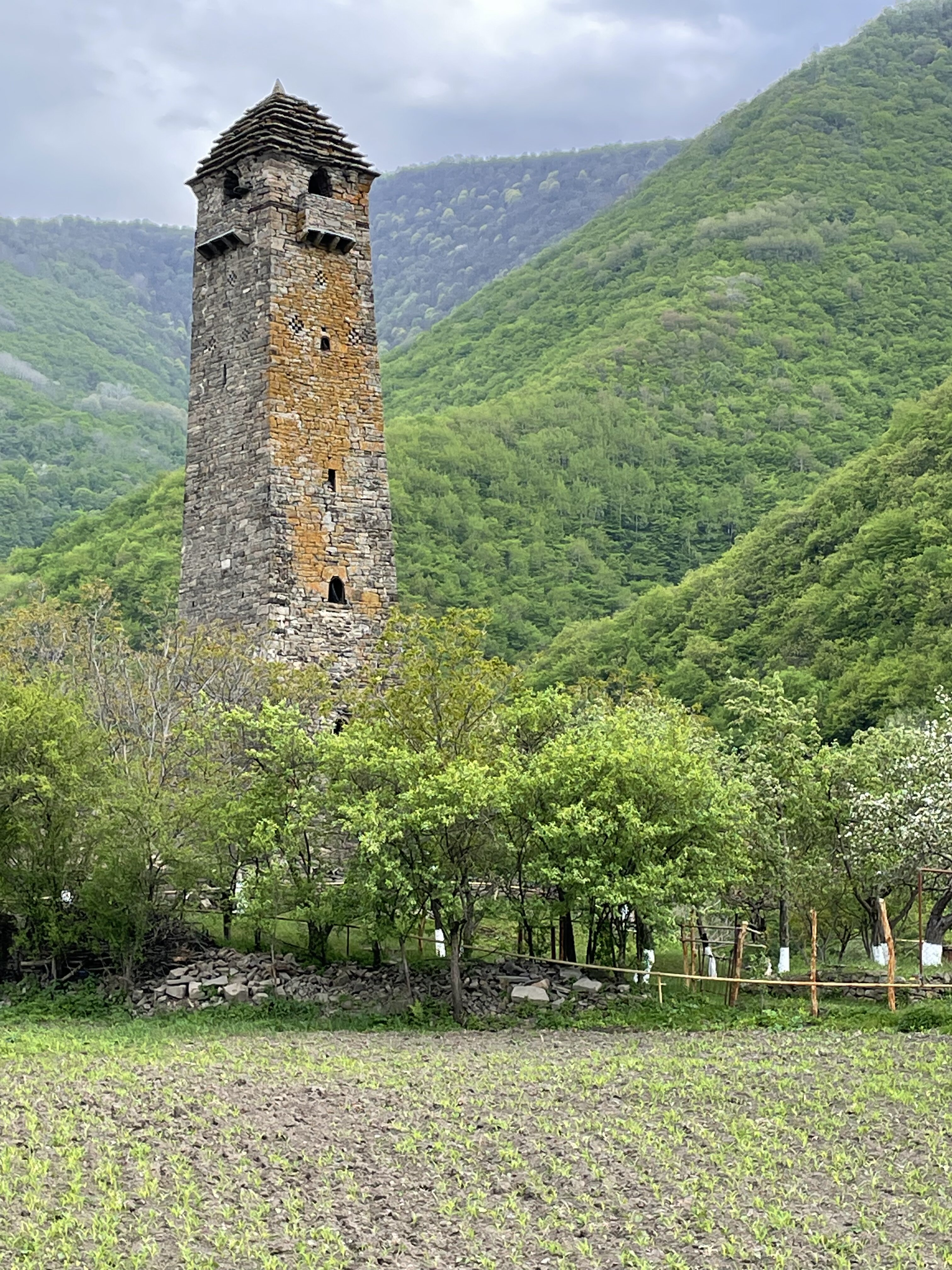
Combat tower Doere I., Tazbichi

Traditional Chechen architecture refers to the tradition of stone tower construction that developed in the mountainous regions of Chechnya during the Middle Ages, primarily between the 11th and 18th centuries. These towers formed the structural core of fortified settlements and played a central role in the defensive, residential, and symbolic organization of Chechen highland society.

Chechen towers were typically square in plan and built from locally quarried stone using dry or lime-mortar masonry. Their architecture is characterized by massive load-bearing walls, narrow defensive openings, vertically arranged internal floors, and, in combat towers, stepped pyramidal stone roofs supported by false vaults. Towers were commonly integrated into clustered village layouts, although isolated towers are also known, and were often combined with residential buildings, livestock enclosures, and communal spaces.

In addition to towers, the architectural landscape associated with this tradition included fortified settlements, stone dwellings, funerary structures such as above-ground and semi-subterranean crypts, as well as elements of economic infrastructure including terraced fields, mills, bridges, and water-management systems. These components formed a coherent built environment adapted to steep terrain, limited arable land, and the demands of territorial defense.

Archaeological and architectural research indicates that Chechen tower architecture did not develop as a single standardized type but evolved gradually, exhibiting regional and chronological variation in construction techniques, roof forms, internal layouts, and decorative elements. This variability reflects local building traditions, environmental conditions, and historical phases of development.

Today, Chechen tower architecture is regarded as a significant element of medieval Caucasian architecture and a distinctive example of highland fortification integrated into everyday communal life. Despite varying states of preservation, these structures remain an important subject of scholarly study for their architectural, historical, and cultural significance.

== Architectural significance ==
Chechen tower architecture developed as a distinct tradition within medieval Caucasian fortification: towers were the property of families and lineages, combat towers served the settlement collectively rather than any individual household, and the right to build a tower with a stepped pyramidal roof was reserved for the leading family of a settlement.

This stands in contrast to the feudal castles and donjons of Western Europe, which functioned as residential and administrative centres of individual lords; the Chechen tower complex cannot be equated with the seigneurial castle as it developed in Western Europe and the Near East.

Towers of comparable form appear among neighbouring peoples in Khevsureti, among the Ossetians, and in Dagestan and the broader Caucasus has been described as a zone of tower-building culture extending well beyond any single group. Within this context the Chechen examples are distinguished by walls tapering markedly toward the upper storeys and, in the later period, by stepped pyramidal stone roofs of up to sixteen courses.

Combat towers incorporated arrow slits at multiple levels, machicolations on the upper storey, and an entrance elevated above ground level, features that reduced vulnerability to assault while allowing fire from height.

== History ==
The earliest stone construction in the Chechen highlands predates the medieval tower tradition by millennia. Cyclopean walls built from roughly dressed or unworked stone blocks have been identified at Orsoy, Doshkhakle, Tsecha-Akhk, Nikaroy, and Bauloy, as well as in the Makazhoy basin; their dating is usually assigned to the Koban culture (late 2nd – early 1st millennium BCE), though some scholars suggest a broader range from the Bronze Age to the early Iron Age; it is also possible that a few of these structures could have survived and been used even longer. Stone cist burials and early above-ground crypts are attested across the Chechen highlands from the Bronze Age onward: cist cemeteries in Zandak (9th–8th centuries BCE), Kharachoy, and Gatyn-Kale (c. 1700–1400 BCE) document a continuous funerary building tradition that preceded the medieval tower complexes by more than two millennia.

The earliest vertical residential towers in the Chechen highlands, rectangular in plan, two to three storeys, built in cyclopean or rough masonry, are dated by Piotrovsky (1988) to the 10th–12th centuries. The site of Tsecha-Akhk became central to a scholarly dispute over this chronology. Umarov dated the cyclopean structures there to the 10th–12th centuries, interpreting them as transitional forms between horizontal multi-chamber dwellings and the later vertical tower: three-storey, oblong in plan (the largest measuring 22 × 12 m), divided by a transverse wall, and built with lime mortar but with walls that do not taper upward. Ilyasov (2024) rejected this dating, arguing that by the 10th–12th centuries Chechen residential and combat towers had already undergone considerable evolution toward classical forms, making the interval proposed by Umarov insufficient for the transformation from shapeless cyclopean structures to finished towers; he assigned the earliest cyclopean constructions at Tsecha-Akhk to the 1st millennium BCE, with the broader cyclopean tradition in Chechnya spanning from the late 2nd to the late 1st millennium BCE.

Pagan sanctuaries, attested in Maysta and Melkhista, took two forms: a monument resembling a house facade, and an enclosed structure for storing cult objects; both employed the same stepped pyramidal stone roofing used in towers and crypts, indicating a unified architectural tradition across functional building types. Christianity, introduced through Georgian influence in the highlands and Byzantine activity in the lowlands, left epigraphic traces on architectural structures but did not displace the established building forms. Following the Mongol invasion, cultural contacts with Georgia and Byzantium ceased; highland communities returned to pre-Christian practice, and the syncretism of religious and funerary architecture continued without interruption.

Periodisation of Chechen stone construction
Period	Character of activity	Principal sources
Prehistory - early medieval	Cyclopean enclosures, stone cists, early crypts; foundations of the highland building tradition	
10th-12th centuries	First residential towers (ghala); spread of stone crypts	
13th-14th centuries	Mass tower construction accelerates following Mongol and Timurid devastation of lowland settlements; Christian churches under Georgian influence. Start of Combat Towers Construction.	
15th-16th c. - peak	Classical combat towers with stepped pyramidal roofs, machicolations, ribbed vaults; specialist builder lineages	
17th - early 18th century	Continued construction but declining pace; mosques converted from towers; Islam reshapes funerary architecture	
Late 18th - 19th century	Tower construction ceases; Caucasian War destroys hundreds of complexes; highland depopulation	-
20th - 21st century	Deportation of 1944 and armed conflicts of 1994–2000 cause further deliberate destruction	-

Mass construction of residential and combat towers accelerated from the 13th century onward. The Mongol campaigns of the 13th century and Timur's campaigns of the late 14th century destroyed lowland and foothill settlements, driving population into the high mountains; Muzhukhoev (1984) attributed the dense tower-building of the late medieval period directly to the population pressure created by these displacements. At Kharachoy, a cultural layer with animal bones and pottery dated to the 13th–14th centuries was found beneath a promontory that could have accommodated no more than three or four structures, indicating fortified occupation of this period even where little survives above ground. Ilyasov (2009) connected the burst of tower construction in the 12th–13th centuries to the formation of the Tower Signal System, a coordinated network of observation and warning towers across the highland zone. Timur's campaigns, in Ilyasov's assessment, not only destroyed the remnants of Chechen political organisation but fundamentally disrupted the foundations of the highland civilisation, producing a cartographic reshaping of the entire North Caucasus.

Underground and semi-underground crypts became widespread across the Chechen highlands in the 13th–15th centuries, a development Muzukhoev linked to the same demographic concentration in the mountain zone. In areas poor in stone, such as the Shatoy basin and Bamut, or where natural caves were abundant, as in the Makazhoy basin and around Lake Galanchozh, communities adapted existing terrain for burial rather than constructing new masonry structures.

=== Evolution of the combat tower ===
Studies of combat towers with pyramidal stepped roofs in Chechnya and Ingushetia show that this type was not initially stylistically or structurally unified. During its formative phase, a lack of architectural consistency is evident, indicating an early stage in the development of this class of fortifications.

Within the region, two main variants can be distinguished: a more archaic form, prevalent mainly in the eastern areas, and a “classical” type characteristic primarily of Ingushetia. Early towers feature relatively low pyramidal stepped roofs (4–11 steps) and either the absence or structural incompleteness of inter-floor constructions. The later variant is marked by an increased number of roof steps (up to 13–16), the development of internal stone vaulting with ribs, and an overall refinement of construction techniques.

A comparable evolutionary pattern is observed in the region’s funerary architecture: Chechen crypts display fewer roof steps, whereas Ingush examples show an increased number, accompanied by later burial assemblages. This supports the interpretation of pyramidal stepped roofing as the result of a prolonged process of structural and stylistic development.

Most scholars date the formation of combat towers of this type to no earlier than the 16th–17th centuries, linking their development to a broader Caucasian architectural context and emphasizing the significant role of Chechen builders in shaping the classical form.

== Residential towers ==
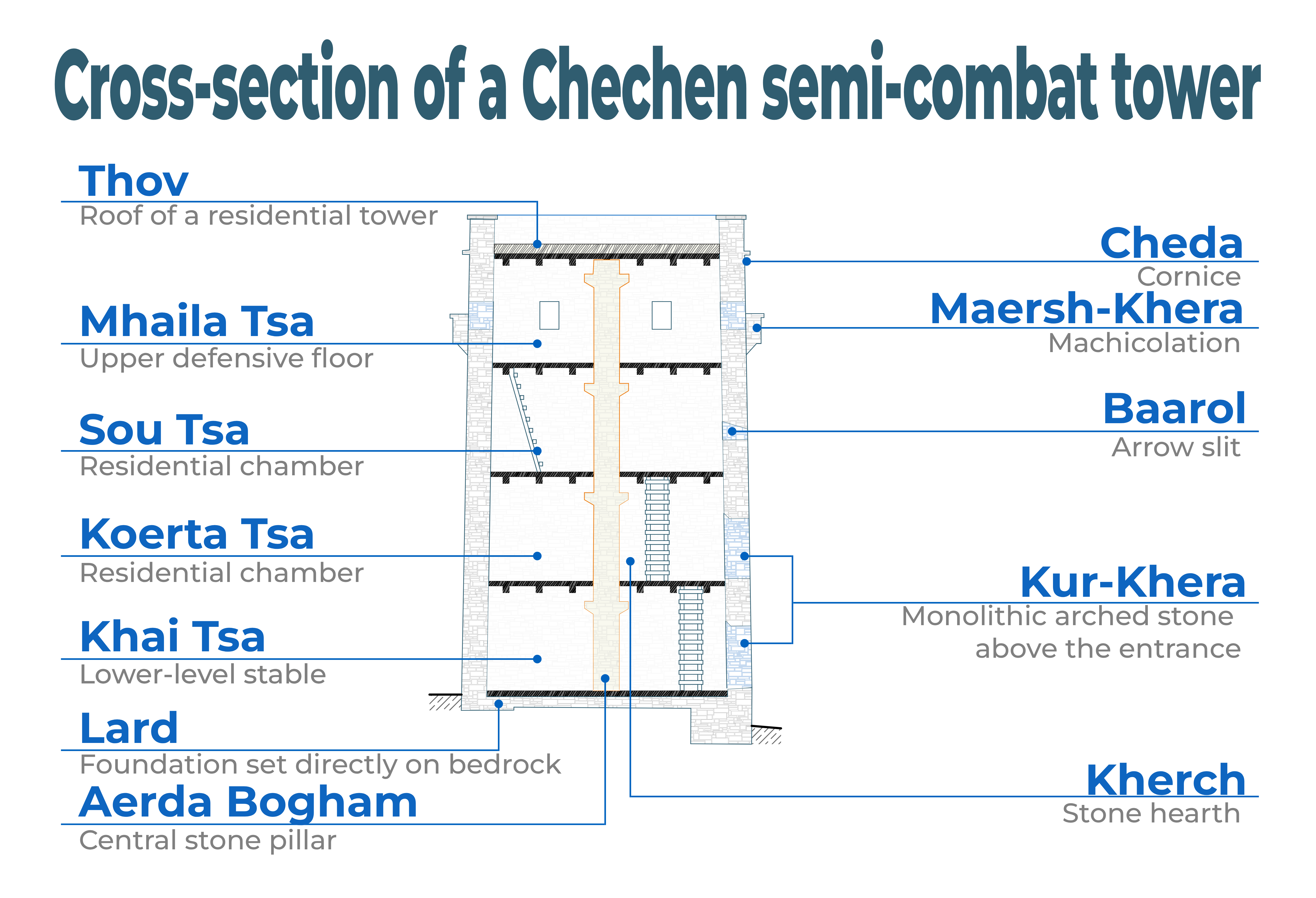
Chechen semi-combat tower

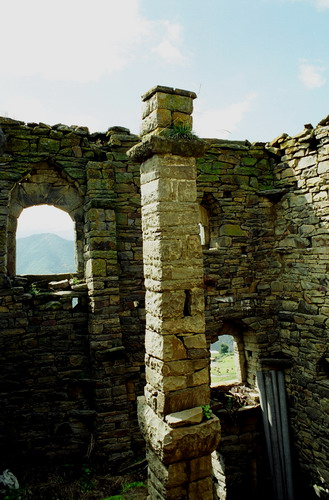
Central pillar (Aerd-Bogham) of residential tower in Haskali

Residential towers (Ghala), which developed in Chechnya between the 12th and 18th centuries, were monumental stone structures with a rectangular or slightly trapezoidal ground plan. Their height usually reached three or four storeys, with each level serving a clearly defined functional purpose, the ground floor was a stable for horses and cows, the next floor up was for goats and sheep, and the remaining upper levels were for human habitation.

Externally, these towers appeared austere yet proportionate, owing to their upward-tapering walls, carefully dressed stone blocks, and regular masonry. The ground plan was close to square, typically measuring approximately 7–9 × 10–12 meters, while the usable floor area of a single storey ranged from about 35 to 70 square meters. The height of the storeys was as follows: the lower ones about 2 m, the upper ones 2.5–3.5 m.

The foundations were laid either directly on rock outcrops or on compacted clay. When building on clayey soils, the upper layer of earth was removed and treated with a special liquid mixture until it ceased to absorb moisture. Large stone blocks were invariably used in the foundations and lower courses, significantly increasing structural stability. Unlike combat towers, where dry masonry was common, residential towers were typically built using lime mortar, which provided additional strength. The roof was flat, usually constructed from brushwood and clay, and surrounded by a projecting stone parapet. This parapet functioned both as a viewing platform and, when necessary, as an element of defense.

The internal layout followed a strict functional hierarchy. The ground floor was reserved for economic purposes, including housing livestock and storing fodder and grain; pits were often dug into the floor for storage. Living quarters were located on the upper floors—usually the second and, in taller towers, the third. The main living space was situated above the byre and centered on an open hearth built directly into the floor. A cauldron was suspended above the fire on a chain, which held sacred significance and was passed down through generations. Smoke was vented through openings in the walls.

Household items were stored in wall niches and on raised ledges resembling low stepped platforms along the walls. Furnishings typically included a carved wooden bed and a chair for the head of the household, a bench–divan for guests, three-legged stools, a low round table, and a carved wooden chest for storing grain and flour.

Each floor was supported by wooden beams resting on a massive central stone pillar, which fulfilled both structural and symbolic functions. This central column (Aerd-Bogham) was regarded as a symbol of the stability of the household and the dwelling itself. The column was reinforced at each level by horizontal projecting stone slabs, which supported a longitudinal beam running through the centre of the building. In addition to the central pillar, the beam ends were supported by wall pilons or pilasters. The beams rested with one end on the central girder and were embedded with the other end into the outer masonry.

The uppermost story often served combat purposes. Its walls were equipped with arrow slits, as well as openings fitted with machicolations—balcony-like projections without floors, enclosed on the sides and above. These features were usually placed above entrances and were used for vertical defence, allowing stones to be dropped onto attackers. The flat earthen roof, enclosed by a parapet, could also be used defensively; in some cases, a vessel of boiling water was reportedly kept there during sieges.

Internal staircases were initially wooden and were later replaced with stone constructions. Movement between floors was typically achieved through trapdoor openings positioned in the corners of the ceilings. In many towers the entrance to the second floor was located at a height of 3–4 m; it was generally narrow and low and placed on a side less convenient for attack, with a small wooden balcony in front of it or, alternatively, a projecting corbel beam built into the masonry, against which a wooden ladder was placed. In some cases, a concealed exit leading towards the slope was provided as an emergency escape route during a siege.

Architectural details played an important role in both construction and symbolism. Solid stone arches were invariably installed above door and window openings, often decorated with carved ornament. These arches served not only a structural function but also formed part of a symbolic architectural language transmitted across generations. Stone hearths (Kherch) functioned as the centre of family life; in later periods, they were replaced by flued fireplaces. Furniture was frequently built into the walls in the form of niches, cupboards, and chests, and was decorated with characteristic motifs, including swastikas, rosettes, crosses, and rhombuses, symbolising cycles, fertility, and protection.

Many residential towers remained inhabited until the early 20th century, particularly in mountainous areas such as Maysta and Galanchozh, where such structures survived into the Soviet period.

== Military towers ==
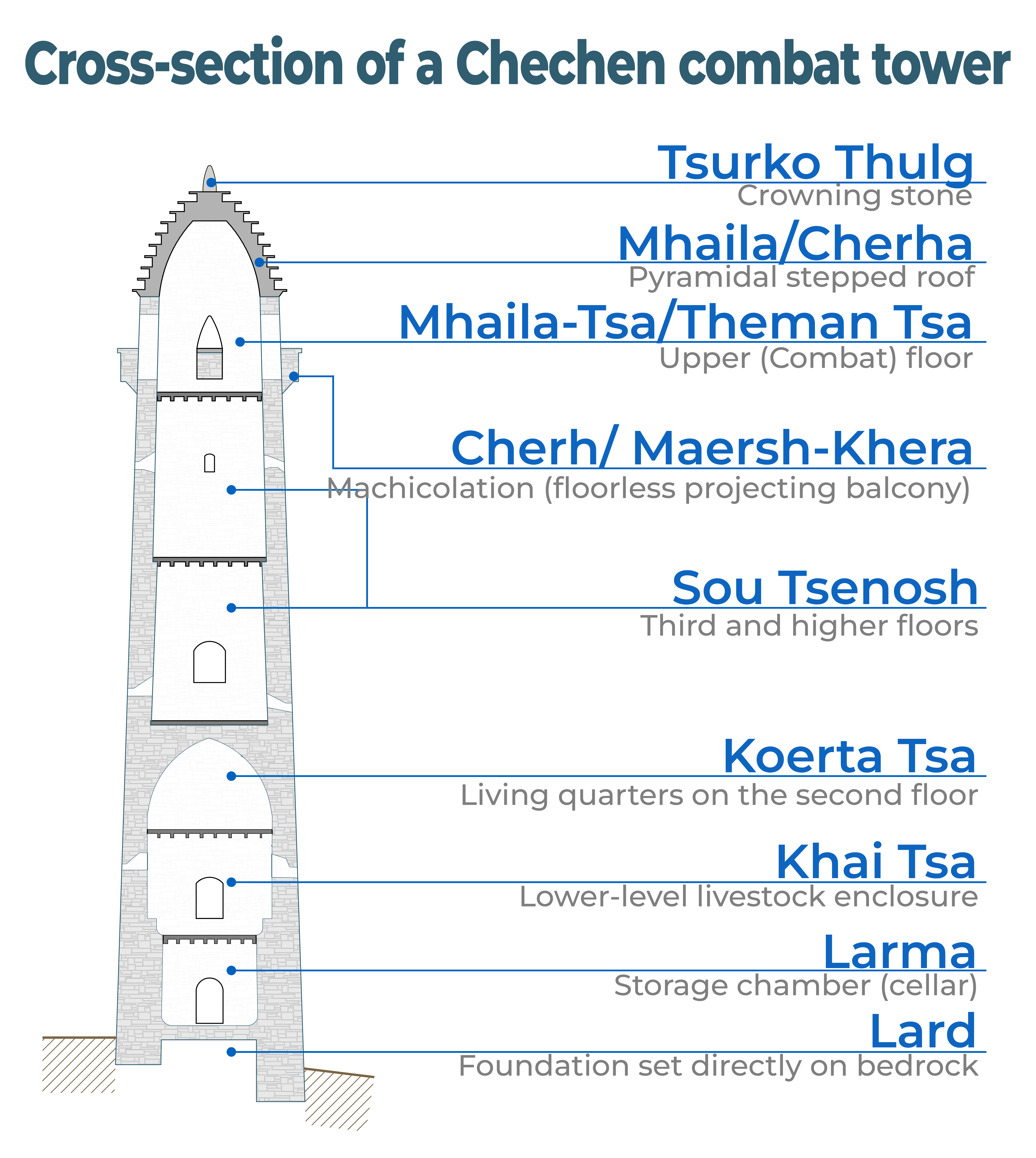
Chechen combat tower

Combat towers (Bjov) were a key element of medieval architecture in Chechnya. Their primary function was defence: observation, warning and signalling, and the ability to engage attackers from elevated positions. Towers were typically built at strategically advantageous sites—on ridges, slopes, near passes, and on the approaches to settlements—and could stand alone as watchtowers or form part of fortified residential compounds and castle-like complexes.

Combat towers were generally taller but narrower than residential ones: 20–25 meters high or more, with four of five floors and a square base 5–6 meters wide and tapers upwards (approximately 4–6°). They were built of dressed stone with lime or lime-sand mortar. Wall thickness is greatest at the base (around 1 m) and decreases on the upper levels (to roughly 0.6 m). This geometry improves stability under wind load and reduces vulnerability to assault.

The ground floor ceiling of the later, 15th–17th century towers was a false vault, known as nartol tkhov, with two intercrossing rows of reinforcing ribs.

Special attention was paid to the dressing and finishing of the keystones at the top of doors and windows, called kurtulg ("proud stone"). They bore the name of the owner, and were frequently decorated with petroglyphs.

The classical combat tower was not intended to withstand long sieges. Tower defenders had only a small stock of food and extremely limited arsenals, be it arrows, stone missiles or powder and shot in later times. Due to their small size, a watchtower or a beacon could house four to six on outsentry duty. All combat tower stories were equipped for observation and fighting.

Roof types

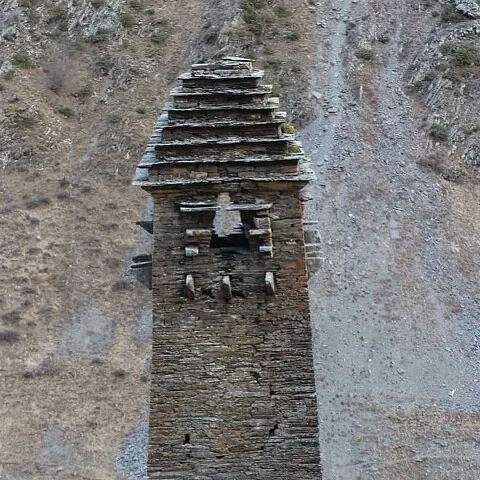
Pyramidal stepped roof and remnants of machicolations of the Khulandoi Tower

Scholarly descriptions usually distinguish three principal roof configurations:

- Flat roof — generally treated as an earlier form, often associated with the 11th–14th centuries. These towers were usually lower (three to four storeys), often had an entrance at ground level, and lacked developed stone vaulting; they could serve as signal or observation towers.
- Corner battlements — towers of the 14th–16th centuries with a more developed roof platform protected by corner merlons, allowing defenders to fire while remaining partially covered. Such towers could be incorporated into fortified complexes (for example, at Tsoi-Pede).
- Pyramidal stepped roof — a later and more complex form, with a roof composed of stepped stone courses (reported in the literature as ranging from 4 to 16 steps). The roof was built by corbelling (a “false vault”) and finished with a pointed terminal stone (Tsurko). Towers of this type commonly combined a vaulted lower storey with timber floors above and machicolations on the upper level.

Defensive features

Combat towers incorporated a set of architectural features intended for protection and active defense, including:

- Machicolations (cherh) on the upper storey, typically carried on several stone brackets.
- Arrow slits and narrow openings distributed across multiple levels.
- A vaulted lower storey, which reduced the risk of the structure being set on fire from below.
- An elevated entrance, often on the second storey, accessed by a removable ladder.
- Subterranean passages or tunnels, reported in a limited number of cases, which may have served as concealed escape routes or provided access to nearby terrain during a siege.

Signal towers

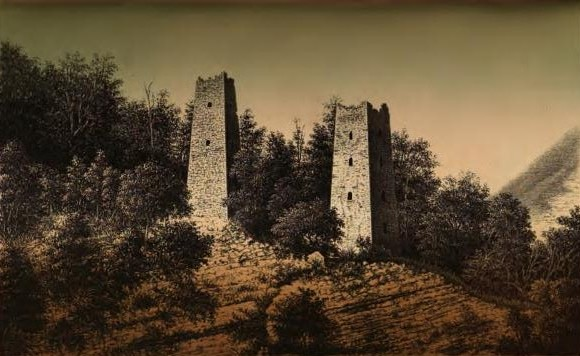
Twin signal towers in Hakkoi, Shatoi

Flat-roofed towers in Chechnya generally functioned as signal towers. They were erected in hard-to-access locations—on high cliffs, rocky outcrops, and steep slopes—where the construction of a full-scale combat tower was impractical due to difficulties in transporting materials and the absence of any strategic need for large-scale defense.

Examples of signal towers include structures at Kheldy, Guchan-Kale, and Sakhana. Their architecture is characterised by austere simplicity and laconic forms. This reflects not a low level of technical development or limited patron resources, but rather the specific functional purpose of these structures and the extreme conditions under which they were built.

Their placement further indicates a signaling role: such towers are often situated far from roads and settlements, making them unsuitable for habitation or refuge, but well suited for observation and the transmission of signals.

In many cases, especially where signal towers were remote from settlements, auxiliary structures were erected nearby—guard rooms intended for the permanent residence of observers. Such complexes have been documented, for example, at the tower near the village of Kheldi.

== Architectural characteristics ==
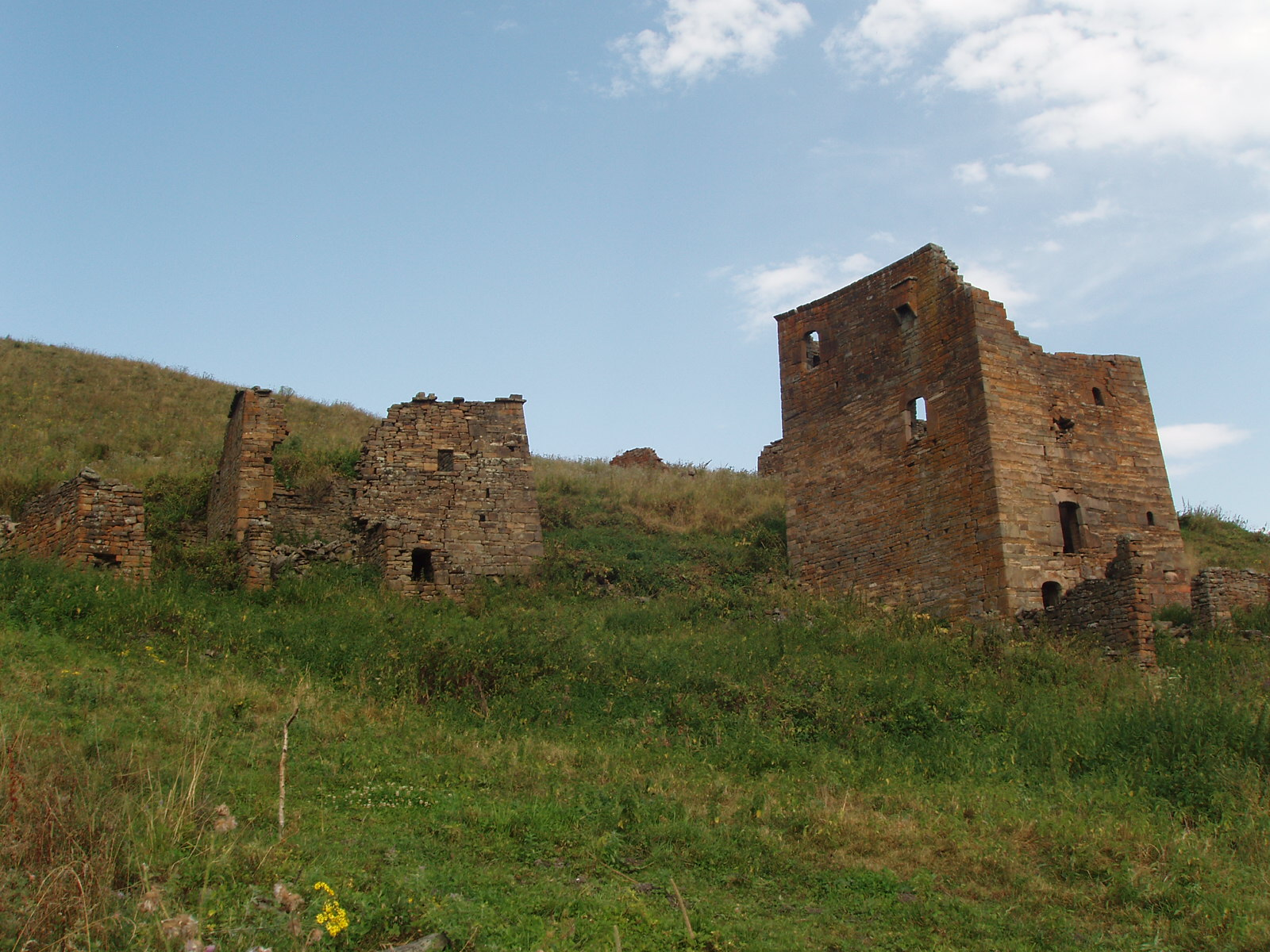
Ruins of the settlement of Bitsi

=== Materials and construction techniques ===
The construction of traditional Chechen towers—particularly combat towers (Bjov) and other stone structures—drew on knowledge of locally available stone and established building techniques. This expertise was transmitted from master to apprentice, most often within family lineages, and the resulting construction techniques demonstrate a high level of engineering skill for their time.

Foundations and base

Combat towers were erected without foundations in the modern sense. Instead, their bases were laid directly onto exposed bedrock, most commonly marl or sandstone platforms. Massive stones, sometimes exceeding human height, were placed at the base of the structure. The corner sections were reinforced with particularly large blocks, including shaped river boulders, which provided additional structural stability.

Stone masonry

Wall masonry was typically composed of:

- marl,
- sandstone,
- locally sourced boulders,
- and, in some cases, slate slabs.

Stones were usually roughly dressed and laid with careful bonding: larger and smaller stones alternated within the courses, enhancing the strength of the walls. Particularly refined masonry is characteristic of the late medieval period, when stones were fitted with a high degree of precision. The use of true dry masonry in the construction of residential towers in mountainous Chechnya has not been confirmed by archaeological or written sources.

Mortars employed in construction included:

- clay mixed with marl fragments,
- clay-lime compositions,
- organic additives such as straw, which improved elasticity and moisture retention.

In certain cases, the mortar was predominantly lime-based, identifiable by its whitish color and cohesive structure.

Towers were oriented either:

- with their longitudinal axis aligned to the cardinal directions, or
- with their corners facing the cardinal points,

a practice that may reflect established architectural conventions or elements of symbolic orientation.

Floors and structural solutions Interfloor constructions rested either:

- on stone corbels integrated into the masonry, primarily on lower levels, or
- on wooden beams inserted into pre-cut wall sockets on upper tiers.

In some cases, corbels were absent entirely, and all beams relied solely on wall sockets for support.

Technical devices The lifting of heavy stone blocks—especially during the construction of the stepped pyramidal roofs of defensive towers—was carried out using mechanical lifting devices known as windlasses (Chagarg), which formed part of the local building tradition. These devices allowed for the controlled elevation and precise placement of massive stone elements at great heights.

Such construction methods, including techniques of stone fitting, bonding, and load distribution, were closely guarded professional knowledge transmitted within hereditary builder families.

=== Decorative elements and symbolism ===
Carved signs and petroglyph-like motifs are reported on some combat towers. These include spirals, handprints, swastika-like solar signs, crosses, and other geometric or anthropomorphic figures. For a long time, such petroglyphs were assumed to have originated during the period of intensive tower and crypt construction, that is, between the 11th and 16th centuries. More recent research, however, indicates that many of these symbols are significantly earlier and show close parallels to signs found on ceramic and metal objects of the Koban culture, dating to the early 1st millennium BCE.

Such carvings are often interpreted in the literature as having protective or symbolic functions alongside the towers’ practical combat role. Particularly noted examples include a tower at Sharoy decorated with paired spirals and a tower at Tsoi-Pede featuring a cross motif and anthropomorphic figures.

These mixed-function towers are rare in the Chechen highland, probably because tower complexes and castles had become widespread by the time this concept appeared. Whereas a tower had space for only a few cows and horses, a castle could give shelter to the entire livestock in wartime.

Petroglyphs were especially frequent on southern walls, a pattern likely linked both to the symbolic significance of the south in early belief systems and to practical considerations of illumination, as sunlight enhanced the visibility and perceived potency of the carvings.

Thus, petroglyphs constituted an integral component of Chechen architectural expression and spiritual protection, reflecting cosmological and religious concepts that persisted for centuries.

== Crypts ==
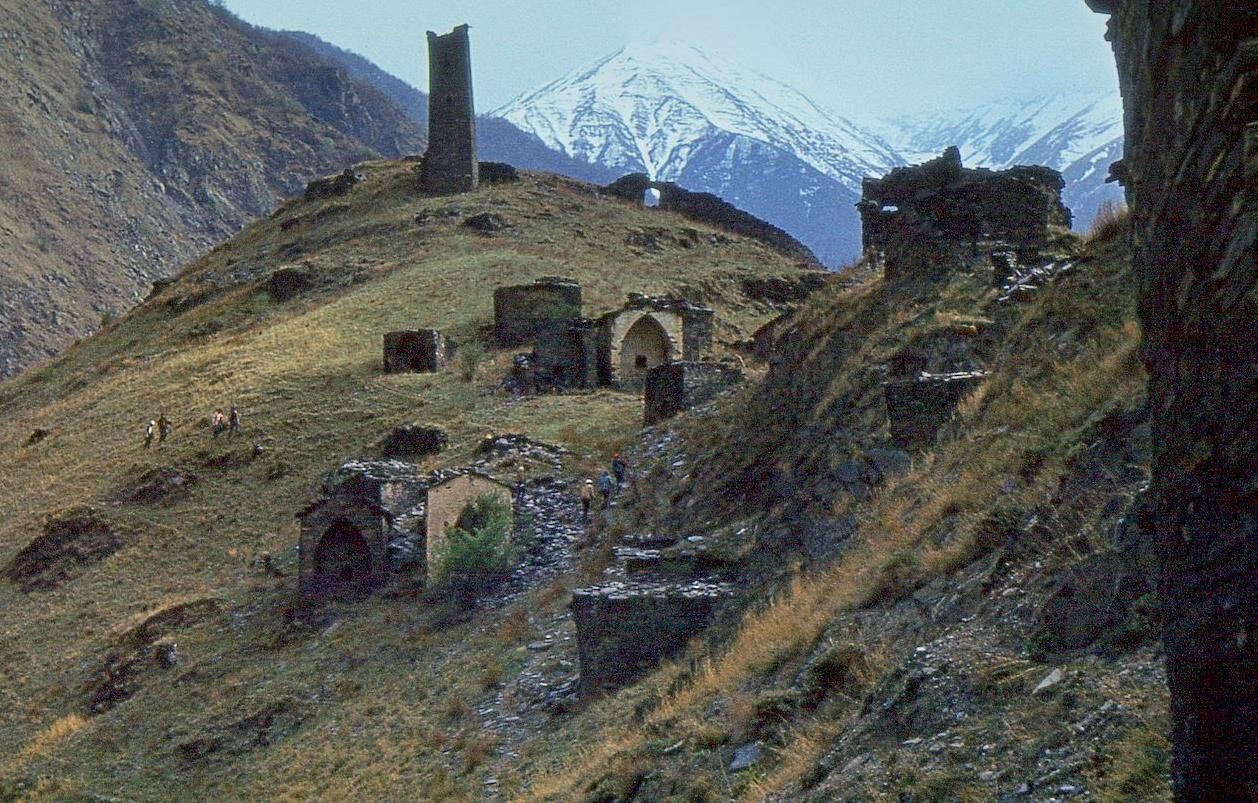
Medieval above-ground stone crypts of the Tsoi-Pede necropolis

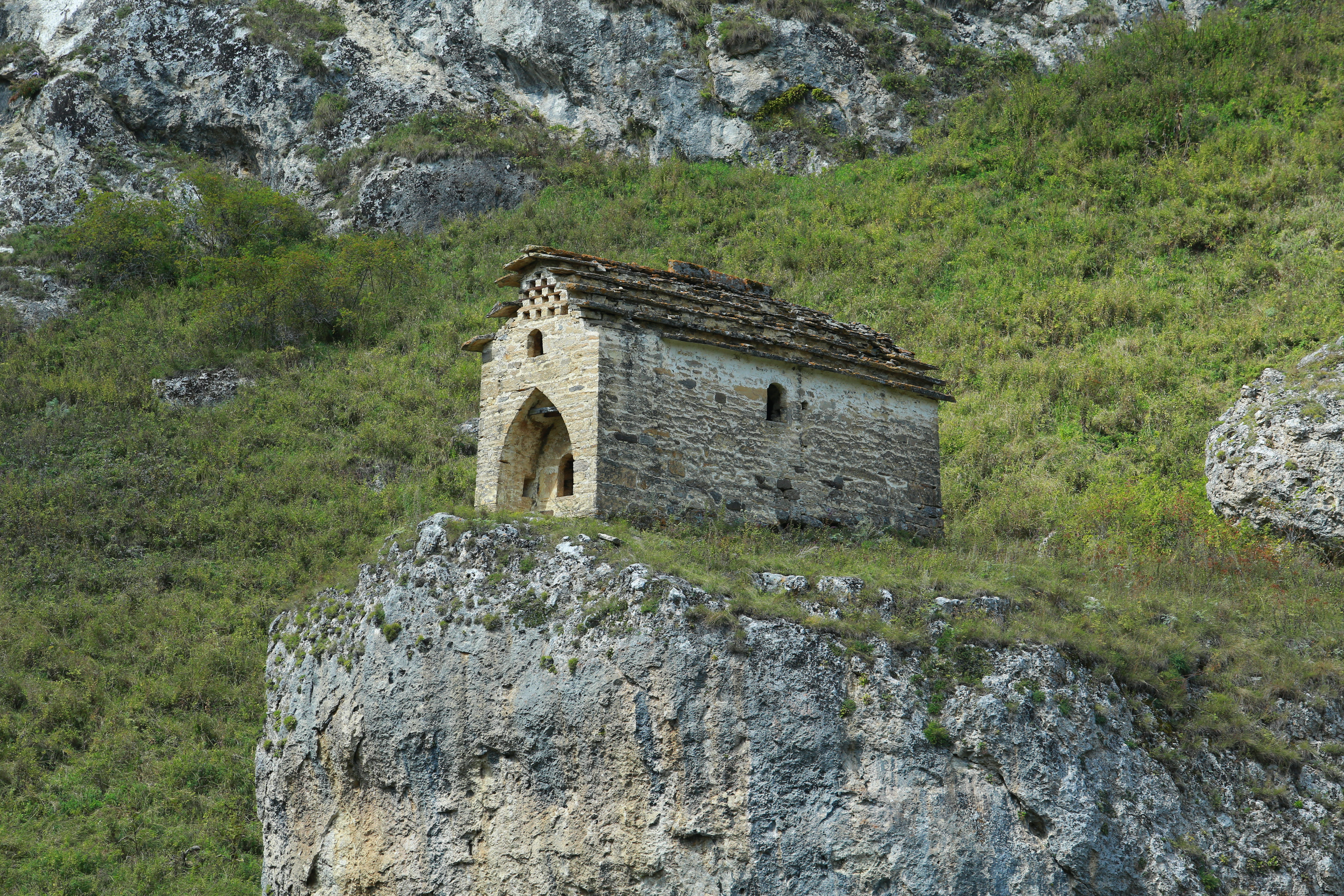
The Tomb ‘House of the Beauty’ in Akka — a typical tomb with gabled roofs.

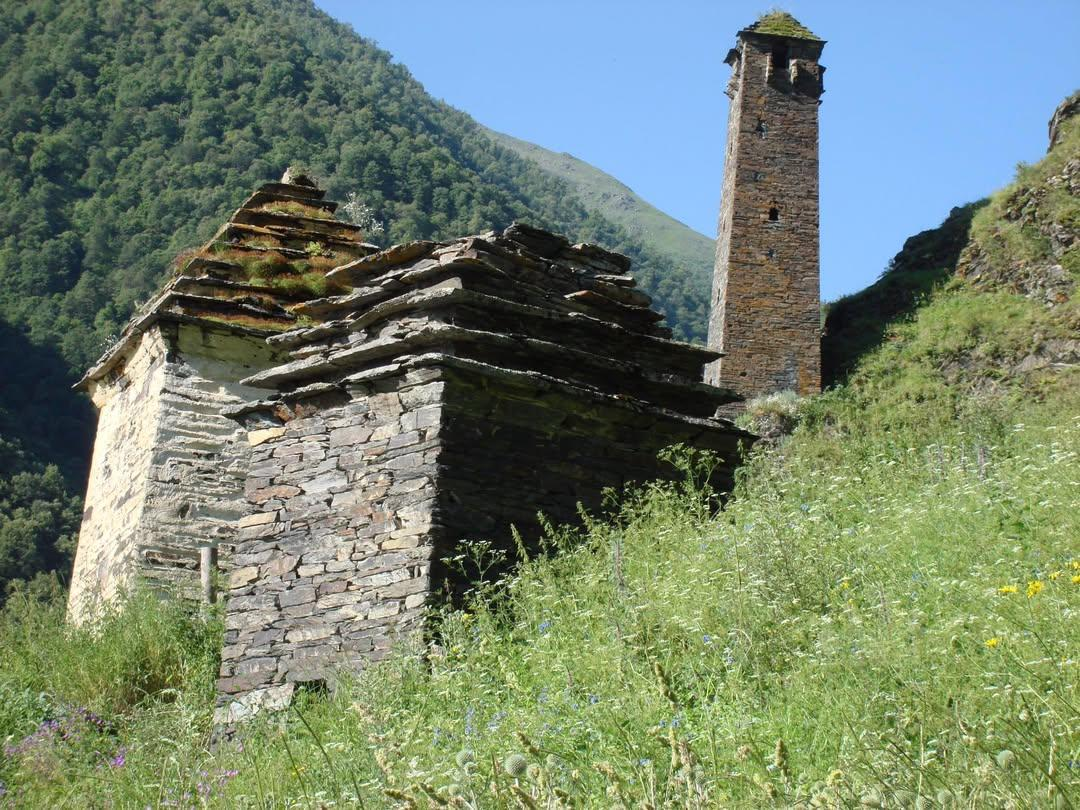
Crypts and a combat tower in Meshi

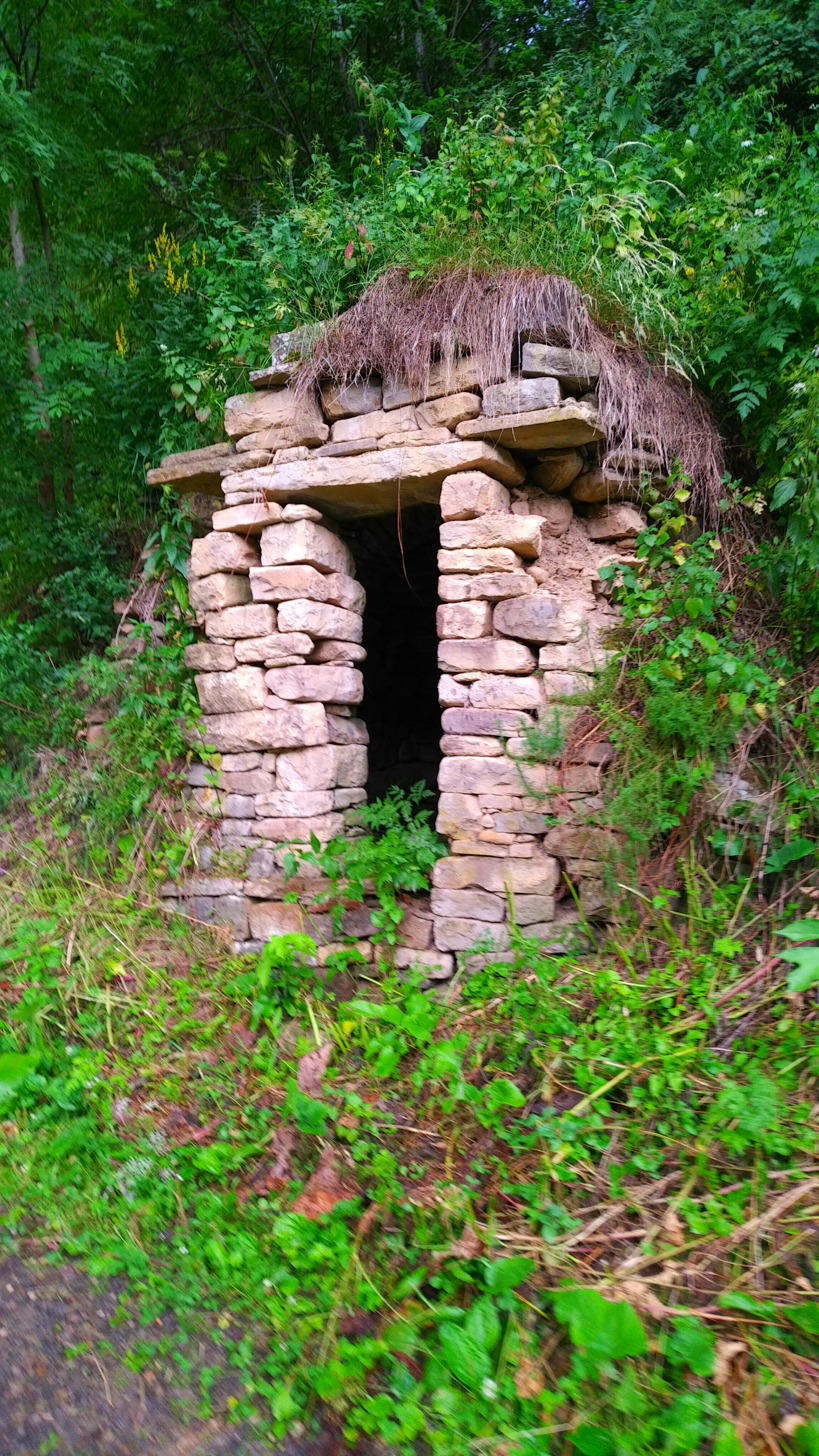
Underground crypt in Bugaroi

Chechens have used crypts as family burial vaults from the Middle Ages until the mid-19th century. These structures are conventionally divided into three main types: underground, semi-underground, and above-ground. Their architectural forms range from simple rectangular chambers to multi-tiered, tower-like constructions with corbelled vaults and stepped roofs. Burials were arranged using lime mortar and plaster.

Crypts were closely associated with ancestor veneration and ancient solar symbolism. According to traditional beliefs, the Sun illuminated the world of the living, while the Moon illuminated the realm of the dead. The term malkh-kash (“sun grave”) reflects this cosmological concept. Necropolises were typically located near settlements, emphasising the perceived continuity between the living and the dead. Construction and use of crypts gradually declined with the spread of Islam.

In 2024 Tsoi Pede was added to the preliminary list of candidate sites for the List of UNESCO World Heritage Sites.

Typology

Architecturally, crypts fall into three principal categories: underground, semi-underground, and above-ground.

Underground crypts consist of rectangular or oval chambers fully sunk into the ground, with stone walls and slab roofs. Stone shelves arranged in tiers along the walls held the bodies. After burial, entrances were filled with earth, rendering the structures almost invisible. Archaeological evidence dates some examples to as early as the 9th century.

Semi-underground crypts had part of their structure—typically the entrance, sections of the walls, and the roof—projecting above the slope. Internally, they retained stone shelves and usually featured corbelled (“false”) vaults formed by inward-sloping masonry.

Above-ground crypts were built entirely above the surface and display considerable variation, including:

- rectangular plans with stepped gabled roofs;
- façades with projecting vestibules serving as commemorative chambers;
- smooth gabled roofs with a slightly convex profile;
- multi-tiered, tower-like crypts with stepped pyramidal roofs or flat roofs with corner spires.

Most above-ground and semi-underground crypts consisted of a single chamber, though two-chamber examples are known. In tower-like crypts, individual burial chambers could have separate entrances. Lime mortar and yellow plaster were used both externally and internally, and ceilings were typically constructed using corbelling techniques.

Above-ground crypts

From the 14th century onward, above-ground clan burial vaults—malkh-kash (Chechen kash, “sun”; kash, “house”)—became widespread in mountainous Chechnya, forming extensive necropolises often referred to as “cities of the dead.”

Archaeological and ethnographic sources describe malkh-kash as rectangular stone buildings approximately 4–5 m long and at least 3 m high. Roofs were usually gabled and made of stone slabs. A narrow quadrangular entrance was typically placed on the northern or eastern side. Inside, horizontal shelves arranged in one to three tiers held the deceased. The dry interior conditions often led to natural mummification.

Some crypts feature pointed entrance arches and ritual niches, while more complex examples include two or three burial chambers, each with a separate entrance. Elaborate roofing systems with carefully fitted stone slabs are also documented.

Notable necropolises are located in the upper reaches of the Argun River, particularly in Maelkhista and Maysta. The necropolis at Tsoi-Pede consists mainly of crypts with ritual niches, whereas Maysta is characterised by two-storey structures employing similar architectural principles.

According to Sh. B. Akhmadov, malkh-kash belonged to specific families, clans, or teips, reflecting a high degree of clan organisation and social differentiation in the late medieval period. Their close spatial and symbolic association with residential and combat towers underscores the integration of ritual and everyday architecture.

Coin finds from crypts near Upper Kokadoy indicate continued use during the second half of the 14th century. These include silver dirhams of the Golden Horde dated to 1360–1387, as well as a Russian coin attributed to the reign of Dmitry Donskoy or Vasily Dmitrievich.

Underground crypts Underground crypts, used in highland Chechnya from the 9th to the 14th centuries, consist of rectangular or oval chambers fully buried in the ground. Walls were built of flagstone or split slate bonded with clay mortar and often taper upwards through corbelling. Roofs were formed from massive stone slabs. Niches, shelves, and bases for vessels are commonly found inside. Entrances were usually rectangular openings in one of the walls, more rarely from above.

The number of burials in a single crypt ranges from one to ten, with interments sometimes added over several generations. Both extended and flexed burial positions are attested. Burial inventories include weapons, jewellery, tools, ceramics, and coins dating from the 9th to the 14th centuries, as well as inscriptions and vessels bearing Georgian script. Many assemblages display elements associated with the Koban cultural tradition.

== Settlement layout ==
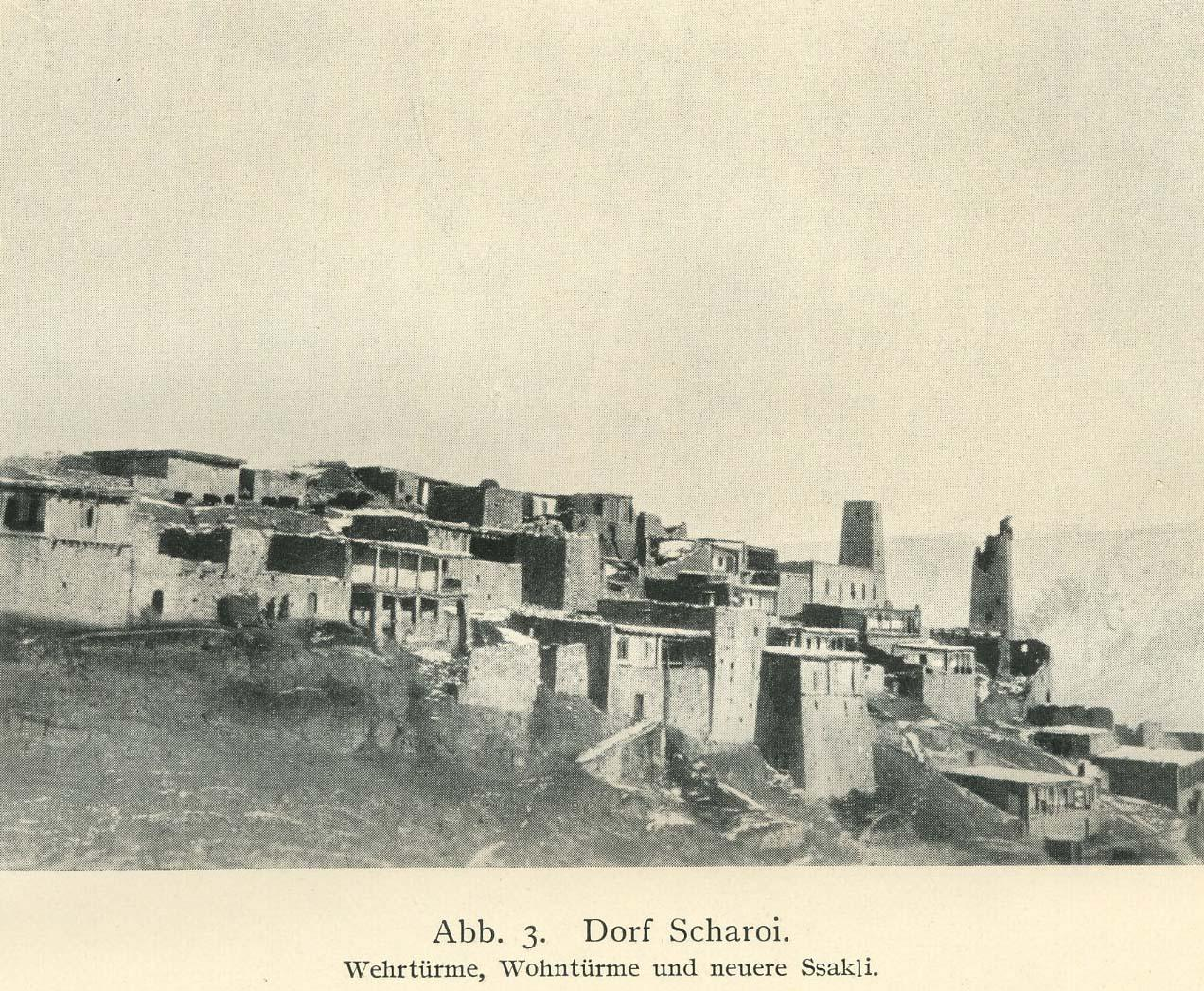
Sharoi in 19th century

The layout of traditional Chechen mountain settlements developed under the combined influence of natural conditions, military requirements, and the social organization of the population. Settlements were established with careful consideration of terrain, access to water sources, and the need for collective defense.

Chechen towns were located primarily on mountain slopes, terraces, and in the upper reaches of gorges. Building patterns followed the shape of the terrain, resulting in a terraced settlement structure in which residential and economic buildings were arranged in stepped levels, mirroring the line of the slope.

The street network lacked a regular plan. Internal routes consisted of narrow winding passages, stair descents, and connecting walkways determined by elevation differences and dense construction. Burial grounds and cult-related structures were generally located outside the dense residential core or along its periphery.

Mountain settlements in Chechnya were characterised by a high density of development. Houses were built in close proximity to one another, forming compact clusters of structures. The outer boundary of the aul was often defined by the façades of residential buildings and tower structures, which limited the number of entrances and exits.

The layout of a settlement reflected the clan-based social structure of Chechen society. Residential buildings belonging to related families were typically grouped together, forming distinct clusters within the settlement. These groups were connected by passages and shared courtyards, without forming clearly defined urban blocks.

== Cultic and ritual structures ==
=== Council of the Country ===
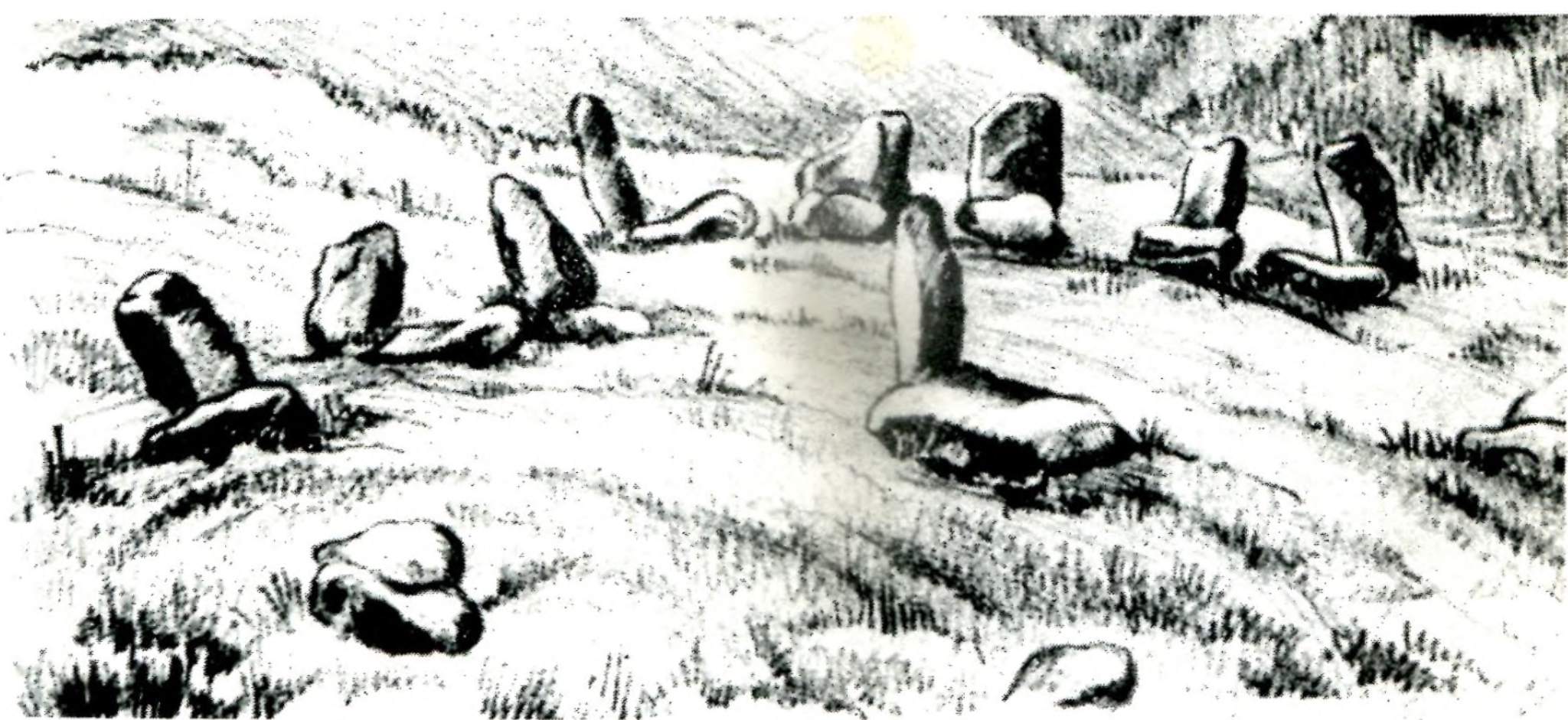
Place of Council of the Country assemblies (Mehk-Khel), equipped with stone seats; high-mountain region of Chechnya, near Khevsureti. Drawing by architect N. M. Fukin, 1938.

Mehk-Khel (Chechen: Mehk-Khel; lit. “Council of the Country”, “Court of the Land”) was the supreme communal and judicial assembly of traditional Chechen society, attested from the medieval period and functioning until the mid-19th century. Within the system of customary self-government, Chechen territorial communities (teip) delegated to it judicial and executive authority on matters of collective importance.

Mehk-Khel was not associated with a permanent architectural structure. Its sessions were held at specifically designated locations that possessed long-established tradition and public significance. These places typically consisted of open communal areas, often situated on elevated ground in mountainous regions, and were equipped with stone seats (“stone chairs”) intended for members of the assembly. Such sites were used for the adjudication of inter-clan disputes, the resolution of legal cases, and deliberation on broader political and legal issues affecting Chechen society as a whole.

A number of Mehk-Khel meeting places were regarded as ancient sacred locations. Historical and ethnographic sources indicate that, in pre-Islamic periods, some of these sites functioned as pagan sanctuaries where priests convened; in later times, the same locations were reinterpreted as venues for sessions of the Council of the Country. Cult buildings and shrines associated with these places frequently bore the names of legendary priests or revered ancestors.

Historical sources record several specific sites associated with meetings of Mehk-Khel, predominantly in the highland regions of Chechnya. These include Maysta, Mizir-Korta, Khetash-Korta (in the vicinity of the village of Tsontaroy), as well as other traditional assembly places that formed part of the broader ritual and communal landscape of Chechen lands.

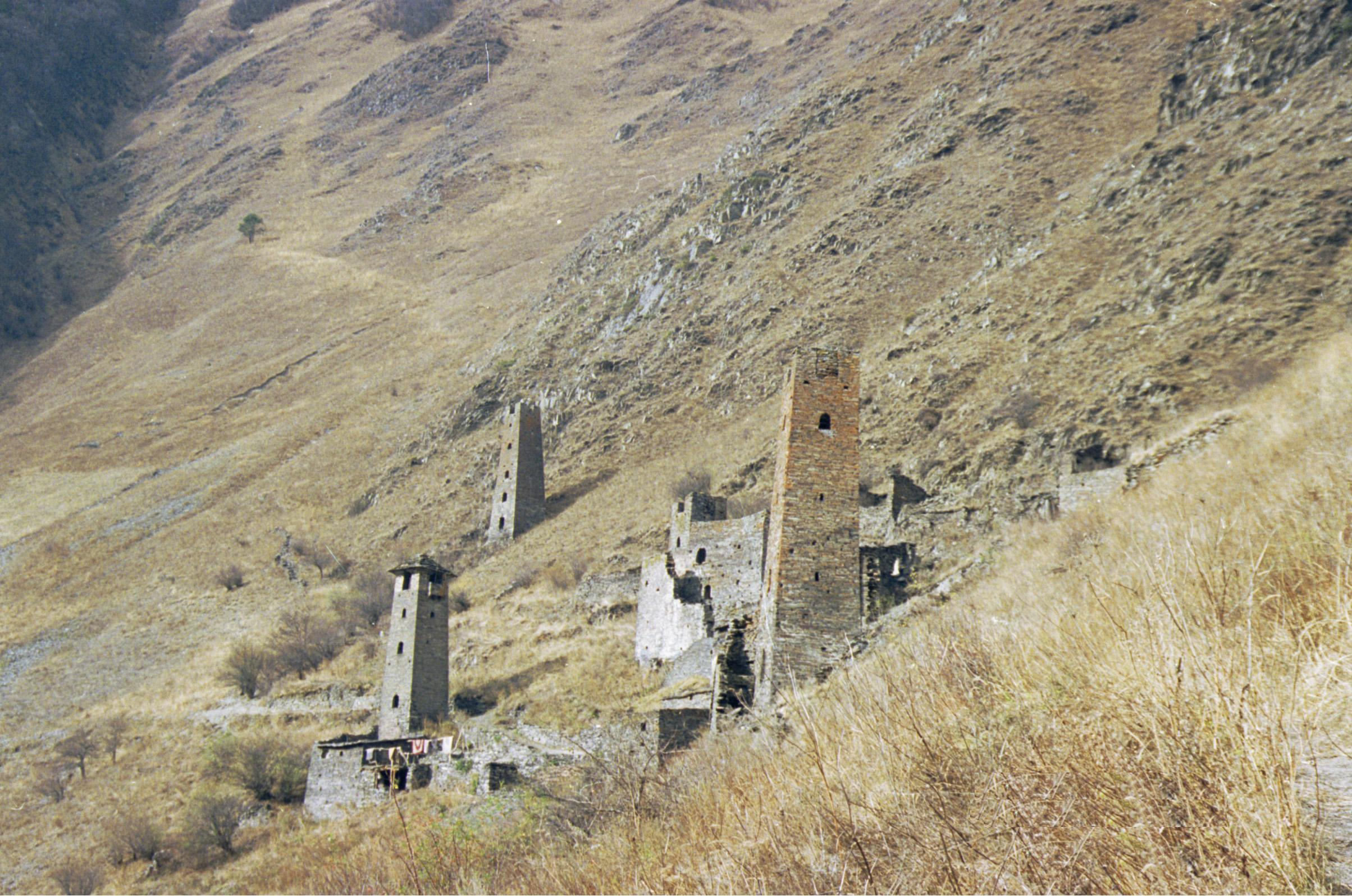
Ruins of the Puoga in Maysta

I. M. Saidov identified the following locations where sessions of the Mehk-Khel (Council of the Country) were held:

- Maysta (in the Chanty-Argun river basin, a tributary of the Argun);
- Mount Mizir-Korta (near Galanchozh);
- Akka (in the present-day Galanchozh District);
- the Kei area (south of Galanchozh);
- Mount Yukkhera-Lam;
- Nashkha (in the upper reaches of the Gekhi River);
- Mount Khetash-Korta (near the village of Tsontaroy);
- Germenchuk;
- Mount Ertan-Korta;
- Shali;
- Aldy (in the area of present-day Grozny);
- Gekhi (on the Gekhi River);
- Chechen (on the Argun River);
- Sozha-Gala (near present-day Grozny);
- Shircha-Yurt;
- the Muit-Khera / Muit-Kera area (in the Fortanga River basin);
- Zhemi-Borz Hill (on Suyr-Korta hill);
- Hankali-Barz Hill (at the entrance to the Khankala Gorge);
- Alambos (near the Tatartup Minaret on the Terek River);
- Shinasyuiran-Yukh

=== Communal sundial platforms ===
Sundials in the settlement of Khimoy constitute a monument of traditional astronomical knowledge. Their existence reflects not merely a utilitarian task—the measurement of time—but a deep integration of temporal reference points into the cultural, economic, and cosmological system of the Chechens.

As noted by Z. A. Madaeva, Chechens “showed great interest in time reckoning” and developed a complex system of calculation linked to the seasonality of agricultural labour, solar and lunar cycles, the appearance of celestial bodies, and the movement of shadows. Stone-built sundials with a vertical gnomon at the centre were used not only as practical instruments but also as elements of a worldview in which the movement of the Sun was perceived as sacred. A particularly illustrative example of such observational practices is recorded in Melkhista, in the upper reaches of the Argun River, on the territory of the Tsoi-Pede necropolis. At the edge of a promontory stand two pillar-shaped sanctuaries—four-sided columns constructed of slate bonded with lime-sand mortar. In the late medieval period, inhabitants of Melkhista used these structures to observe the Sun.

Moments of the solstices held particular significance. According to folk beliefs, “the sun stays at home” for three days and three nights during these periods. This notion reflected an understanding of the Sun as a living entity possessing “two homes”—a summer and a winter one.

The sundial at Khimoy consisted of a large-diameter stone circle laid out with boulders, at the centre of which stood a tall stone pillar. Its shadow moved across the circle, allowing the determination of parts of the day. Such a construction can be regarded as a vernacular analogue of a gnomon—the simplest astronomical instrument.

According to researchers, these sundials were used for practical purposes—such as determining the time of day—and also carried sacral significance associated with the veneration of the sun.

Because the time of day was also determined by shadows cast by mountain peaks for example, by the peak of Mount Juire-Duq near the Terloy, sundials formed part of a broader orientation system. This system also included notches on tower walls, marks in arches, stelae, and other simple “chronometric” devices.

== Economic infrastructure ==
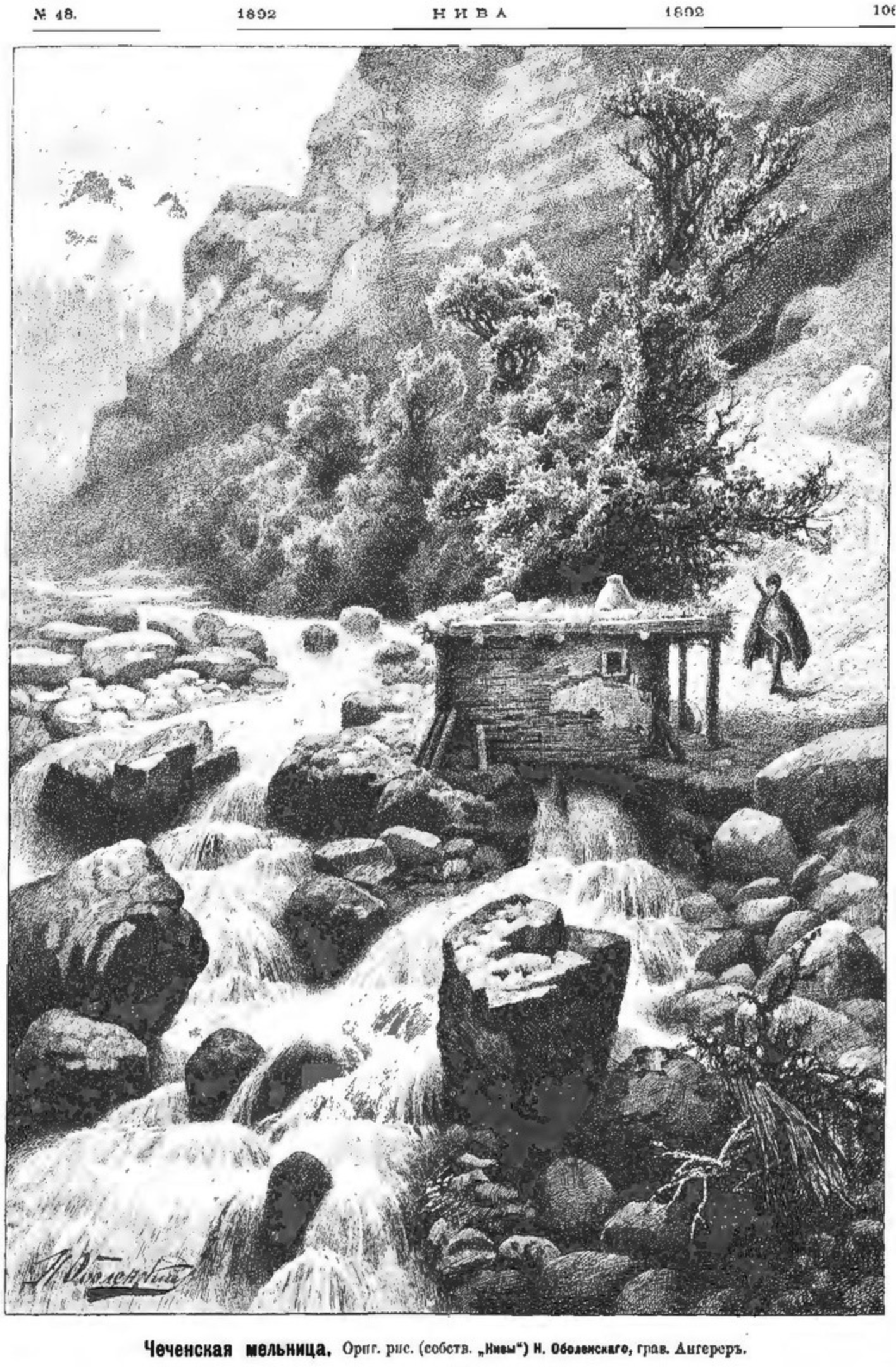
Watermill in Chechnya, 1892

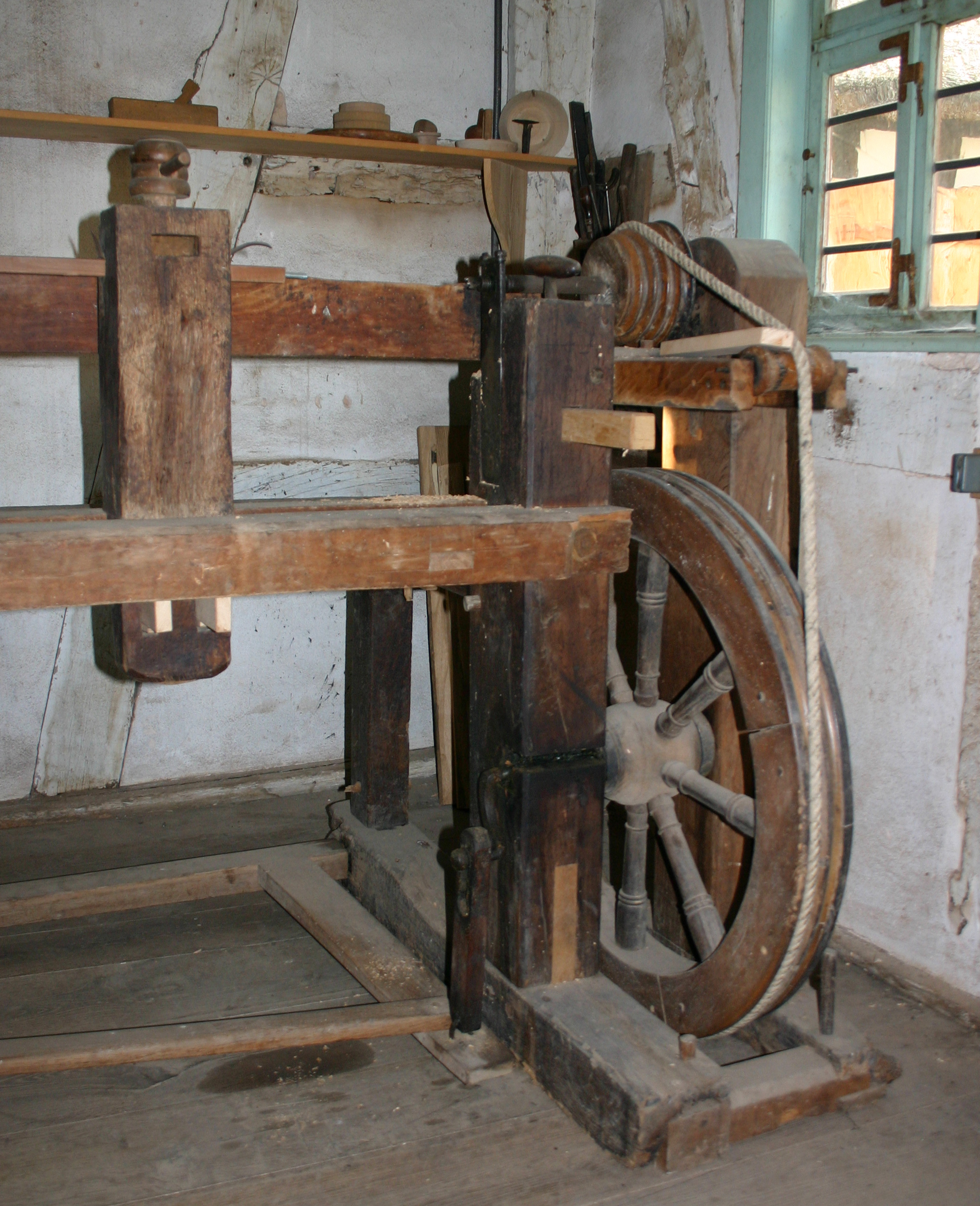
Wood lathe, Germany

=== Mills ===
According to archival and ethnographic sources, Chechnya in the 18th and early 19th centuries was rich in mills—both hand-operated and water-powered. Their widespread presence indicates a well-developed system of arable farming and grain production in both mountainous and lowland areas.

Mills were constructed on small rivers, streams, and specially dug irrigation channels (Tatol). Particularly high concentrations were recorded in lowland Chechen settlements such as Shali, Germenchuk, and Gudermes, where mills were positioned along minor watercourses. Archival reports indicate that inhabitants of neighbouring territories travelled to Chechnya to grind grain due to the absence of mills in their own settlements.

Construction

From a technical perspective, mills were divided into two main types:

- those with a horizontal water wheel installed beneath the building. Water delivered through a chute struck the paddles of the wheel, rotating it and transmitting motion via a vertical shaft to the upper millstone;
- those with a vertical water wheel, also used to drive the milling mechanism. Such installations are described in the ethnographic observations of Bruno Plaetschke, who documented mills with vertically mounted wheels driving horizontal axles.

Millstones were handmade from special hard stone slabs quarried in the mountains. Careful selection of stone suitable for grinding ensured reliable operation. As a rule, millstones were made of high-quality stone. Although the resulting flour was coarser than factory-produced flour, its quality was considered satisfactory.

Mills were typically owned by relatively prosperous households and played a key role in the rural economy. Owners often charged for milling services in the form of grain or other produce. Possession of a mill reduced dependence on neighboring communities and allowed crops to be processed locally.

Chechen craftsmen achieved a high level of skill in the construction of water mills, especially on fast-flowing mountain streams. Water was channelled through conduits and directed onto the paddles, rotating the shaft with the attached millstone. This expertise was applied beyond Chechnya itself: mill builders from Shali and Martan were invited to construct mills in neighbouring regions.

Flour of varying degrees of fineness—particularly maize flour—was distinguished by place of production. Products of Shali and Martan millers were especially valued, and their work was regarded as exemplary.

In addition to grain mills, Chechnya also employed other water-powered mechanisms of similar construction. Ethnographic sources record installations with vertical wheels rotating horizontal shafts fitted with wooden blanks—usually rounded billets intended for turning. The craftsman, working under a shelter, shaped the rotating blank with a curved knife to produce items such as wooden discs. These devices effectively functioned as water-powered lathes and demonstrate the use of hydropower for craft production beyond purely agricultural needs.

=== Terraced agriculture ===
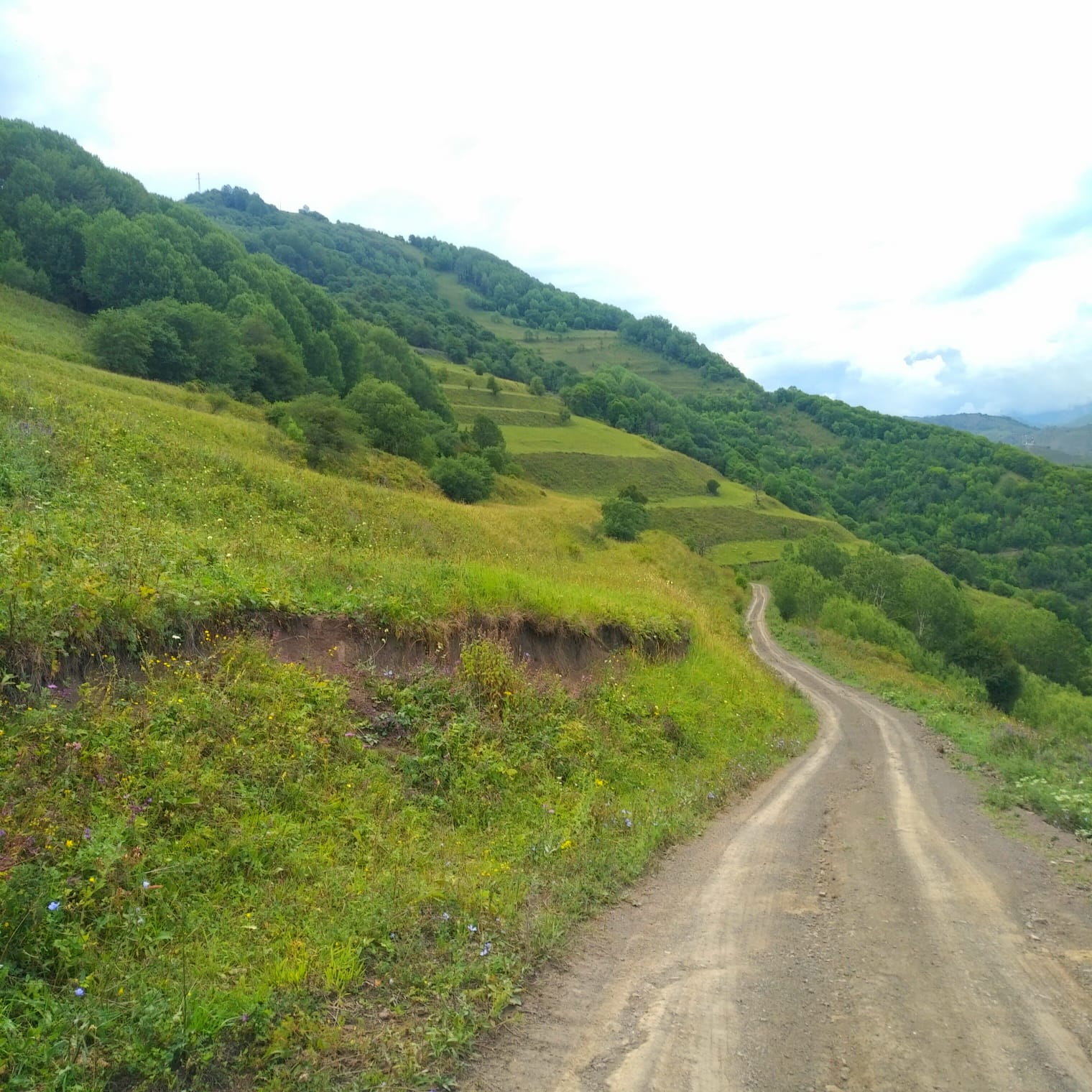
Remains of agricultural terrace formations

In the mountainous regions of Chechnya, terraced agriculture (Kha) was widely practiced. This method involved transforming hillsides and mountain slopes into stepped levels suitable for cultivation and represented a necessary adaptation to rugged terrain, scarcity of flat land, and general land shortage.

Terraces were created manually on rocky slopes, often from scratch, by transporting fertile soil from other locations. To improve yields, soils were fertilized with organic waste, including livestock manure and bird droppings (including those of wild pigeons), and supported by systems of artificial irrigation.

A wide range of crops was cultivated on terraced fields. According to ethnographic and historical sources, Chechens sowed wheat, millet , barley, maize, hemp, and tobacco. The diversity of crops reflects both subsistence needs and adaptation to different altitude zones and microclimatic conditions.

By the 18th century, terraced farming had become widespread and encompassed a significant proportion of households. Contemporary accounts attest to the high productivity of Chechen agriculture.

Arable plots were usually located close to settlements, on level river terraces and gentle slopes. Beyond them lay grazing areas and pastures, allowing for a rational organization of the agricultural landscape. The creation of terraces required considerable labor investment: clearing stones, shrubs, and trees; levelling surfaces; and constructing drainage channels for irrigation. As in other regions of the North Caucasus, irrigation in Chechnya was applied not only in mountainous areas but also in the lowlands.

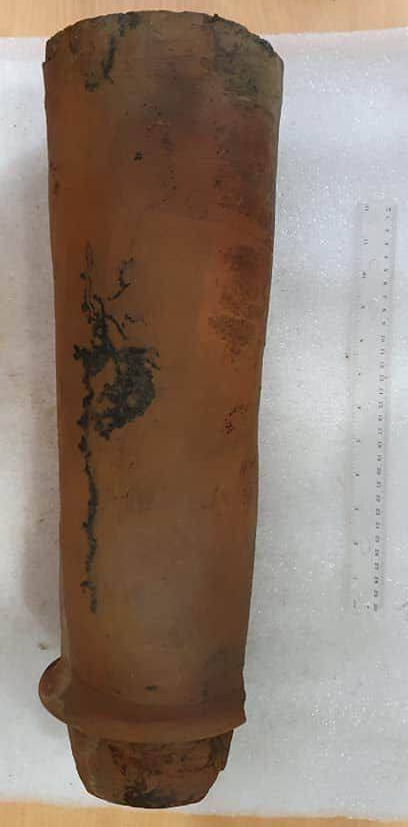
Clay drainage pipes employed for terrace irrigation systems

Agricultural productivity was likewise recorded in the lowland zones. According to the researcher I. Nordenstamm, favorable climatic conditions enabled Chechnya to exceed subsistence requirements:

“Owing to its favorable climatic conditions, Chechnya produces more grain than is necessary for the subsistence of its population, and the surplus is exchanged with neighboring regions.”

Discussing the expansion of new land areas by Chechens for artificial arable fields (terraces), S. Khasiev notes that all such fields—created through painstaking agricultural labour prior to the 19th century—were held as property either by individual owners or by communities. His ethnographic research identifies three forms of ownership of terraced arable land among the Chechens:

- communal (yuqqara mohk);
- private (dolah mohk);
- occupied/claimed (dalaetsna mohk).

Terraced agriculture thus became a crucial element of sustainable subsistence in mountain environments, supporting food security, demographic stability, and long-term habitation in hard-to-access landscapes.

The North Caucasus appears to be one of the earliest regions of terraced agriculture. Archaeological evidence associated with the Maykop culture (c. 4th millennium BCE) indicates the use of terraces already in prehistoric times.

=== Water supply systems ===
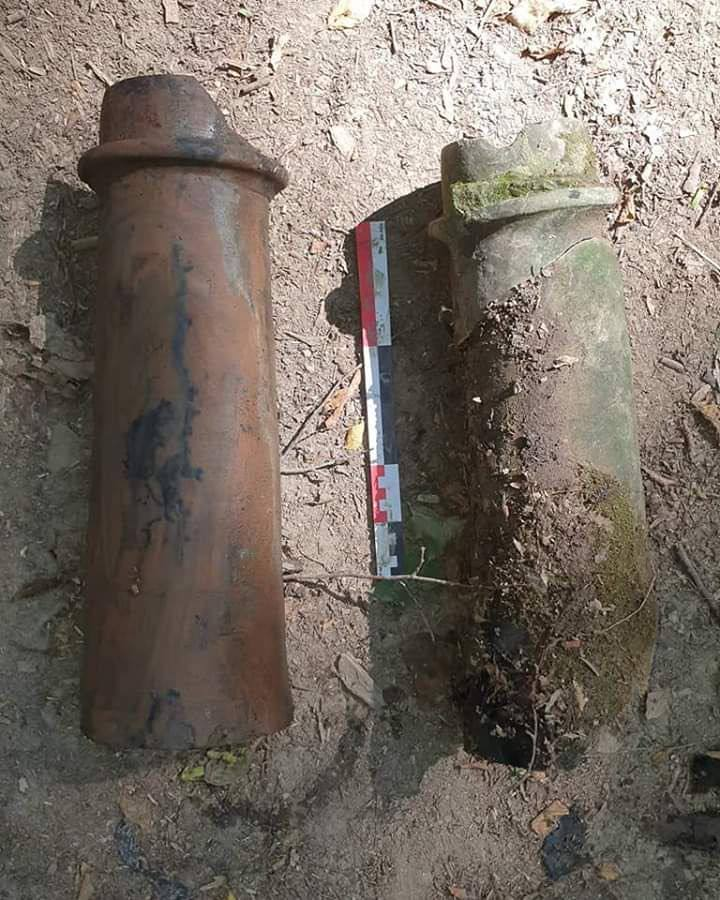
Irrigation pipes

Irrigation and water-supply systems in traditional Chechen culture resulted from the long-term accumulation of engineering knowledge adapted to complex mountain and foothill environments. Archaeological and ethnographic data record the use of irrigation channels, spring wells, and underground conduits that supplied water for agricultural irrigation and domestic use.

On mountain terraces, artificial irrigation systems directed water from streams to fields and gardens. Channels were cut into slopes in accordance with natural gradients and reinforced with stone and clay, sometimes covered with wooden troughs. These installations enabled the irrigation of limited plots on steep slopes, ensuring stable cultivation even under conditions of limited precipitation.

According to A. Pullo, a Russian Imperial general who visited Chechnya in 1839,

“...everywhere forests were cleared, and over vast stretches only sown fields remained, irrigated by skillfully constructed channels.”

Of particular interest are archaeologically documented stone and ceramic water pipes produced by local potters. Examples of black and brown ceramics tempered with bronze—apparently to increase durability—are known. These pipes were used to supply water to dwellings and craft workshops, including forges and pottery centres.

== Transport infrastructure ==
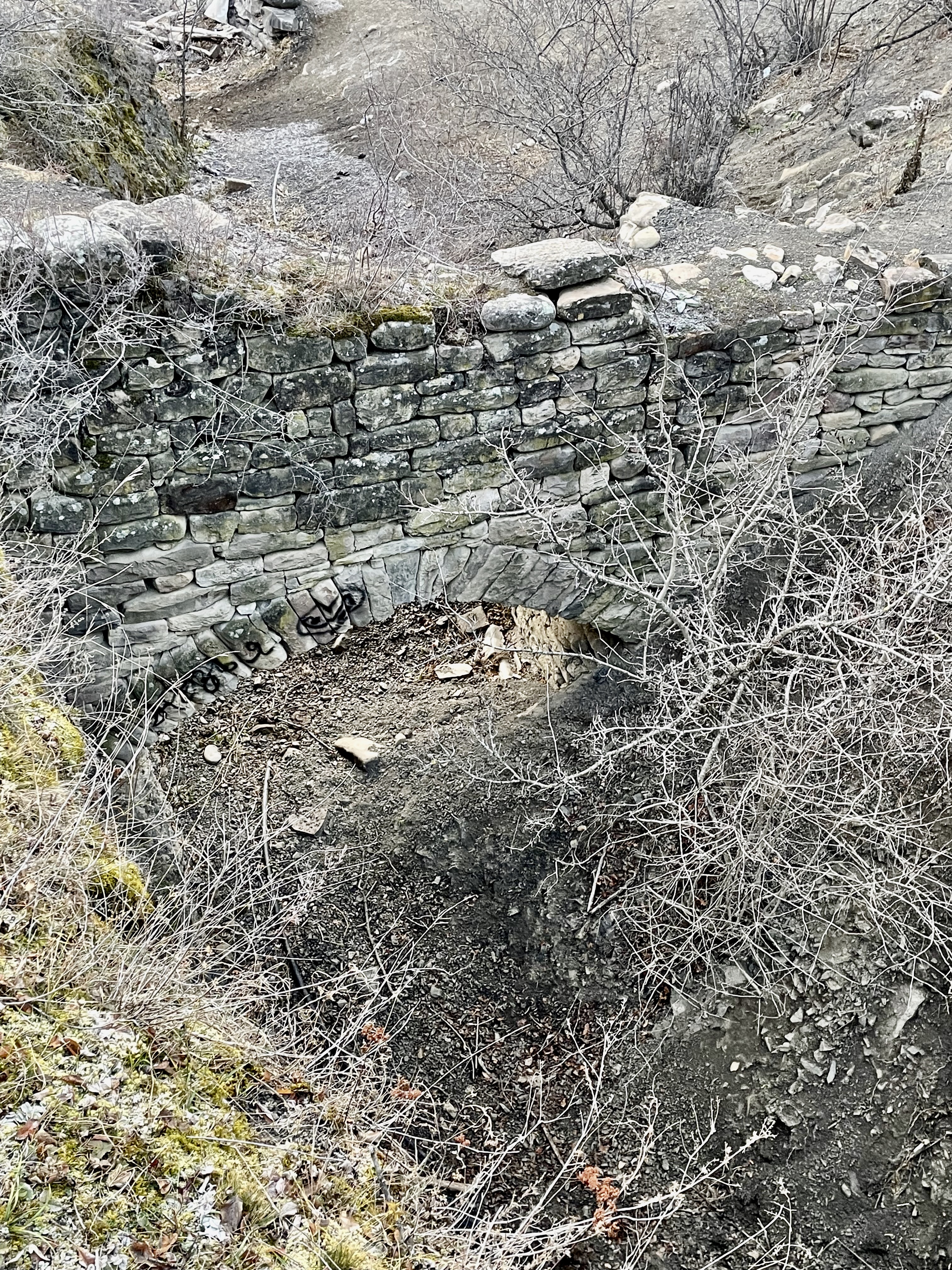
Stone Bridge in Dana-Khell

Roads and routes

From antiquity, important trade, transport, and military routes crossed the territory of Chechnya, linking the North Caucasus with Transcaucasia and Western Asia. These included sections of the Darial Pass and the Great Silk Road through the Assa Gorge, as well as the Argun, Shoh and other routes. Many of these routes took the form of well-maintained mountain paths reinforced with retaining walls and stone masonry, in some places paved, and equipped with bridges, water reservoirs, resting shelters, “guest towers,” and small roadside shrines.

Over many centuries, Chechens developed a system for protecting and maintaining these routes. Defensive barriers and stone walls were erected, guard services operated, road tolls were collected, and trade caravans and envoys were escorted. The most powerful Chechen tower and castle complexes were often located along major transport arteries and were controlled primarily by the local feudal elite, who derived stable income from overseeing these strategically vital routes.

=== Travel practices and limitations ===
In foothill and mountain Chechnya, the organisation of movement and communication was shaped primarily by terrain and long-standing patterns of land use. Routes consisted mainly of narrow mountain paths adapted for pedestrians and pack animals, following river valleys, ridgelines, and natural passes.

Along these routes developed a system of traditional roadside infrastructure intended to support travel in difficult conditions. This included resting shelters, small auxiliary buildings, bridges and temporary crossings, as well as durable stone markers and other fixed features indicating safe passages, stopping points, and key locations along the road network. Together, these elements formed a functional system that facilitated movement across mountainous landscapes despite the absence of formal road engineering.

Bridges

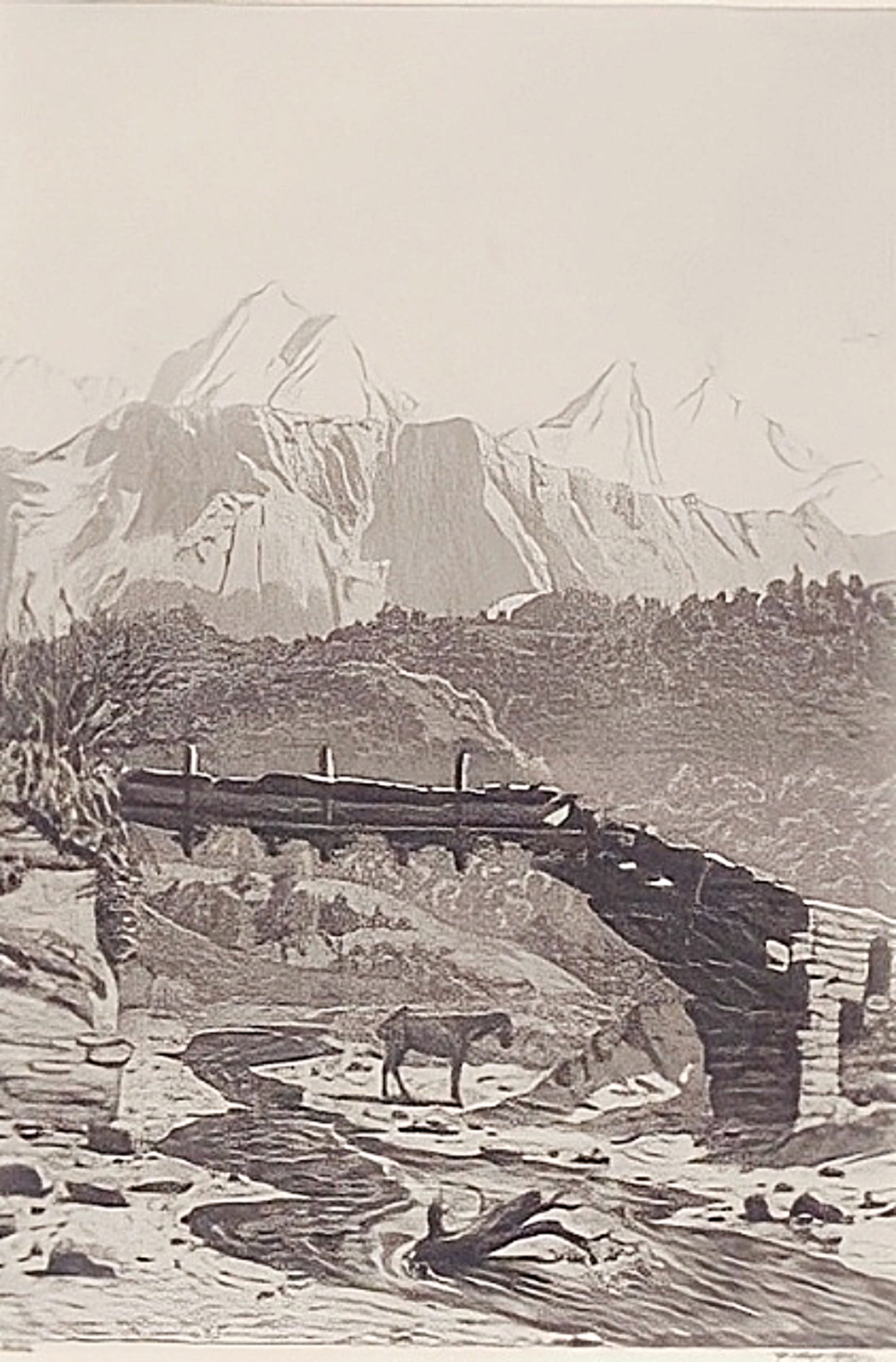
Wooden bridge in Chechnya

In traditional Chechen culture, bridges constituted an integral part of both engineering and socio-economic infrastructure. In the context of rugged mountainous terrain and the abundance of rivers and ravines, Chechens developed a well-established tradition of stone and wooden bridge construction, adapted to a wide range of natural and climatic conditions.

=== Stone bridges ===
The most durable structures were stone arch bridges, widespread in mountainous and foothill areas. Typically, they consisted of a single arch built of dressed stone, massive abutments integrated into riverbanks, and a flat deck of stone or compacted earth. These bridges were designed for pedestrians, pack animals, and light transport and demonstrate a sound understanding of load distribution and structural stability.

Such bridges were designed for pack animals, pedestrians, and light transport. Their architecture demonstrates a clear understanding of load distribution, balance, and structural stability.

A notable example is the stone bridge in the village of Gekhi, described in 1907 by Terskiye vedomosti as a substantial and well-engineered structure adapted to seasonal flooding. Stone bridges are also reliably attested at Mulkoy, Dana-Khell, in the area of Gukhoy, and across the Chanty-Argun, Argun, Iärzha-Akh, and other rivers.

=== Wooden bridges ===
Alongside stone bridges, wooden bridges were widely used, particularly in forested, low-mountain, and lowland areas. They were built from local timber—primarily oak, ash, beech, and hornbeam. Designs ranged from simple log decks over streams to more complex beam structures on stone supports. Many were seasonal or temporary, though in forested regions some remained in use for decades.

== Architectural schools and master builders ==
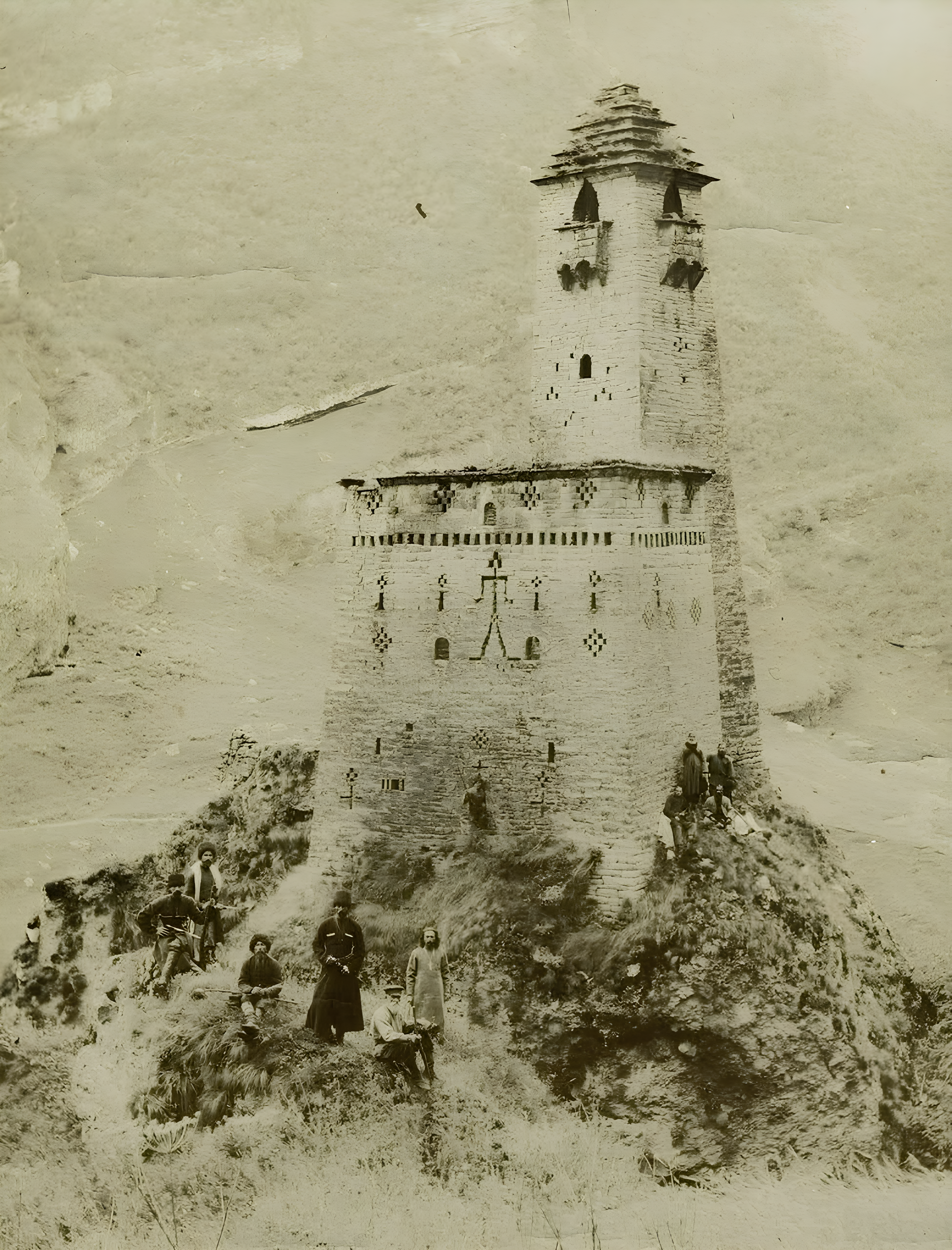
Diskhi Tower, Akka, late 19th century

=== Notable architects and building lineages ===
Scholars note that the peak of Chechen stone construction dates to the Middle Ages. Significant contributions to the study of this tradition were made by archaeologists and ethnographers such as E. Krupnov, V. Markovin, S. Umarov, M. Muzhukhoev, K. Mamaev, I. Magomadov, D. Chakhkiev, and L. Ilyasov, among others.

According to D. Chakhkiev, folk tradition preserves a legend attributing the construction of tower complexes to a master builder named Chochkar from the village of Tuga. This tradition reflects the long-term continuity and transmission of architectural knowledge within hereditary building lineages.

Historical and ethnographic studies record the activity of individual master builders distinguished by a high level of stone-working skill. In the Khacharoi community, a master known as Muti is associated with the construction of several residential and combat towers in the Argun Gorge. In the highland region of Maysta, the names of master builders include Iton, Eta, Gaspar, Chochkar, Azsher, and Bagat. The tradition further preserves the name of Diskhi, who is noted in the literature for exceptional expertise in stone construction.

These masters not only built towers but also transmitted skills through hereditary practice, forming stable craft schools. As noted by S. Umarov, construction was strictly organized: architects and masons constituted separate roles, as did quarry workers and stone cutters. Tools were relatively simple—heavy metal bars and sledgehammers for quarrying, and hammers, chisels, and picks for stone cutting. Stone was regarded as communal property, and its extraction was regulated.

Tower construction was commissioned only by wealthy patrons, with costs reaching the equivalent of 50–70 cattle. The right to build a combat tower with a stepped pyramidal roof was reserved for the “best house” in a settlement—that is, the most influential family.

=== Regional features of architectural styles ===
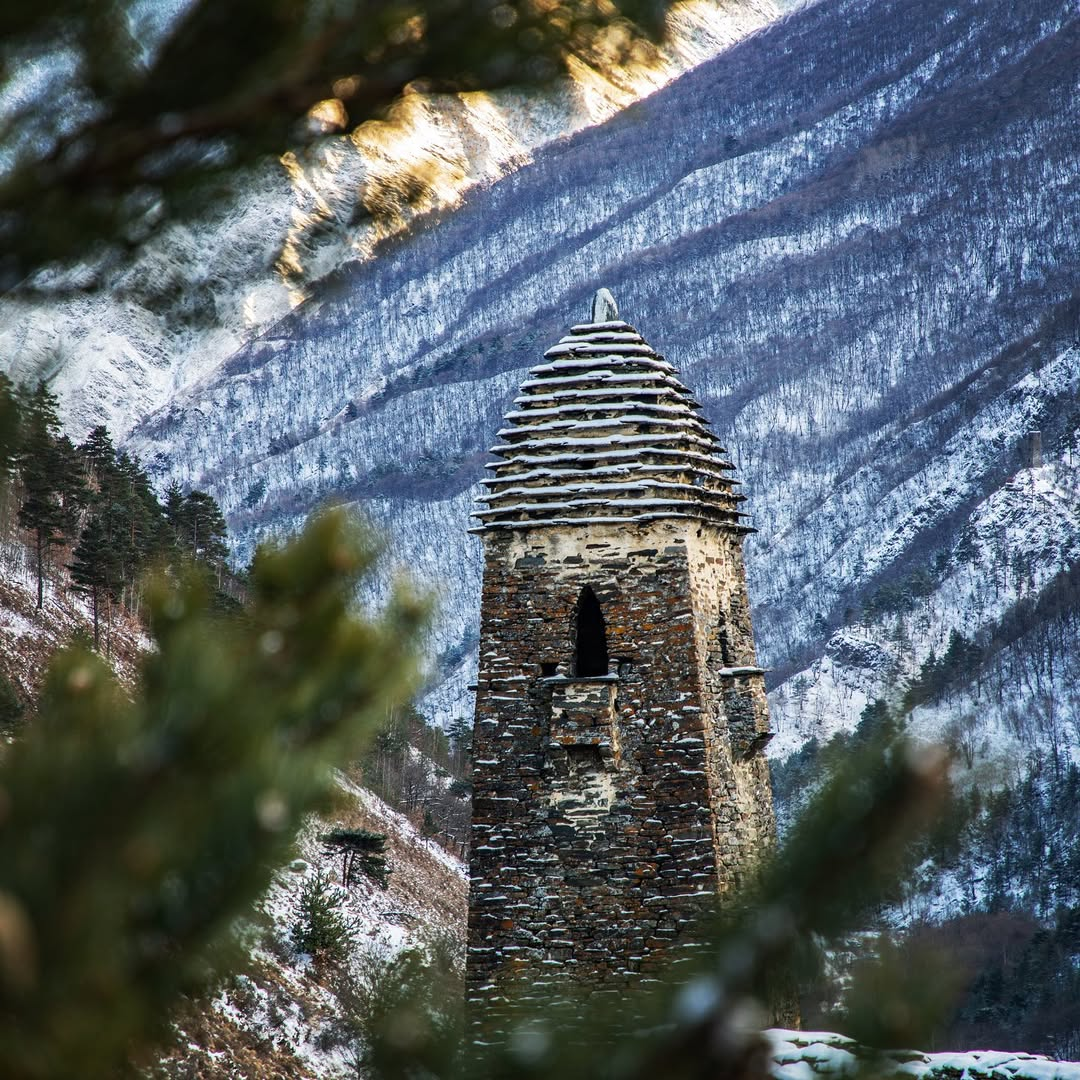
Pyramidal stepped roof of Chechen combat tower

Crowning roofs Architectural surveys indicate that the number of steps in the crowning stone roofs of Chechen combat towers ranges from 4 to 16. In Ingushetia, by contrast, the number is generally more restricted, typically 13–15.

Machicolations (Cherh) Combat towers feature machicolations supported by two to five stone consoles. In Ingush towers, machicolations are usually supported by only two or three consoles. Unlike those of North Ossetia and Ingushetia—where, according to A. F. Goldstein, machicolations were often extremely small and possibly decorative—Chechen combat towers typically possess fully functional defensive machicolations resting on three or four stone consoles. Their design allowed two to three defenders to engage attackers simultaneously. In contrast, the limited dimensions of the upper tiers in many Ingush towers with stepped pyramidal roofs often prevented even a single defender from effectively using a machicolation.

Petroglyphs In contrast to Ingush towers, Chechen combat towers display a substantial corpus of stone petroglyphs documented on their masonry. These include spiral motifs (recorded at the Sharoy, Shatoy, and Khaskalin towers), handprint impressions (Dere, Guchan-Kale, Khaibakh, and Kharkaroy), crosses and swastika-like solar symbols (Khaibakh and Makazhoy I), as well as figurative representations of mounted riders (Etkaly castle) and hunting scenes (Makazhoy II).

== Role in contemporary cultural identity ==
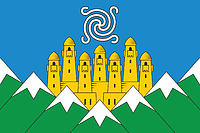
Chechen combat towers and petroglyphs are depicted on a number of official symbols, including the flag of the Sharoysky District, reflecting their established role in regional visual identity.

Tower architecture occupies a prominent place in Chechen cultural identity. Combat and residential towers built over centuries in the highlands of Chechnya represent both the technical traditions of defensive construction and enduring symbols associated with collective memory, honour, and historical continuity.

The importance of these structures extends beyond their original military function. Towers function as visual reference points within the landscape and are closely associated in Chechen tradition with lineage (taip), ancestral territory, and the protection of the household. Variations in carving, symbolic motifs, height, and roof form distinguished individual towers and reflected both aesthetic preferences and the social standing of their patrons.

Towers also appear consistently in oral tradition, poetry, and modern cultural production, where they are commonly associated with resilience and continuity. Their imagery is widely employed in municipal heraldry, flags, and the emblems of cultural organisations, indicating their established role as a shared visual emblem within Chechen society.

Accordingly, Chechen towers may be regarded not only as architectural monuments but also as elements of historical memory that contribute to the maintenance of cultural continuity across generations.

== See also ==
- Khevsureti, Tusheti, Ananuri
- Svan towers
- San Gimignano
- Tower houses in the Balkans
- Nuraghi
- Irish round tower
- Himalayan Towers

== Literature ==
- Plaetschke, Bruno (1929). Schultz, Arved (ed.). Die Tschetschenen: Forschungen zur Völkerkunde des nordöstlichen Kaukasus auf Grund von Reisen in den Jahren 1918–20 und 1927/28. Veröffentlichungen des Geographischen Instituts der Universität Königsberg Pr. (in German). Vol. Heft XI. Hamburg: Friederichsen, de Gruyter & Co.
- Goldstein, Arkady (1977). Bashni v gorakh [Towers in the Mountains] (in Russian). Moscow: Sovetskii khudozhnik. p. 336.
- Goldstein, Arkady (1975). Medieval Architecture of Chechen-Ingushetia and North Ossetia (in Russian). Moscow: Nauka. p. 157.
- Piotrovsky, Boris, ed. (1988). History of the Peoples of the North Caucasus from Ancient Times to the End of the 18th Century. History of the Peoples of the North Caucasus (in Russian). Moscow: Nauka. ISBN 5-02-009486-2.
- Vinogradov; Markovin (1966). Arkheologicheskie pamyatniki Checheno-Ingushskoi ASSR [Archaeological Monuments of the Chechen–Ingush ASSR (Materials for an Archaeological Map)] (in Russian). Vol. Tom X. Grozny: Checheno-Ingushskoe knizhnoe izdatelstvo. p. 156.
- Vinogradov, Vitaly; Muzhukhoev, M. B., eds. (1984). Settlements and Dwellings of the Peoples of Chechen-Ingushetia (in Russian). Grozny: Chechen-Ingush Institute of History, Sociology and Philology.
- Velikaya, N.; Vinogradov, Vitaly; Khasbulatova, A.; Chakhkiev, D. (1990). Aliroev, I. Yu. (ed.). Ocherki etnografii chechentsev i ingushei (dorevoliutsionnyi period) [Essays on the Ethnography of the Chechens and Ingush (Pre-Revolutionary Period)] (in Russian). Grozny: Chechen-Ingushskii gosudarstvennyi universitet im. L. N. Tolstogo. p. 96.
- Markovin, Vladimir, ed. (1980). The North Caucasus in Antiquity and the Middle Ages (in Russian). Moscow: Nauka.
- Markovin, Vladimir (1969). V strane vainakhov [In the Land of the Vainakhs] (in Russian). Moscow: Iskusstvo. p. 120.
- Shavlaeva, Tamara (2017). Iz istorii razvitiya kul'tury khozyaystvennoy deyatel'nosti chechenskogo naroda (XIX — nachalo XX vv.) Из истории развития культуры хозяйственной деятельности чеченского народа (XIX — начало XX вв.) [On the History of the Development of the Culture of Economic Activity of the Chechen People (19th – early 20th centuries)] (Doctoral dissertation (Doctor of Historical Sciences)) (in Russian).
- Ilyasov, Lecha (2024). Petroglyphs of Chechnya as a source for the history of the material and spiritual culture of the population of the North Caucasus (1st millennium BCE – second half of the 2nd millennium CE) (Doctoral dissertation (Doctor of Historical Sciences)) (in Russian). Moscow: N. N. Miklouho-Maclay Institute of Ethnology and Anthropology, Russian Academy of Sciences.
- Ilyasov, Lecha (2009). Kul'tura chechenskogo naroda [Culture of the Chechen People] (in Russian). Moscow: Nauka. p. 264. ISBN 978-5-904549-01-5.
- Soloveva, L. T.; Tishkov, V. A.; Khasbulatova, Z. I., eds. (2012). Chechens. Peoples and Cultures (in Russian). Moscow: Nauka. p. 622. ISBN 978-5-02-038030-1.
- Smirnov, N. A., ed. (1967). Ocherki istorii Checheno-Ingushskoi ASSR [Essays on the History of the Chechen–Ingush ASSR] (in Russian). Vol. 1. Grozny: Chechen-Ingush Book Publishing House. p. 316.
- Sulimenko, S. D. (1997). Bashni Severnogo Kavkaza (simvolizatsiya prostranstva v domostroitel'nom tvorchestve gortsev) [Towers of the North Caucasus (Symbolization of Space in the House-Building Creativity of the Highlanders)] (in Russian). Vladikavkaz: Proekt-Press. p. 150. ISBN 5-88734-010-X.
- Nataev, Saipudi A. (2018). "Concerning the History of the Chechen Mehk Khel (Council of the Country)". Finno-Ugric Studies (in Russian) (1). doi:10.24158/fik.2018.1.10.
- Liddiard, Robert (2010). Medieval Castles. Coventry: History Subject Centre, University of Warwick. ISBN 978-0-9564603-2-5.
- Osmaev, Movla (2016). Chechentsy: obychai, traditsii, obryady (istoriko-kul'turnye aspekty problemy) [Chechens: Customs, Traditions, Rites (Historical and Cultural Aspects of the Problem)] (Monograph) (in Russian). Grozny: Chechen State University Publishing House. p. 176. ISBN 978-5-91127-158-9.
- Bazorkin, M. M. (1964). Pamyatniki srednevekovya v gornoi Checheno-Ingushetii [Monuments of the Middle Ages in Mountainous Chechen-Ingushetia] (in Russian). Grozny: Checheno-Ingushskoe knizhnoe izdatel'stvo. p. 27.
- Bryan, Eric (2018). "Tower Houses". History Magazine. 19 (5): 46–51. ISSN 1492-4307.
- Oreshin, Sergey (2022). "История христианства в Чечне и Ингушетии в Средние века и Новое время" (PDF). Христианское чтение (3). Санкт-Петербургская Духовная Академия: 261–273. doi:10.47132/1814-5574_2022_3_261.
