= Sharoysky District =

Sharoysky District Шаройский район (Russian)
- District

Other transcription(s)
  - Chechen: Шаройн кӏошт
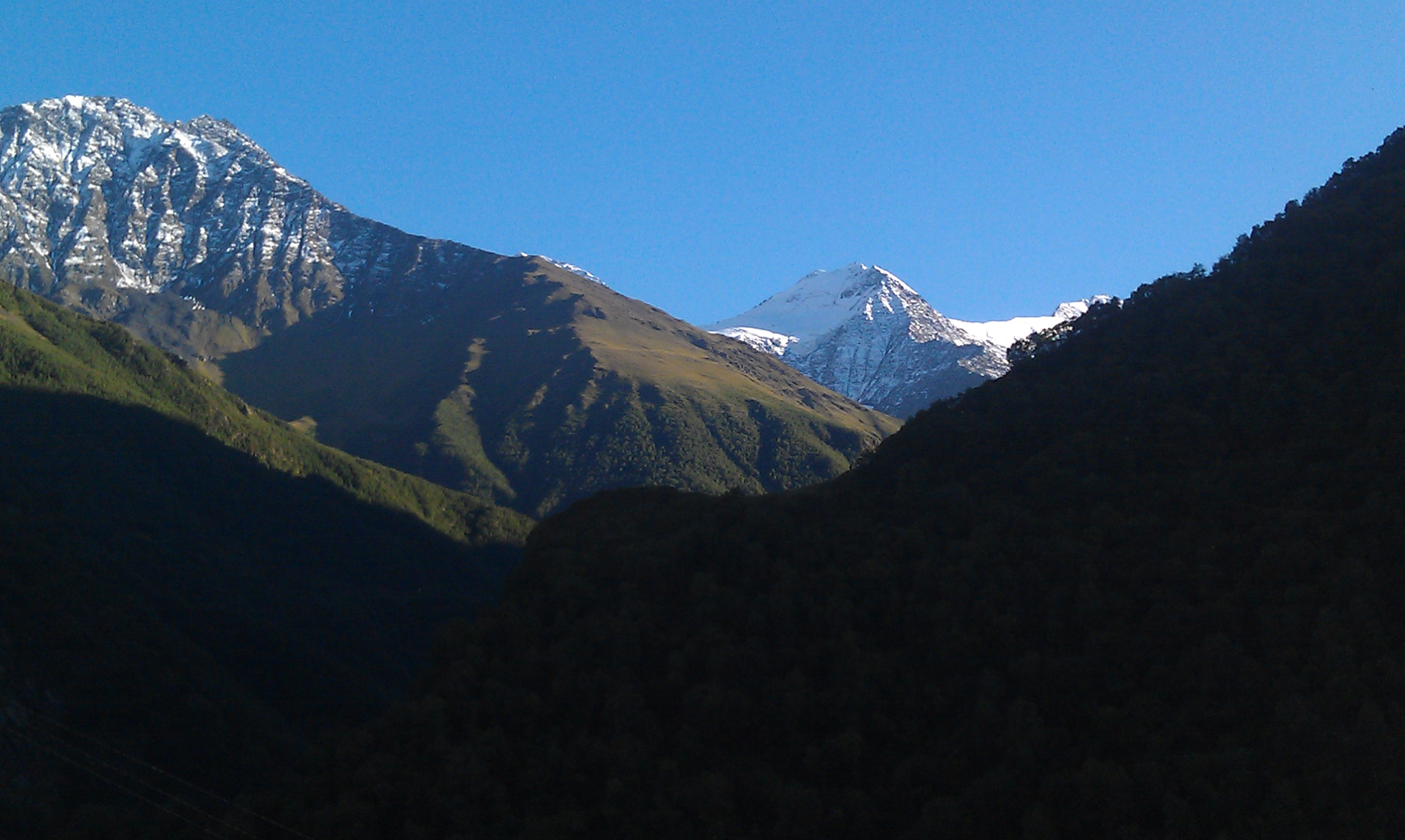
- Mountains in Sharoysky District near the selo of Khulandoy

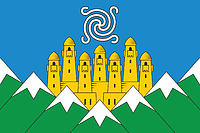
- Flag
- Location of Sharoysky District in the Chechen Republic
- Coordinates: 42°39′12″N 45°51′09″E
- Country: Russia
- Federal subject: Chechen Republic
- Established: 2000
- Administrative center: Sharoy

Area
  - Total: 400 km^{2} (150 sq mi)

Population (2010 Census)
  - Total: 3,094
  - Density: 7.7/km^{2} (20/sq mi)
  - Urban: 0%
  - Rural: 100%

Administrative structure
  - Administrative divisions: 11 rural administration
  - Inhabited localities: 11 rural localities

Municipal structure
  - Municipally incorporated as: Sharoysky Municipal District
  - Municipal divisions: 0 urban settlements, 11 rural settlements
- Time zone: UTC+3 (MSK)
- OKTMO ID: 96691000
- Website: http://admin-sharoy.ru/

Sharoysky District (Russian: Шаро́йский райо́н; Chechen: Шаройн кӏошт, Şaroyn khoşt) is an administrative and municipal district (raion), one of the fifteen in the Chechen Republic, Russia. It is located in the south of the republic. The area of the district is 400 square kilometers (150 sq mi). The administrative center of the administrative district is the rural locality (a selo) of Sharoy; however, the selo of Khimoy serves as the administrative center of the municipal district. Population: 3,094 (2010 census); 2,236 (2002 census). The population of Sharoy accounts for 9.1% of the district's total population.
