= Maysta =

Region in Chechnya

Maysta or Mäysta (Chechen: Майста, Маьйста, "highland, high-mountainous, upper territory") is a high-altitude region in the North Caucasus. Today, Maysta is a part of Galanchozhsky District, Chechnya, Russia.

Since the Middle Ages, Maysta has been known as the birthplace and historical center of the Maystoy teip. Before, Maysta and neighbouring Melkhista were a part of Georgia, but were transferred to the Chechen Autonomous Oblast in 1927. In 1944, the entire population was deported to Kazakhstan. Since then, there has been no permanent population in the region.

== Name ==
The name of Maysta translates roughly from Chechen as one of "highland, high-mountainous, upper territory". This name probably, originated from the fact Maysta is one of the most inaccessible regions of Chechnya, due to its extreme landscape and being the highest region of Chechnya above the sea level. Maysta includes the highest point in Chechnya, the summit of Mount Tebulosmta (Tebula-lam), at 4493 meters.

== Geography ==
Maysta is located on the right bank of the Chanta-Orga River, between the river and peaks of the Caucasus mountains. The Mayst-Khi River (also known as Maystoyn-Erk) flows through its territory, which is a tributary of the Chanta-Orga. Maysta is a famous region in Chechnya, known for its huge rocks, deep ravines and rivers, cold winters, as well as its wild fruit trees and bushes, dense trees, and variety of flowers in summer. It is considered to be one of the most beautiful regions in the republic.

Maysta borders Melkhista in the north, Khildekha in the east, and Georgia in the south and west.

== History ==
In the Middle Ages, Maysta was a kind of mountainous center of Chechnya. According to legend, here once lived the legendary Molkx, who is considered to be the ancestors of some Chechens, before he moved to Nashkha. The court of Mekhk-Khel existed in Maysta, which sometimes met to resolve serious and pressing issues, and to develop customary laws. For a long time, Maysta remained as a kind of cult center of Chechnya, where there stood a castle which was full of secret knowledge and skills of healers.

During the 19th century, the residents of Maysta suffered from poverty and a lack of land, and would periodically migrate to other regions, mainly to Georgia. During this time, many Maystoy were engaged in sheep breeding, and would raid Georgia for profit. From the former greatness of Maysta, the warlike character of its inhabitants remains, as well as many stone buildings dating from the XII-XIV centuries.

== Auls ==
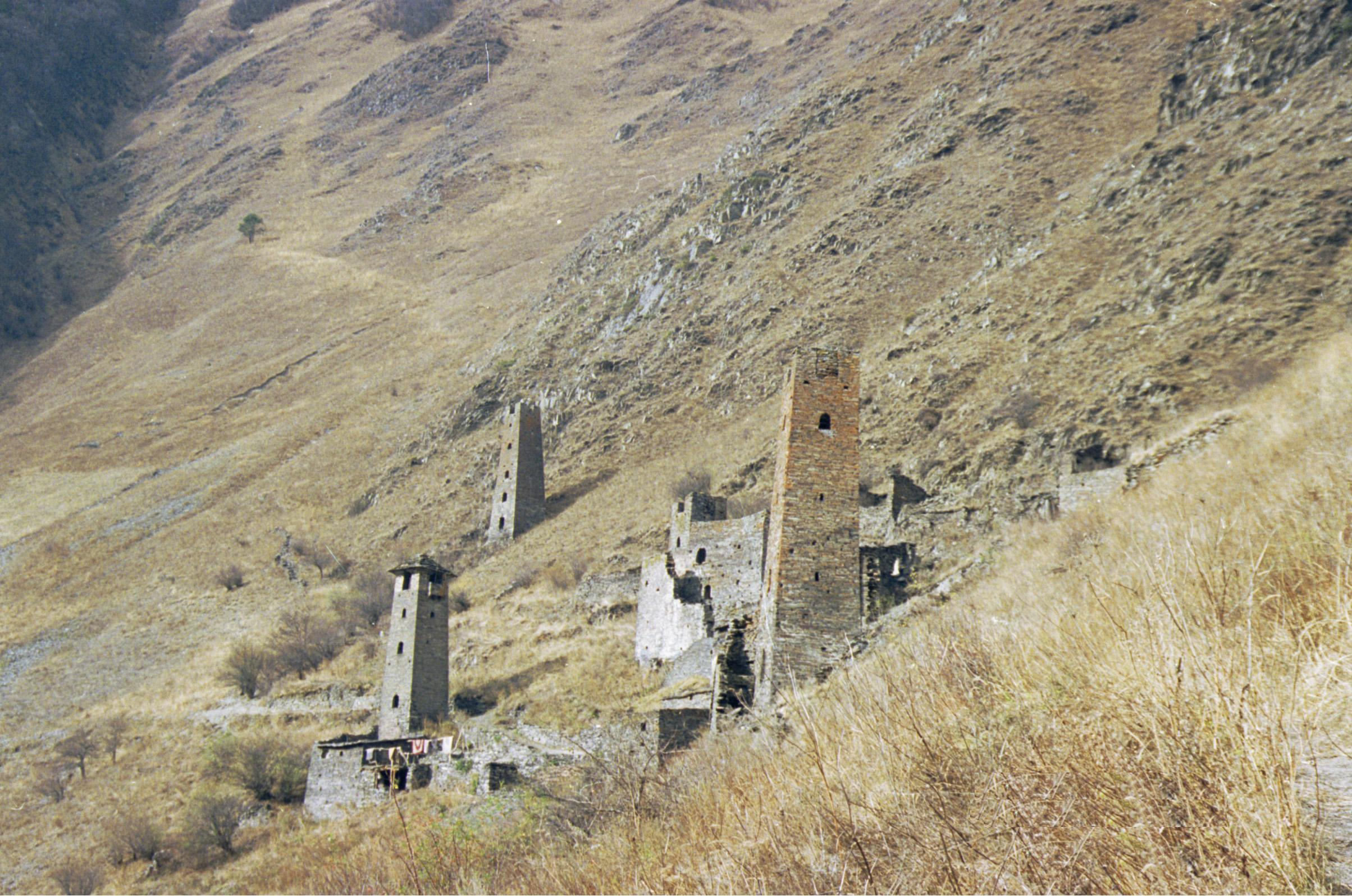
Ruins of the village of Puoga in Maysta

In Maysta, there are four major auls, of which three had a permanent population until 1944. There are also ruins of at least 5 other villages and tower complexes. In 1944, during the genocide and deportation of the Chechen and Ingush people, Maysta was abandoned. Like in many mountainous regions of Chechen-Ingush ASSR, the interiors of the residential and battle towers were burned, some of the buildings were destroyed. In 1957, when the Vaynakh people returned, former residents were forbidden to settle in the area. There has been no permanent population in Maysta since 1944. Each of the former villages are built in hard-to-reach places which are in strategic defensive positions.

=== Vasar-Kella ===
The ruins of the medieval tower village of Vasar-Kella, lie on a high stone cliff on the right bank of the Mayst-Khi River. The ruins of the stone towers form the outline of the castle that once stood here. At the very top of the cliff, there is a battle tower, from which all of Vasar-Kella can be viewed, as well as the towers in Tse-Kella and Puoga. On the western outskirts of the village, towers stand next to the path that runs next to the river. Not far from Vasar-Kella, the "city of the dead", Tsoy-Peda necropolis stands, where there are more than 50 crypts.

Historically, Vasar-Kella was located at the intersection of the route from Dagestan to the Argun gorge, and from Chechnya to Georgia. Built with battle towers and stone walls, it was one of the most powerful and impenetrable fortresses to enemies in all of Chechnya and, in the event of an attack, 1000 to 1500 well-trained soldiers could be prepared here. It was nicknamed as the "fortress of the brave". According to legend, the village fell when it was captured by the Persians in a very well coordinated attack during the Middle Ages where, the guards were killed during the approach. After that, Vasar-Kella was abandoned, no one has lived there since. At present, Vasar-Kella is located far away from roads or people.

=== Tse-Kella ===
To the west of Vasar-Kella, on a gentle slope on the right bank of the Mayst-Khi River, the village of Tse-Kella stands. The name of the village translates roughly from Chechen as "a village dedicated to the deity Tsu". The complex is a castle-type defensive complex, consisting of one battle tower and nine residential towers. The battle tower is a classic version of the Vaynakh tower, with a pyramidal roof, which is completed by a cone-shaped stone, a tsurku (Chechen: цIурку). It is believed that, for the installation of such a stone, in addition to the usual payment, the tower owner had to give to the master a bull. The stone has a magical and cult significance. From Tse-Kella, the towers of Vasar-Kella and Puoga can be seen. In the event of an attack - danger signals could be seen between the villages, as residents would light a fire on top of the battle towers.

The residential towers of Tse-Kella are considered to be semi-combat, as they are much taller than the usual residential towers, and they have balconies - mashikuli. The battle and residential towers formed a castle complex, and the gaps between the buildings are covered by stone walls. In the courtyard of the castle, there is a well-preserved sieling, which is a pillar-shaped sanctuary, from which the residents prayed, asked for help in business, made sacrifices. But the sieling had no meaning for a long time and was preserved as a tribute to the past, as were the crypts in which the Maystoy buried their dead before converting to Islam, so as not to deface the honour of their ancestors.

Tse-Kella still has many symbols of pagan beliefs of the Nakh people, as Islam entered the area very late. On the walls of the towers, many petroglyphs exist, in the forms of spirals, solar signs, figures of people and, one of the most important symbols - the image of a hand, which was obligatory on towers. There is also a petroglyphic letter on one wall of the tower, a kind of ancient Chechen writing, which has still not been deciphered by scientists.

=== Puoga ===
To the west of Vasar-Kella and Tse-Kella, on the left bank of the Mayst-Khi river, stands the village of Puoga, which includes 6 historical battle towers and many residential buildings. Puoga is several smaller tower complexes, of which each one forms a powerful and well-defended castle, consisting of one battle tower and several residential towers. The towers in Puoga are built with very good knowledge of fortification and defense. Puoga has the highest number of preserved battle towers out of all villages in Chechnya.

=== Tuga ===
To the south of Puoga, on the left bank of the Mayst-Khi river, stands the village of Tuga, which included 4 historical battle towers and many residential buildings. It is built in similar way as Puoga. It is the furthest to the west of all the Maystoy villages.

=== Kocha ===
The southernmost village of the Maystoy society is the aul Kocha, located at the very source of the Mayst-Khi river. There are different theories about Kocha, some say that the village was inhabited all year, others that it was used only during the winter. The village appears on a number of maps until 1944.
