= Khimoy =

Rural locality in Chechnya, Russia

Coordinates: 42°39′22″N 45°51′06″E

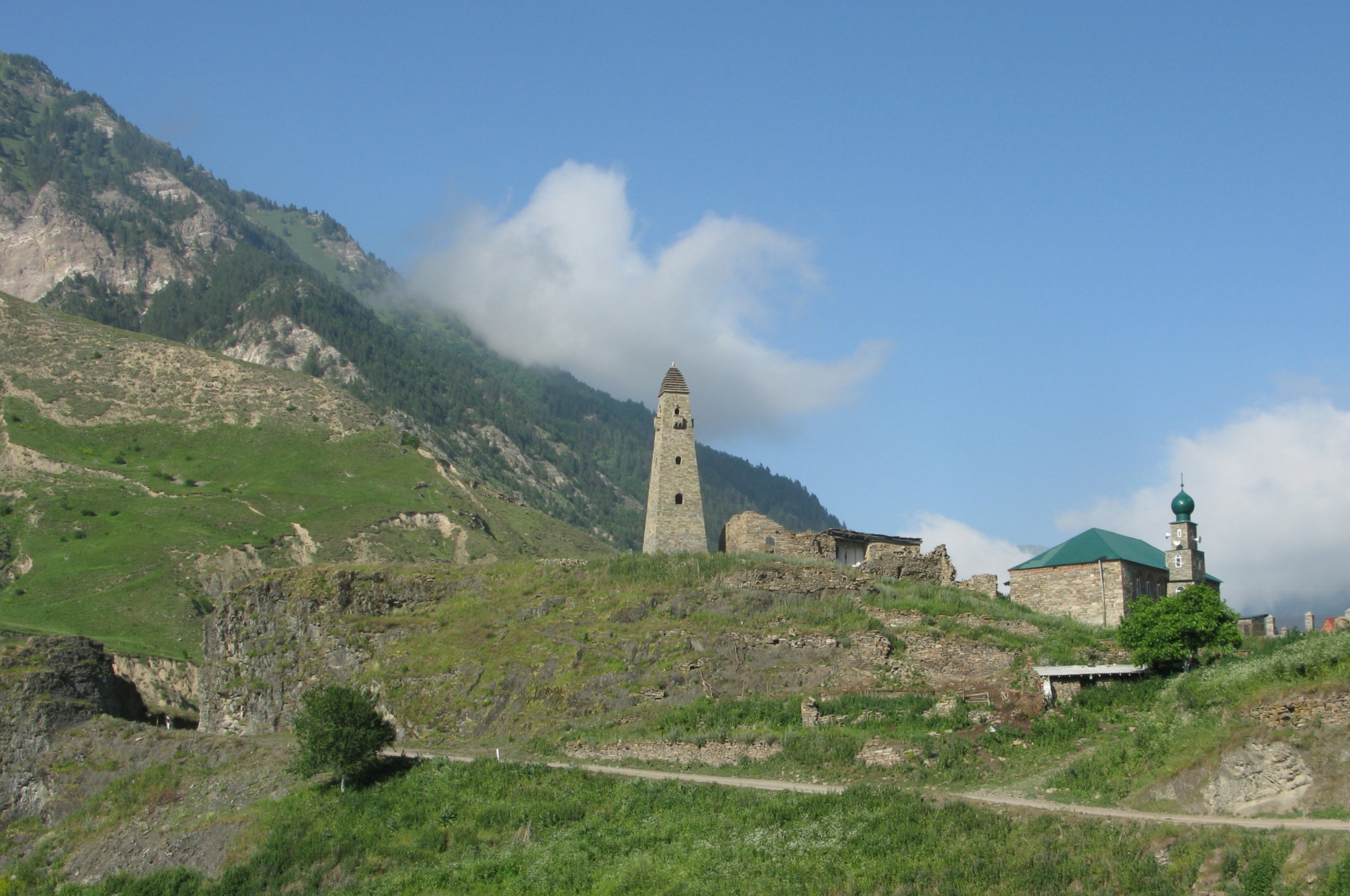
Development of the village of Khimoy (Chechen Republic, Shali, the village of Khimoy, from the village of Shatoi along the mountain road to the village of Khimoy)

Khimoy (Russian: Химой, Chechen: ХӀима, Hima) is a rural locality (a selo) and the administrative center of Sharoysky Municipal District, the Chechen Republic, Russia. (The selo of Sharoy serves as the administrative center of Sharoysky District). Population: 309 (2010 census);
