= Melkhista =

Historical region on the territory of modern day Chechnya

Melkhista Маьлхиста Мелхисте
- Historical region
- Historical Malkhista
- Coordinates: 42°44′N 45°13′E
- Country: Chechnya
- District: Galanchozhsky

Melkhista (Note: also spelled Malkhista; Chechen: Маьлхиста, romanized: Mälkhista; Ingush: Мелхисте, romanized: Melkhiste: lit. Land of the Sun) is a high-altitude historical region in the North Caucasus, located in the gorge of the same name. Today, Melkhista is a part of Motskaroyskoye rural settlement in Galanchozhsky District, Chechnya.

Since the Middle Ages, Melkhista has been known as the birthplace and historical center of the Melkhi tukkhum, one of the nine Chechen tukkhums. In 1944, the entire population was deported to Kazakhstan. Since then, there has been no permanent population in the region.

== Name ==
The name of Melkhista translates roughly from Chechen as "Edge of the Sun" (Chechen word "маьлх" - sun, and Chechen word "иста" - edge) It is possible that this name comes from how many of the villages in Melkhista are built on the slope of Mount Kora-Lam, however, there are other alternate hypothesis on the origin of the name.

== Geography ==
Melkhista is in the gorge of the same name. It is located on the left bank of the Chanta-Orga River, and the Meshe-Khi and Besta-Khi rivers run in the territory of the region. The length of the gorge is around 18 to 20 kilometers.

Melkhista borders on Kei-Mokhk and Terlo-Mokhk in the north, Maysta and the Chanta-Orga River in the east, Georgia in the south-west, and Tskhoroy-Mokhk and Guloy-Mokhk in the west.

== History ==
Melkhista has been populated since at least the Middle Ages. The population was relatively dense, with at least 14 small auls, which consisted of residential and tower complexes, often there was a necropolis next to them. Probably, the management of each aul was carried out by its own council of elders. N. G. Volkova, historical researcher, researched Melkhista in the 1930s, where she said that there were 16 villages including 161 courtyards. Earlier research in 1839 said that there were 11 villages in Melkhista with 177 households.

In 1944, during the genocide and deportation of the Chechen and Ingush people, Melkhista was abandoned. In 1957, when the Vaynakh people returned, former residents were forbidden to settle in the area. A number of researchers have proven that in 1944, during the deportations, a case of mass murder of civilians occurred in Melkhista: Soviet servicemen drove some of the inhabitants into caves, where they threw grenades at them or shot them. The exact number of those killed has not been established, but it is known that out of the 'non-transportable' people, at least 300 were killed in Melkhista.

In the 1970s, the local researcher A. S. Suleimanov published his work "Toponymy of Chechen-Ingushetia" in four parts, in Grozny from 1976 to 1985. This work included rare research into microtoponymy of Melkhista. It said that there were 14 small auls in Melkhista, the spiritual center is named as the village of Melkhista, but no such village is named in the work. Possibly, the spiritual center was aul Korotakh.

== Auls ==
Melkhista includes the following auls and former auls:

- Amiye
- Ayrishka
- Banakh
- Besta
- Best-Khavkha
- Benista
- Boziyakhi
- Duoza
- Ikal-Chu
- Ital-Chu
- Kegina
- Kharpato
- Komalkha
- Koruotta
- Melkhista
- Meshiekh
- Nokharasta
- Olakano
- Sakhana
- Tertgie
- Tsenchu-Mekhk
- Vegi-Chu
- Zhara (Meshe-khi-Zhare).

== Historical monuments and architecture ==
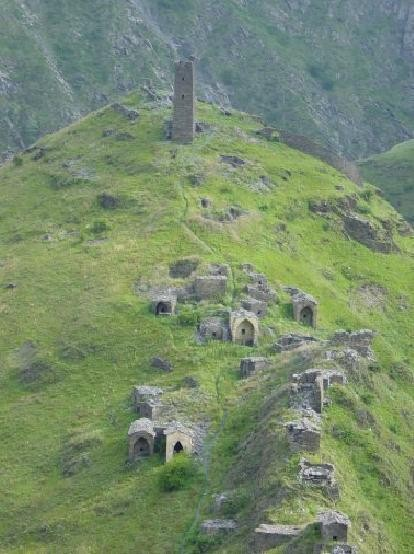
Tsoy-Peda necropolis in Melkhista

Necropolis and tower complexes

In Melkhista, one of the largest necropolises in the Caucasus – Tskhayn-Pkheda, or Tsoy-Peda – where there are 50 stone crypts. Often, it is not indicated that there was once a village of the same name nearby, which was destroyed in an uncertain period.

Buildings and traces of paganism

In the territories inhabited by medieval Nakhs, including in Melkhista, the remains of various religious buildings characteristic of the period of Nakh paganism have survived. In Melkhista, these are often pillar-like sanctuaries, possibly dedicated to the Nakh god of thunder and lightning Sele (hence the modern name of these structures) and ground crypts with open memorial chambers, sometimes with a courtyard surrounded by a stone fence. In particular, in the necropolis of the village of Tsoy-Peda, there are the remains of two sieling, which are low, made of stone on a lime mortarposts, with a square base and square niches; In the necropolis of the village of Tertgie, one kashkov survived, it is large crypts, their facades have depressions in the form of spirals, diamond and square patterns, and along the edges and above the entrance of the crypts are decorated with stone ram heads. On some towers in Melkhista, there are various pagan petroglyphs, for example in the form of a sun, cross and, the most common symbol - double spirals in various forms and stylizations (usually applied to the corner stones of towers).

Buildings and traces of Christianity

Traces of Christianity in Melkhista, or rather the accompanying attributes, can be traced in the form of certain petroglyphs on residential and religious buildings, and are also present in local toponymy. For example, on the battle tower near the Tsoy-Peda necropolis, there is an image of a cross. However, it is possible that this is not a Christian cross, but a pagan sign with the meaning of a talisman.

== Bibliography ==
- Барахоева, Н. М.; Кодзоев, Н. Д.; Хайров, Б. А. (2016). Ингушско-русский словарь терминов [Ingush-Russian dictionary of terms] (in Ingush and Russian) (2nd ed.). Нальчик: ООО «Тетраграф». pp. 1–288.
- БIархой, Нина; Коазой, Нурдин; Хайренаькъан, БайIаьла (2016). ГIалгIай-Эрсий Терминий Дошлорг (in Ingush and Russian). Магас. pp. 1–288.
- Ilyasov, Lecha Makhmudovich (2004). Khasiev, Said-Magomed (ed.). Тени вечности. Чеченцы: архитектура, история, духовные традиции [Shadows of Eternity. Chechens: architecture, history, spiritual traditions] (in Russian). Moscow: Pantori.
- Kodzoyev, N. D. (2021). Khayrova, R. R. (ed.). Русско-ингушский словарь [Russian-Ingush dictionary] (in Ingush and Russian). Rostov-on-Don: Laki Pak Typography. pp. 1–656. ISBN 978-5-906785-55-8.
- Мальсагов, З. К. (1963). Оздоева, Ф. (ed.). Грамматика ингушского языка [Grammar of the Ingush language] (in Ingush and Russian). Vol. 5 (2nd ed.). Грозный: Чечено-Ингушское Книжное Издательство. pp. 1–164.
- Oshaev, Khalid (August 1930). "Малхиста (к характеристике пережитков родового строя)" [Malkhista (to the characteristics of the remnants of the tribal system)]. The Revolution and Highlander (in Russian) (8). Rostov-on-Don: Northern Caucasus: 58–65.
- Сулейманов, А. С. (1997). "Маьлхиста (маьлхий)" [Mälkhista (Mälkhiy)]. In Котляров, В. Н.; Прокопенко, Л. И.; Сулейманова, З. А. (eds.). Топонимия Чечни [Toponymy of Chechnya] (in Russian). Нальчик: Эль-Фа. pp. 62–64.
