= Sharoy =

Rural locality in Chechnya, Russia

Sharoy Шарой
- Selo

Other transcription(s)
  - Chechen: Шара
- Interactive map of Sharoy
- Location of Sharoy Sharoy (Chechnya)
- Coordinates: 42°37′39″N 45°48′19″E
- Country: Russia
- Federal subject: Chechnya
- Administrative district: Sharoysky District
- Elevation: 1,564 m (5,131 ft)

Population
  - Estimate (2002): 203 )
- Time zone: UTC+3 (MSK)
- Postal code: 366413
- OKTMO ID: 96691421101

Sharoy (Russian: Шарой, Chechen: Шара, Şara) is a rural locality (a selo) and the administrative center of Sharoysky District, the Chechen Republic, Russia. (The selo of Khimoy serves as the administrative center of Sharoysky Municipal District). Population: 203 (2002 census);
