= Battle of Khankala (1395) =

1395 battle in the Princedom of Simsim

- Part of the Main Timurid campaign against Simsim
Date	1395
Location	Khankala gorge, Princedom of Simsim
Result	Timurid victory: Surrender of Makham; Destruction of the main Simsim army

Belligerents
Princedom of Simsim	Timurid empire

Commanders and leaders
Khour II; Makham; Other Chechen princes	Timur

Casualties and losses
Heavy	Unknown

During the Main Timurid campaign against Simsim in 1395, the main Simsim army, led by Khour II as well as other Chechen nobles clashed with the Timurids led by Timur. The battle resulted in the defeat of the former.

== Background ==
With the victory of Timur during the Battle of the Terek River against the Golden Horde in 1395, he planned on devastating the North Caucasus because of their support for the Mongols in the Tokhtamysh-Timur war. Starting West, Timur undertook a short expedition into Circassia, before sending some of his generals to complete the expedition. Meanwhile, he ravaged the land of the kings Burak Khan, Kuli and T'aus, and Pul Adi.

== Prelude ==
With the fall of the fortress Pulada, Timur returned to his headquarters in the Pjatigorye region, organizing and preparing his troops for the final campaign in Simsim. Timur announced to the population of Simsim that anyone who obeyed would be pardoned, and anyone who resisted would be executed. However, this threat of the conqueror did not have the expected result, as evidenced by the hostilities that unfolded here
Having won several clashes with the army of Simsim, Timur occupied the area surrounding the Northwest of the Terek River. While moving along the left bank of the Terek River, the Chechens conducted ambushes on his army, however he countered these ambushes by digging defensive trenches. Eventually, he reached the Sunzha River.

== Battle ==
The army of the formidable Timur decided to move into the mountains of Chechnya upstream of the Sunzha and Argun. To do this, Timur wanted to cross to the right bank of the Sunzha River, where the city of Grozny is now located. It was here, according to legend, that by order of Timur a bridge was built across the Sunzha, from which the crossing itself across the river in this place was called “Kopir-Astagh Timur”, that is, “the bridge of Timur the lame”.
The two armies clashed in the Khankala gorge, located Southwest of modern-day Grozny. A fierce battle began, however, a far more numerical superiority of the Timurids led to the dominance of the latter on the battlefield. Realizing this, Khour II retreated his forces, planning to conduct a Guerrilla campaign against the army of Timur. However, while trying to retreat, Tamerlane's army inflicted great losses on the Simsim army, almost leading to its complete destruction.

== See also ==
- Timurid invasions of Simsim
- Khour II
- Makham
- Princedom of Simsim

== Sources ==
- Хизриев, Х.А. ТИМУРА И БОРЬБА ЧЕЧЕНЦЕВ ЗА НЕЗАВИСИМОСТЬ (in Russian). Грозный.
- Ангуни, Амин (2013). Народа Нохчий (in Russian). Издательский аппарат общества Бяццара Кхиэташуо (БК).
- Хизриев, Х.А. (1980). Борьба народов Северного Кавказа с экспансией Тимура (in Russian). Грозный.
- Тесаев, 3.А. (2020). личности Чечни (XI-XXI вв.) (in Russian). Грозный: Акционерное общество Издательско-полиграфический комплекс Грозненский рабочий. pp. 1–720.
