= Gayur-khan =

King of Simsim from c. 1362 to 1395

Gayur-Khan

King of Simsim
- Reign: 1362–1396
- Born: 1329
- Died: 1396 (aged 66–67)
- Religion: Christianity

Gayur-khan, also known as Khour II or Kyr Bek, (Note: Persian: گایور خان; Chechen/Ingush: ГӀайраха, romanized: Ghayrakha; Russian: Каир-мек, romanized: Kair-mek. The name "Kyr-Bek" is found in the Zafarnama by Nizam al-Din Shami while in the much later Zafarnama by Sharaf ad-Din Ali Yazdi he's known as "Gayur Khan".) was the king of Simsir in the 14th century. He was involved in the Timurid invasion of the Caucasus and was recorded in the two Persian chronicles: Zafarnama by Nizam al-Din Shami and the Zafarnama by Sharaf ad-Din Ali Yazdi.

== Background and historical references ==
The earliest historical reference to Khour comes in the form of a biography about Timur called Zafarname from the 15th century. The biography was commissioned during the reign of Ibrahim Sultan the grandson of Timur. The Zafarname has two versions from two different Persian authors named Nizam ad-Din Shami and Sharaf ad-Din Ali Yazdi. Both biographies speak of the campaigns of Timur in the Caucasus, it is here where Simsir and its leader Gayur-Khan are first mentioned. Local Caucasian folklore such as the 19th century Ossetian poem "Alguziani" and 19th century Chechen chronicle "Migration from Naxchuvan" also mention Khour Ela. He is also mentioned in the 18th century book "Russian history" as "Kair-Mek" alongside an Ossetian prince called Altanzibek.

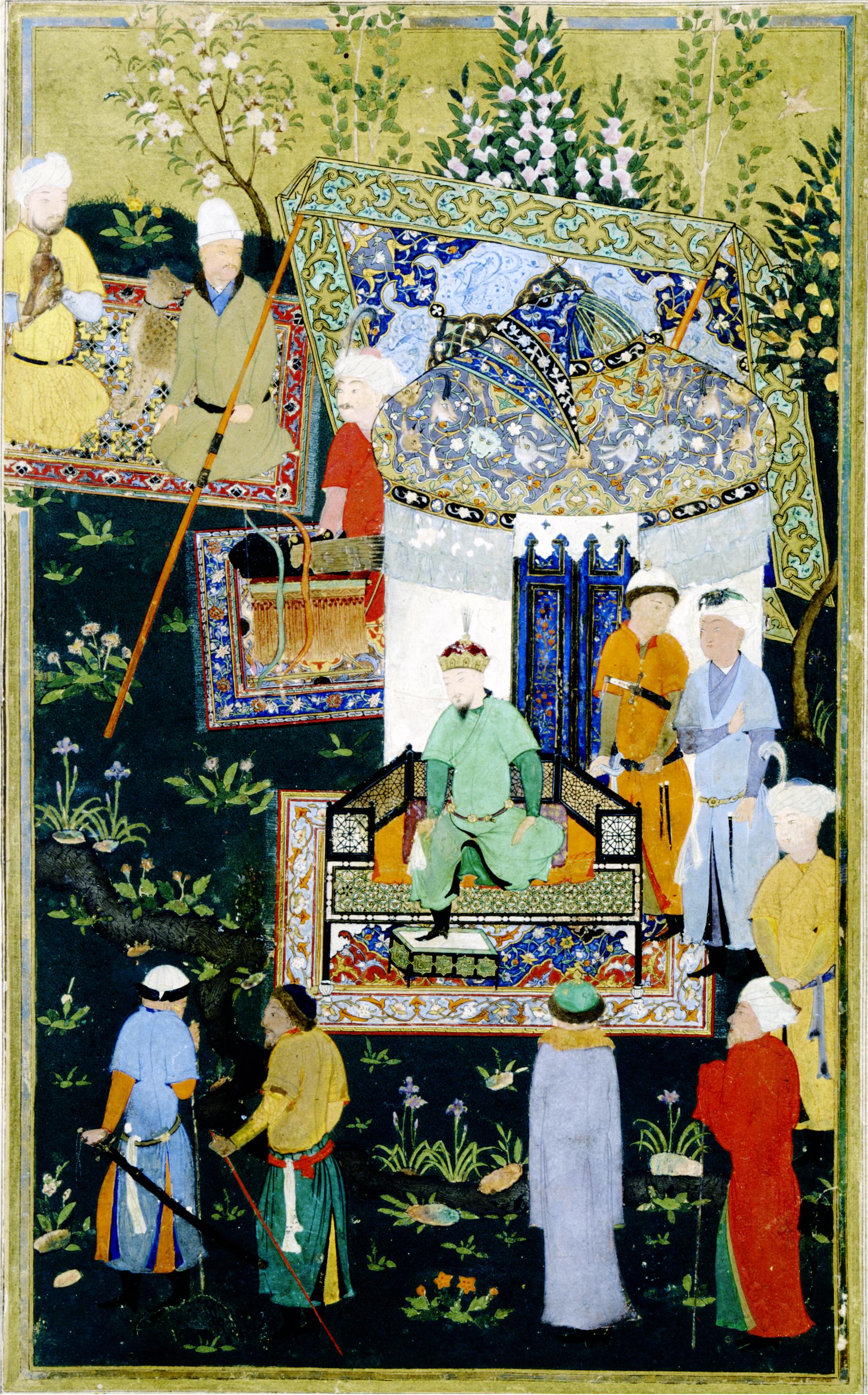
Timur in the Zafarnama

The historical sources coupled with local folk tales present Khour Ela as an important figure in the North Caucasus during the 14th century. His ancestry and genealogy were studied by the Sadoy clan historian Murtazaliev who did fieldwork in Chechnya during 1991–1999 by interviewing several Sadoy clan elders. Their genealogy of the famous folk heroes from clan Sadoy contributed a lot to the Chechen historical sciences. The father of Khour was Khasi I who was the previous king while the son of Khour was a Muslim convert and vassal of Timur named Makhama who is mentioned in the Zafarname as "Muhammad". The Chechen-Arabic manuscript "Migration from Naxchuvan" from 1820 also gives insight into the family and religion of Khour-Ela. It mentions two brothers called "Kagar" (Kahir) and "Surak-khan" who were both Christians. The manuscript that is pro-Imamate describes the reach of these two brothers. Kagar rules lands in Chir-Yurt and his brother Surak extends his rule over Avaria. The Dagestani chronicle "Tarikh Dagestan" also notes that the founder of Avar Nutsaldom is a certain Surakat that is descended from the "Urus Sultans".

== Early statehood of Simsir ==
Simsir is believed to have started off as a vassal or tributary state of the Golden Horde and played an important role in its Caucasian politics. Khour-Ela is believed to have been an ally of Khan Khidir. This is noted by the Chechen historian A. Tesaev who refers to the 18th century book "History of Russia" that relates an event during Khan Khidir's rule. The event in question was the 1360 Kostroma pogrom where a mob of Christian Russians robbed and killed several Muslim Tatars. The Tatars in return did the same in the Volga region. To quell this violence the Khan sent three Christian Caucasian ambassadors to negotiate a peace with the Russians. These three ambassadors were called Urus, Altanzibek and Kair-Mek. The last two Ambassadors are noted for their similarity in name with the Ossetian prince Altanzibek and Chechen king Khour-Ela. The use of Caucasian Christian ambassadors to Russia was not an uncommon thing to do by the Khan of the Golden Horde as it happened in a similar situation in 1327 as well. Chechen folk tales also report that Khour convened with the Mekhk-Khela (National Council) and after successfully completing the tasks given to him by the Siyr's (Sages) he was elected as the leader of the whole Chechen nation. The folktales about Khour are recorded far and wide in Chechnya so much so that he is considered as the main leader of the Chechens in the late 14th century by modern historians. It is also due to this that Khour is connected with an 18th century manuscript by Russian-Tatar general Sultan Kazi-Girey about a certain "Lamkerist" war with a certain "Mamai". The Chechen historian A. Tesaev notes that the manuscript coincides with events in the 14th century during the "Great Troubles" of the Golden Horde, when the rogue warlord Mamai fought in several wars during this period. The 18th century manuscript by Kazi-Girey goes into detail about how a force of "Lamkerist" ("Mountain Christians" in Chechen) went to a certain fortress called "Tatar-Tup" and defeated Mamai and took the fortress. Later it is described how the same army goes and defeats Nogay and Oirat garrisons in the area near the Kuma river. The folktale gives us a date of the event as 1361–1362. This date is also accepted by the Russian historian V. Kuznetsov who notes that the attack showed the weakening of the Golden Horde in the North Caucasus. It is therefore the date 1362 that is considered important by A. Tesaev for the Simsir kingdom as archaeological research shows that Golden Horde minted coins cease to exist on the territory of Chechnya after 1362 (after Khan Khidir's reign) and only resurfaced during the reign of Khan Tokhtamysh (an ally of Khour). Another important factor to note was the Georgian Kingdom which supported Khour in his campaigns according to folklore and Georgian reports from the reign of George V the Brilliant.

== Timurid invasion and fate of Khour ==
The 18th century document from Kazi-Girey also mentions that the ancestors of Chechens were the main allies (in the vanguard) of the Tokhtamysh army against the Timurid invasions of the Caucasus. It was due to this fact that Timur decided to invade Simsir with such ferocity after the Battle of the Terek River in 1395. The invasion of Simsir is described in the Zafarname by both Nizam ad-Din Shami and Sharaf ad-Din Ali Yazdi. In that invasion Khour loses his power and Timur grants the title of vassalage to his son Muhammad (Makhama). Timur's campaign in Simsir went even further into the mountains where Timur himself is described to have climbed the mountains and defeated the highlanders of Simsir. The fate of Khour and his son is unknown in historical references but folk tales speak of an assassination of Makhama. They also mention how Khour kept a resistance against vassals of Timur and eventually fought in another invasion of Timur where he was treacherously murdered during negotiations. The Ossetian poem "Alguziani" gives a different version of the fate of Khour, the poem refers to Khour as "Kairkhan the Chechen" who was a powerful king that fought against the prince Alguz for the power of Ossetia. In the poem Alguz is victorious in a battle and defeats Khour. The poem is believed to have been regarded as a valuable source for North Caucasian folk tales.

== Bibliography ==
- Khizriev, Kh. A. (1992). Iriskhanov, I. A. (ed.). Кавказцы против Тимура (Борьба народов Северного Кавказа против экспансии Тимура) [Caucasians against Timur (The struggle of the peoples of the North Caucasus against the expansion of Timur)] (in Russian). Grozny: Kniga. pp. 1–168. ISBN 5-7666-0320-7.
- Rtveladze, E. V. (1976). "О походе Тимура на Северный Кавказ" [About Timur's campaign in the North Caucasus]. In Vinogradov, V. B. (ed.). Археолого-этнографический сборник: вып. 4 [Archaeological and ethnographic collection: no. 4] (in Russian). Grozny. pp. 103–128.
- Shnirelman, V. A. (2006). Kalinin, I. (ed.). Быть Аланами: Интеллектуалы и политика на Северном Кавказе в XX веке [To be Alans: Intellectuals and Politics in the North Caucasus in the 20th Century] (in Russian). Moskva: Novoe Literaturnoe Obozrenie. pp. 1–348. ISBN 5-86793-406-3. ISSN 1813-6583.
