= Battle of Ushkudzhe =

1395 battle

- Part of Timur's campaign in Dagestan
Date	Winter of 1395
Location	Ushkudzhe, Dagestan
Result	Timurid victory
Territorial changes	Annexation of Aukh and the Gazikumukh Shamkhalate; Annexation of other regions in Dagestan

Belligerents
Aukh; Gazikumukh Shamkhalate; Ushkudzha	Timurid Empire

Commanders and leaders
Maida; Shovkhal I †	Timur

Strength
3,000	5,000–10,000

Casualties and losses
Most of the army Remaining captured	Moderate

The Battle of Ushkudzhe was the final confrontation between Aukh and the Gazikumukh Shamkhalate with the Timurid Empire. Although fierce fighting, the Aukhs, Gazikumukhs and Akusha-dargin failed to defeat the numerical superior conqueror Timur, who, in retribution for the formers resistance, conducted a campaign in both states, resulting in the end of the Aukh and Gazikumukh struggle against the conqueror.

== History ==
Timur's campaign of Dagestan began with the crossing of the Terek River in Winter of 1395. He first invaded Tarki, separated from the main convoy, then moved to the settlement Ushkudzhe.

From there, Timur instructed the commanders of his army where to pass. Although the people of this area were not Muslims and Maida and Shovkhal I waged Jihad several times before, they, together with an army numbering 3,000, went to the natives out. Tamerlane, at the head of his horsemen, went to meet them, followed by a fierce battle between the two sides. The army of the Aukhs and Gazikumukhs proved ineffective against the numerically superior Timurids, who soon after destroyed most of the army, capturing the rest. Shovkhal I was also killed in battle, and his head was later brought to Timur. He, with the head of the commander, approached the war captives and asked them:

"Before, you, adherents of Islam, always fought with the infidels; what has become now, that you, stepping back from this, went to their aid?"

The captives admitted their guilt and vowed not to attack Timur again, for which they received large gifts and were released under the condition that they keep "Fighting the enemies of the faith". Soon after, the rulers, nobles and elders of both Aukh and the Gazikumukh Shamkhalate appeared to Timur, who surrendered and recognized Timur's rule, for which they also received gifts, ending the Aukh and Gazikumukh resistance against Timur.

Following their surrender, Timur ravaged central Dagestan, destroying the fortresses Nerges, (Note: Not far from modern-day Arkas, Republic of Dagestan) Mika, Balu and Derkelu. He then hunted down those who managed to flee.

== See also ==
- Shovkhal I
- Timurid invasions of Simsim

== Sources ==
- Хизриев, Х.А. (1980). Борьба народов Северного Кавказа с экспансией Тимура (in Russian). Грозный.
- Ангуни, Амин (2013). Государственность Народа Нохчий (in Russian). Издательский аппарат общества Бяццара Кхиэташуо (БК).
