= Timurid invasion of Simsim =

14th century invasion by Timurid Empire

- Part of Tokhtamysh–Timur war
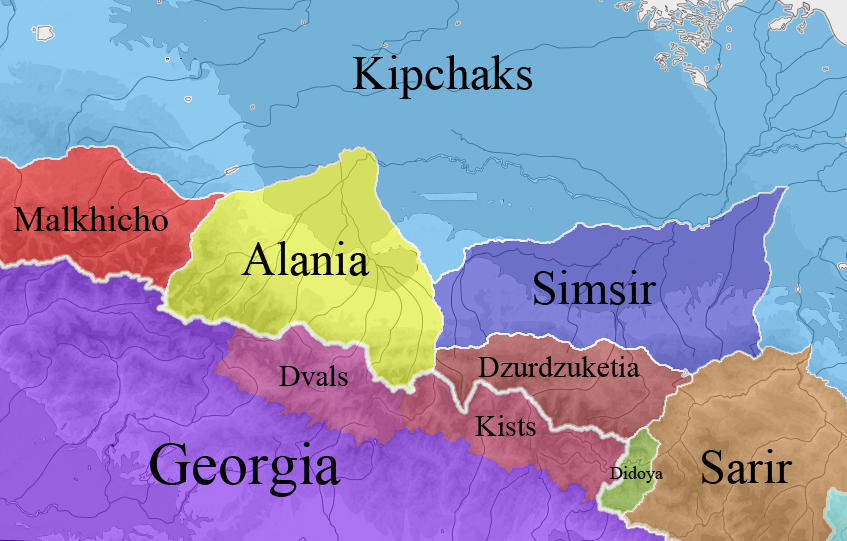
- Simsim and its neighbors c. 1124
Date	c. 1395–1396
Location	Northeast Caucasus (Note: Simsim has been localized in Ichkeria (Chechnya), Checheno-Ingushetia and sometimes, in both Ichkeria and Kumyk Plain. See Simsir § Localization.)
Result	Timurid victory

Belligerents
Simsim	Timurid Empire

Commanders and leaders
Gayur Khan (executed)	Timur; Muhammad (Note: Son of Gayur Khan; defected to the side of Timur during the Timurid invasion. See § Invasion.)

The Timurid invasion of Simsim happened in the 14th century when the Timurid Empire invaded Simsim, an ally of the Golden Horde. As a result, Simsim was devastated which led to the collapse of the state; a large part of the population was killed and many shrines and temples were destroyed.

== Background ==
In 14 April 1395, the forces of the Golden Horde under Tokhtamysh and the Timurid Empire under Timur met on the opposite sides of the Terek River in the Battle of the Terek River. Both armies counted around 300,000 men. The native North Caucasians participated on the side of Tokhtamysh. The Timurids won over the Golden Horde and Tokhtamysh's army was dispersed. Pursuing Tokhtamysh, Timur annihilated and robbed as he passed through Bulgaria, Kievan Rus' and Crimea. Having returned to North Caucasus, he carried out a massacre of the local people.

== Invasion ==
After the destruction of the Kapchigai Fortress, Timur returned to the Pyatigorsk, his headquarters. There he let his army rest and planned another invasion of the North Caucasus, this time, of Simsim. According to Abd al-Razzaq Samarqandi, Timur declared to the population of Simsim that "anyone who obeyed would be pardoned, and anyone who resisted would be executed". However, this threat was ignored by the population of Simsim, after which Timur invaded.

When Timur arrived in Simsim, the son of Gayur Khan, Muhammad, defected to Timur together with his ilem ('region and subjects') and became Timur's vassal. The lowland Muslim Turkic inhabitants of Simsim gave little to no resistance to the Timurids and submitted easily.

The invasion took on a large scale as attested by the fact that Timur's court historians did not consider it necessary to describe the fate of Gayur Khan, but focused all their attention on Timur's actions in the mountainous part of Simsim.

The Timurids invaded mountainous Simsim not only because the inhabitants retreated to there, but also because of the pagan beliefs of the inhabitants. The Timurids divided into separate units and moved through the area from west to east, capturing and destroying fortresses and castles along the way, located mainly in the modern day Dzheyrakhsky and Galashkinsky Districts of Ingushetia and Galanchozhsky, Shatoysky and the Itum-Kalinsky Districts of Chechnya. After fighting in the Argun Gorge, the Timurids turned to the northeast, delving into the forest zone of the current Sharoysky, Vedensky and Nozhay-Yurtovsky Districts up to the Andian Ridge. By order of Timur, the inhabitants of mountainous Simsim were tied and thrown off cliffs while their places of worship were ruined and destroyed.

During the fighting in Simsim, the Timurids took control of many parts of Simsim. Timur desired so much to deal with the rebellious mountain people that he even ordered his army to climb into places from which there was no descent either on horseback or on foot. Focusing on the strength of resistance of the inhabitants of Simsim and the ferocity of military operations in the most difficult mountain conditions, Timur's court historians noted that Timur himself "was subjected to these horrors and dangers".

As a result of the Timurid invasion, the Simsim state dissolved.

== Bibliography ==
=== Russian sources ===
- Rtveladze, Edvard (1976). "О походе Тимура на Северный Кавказ" [About Timur's campaign in the North Caucasus]. In Vinogradov, Vitaly (ed.). Археолого-этнографический сборник: вып. 4 [Archaeological and ethnographic collection: no. 4] (in Russian). Grozny. pp. 103–128.
- Khizriev, Kh. A. (1992). Iriskhanov, I. A. (ed.). Кавказцы против Тимура (Борьба народов Северного Кавказа против экспансии Тимура) [Caucasians against Timur (The struggle of the peoples of the North Caucasus against the expansion of Timur)] (in Russian). Grozny: Kniga. pp. 1–168. ISBN 5-7666-0320-7.
- Khizriev, Kh. A. (2019). "Нашествие Тимура и борьба чеченцев за независимость" [The invasion of Timur and the struggle of the Chechens for independence] (in Russian). Grozny: AN ChR.
- Velikaya, V. N.; Vinogradov, V. B.; Khasbulatov, A. I.; Chakhkiev, Yu. D. (1990). Aliroev, I. Yu. (ed.). Очерки этнографии чеченцев и ингушей (in Russian). Grozny: Chech.-Ing. gos. un-t. pp. 1–93.
