= Battle of Khankala =

Battle of Khankala may refer to:

- Battle of Khankala (1222), successful Mongol raid into the North Caucasus
- Battle of Khankala (1395), failed Last stand of the Chechens against the army of Timur on the plain
- Battle of Khankala (1735), failed Crimean invasion of Chechnya
- Battle of Khankala (1807), capture of the Khankala fortification by Russian forces
- Battle of Khankala (1994), failed Chechen separatist counterattack at Khankala
