= Zafarnama (Shami biography) =

Biography of Timur by Nizam ad-Din Shami

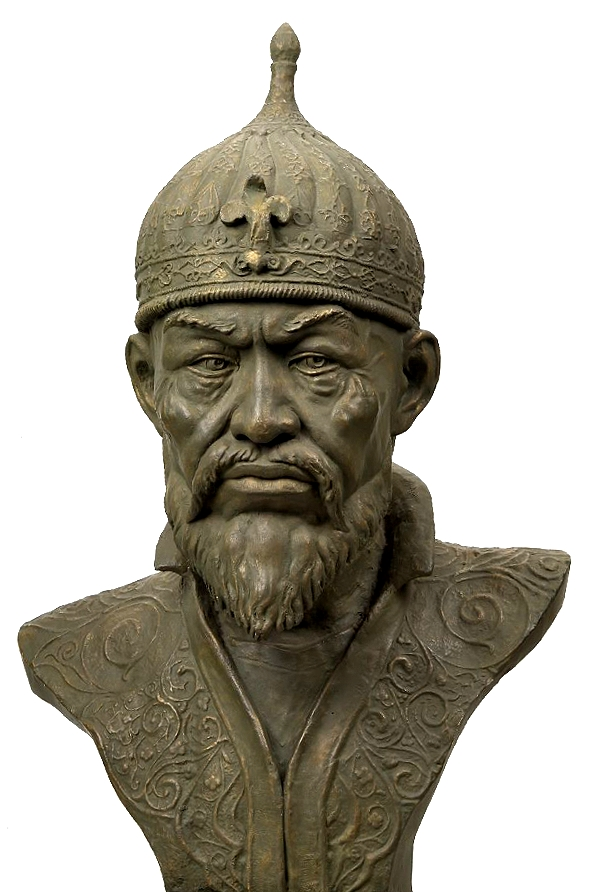
Timur reconstruction by Mikhail Gerasimov

The Zafarnama (Persian: ظفرنامه, lit. ''Book of Victory') is a biography of Timur written by the historian Nizam al-Din Shami. It served as the basis for a later and better-known Zafarnama by Sharaf ad-Din Ali Yazdi.

One translation by Felix Tauer was published in Prague in 1937.
