= 1395 =

1395 in various calendars
- Gregorian calendar: 1395; MCCCXCV
- Ab urbe condita: 2148
- Armenian calendar: 844; ԹՎ ՊԽԴ
- Assyrian calendar: 6145
- Balinese saka calendar: 1316–1317
- Bengali calendar: 801–802
- Berber calendar: 2345
- English Regnal year: 18 Ric. 2 – 19 Ric. 2
- Buddhist calendar: 1939
- Burmese calendar: 757
- Byzantine calendar: 6903–6904
- Chinese calendar: 甲戌年 (Wood Dog); 4092 or 3885 — to — 乙亥年 (Wood Pig); 4093 or 3886
- Coptic calendar: 1111–1112
- Discordian calendar: 2561
- Ethiopian calendar: 1387–1388
- Hebrew calendar: 5155–5156
- Hindu calendars
- Vikram Samvat: 1451–1452
- Shaka Samvat: 1316–1317
- Kali Yuga: 4495–4496
- Holocene calendar: 11395
- Igbo calendar: 395–396
- Iranian calendar: 773–774
- Islamic calendar: 797–798
- Japanese calendar: Ōei 2 (応永２年)
- Javanese calendar: 1309–1310
- Julian calendar: 1395; MCCCXCV
- Korean calendar: 3728
- Minguo calendar: 517 before ROC 民前517年
- Nanakshahi calendar: −73
- Thai solar calendar: 1937–1938
- Tibetan calendar: ཤིང་ཕོ་ཁྱི་ལོ་ (male Wood-Dog); 1521 or 1140 or 368 — to — ཤིང་མོ་ཕག་ལོ་ (female Wood-Boar); 1522 or 1141 or 369

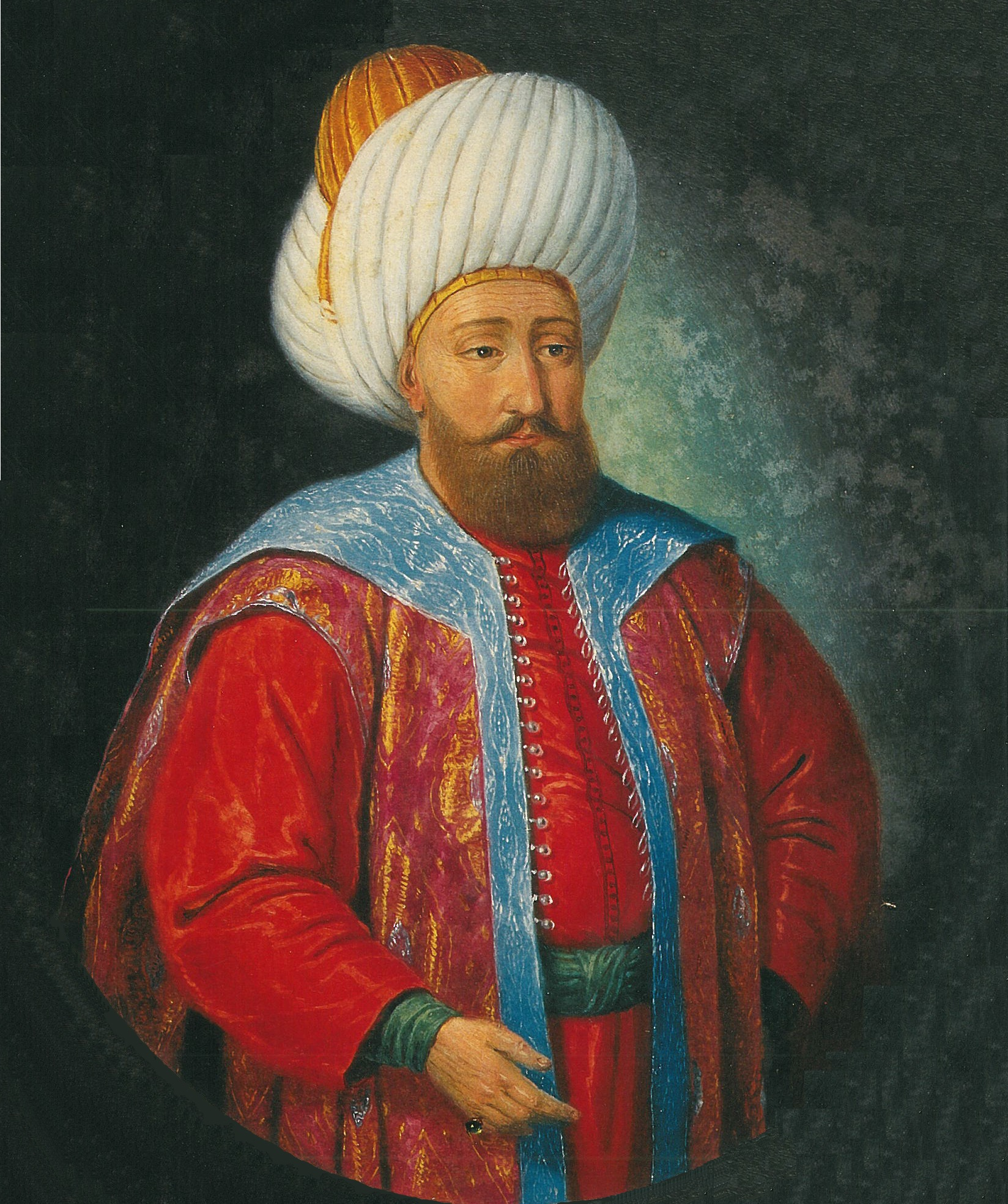
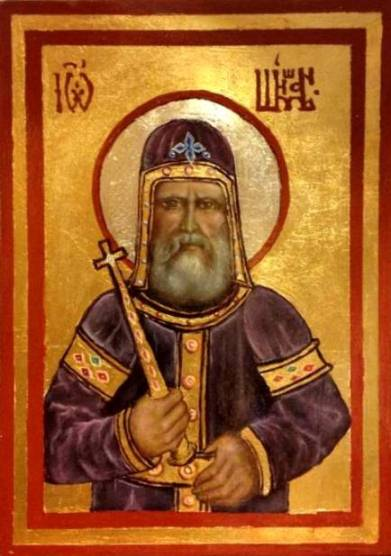
June 3: Ottoman Sultan Bayezid has Bulgarian Emperor Ivan Shishman beheaded.
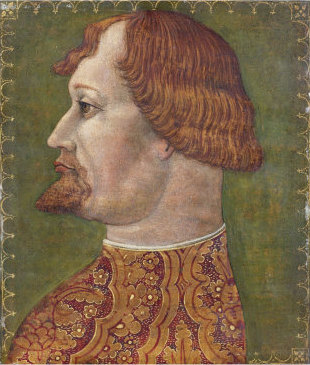
May 1: Gian Galeazzo Visconti purchases the Duchy of Milan.

Year 1395 (MCCCXCV) was a common year starting on Friday (link will display full calendar) of the Julian calendar, the 1395th year of the Common Era (CE) and Anno Domini (AD) designations, the 395th year of the 2nd millennium, the 95th year of the 14th century, and the 6th year of the 1390s decade.

== Events ==
=== January–March ===
- January 10 – Smil Flaška of Pardubice, the Supreme Provincial Scribe of the Kingdom of Bohemia, joins the League of Lords (Panská jednota), a group of nobles opposed to the rule of King Wenceslaus IV of Bohemia.
- January 27 – The 22nd English Parliament of King Richard II assembles after being summoned on November 20. John Bussy is elected as Speaker of the House of Commons.
- February 12 – At the Battle of Ghindăoani, the army led by King Sigismund of Hungary and Croatia is ambushed by Prince Stephen I of Moldavia, on its way back after conquering Neamț Citadel, and the Hungarians must retreat empty handed.
- February 15 – The English Parliament adjourns after a 19-day session.
- March 18 – After Donato Acciaioli, Duke of Athens, rewards Captain Andrea Bembo for defending Athens against an Ottoman attack, the Senate of the Republic of Venice votes to annex the Duchy of Athens.

=== April–June ===
- April 14 – Tokhtamysh–Timur war: At the Battle of the Terek River, the Mongol conqueror Timur defeats Tokhtamysh of the Golden Horde at the Volga. The Golden Horde capital city, Sarai, is razed to the ground, and Timur installs a puppet ruler, Quyurchuq, on the Golden Horde throne. Tokhtamysh escapes to Lithuania.
- May 1 – The Duchy of Milan is created, after Lord Gian Galeazzo Visconti of Milan buys the title of Duke from Wenceslaus, King of the Romans.
- May 17
  - Battle of Rovine: Wallachia resists an invasion by the Ottomans and their Serb and Bulgarian vassals. But afterward, Mircea the Elder of Wallachia has to start fighting a civil war against a rival to the throne, Vlad I Uzurpatorul.
  - Mary of Hungary dies, ending of the rule of Hungary by the Capet-Anjou family. Her co-reigning estranged husband, King Sigismund, becomes sole ruler of Hungary.
- June 3 – Sultan Bayezid I of the Ottoman Empire has the former Bulgarian Emperor Ivan Shishman beheaded after Shishman is accused of collaborating with the Principality of Wallachia during the 1394 Battle of Karanovasa.
- June 13 – Prince Albert of Austria marries his first cousin, once-removed, Joanna Sophia of Bavaria in Vienna ending a feud between her father, Albert, Duke of Bavaria and his father, Albert III of Austria.

=== July–September ===
- July 8 – At a gathering of French cardinals at the Palais des Papes in Avignon, the assembled clerics demand the resignation of the antipope Benedict XIII (Pedro Martinez de Luna), who nine months earlier had been elected as the alternative to the Roman Pope Boniface IX. The only dissenting voice is Cardinal Martín de Zalba, but Benedict refuses to step down.
- July 28 (7 Shawwal 797 AH) – Ali ibn Ajlan, the Emir of Mecca is killed and is succeeded by his brother Muhammad ibn Ajlan.
- August 6 – Philip the Bold, Duke of Burgundy, issues an ordinance prohibiting the cultivation of the Gamay grape on any lands under his jurisdiction, in favor of the increased production of pinot noir wine.
- August 25 – The oldest continuously operating fire department in Europe is established in Lisbon (Portugal) as the Serviço de incendios de Lisboa by royal decree.
- August 29 – Albert IV succeeds his father, Albert III, as Duke of Austria.
- September 5 –
  - The Kingdom of Nepal comes under the joint rule of brothers Jayadharma, Jayajyotir and Jayakiti Malla upon the death of their father, King Jayasthiti.
  - Gian Galeazzo Visconti is crowned as the first Duke of Milan.
- September 8 – The death of King Stjepan Dabiša leads to the election of his wife Jelena Gruba as Queen of Bosnia. However, most of the Bosnian land is soon appropriated by King Sigismund of Hungary.
- Late September or early October (9th month of Korean calendar year 3728) – The Gwanghwamun Gate and the Jogyesa Temple are built in modern-day Seoul in .

=== October–December ===
- October 8 – The University of Óbuda, the second in Hungary and the first in the capital, Budapest, is given a deed of foundation by Pope Boniface IX after the requests of King Sigismund of Hungary.
- November 22 – The embalmed body of Robert de Vere, 9th Earl of Oxford, a friend and advisor of King Richard II, is buried in England, on the third anniversary of his death in France, and following King Richard's determination to provide proper honors for his funeral.
- December 14 – By agreement with the Ottoman Turks, Radič Crnojević, Lord of Zeta and Budva and his brother Dobrivoje Crnojević occupy the region of Grbalj in modern-day Montenegro.
- December 19 – The Principality of Monaco comes under the control of the Republic of Genoa, administered by the Doge Antoniotto I Adorno. Lord Jean I of the House of Grimaldi steps aside during the Genoan invasion.

=== Date unknown ===
- Ramaracha succeeds his father Ramesuan as ruler of the Ayutthaya Kingdom in modern-day southern Thailand.
- The Theotokos of Vladimir icon is moved to Moscow.

== Births ==
- January 11 – Michele of Valois, French princess and Duchess Consort of Burgundy (d. 1422)
- March 18 – John Holland, 2nd Duke of Exeter, English military leader (d. 1447)
- September 7 – Reginald West, 6th Baron De La Warr, English politician (d. 1427)
- date unknown
  - Fra Angelico, Italian painter (d. 1455)
  - Niccolò Da Conti, Italian merchant and explorer (d. 1469)
  - George of Trebizond, Greek philosopher and scholar (d. 1484)
  - Jacques Cœur, French merchant (d. 1456)

== Deaths ==
- March 13 – John Barbour, Scottish poet
- May 17
  - Prince Marko, Serbian leader
  - Mary, Queen of Hungary, co-ruler
- June 3 – Ivan Shishman of Bulgaria, tsar (b. c.1350)
- August 29 – Duke Albert III of Austria (b. 1349)
- December 25 – Elisabeth, Countess of Neuchâtel, Swiss ruler
- date unknown
  - Acamapichtli, 1st tlatoani (monarch) of Tenochtitlan (modern Mexico City), 1375-1395 (b. c. 1355)
  - Margaret the Barefooted, Italian saint (b. 1325)
