= Zafarnama (Yazdi biography) =

Book of victories, one of the best-known sources of Timur's life

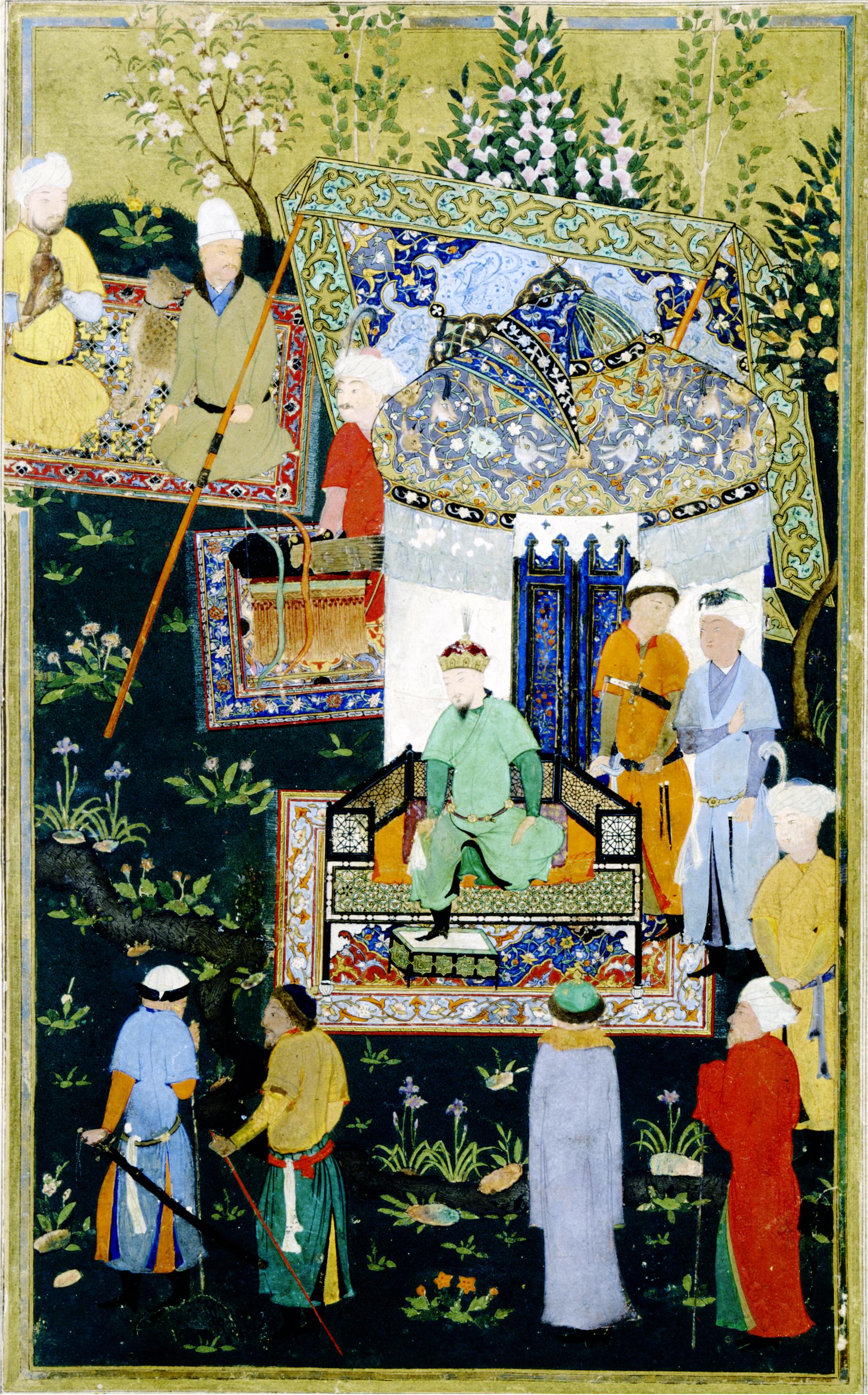
Timur granting audience on the occasion of his accession, from the Garrett Zafarnama

The Zafarnama (Persian: ظفرنامه, lit. 'Book of Victories') is a panegyric book written by Sharaf al-Din Ali Yazdi approximately two decades after the death of its main subject, Timur, the Turco-Mongol conqueror. It was commissioned by Ibrahim Sultan, Timur's grandson between 1424–28, and remains one of the best-known sources of Timur's life. The text was written using the notes taken by royal scribes and secretaries of Timur, suggesting that the history of the book was based on a careful and desired selection of facts.

Most of the poetry and texts in the beginning of Islamic Iran were panegyric, written at the demand of political and religious leaders as part of their attempt to establish their own legacy. In his lifetime, Timur wished that his deeds would be commemorated through clear and simple language. However, the Zafarnama has a decent amount of hyperbolic language and panegyric sentiment, revealing that the current literary tastes of the next generation of writers prevailed over Timur's wishes. The Zafarnama was often copied and illustrated in Persia before making its way to being translated into Chagatai under the Uzbeks, and into Ottoman Turkish during the 16th century. More recently, the Zafarnama was translated into French in 1722 by François Pétis de la Croix and into English the following year.

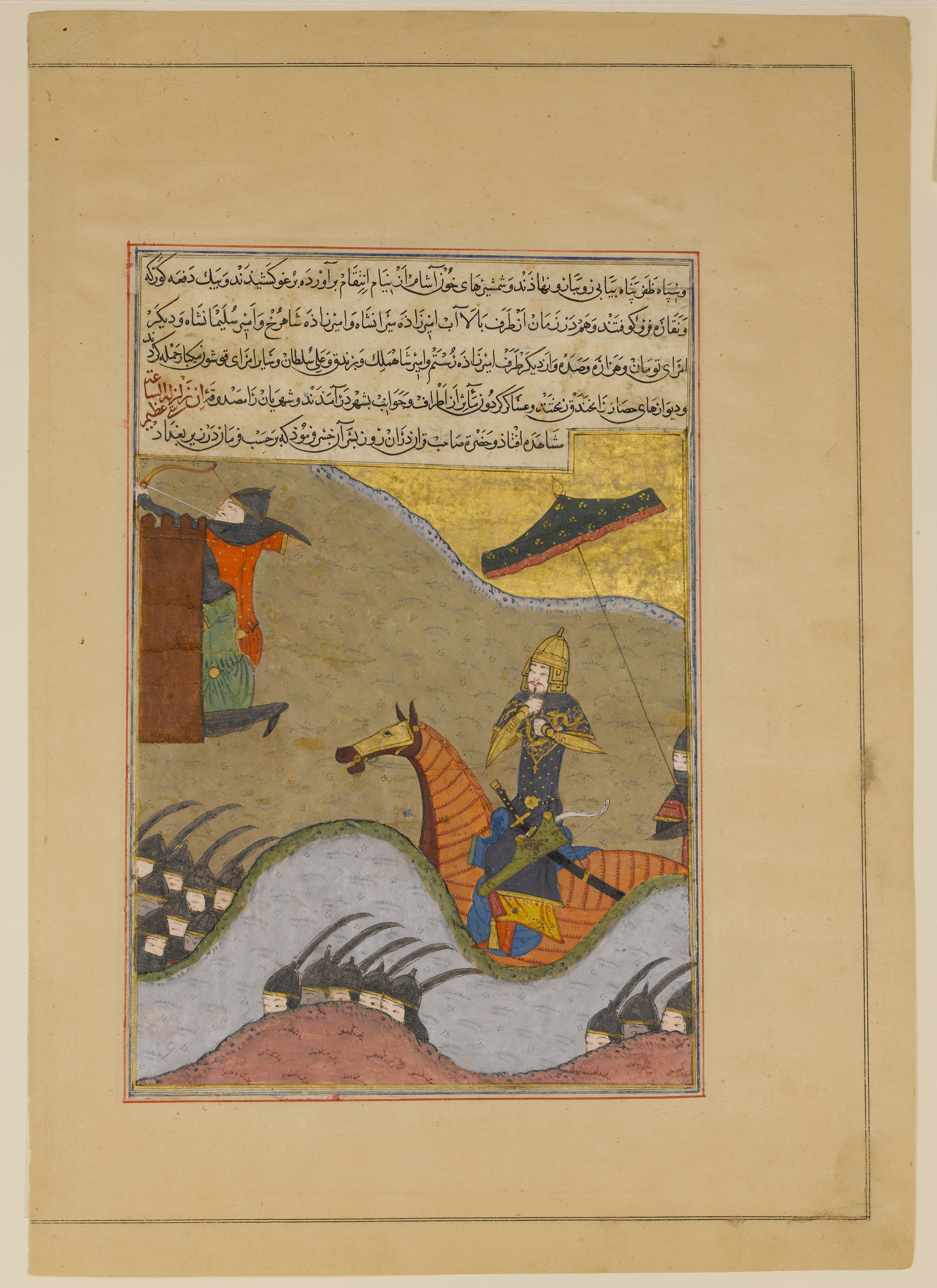
"Conquest of Baghdad by Timur", from Ibrahim Sultan's copy, 1435–1436

The Zafarnama of Yazdi is one of several fifteenth-century texts that highlights Timur's leadership and military accomplishments. Sharaf al-Din Ali Yazdi relied on these previous texts about Timur's career as a conqueror to influence his text of the Zafarnama. One of his main influences was a biography written by Nizam al-Din Shami in 1404. An example of proof of this statement is the use of Ghiyas al-Din Ali's story detailing Timur’s experience in India (the Ruz-Name-ye Ghazavat-e Hindustan) that is present in both versions of the Zafarnama that are decades apart. In 1410, one of Timur's sons, Shah Rukh, demanded an updated version of his father's history. By then, the original Zafarnama's author, Nizam al-Din Shami, had died so another scribe, Taj al-Salmani, finished the manuscript and put Timur's last few years onto paper. These textual precedents were important to the creation of the Zafarnama of the Timurid Sultan Husayn Bayqara, as they dictated the content of the text in the manuscript.

== Author ==
Sharaf al-Din Ali Yazdi, also known by his pen name Sharaf, was a 15th-century scholar who authored several works in the arts and sciences, including mathematics, astronomy, enigma, literature such as poetry, and history, the Zafarnama being his most famous (539). He was born in the affluent city of Yazd, Iran in the 1370s. He devoted much of his life to scholarship, furthering his education in Syria and Egypt until Timur’s death in 1405 (1,19). Sharaf al-Din rebelled against ruler Shah Rukh in 1446–47 when the government was vulnerable, but was later commissioned to different cities for his acumen. The later years of his life were spent in Taft, where he eventually died in 1454 (Monfared 539).

Yazdi was directed to write a biography of Timur in 1421 known as the Zafarnama, completing it four years later in 1425. Timur’s grandson Sultan Abu al-Fath Ibrahim Mirza was patron during the completion of his father’s biography (Monfared 539).

== Manuscripts ==
Several illustrated manuscript versions of the Zafarnama exist; however, out of the versions written in the fifteenth century, only three illustrated copies survive, the Zafarnama of Ibrahim Sultan, the Garrett Zafarnama, and the Turk ve Islam Eserleri Müzesi Zafarnama. The variety of versions of the Zafarnama can be attributed to the wide variety of patrons who commissioned the production of this manuscript. Each patron had different personal tastes and goals for their version of the Zafarnama, which influenced the choices of illustrations and design executed by the artists of their choosing.

The Garrett Zafarnama (or Baltimore Zafarnama or Zafarnama of Sultan Husayn Mirza) is an early manuscript of the Zafarnama (Book of Victories) by Sharaf al-Din Ali Yazdi now in the Johns Hopkins University Library in Baltimore, Maryland, USA. The manuscript has twelve Persian miniatures, in six double-page spreads, and was made around 1467–8, possibly in Herat. The colophon states that the manuscript was the work of "the most humble Shir Ali," who was a popular scribe in his day. It is believed that the six illustrations were painted by the renowned artist, Kamāl ud-Dīn Behzād.

A version was produced in the workshop of the Mughal Emperor Akbar in the 1590s.

=== 1436 edition (Ibrahim Sultan's copy) ===
This is the original edition, ordered by Ibrahim Sultan, Timur's grandson, and completed in 1436.

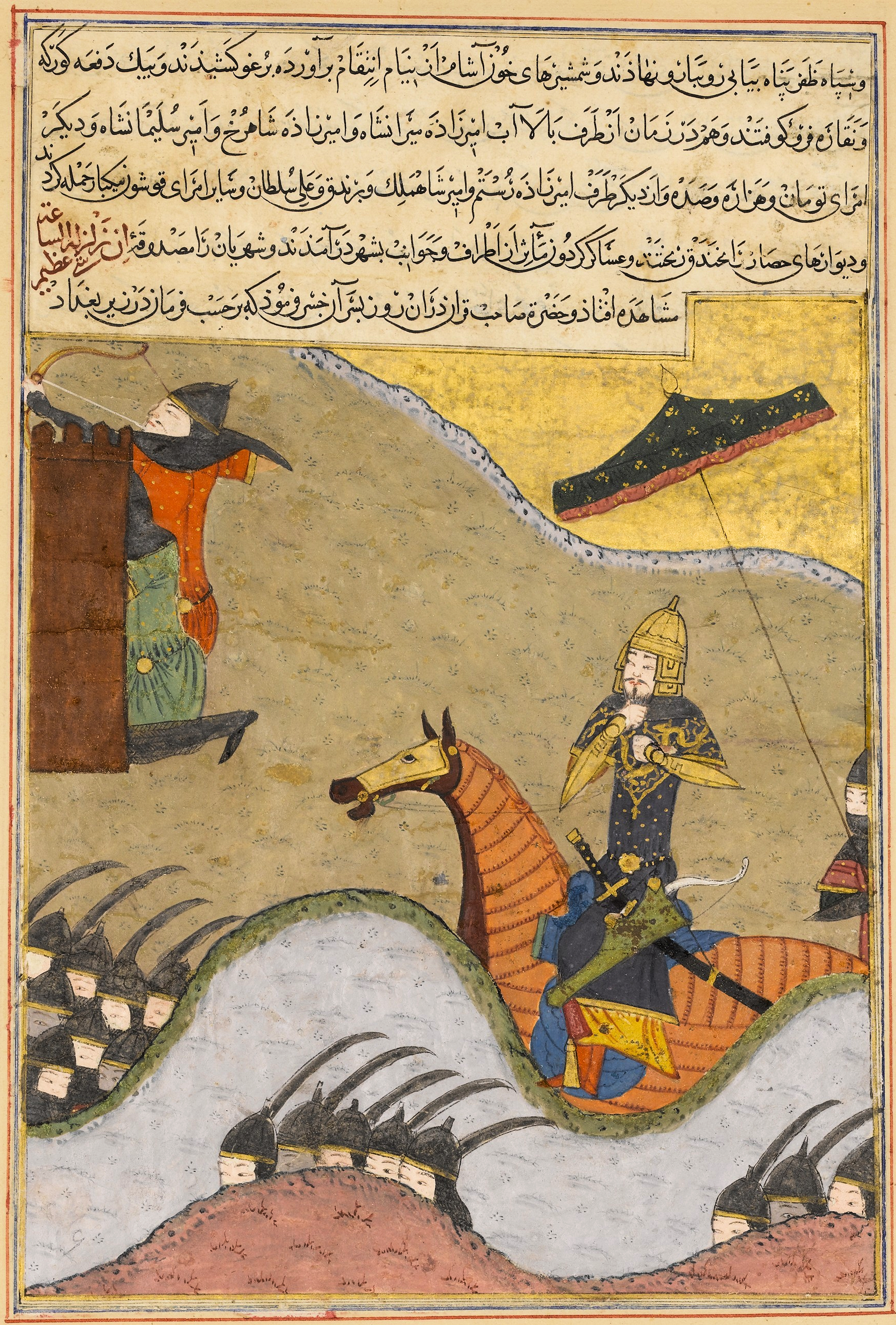
Conquest of Baghdad, Shiraz, 1435–1436, Ibrahim Sultan's copy

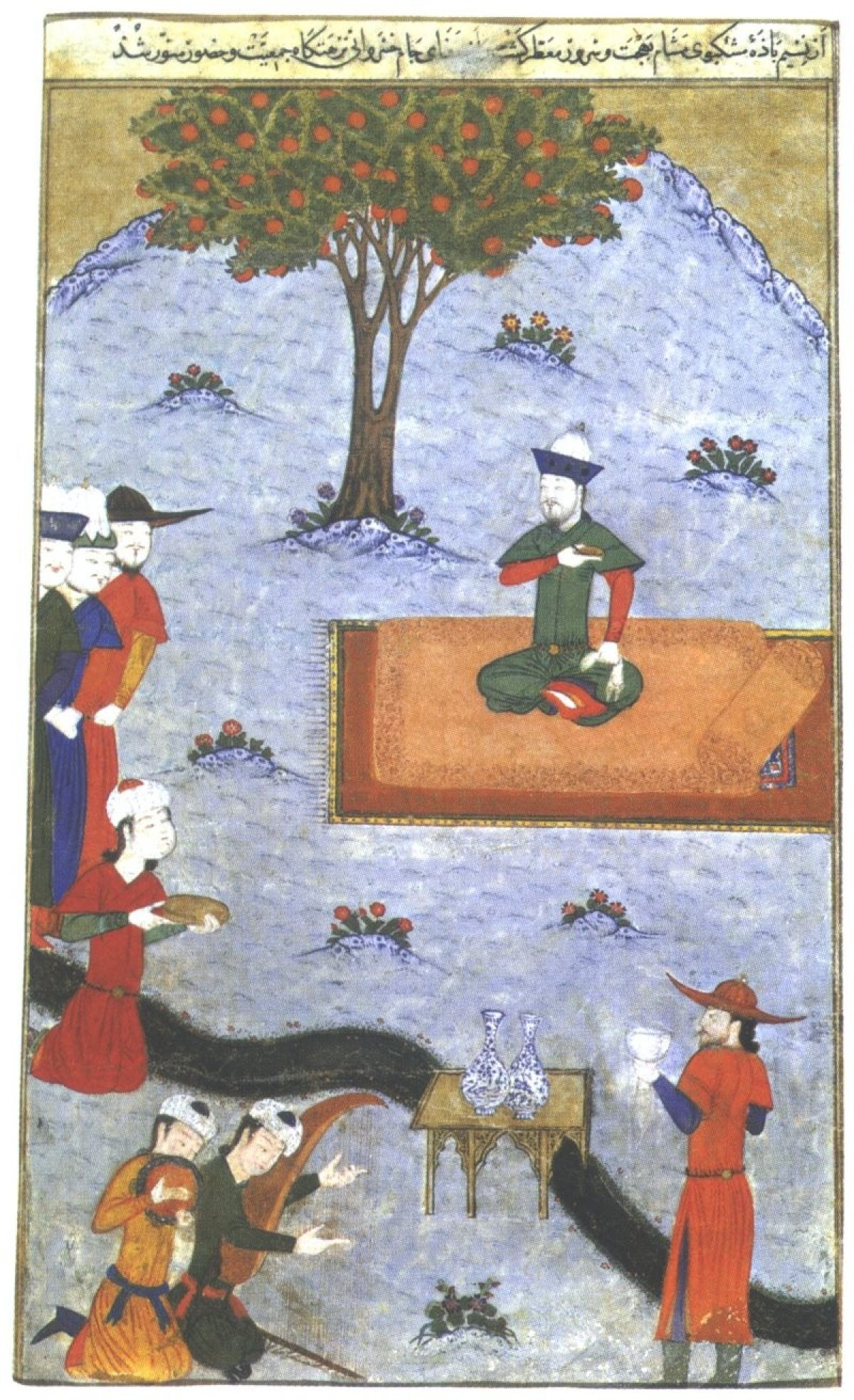
Timur's celebration of the conquest of Delhi in 1396, 1436 copy of the Zafarnama.

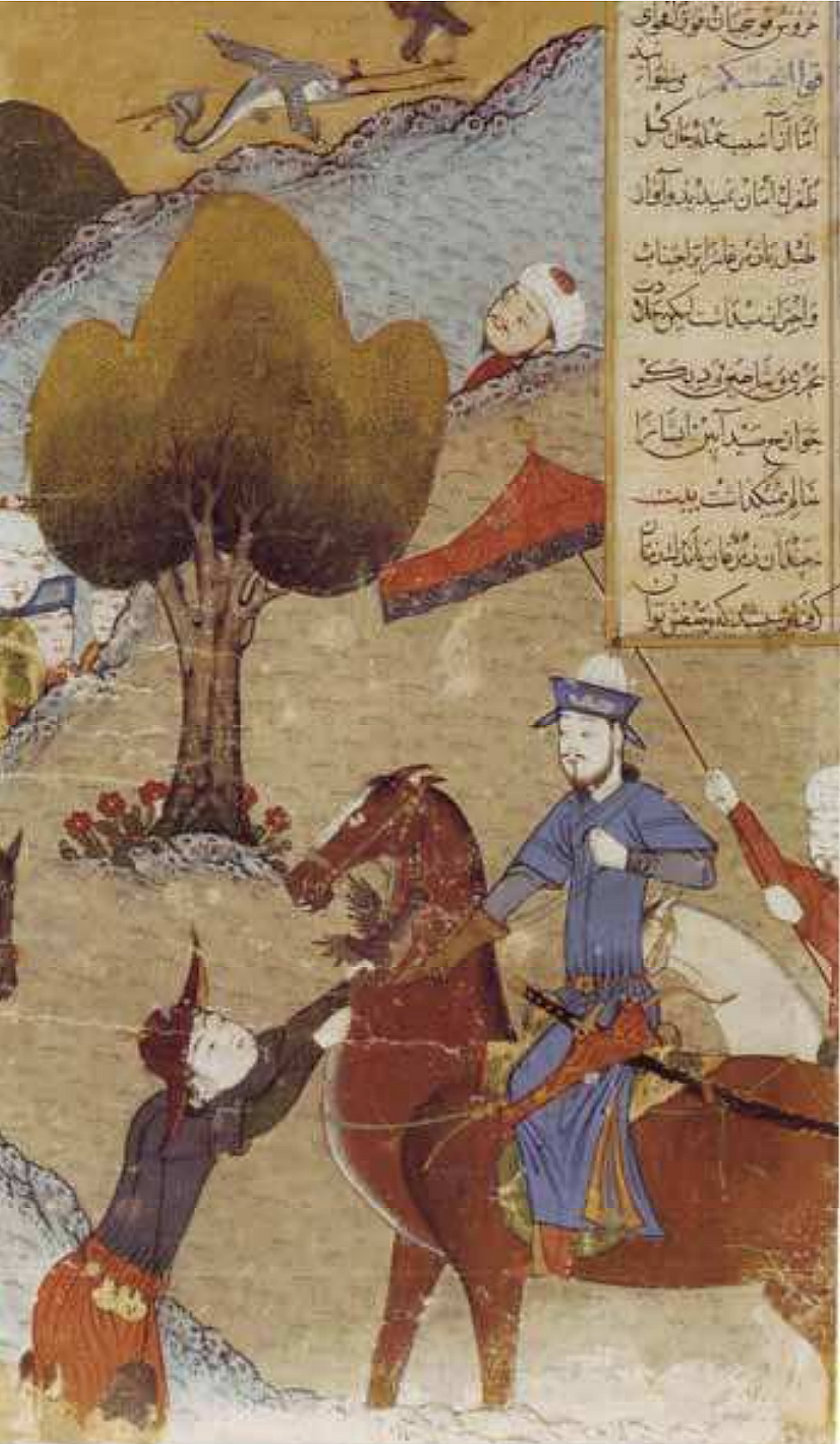
Timur hunting, page from the Zafarnama of Sharaf al-Din ‘Ali, Yazdi. Shiraz, AH 839, 1436 CE

=== 1467 edition (Garrett Zafarnama) ===
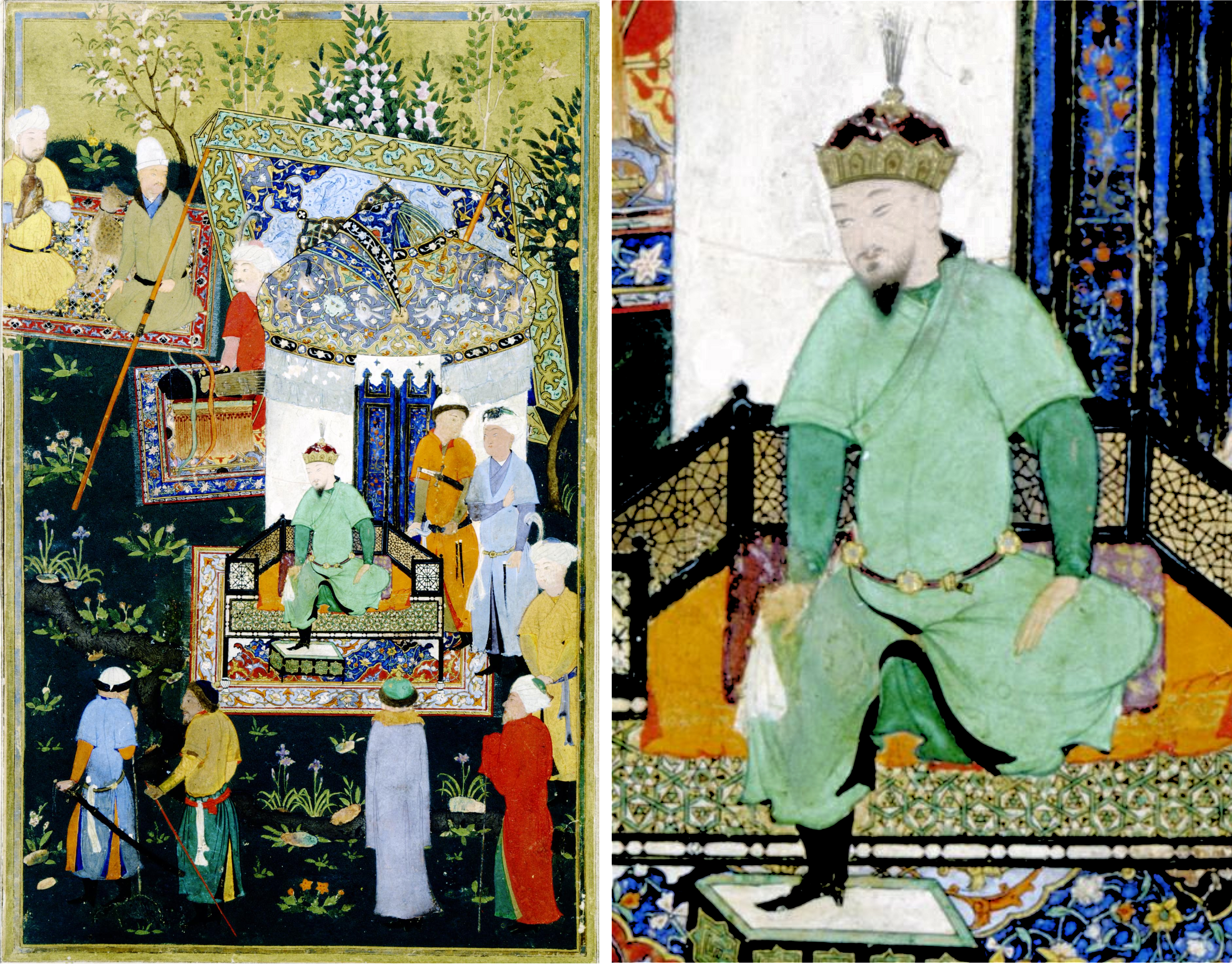
Depiction of Timur granting audience on the occasion of his accession, 1467 edition

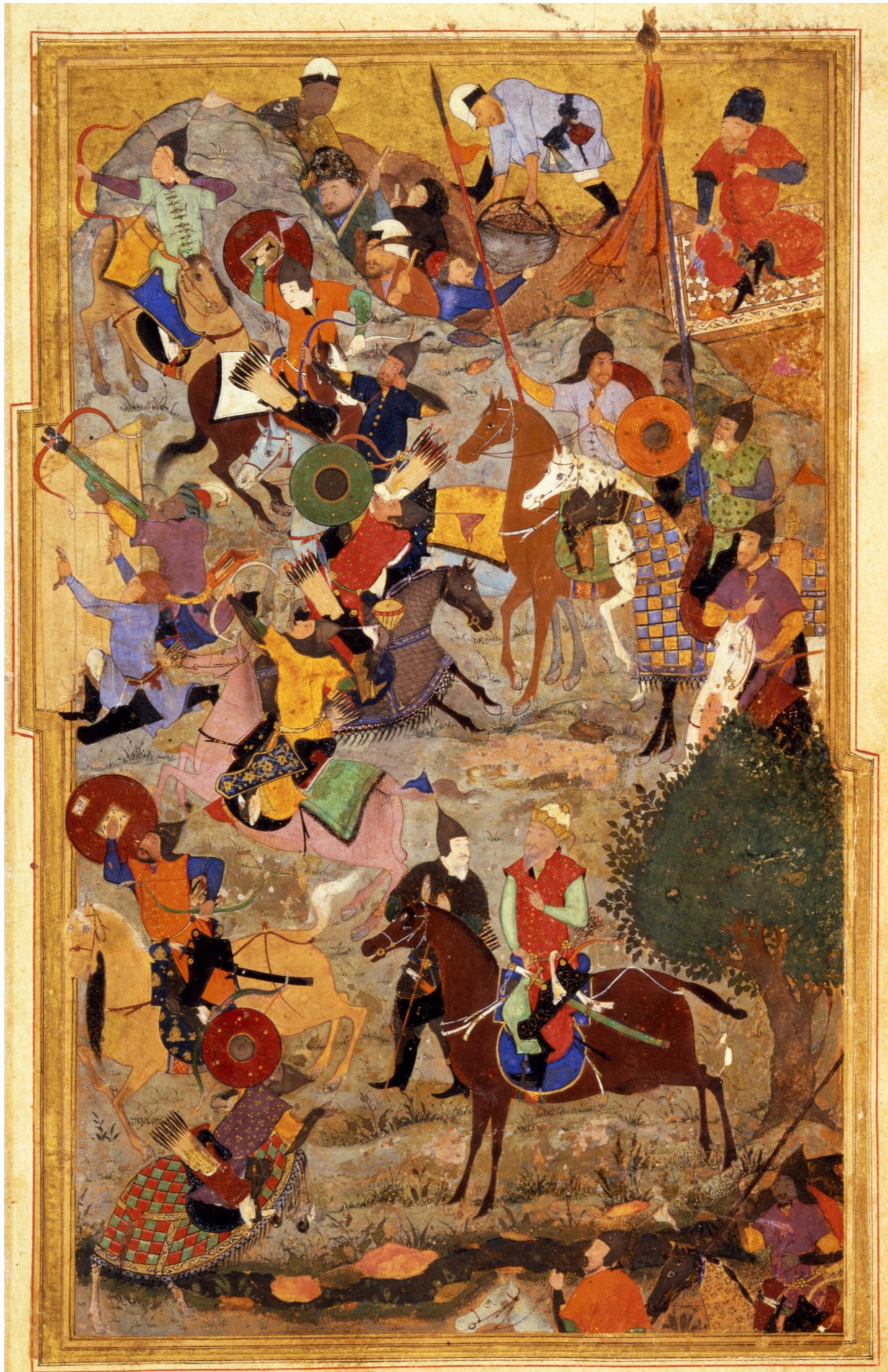
Assault on the Fortress of the Knights of St. John at Smyrna

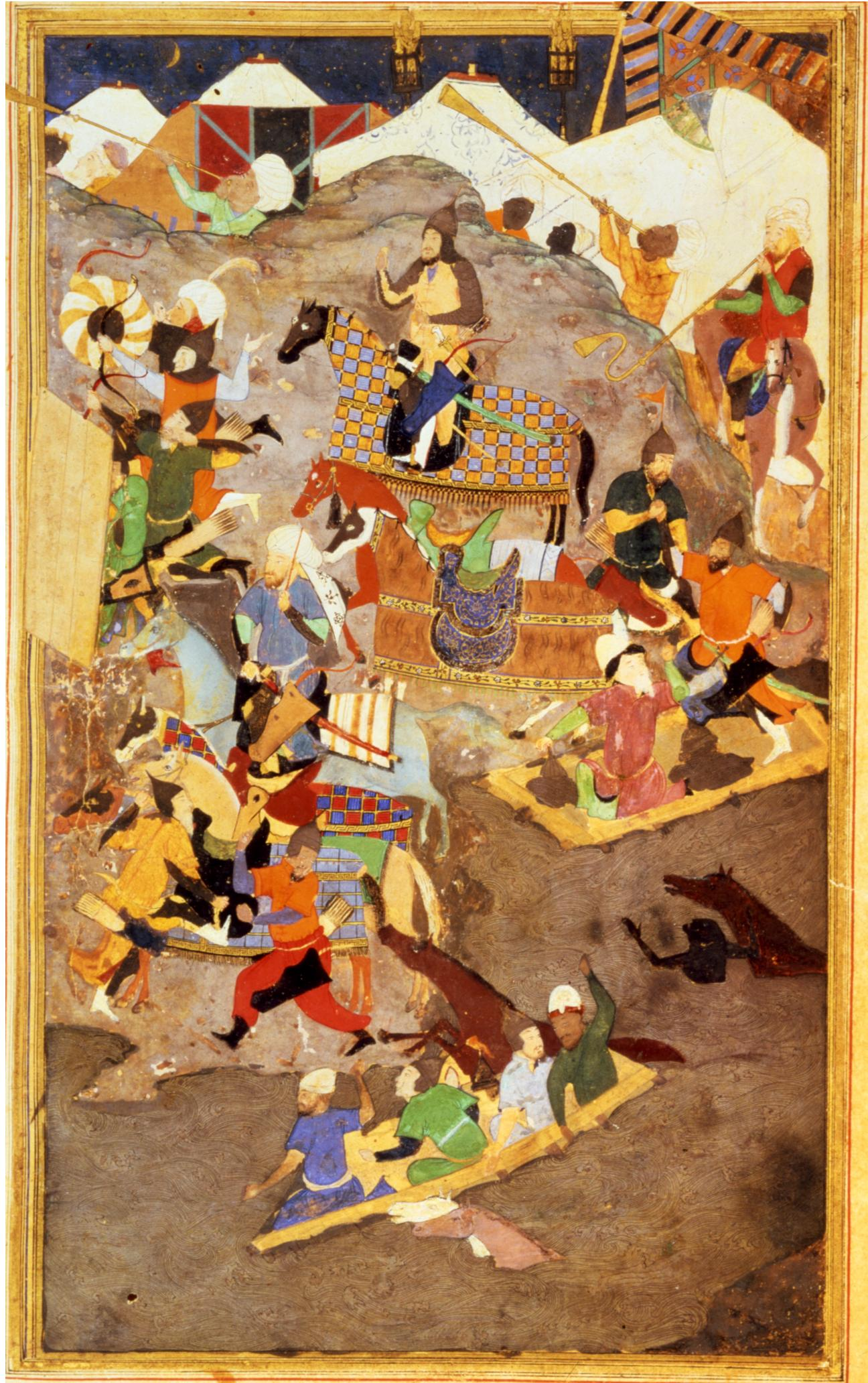
Battle on the River Oxus

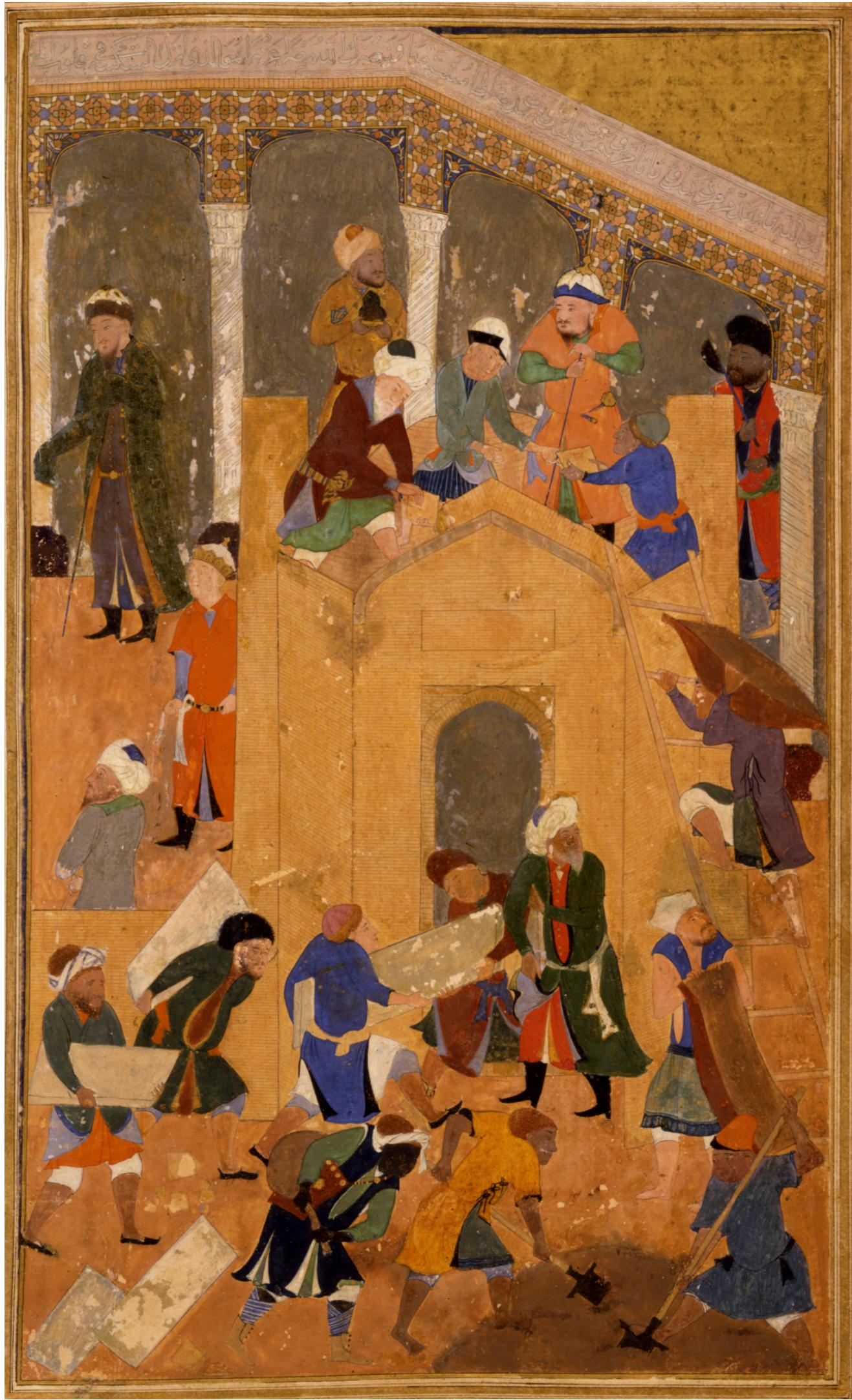
Building of the Great Mosque in Samarkand

=== 1485 edition (Herat, Afghanistan) ===
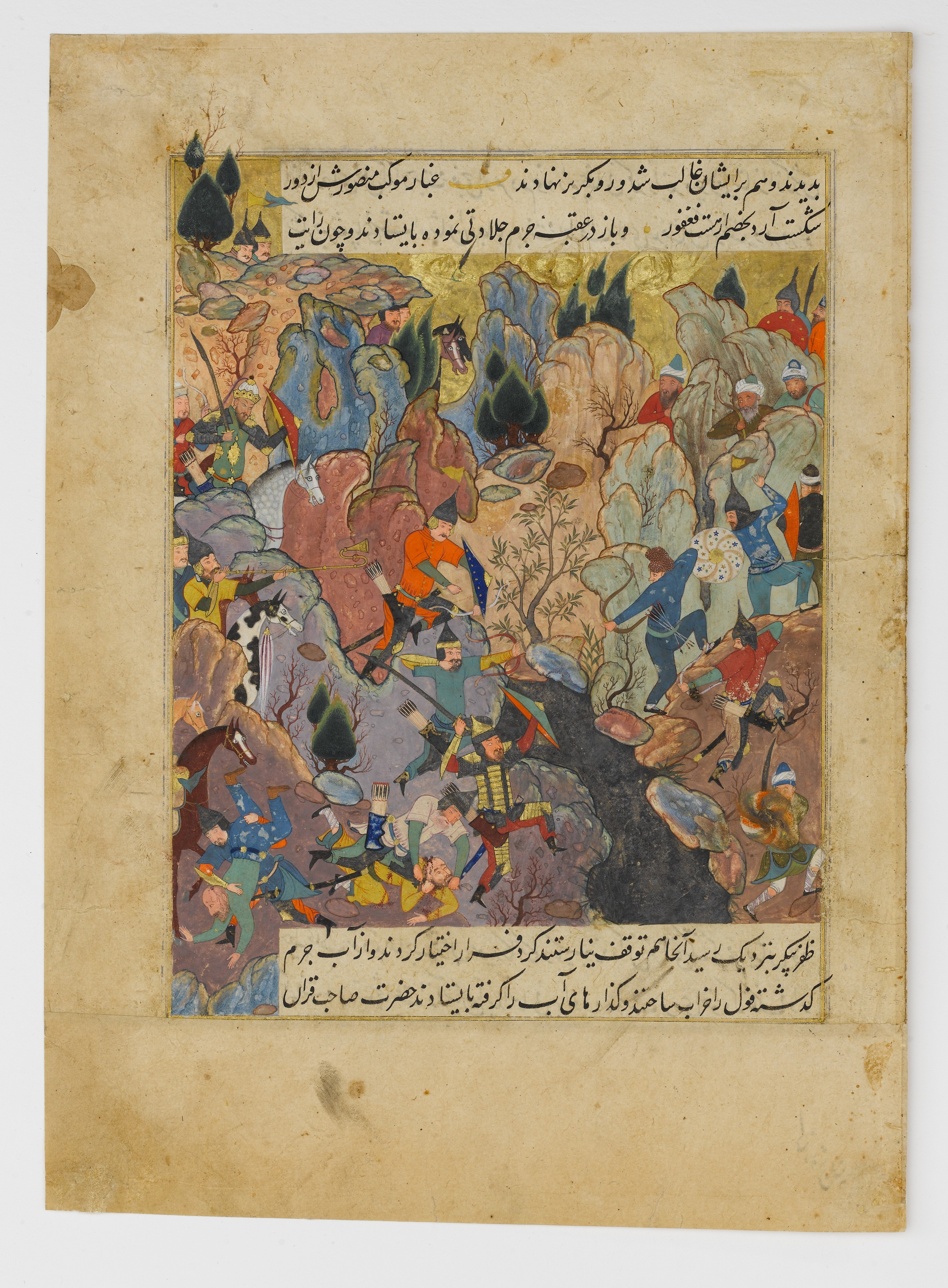
Battle scene with Timur

=== 1595-1600 edition (Akbar's copy) ===
This is Akbar's copy, completed between 1595 and 1600.

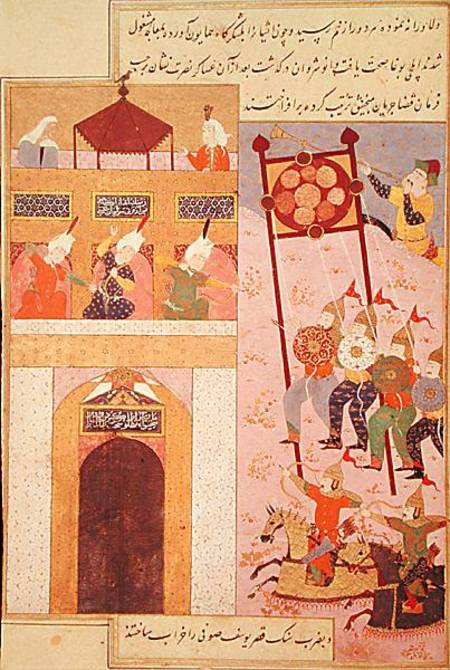
Timur besieging Urganj. Published 1595–1600

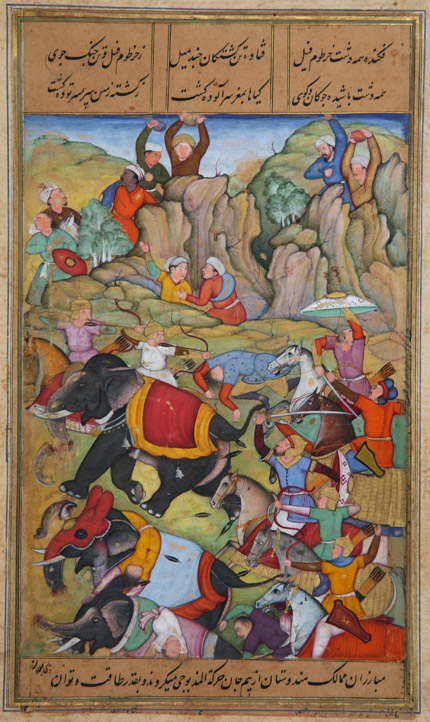
Timur defeats the sultan of Delhi, from Akbar's copy, between 1595 and 1600

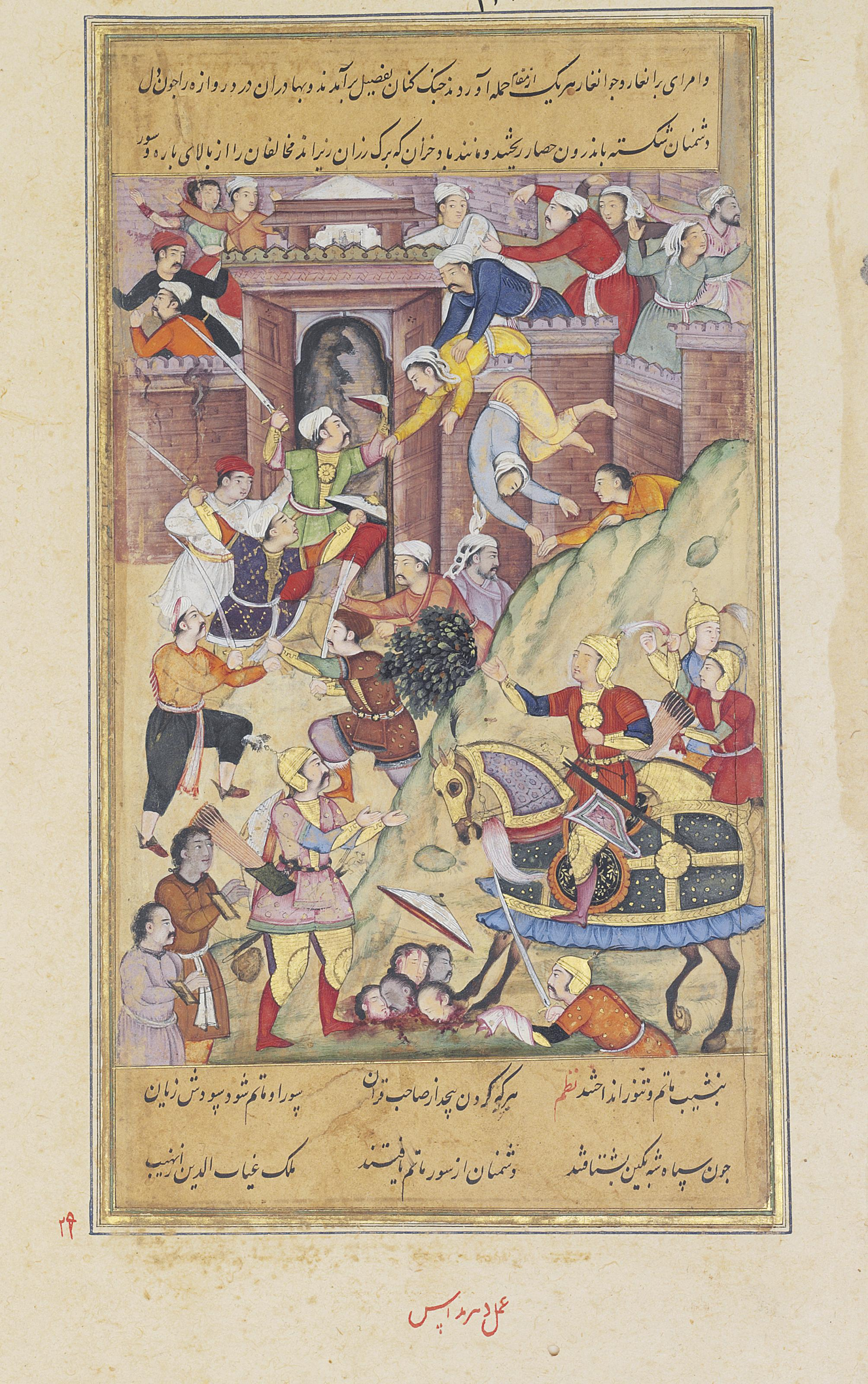
Timur's army attacks the fortress of Herat and Ghiyath al-Din, the Kartid ruler, sues for peace, signed Dharm Das, Mughal India, circa 1595-1600.

=== Other editions ===
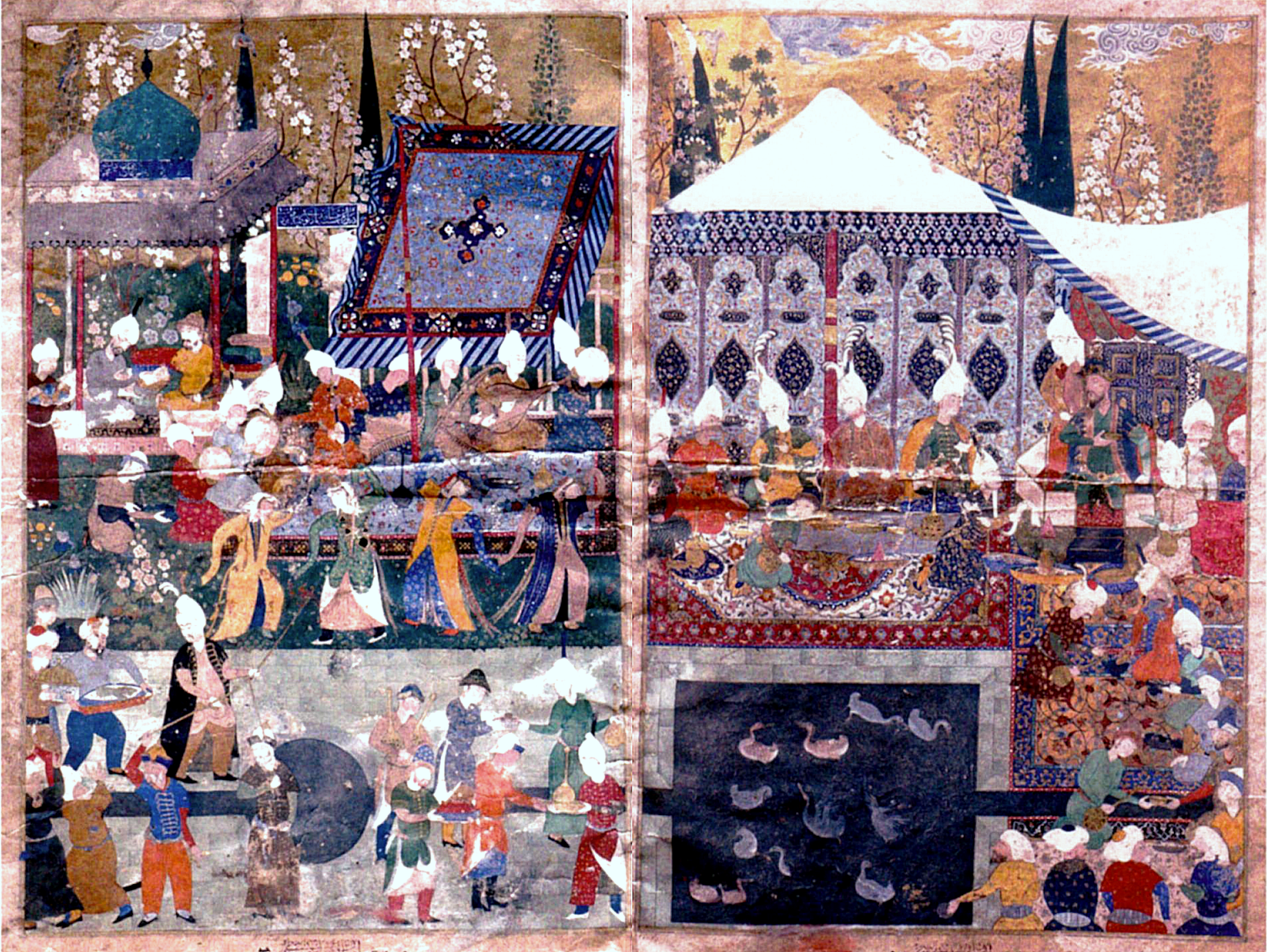
Wedding of Timurid Princes (Muhammad Sultan, Pir Muhammad and Shah Rukh)

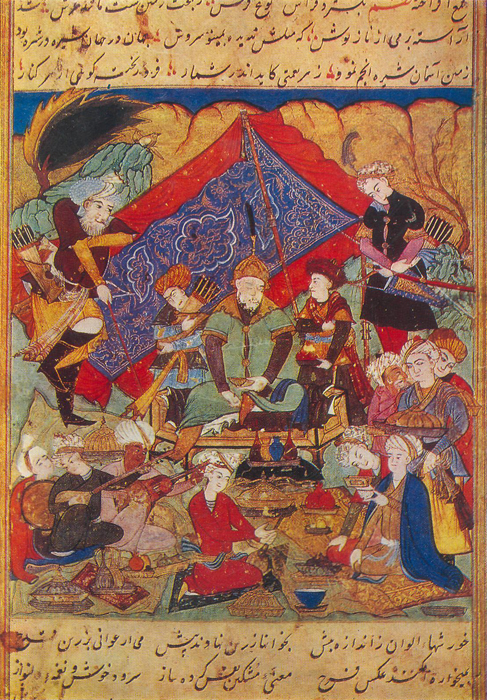
Timur feasts in the environs of Samarkand, 1628

== Extent Persian Zafarnamas ==
List of illustrated Persian Zafarnamas:

- Ibrahim Sultan dispersed Shiraz 1436, scribe Ya‘qub b. Hasan Suraj al-Husaini
- Tashkent 3340 Herat Early 15th c?
- John Hopkins Garrett, Sultan-Husain, Herat Text 1468 Paintings 1480s, scribe Shir ‘Ali
- Topkapı Revan 1522, Herat 1479, scribe ‘Imad al-Din
- Istanbul TIEM 1964 Herat and Shiraz Text 1486, Paintings 15th–16th c, scribes Hamd-Allah b. Shaikh, Murshid al-Katib
- British Library Add. 7635 Shiraz 1523, scribe Murshid al-Katib ‘Attar
- Topkapı H. 1370 Shiraz 1526, scribe Murshid al-Katib ‘Attar
- Gulistan Palace MS 708 Herat and Tabriz 1529, scribe Sultan Muhammad Nur
- British Library I.O. 137 Shiraz 1533, scribe Murshid al-Katib ‘Attar
- Preetorius Collection, dispersed, Shiraz 1546, scribe Murshid al-Katib ‘Attar
- British Library Or. 1359 Shiraz 1552, scribes Murshid al-Katib ‘Attar and Hasan al-Sharif
- Bodleian Lib. Elliott 345 Shiraz c. 1560
- National Library of Russia, Dorn 295, Shiraz 1565, scribe Amir ‘Ali al-Katib
- Gulistan Palace MS 2178 Mid 16th c.
- Inst. of Oriental MSS D 314 Text 15th c. Pictures 19th c?
- British Library Or. 1052 Ahmadabad 1600
- Tashkent MS 4472 Shiraz and Samarqand? Text 1439, pictures 1629
- Bodleian Lib. Digby Or. 263, 17th cent.?, scribe ‘Ali b. Jalal al-Din al-Jandaqi
