= Nizam al-Din Shami =

Persian chronicler

Nizam al-Din Shami, also known as Nizam-i Shami or Nizam al-Din Shambi (died before 1409 or before 1411–1412), was a Persian man of letters and a chronicler who flourished in the late 14th and early 15th centuries. He wrote the Zafarnama, the earliest extant Timurid chronicle and the oldest surviving biography on Timur (r. 1370–1405). Shami's Zafarnama was continued by Hafiz-i Abru (died 1430), and would also form the basis of the better-known Zafarnama of Sharaf al-Din Ali Yazdi (died 1454).

== Biography ==
Although neither the date of birth nor the place of Shami is recorded, his nisba (Shami < Shanbi) implies a birthplace in Shanb-i Ghazani, a suburb (or quarter) of Tabriz in the northwestern Iranian region of Azerbaijan in which the Ilkhan Ghazan (r. 1295–1304) had set up a charitable foundation. Shami's father and brother were named Muhammad, but little else is known about his family or his own early life. He held the titles of mawlana ("our master") and va'iz ("preacher"), which suggests that he received a traditional Islamic religious education. The fact that he authored a work in praise of the Twelve Imams also suggests, at the bare minimum, was sympathetic to the line of Ali (died 661). The modern historian İlker Evrim Binbaş refers to Shami within this context as being a preacher "with the tinge of 'Alīd-loyalism".

Shami entered the service of the Jalayirid ruler Shaykh Uways Jalayir (r. 1356–1374). The Jalayirids were successors of the Ilkhans in Iraq and Azerbaijan. In 1366-1367, he translated Silwan al-Mutaε (The Consoling of the Ruler) from Arabic to Persian, a didactic political work in the specula principum genre by Ibn Zafar al-Siqilli (died 1169-1170).

According to Shami's own writings, when Timur arrived in front of Baghdad on 29 August 1393, Shami was the first of Baghdad's inhabitants to come and submit to him. When Shami was on pilgrimage en route to the Hejaz, shortly prior to Timur's attack on Aleppo in 1400, Shami found himself incarcerated by Aleppo's authorities, who believed he was spying on them on Timur's behalf. Due to this, Shami became an eyewitness to Timur's siege of the town and the town's eventual surrender. After Timur's capture of Aleppo, he was brought before Timur for the second time, and appears to have remained in his entourage. Shortly after, in 1401-1402, he was ordered by Timur to write a comprehensive history on his conquests with the stipulation that it be in a clear, unadorned style, in order to make to readable to every reader and not just a select few. Shami presented the chronicle to Timur around April 1404. The modern historian Peter Jackson explains that the title Zafarnama is not attested in the original recension utilised later in the compilations of Hafiz-i Abru, but only in a second version dedicated by Shami to Umar Bahadur, Timur's grandson (who had also just been appointed governor of Azerbaijan). Shami did not travel to Transoxania with Timur in 1404, but remained in his home province of Azerbaijan. Shami most likely entered Umar Bahadur's service following Timur's death in 1405. According to Hafiz-i Abru, Shami was dead by 1411-1412, although he is also said to have died before 1409. He enjoyed prestige amongst his contemporaries for his erudition. Sharaf al-Din Ali Yazdi referred to Shami as one of the best writers of his age in his own Zafarnama.

Shami's Zafarnama, the earliest extant Timurid chronicle and the oldest surviving biography on Timur, was continued by Hafiz-i Abru as the Zayl-i Zafarnama, which dealt with Timur's life from 1404 tot 1405. Shami's Zafarnama would also form the basis of the better-known Zafarnama of Sharaf al-Din Yazdi.

== Sources ==
- Balabanlilar, Lisa (2020). The Emperor Jahangir: Power and Kingship in Mughal India. I.B. Tauris.
- Binbaş, İlker Evrim (2016). Intellectual Networks in Timurid Iran: Sharaf al-Dīn 'Alī Yazdī and the Islamicate Republic of Letters. Cambridge University Press.
- Jackson, P. (1997). "S̲h̲āmī, Niẓām al-Dīn". In Bosworth, C. E.; van Donzel, E.; Heinrichs, W. P. & Lecomte, G. (eds.). The Encyclopaedia of Islam, Second Edition. Volume IX: San–Sze. Leiden: E. J. Brill. ISBN 978-90-04-10422-8.
- Subtelny, Maria Eva; Melville, Charles (2002). "ḤĀFEẒ-E ABRU". In Yarshater, Ehsan (ed.). Encyclopædia Iranica. Vol. XI/5: Hadith II–Ḥājj Sayyāḥ. London and New York: Routledge & Kegan Paul. pp. 507–509. ISBN 978-0-933273-69-6.
- Woods, John E. (1987). "The Rise of Tīmūrid Historiography". Journal of Near Eastern Studies. 46 (2): 81–108. doi:10.1086/373225. JSTOR 545014.
