= Tokhtamysh–Timur war =

1386–1395 war between Tokhtamysh and Timur

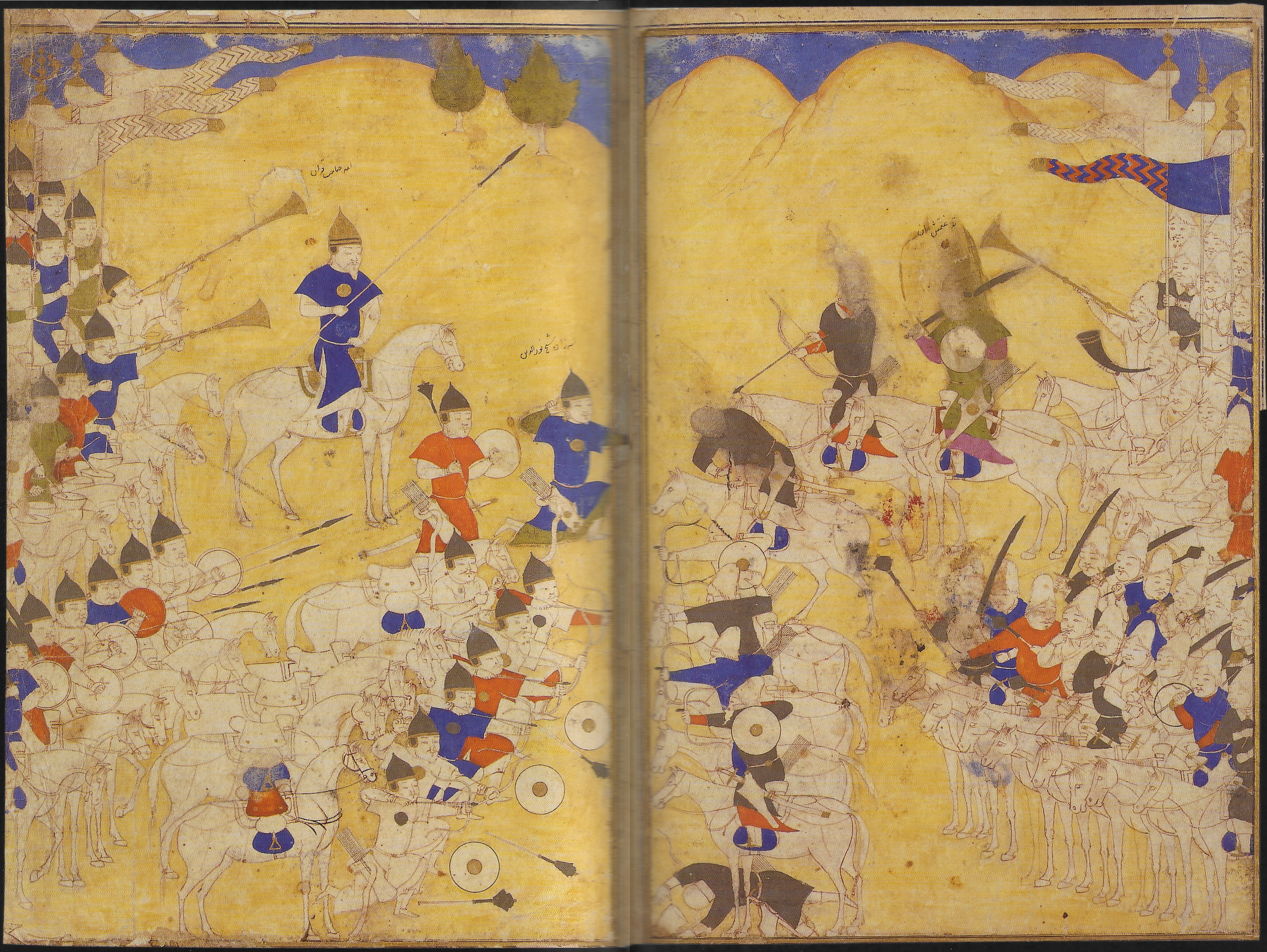
- Battle between Timur (left) and Tokhtamysh (right). Topkapi H.2153, 1420–1440, possibly Herat.
Date	1386–1395
Location	Caucasus; Eastern Europe; Turkestan
Result	Timurid victory

Belligerents
Golden Horde	Timurid Empire

Commanders and leaders
Tokhtamysh	Timur

The Tokhtamysh–Timur war was fought from 1386 to 1395 between Tokhtamysh, the khan of the Golden Horde, and the warlord and conqueror Timur, founder of the Timurid Empire, in the areas of the Caucasus Mountains, Turkestan and Eastern Europe. The battle between Timur and Tokhtamysh played a key role in the decline of Mongol power over the Russian principalities.

== Background ==
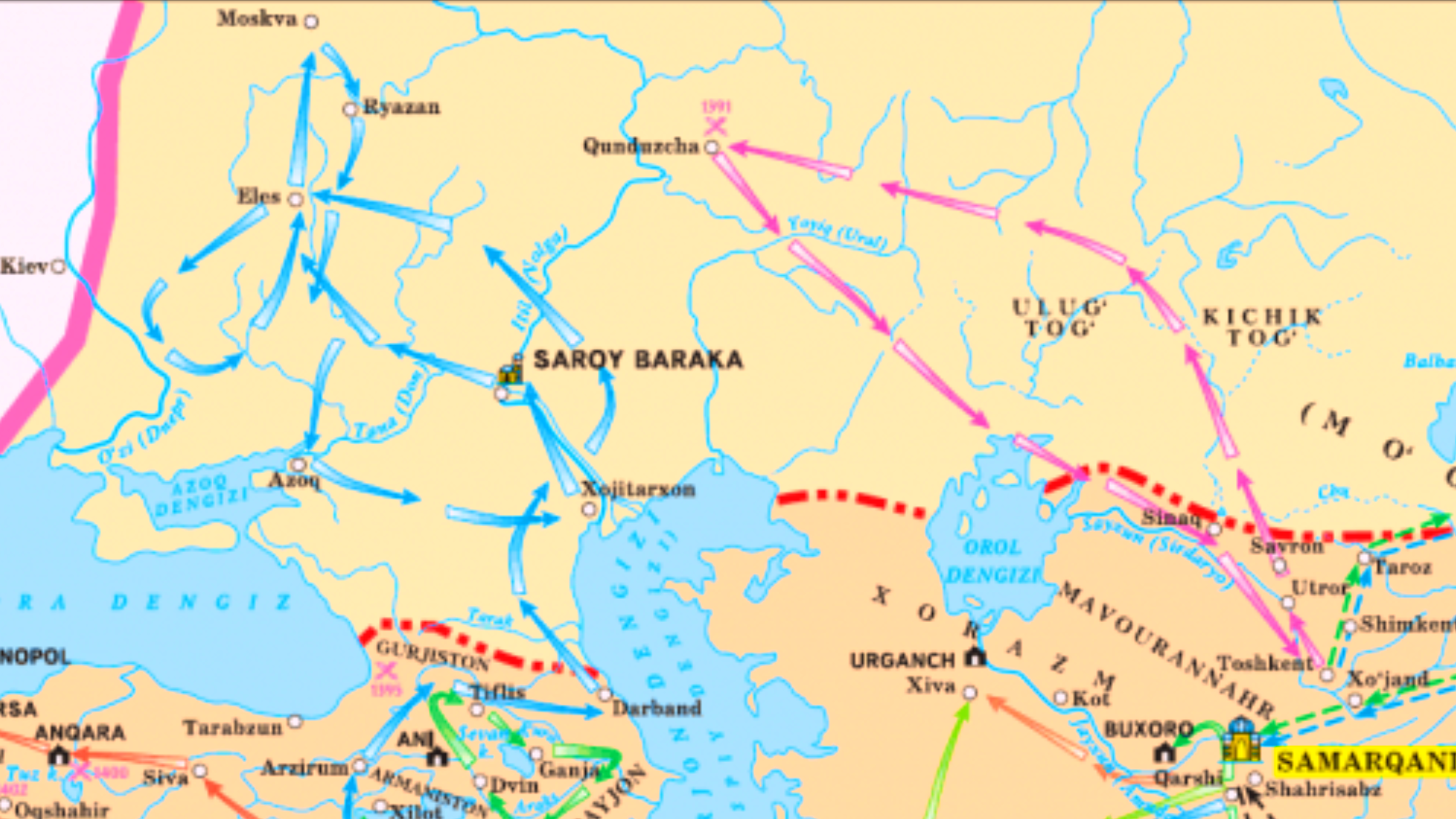
Timur's invasion of Golden Horde.

In the Golden Horde, the Jochids faced succession crises, which reflected the decline of Chingissid power across Eurasia. In the late 1370s and early 1380s, Timur helped Tokhtamysh assume supreme power in the White Horde against Tokhtamysh's uncle Urus Khan. The Blue Horde, which had fallen under the control of Mamai, was also seized by Tokhtamysh. Mamai's power declined after his defeat following an attempt to subdue the rebellious Russian grand prince, Dmitry Donskoy, and he then suffered a military defeat at the hands of Tokhtamysh.

Afterward, Tokhtamysh united the White and Blue Hordes, thereby becoming the undisputed ruler of the Golden Horde, and launched a massive military punitive campaign against the Russian principalities between 1381 and 1382, restoring Turco-Mongol (or Tatar) power in Russia after the defeat of Mamai at the Battle of Kulikovo in 1380. In particular, he demanded submission from Dmitry Donskoy and laid siege to Moscow in 1382. After Moscow was sacked, Tokhtamysh was still willing to compromise with the Russians because he could not afford constant conflict.

The Golden Horde, after a period of anarchy between the early 1360s and late 1370s, briefly re-established itself as a dominant regional power, defeating the Grand Duchy of Lithuania around 1383. However, Tokhtamysh had territorial ambitions in Persia and Central Asia, and this led to conflict with Timur, who had founded the Timurid Empire in the region.

== War ==
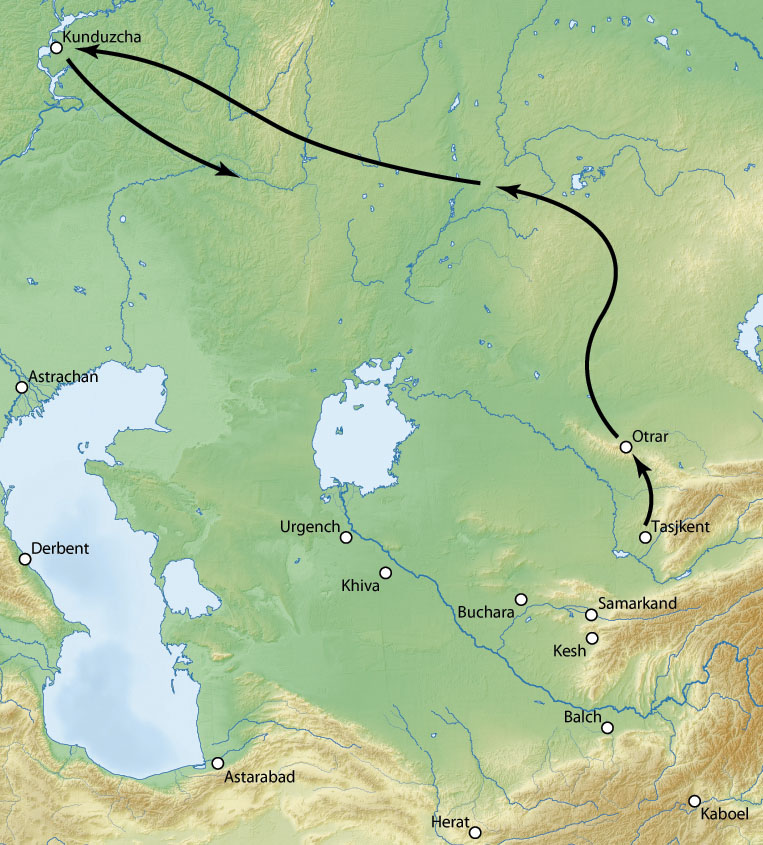
Timur's movements, 1391–1392.

After the death of Abu Sa'id in 1335, the last ruler of the Ilkhanid Dynasty, a power vacuum emerged in Persia. Persia's vulnerability led to military incursions from Persia's neighbours. In 1383 Timur started his military conquest of that country. In 1385 he captured Herat, Khorasan and all of eastern Persia. In the same year Tokhtamysh raided Azerbaijan and northwestern Iran.

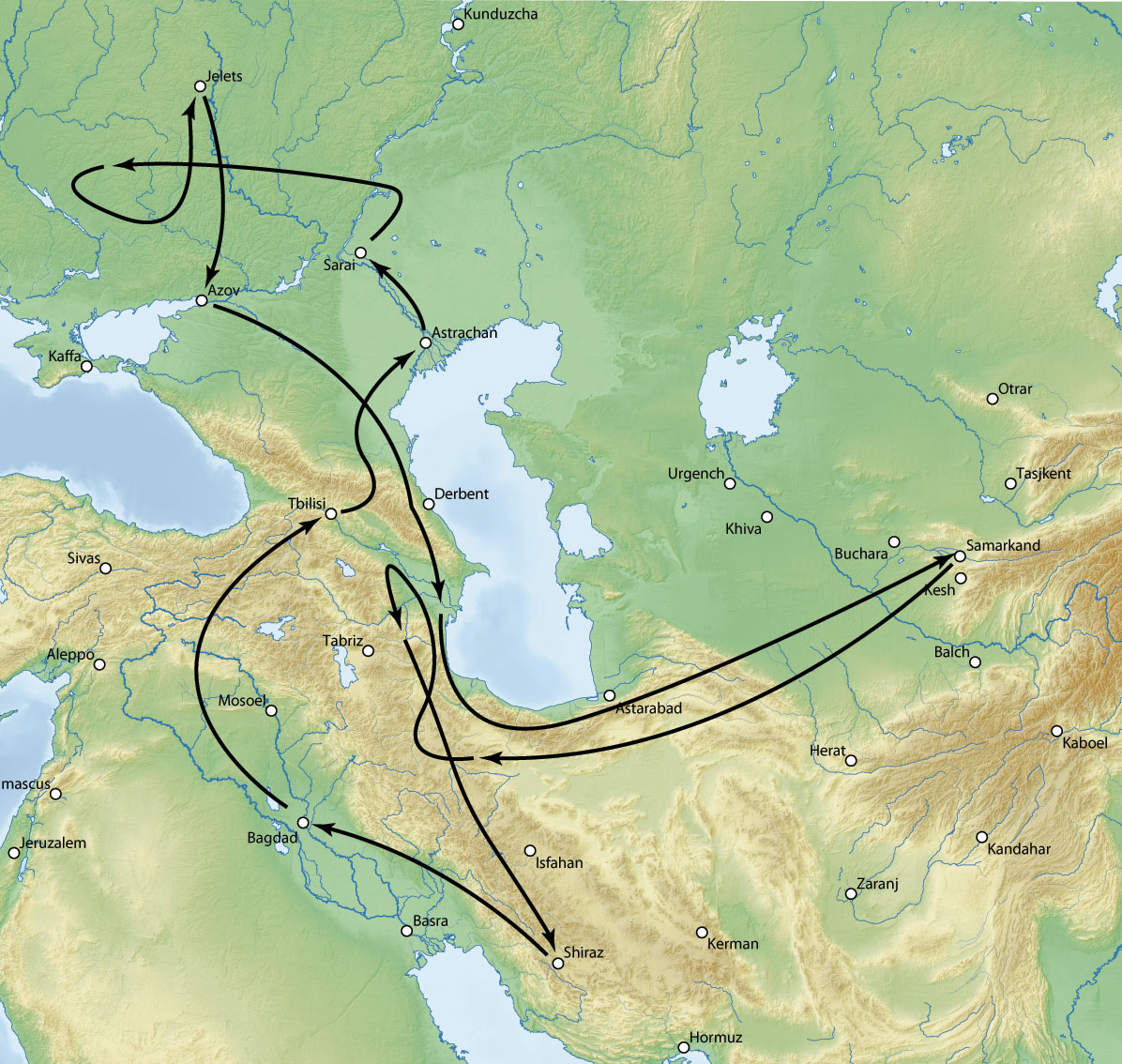
Timur's movements, 1392–1396.

In 1386, the city of Tabriz was plundered and Tokhtamysh retired with a rich booty. Between 1389 and 1391, there was intense fighting between Timur's forces and the Golden Horde. The first phase was won by Timur at the Battle of the Kondurcha River. Vasily I of Moscow took advantage of the war, and in 1392, during a visit to the court of the weakened Tokhtamysh, Vasily was given permission to take the throne of Nizhny Novgorod. Despite the setback, Tokhtamysh recovered his position and in the spring of 1395 raided the Timurid territory of Shirvan.

In 1395, Timur launched his final assault on the Golden Horde. He decisively routed Tokhtamysh in the Battle of the Terek River on 15 April 1395. All the major cities of the khanate were destroyed: Sarai, Ukek, Majar, Azaq, Tana and Astrakhan. Timur's attack on the cities of the Golden Horde in 1395 produced his first Western European victims, since it caused the destruction of the Italian trading colonies (comptoirs) in Sarai, Tana and Astrakhan. During the siege of Tana, the trading communities sent representatives to treat with Timur, but the latter only used them in a ruse to reconnoiter the city. The Genoese city of Caffa on the Crimean peninsula was spared, despite being a former ally of Tokhtamysh.

== Aftermath ==
After his resounding defeat in the Battle of the Terek River, Tokhtamysh was deposed and replaced by Edigu, fleeing to the Ukrainian steppes and asking for help from Grand Duke Vytautas of Lithuania. Timur then set about devastating Tokhtamysh's domains and turned his army towards Moscow. Vasily I of Moscow gathered an army, while Metropolitan Cyprian brought the Our Lady of Vladimir icon, but Timur stopped his advance and withdrew from Russian territory, which chroniclers claimed was due to a vision of the Virgin defending Moscow with a heavenly host, which convinced him to turn away. Tokhtamysh and Vytautas combined their forces in the Battle of the Vorskla River in 1399, but were crushingly defeated by Khan Temür Qutlugh and Edigu, two of Timur's generals. Around 1406, Tokhtamysh was killed in Siberia by Edigu's men; Edigu, in turn, would be slain thirteen years later by one of Tokhtamysh's sons.

The Golden Horde never recovered from this war. In the middle of the 15th century, it fragmented into smaller khanates: the Kazan Khanate, Nogai Horde, Uzbek Khanate, Kazakh Khanate, Qasim Khanate, Crimean Khanate, and Astrakhan Khanate. Thus, Tatar-Mongol power over the Russian principalities was weakened and this allowed Moscow to continue the "gathering of the Russian lands" and eventually become the dominant Russian state. Vasily I of Moscow stopped paying tribute and did not recognize the suzerainty of successive khans, but an invasion by Edigu in 1408 and continuous Tatar raids caused Vasily to visit the Horde in 1412 and recognize the khan as his suzerain again. In 1480, the 'Tatar yoke' over Russia, a reminder of the bloody Mongol conquest, was definitively shaken in the Great Stand on the Ugra River. The last remnant of the Golden Horde was destroyed by the Crimean Khanate in 1502, and the Khanates that arose after the Golden Horde's fragmentation were annexed by Muscovite Russia between the 1550s and early 17th century. The Crimean Khanate survived until 1783, under Ottoman protection. The Kazakh Khanate survived until mid-19th century.

== See also ==
- Karsakpay inscription

== Sources ==
- "Кондырча буендагы сугыш". Tatar Encyclopaedia (in Tatar). Kazan: The Republic of Tatarstan Academy of Sciences. Institution of the Tatar Encyclopaedia. 2002.
- Bernardini, Michele (2017). "Tīmūr and the 'Frankish' Powers" (PDF). In Norman Housley (ed.). The Crusade in the Fifteenth Century. Routledge. pp. 109–119.
- Crummey, Robert O. (6 June 2014). The Formation of Muscovy 1300 - 1613. Routledge. ISBN 978-1-317-87200-9.
- Favereau, Marie; Pochekaev, Roman Yu. (2023). "The Golden Horde, c. 1260–1502". The Cambridge History of the Mongol Empire. Cambridge University Press. pp. 243–318. ISBN 978-1-107-11648-1.
- Galeotti, Mark (5 November 2024). Forged in War: A Military History of Russia from Its Beginnings to Today. Bloomsbury USA. ISBN 978-1-4728-6251-8.
