= Sharaf al-Din Ali Yazdi =

Persian scholar (died 1454)

- شرف الدین علی یزدی
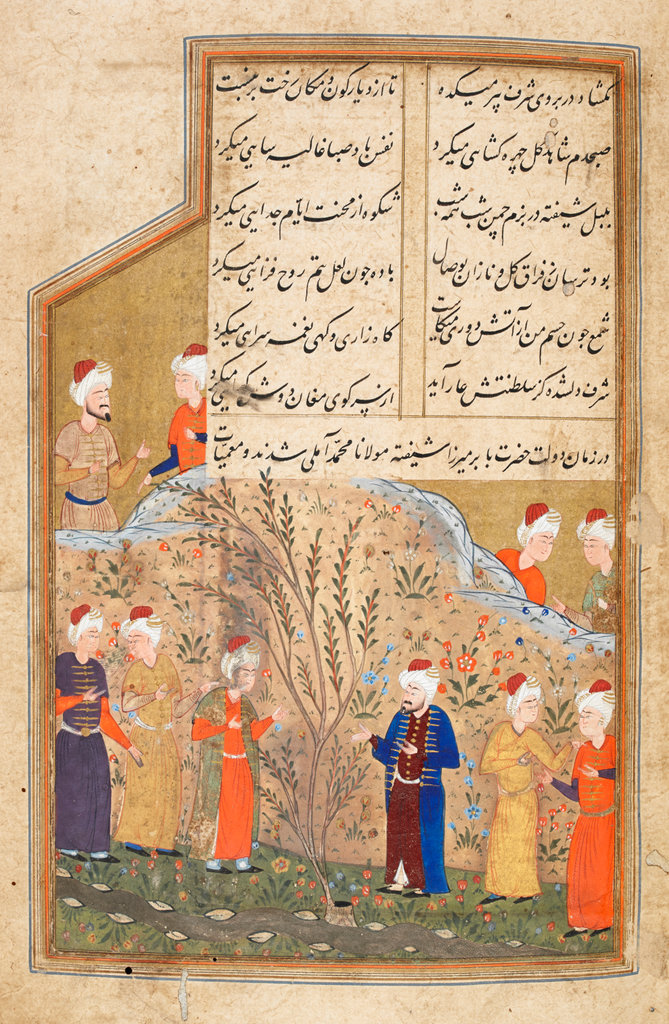
- Sharaf al-Din 'Ali Yazdi with Muhammad Amuli for whom he wrote poems and riddles. Folio from the Majalis al-'ushshaq of Kamal al-Din Gazurgahi, created in Shiraz, dated c. 1560
- Born: 1370s Yazd, Iran
- Died: 1454; Yazd, Iran
- Occupations: Historian; scholar; poet

Academic work
- Era: 15th century
- Discipline: History, mathematics, astronomy, literature
- Notable works: Zafarnama

Sharaf ad-Din Ali Yazdi or Sharif al-Din Ali’ Yazdi (Persian: شرف الدین علی یزدی; died 1454, Yazd), also known by his pen name Sharaf, was a 15th-century Persian scholar who authored several works in the arts and sciences, including mathematics, astronomy, enigma, literature such as poetry, and history. The Zafarnama, a life of Timur, is his most famous work.

Sharif al-Din was born in the city of Yazd, Iran in the 1370s. He devoted much of his life to scholarship, furthering his education in Syria and Egypt until Timur's death in 1405.

As a young man, he was a teacher in his native city of Yazd and a close companion of the Timurid ruler Shahrukh (1405–47) and his son Ibrahim Sultan. In 1442/43 he became the close advisor of the governor of Iraq, Mirza Sultan Muhammad, who lived in the city of Qom.

Sharif al-Din rebelled against Shahrukh Timur in 1446/47 when the government was vulnerable, but was later sent to different cities for his acumen. The later years of his life were spent in Taft, where he died in 1454.

Sharif al-Din was directed to write a biography of Timur in 1421 known as the Zafarnama, which he completed four years later in 1425. Timur's grandson Sultan Abu al-Fath Ibrahim Mirza was Sharif al-Din's patron during the completion of his grandfather's biography.

== Translated works ==
- The History of Timur-Bec: Known by the Name of Tamerlain the Great, Emperor of the Moguls and Tartars: Being an Historical Journal of His Conquests in Asia and Europe, Volume 2 (1723)
