= Battle of the Terek River =

1395 battle of Tokhtamysh–Timur war

Coordinates: 43°35′N 47°27′E

- Part of the Tokhtamysh–Timur war
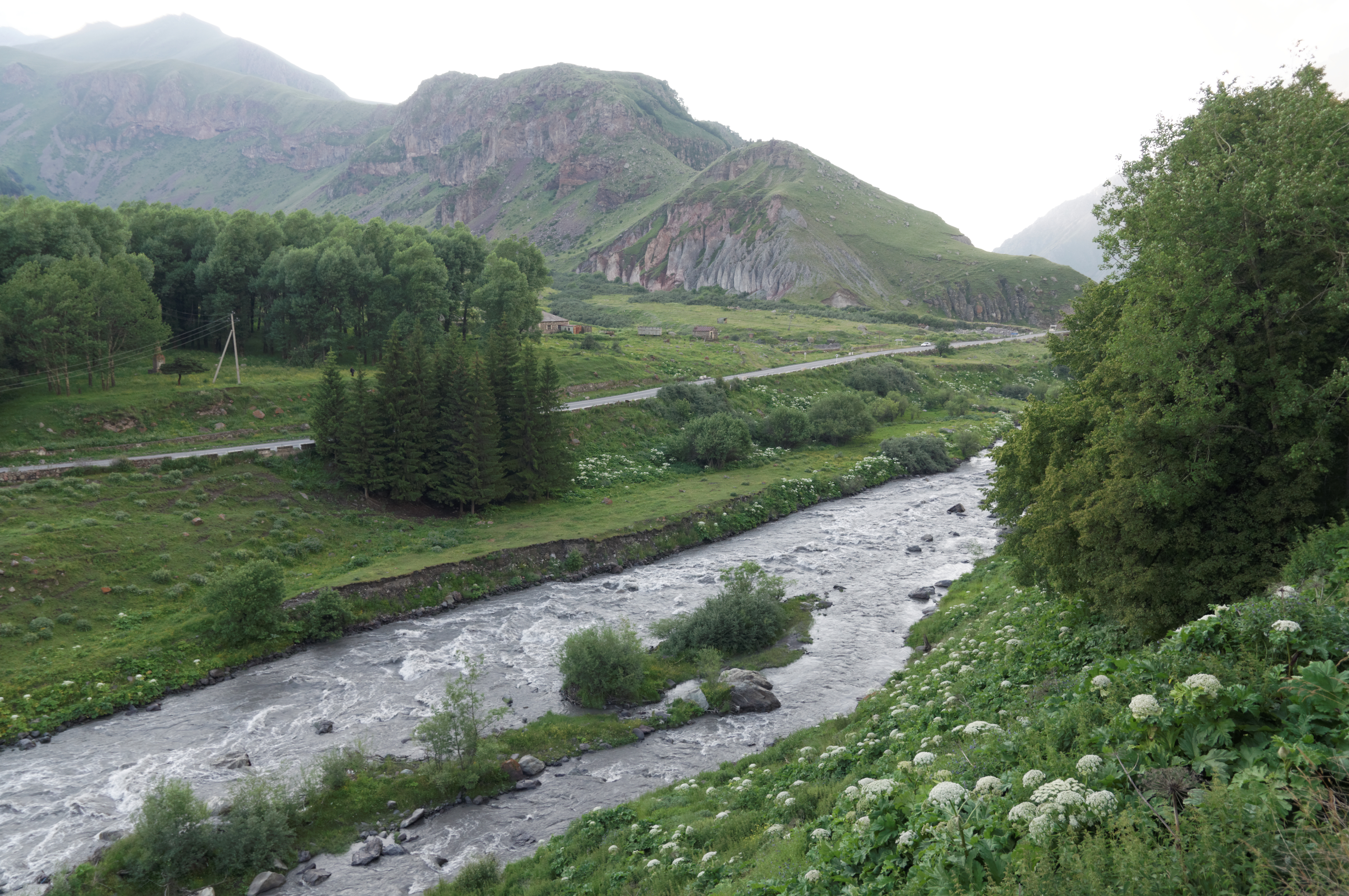
- Upper course of the Terek river, Northern Georgia
Date	14 April 1395
Location	North Caucasus, Golden Horde
Result	Timurid victory

Belligerents
Timurid Empire	Golden Horde: Alans; Zichia; Simsim

Commanders and leaders
Timur	Tokhtamysh
- Location within West and Central Asia

The Battle of the Terek River was the last major battle of the Tokhtamysh–Timur war. It took place on 14 April 1395, at the Terek River, North Caucasus. The result was a victory for Timur.

== Battle ==
Tokhtamysh's cavalry attacked the right flank and the center of Timur's army. Instead of forcing Timur's army back, some Golden Horde emirs went over to Timur's side. According to the Mamluk ambassadors, a bey named Aktau left the battlefield with thousands of his warriors, and this ultimately led to Tokhtamysh's defeat. Timur, along with the defected emirs, defeated the left flank of Tokhtamysh's army, forcing his army into a rout. The victorious army of Timur dispersed Tokhtamysh's army.

== Aftermath ==
While pursuing Tokhtamysh, Timur annihilated the cities of Astrakhan, Sarai, and Azov. Tokhtamysh had fled north, and the Genoese sent messengers with gifts to Timur in exchange for safe passage, and so Caffa was left untouched as the rest of Crimea was devastated by Timur's forces in August 1395. Edigu expanded his realm and installed Temür Qutlugh as the khan of the Golden Horde around 1397.

== Sources ==
- Favereau, Marie (20 April 2021). The Horde: How the Mongols Changed the World. Harvard University Press. ISBN 978-0-674-24421-4.
- Manz, Beatrice (2000). "Timur Lang". In Bearman, P. J.; Bianquis, T.; Bosworth, C. E.; Van Donzel, E.; Heinrichs, W. P. (eds.). The Encyclopedia of Islam. Vol. X. Brill.
- Tucker, Spencer C., ed. (2010). "April 14, 1395: Central Asia and Russia". A Global Chronology of Conflict: From the Ancient World to the Modern Middle East. Vol. One: ca. 3000 BCE–1499 CE. ABC-CLIO.
- Van Donzel, E., ed. (1994). "Toqtamish, Ghiyath al-Din". Islamic Desk Reference. E.J. Brill.
