= History of Chechnya =

The history of Chechnya may refer to the history of the Chechens, of their land Chechnya, or of the land of Ichkeria.

Chechen society has traditionally been organized around multiple autonomous local clans, called taips. The traditional Chechen saying goes that the members of Chechen society, like its taips, are (ideally) "free and equal like wolves".

== Prehistoric and archeological finds ==
The first known settlement of what is now Chechnya is thought to have occurred around 12500 BCE, in mountain-cave settlements, whose inhabitants used basic tools, fire, and animal hides. Traces of human settlement go back to 40000 BCE with cave paintings and artifacts around Lake Kezanoi.

The ancestors of the Nakh peoples are thought to have populated the Central Caucasus around 10000–8000 BCE. This colonization is thought by some (including E. Veidenbaum, who cites similarities with later structures to propose continuity) to represent the whole Eastern Caucasian language family, though this is not universally agreed upon. The proto-language that is thought to be the ancestor of all Eastern Caucasian ("Alarodian") languages, in fact, has words for concepts such as the wheel, so it is thought that the region had intimate links to the Fertile Crescent (many scholars supporting the thesis that the Eastern Caucasians originally came from the Northern Fertile Crescent, and backing this up with linguistic affinities of the Urartian and Hurrian languages to the Northeast Caucasus). According to Johanna Nichols, "the Nakh–Dagestanian languages are the closest thing we have to a direct continuation of the cultural and linguistic community that gave rise to Western civilization."

=== Kura-Araxes culture ===
Towns were built in the area that is now Chechnya as early as 8000 BCE. Pottery, too, came around the same time, and so did stone weaponry, stone utensils, stone jewelry items, etc. (as well as clay dishes). This period was known as the Kura-Araxes culture. Amjad Jaimoukha notes that there was a large amount of cultural diffusion between the later Kura-Araxes culture and the Maikop culture. The economy was primarily built around cattle and farming.

=== Kayakent culture ===
The trend of a highly progressive Caucasus continued: as early as 3000–4000 BCE, evidence of metalworking (including copper) as well as more advanced weaponry (daggers, arrow heads found, as well as armor, knives, etc.). This period is referred to as the Kayakent culture, or Chechnya during the Copper Age. Horseback riding came around 3000 BCE, probably having diffused from contact with Indo-European-speaking tribes to the North. Towns found in this period are often not found as ruins, but rather on the outskirts of (or even inside) modern towns in both Chechnya and Ingushetia, suggesting much continuity. There is bone evidence suggesting that raising of small sheep and goats occurred. Clay and stone were used for all building purposes. Agriculture was highly developed, as evidenced by the presence of copper flint blades with wooden or bone handles.

=== Kharachoi culture ===
The term Kharachoi culture denotes the Early Bronze Age of Chechnya. Clay jugs and stone grain containers indicate a high level of development of trade and culture. Earlier finds show that extensive hunting was still practiced. There was a lack of pig bones, demonstrating that the domestication of pigs hadn't yet spread into the region. Iron had replaced stone, bronze and copper as the main substance for industry by the 10th century BCE, before most of Europe or even areas of the Middle East.

=== Koban culture ===
The Koban culture (the Iron Age) was the most advanced culture in Chechnya before recorded history, and also the most well-known. It first appeared between 1100 and 1000 BCE. The most well-studied site was on the outskirts of Serzhen-Yurt, which was a major center from around the eleventh to the seventh centuries BCE.

The remains include dwellings, cobble bridges, altars, iron objects, bones, and clay and stone objects. There were sickles and stone grain grinders. Grains that were grown included wheat, rye and barley. Cattle, sheep, goats, donkeys, pigs and horses were kept. There were shops, where artisans worked on and sold pottery, stone-casting, bone-carving, and stone-carving. There is evidence of an advanced stage of metallurgy. There was differentiation of professionals organized within clans. Jaimoukha argues that while all these cultures probably were made by people included among the genetic ancestors of the Chechens, it was either the Koban or Kharachoi culture that was the first culture made by the cultural and linguistic ancestors of the Chechens (meaning the Chechens first arrived in their homeland 3000–4000 years ago). However, the majority of historians disagree, holding the Chechens to have lived in their present-day lands for over 10000 years.

== Theories on origins ==
=== Migration from the Fertile Crescent c. 10000–8000 BCE ===
Johanna Nichols holds that the Nakh were descended from extremely ancient migrations from the Fertile Crescent to the Caucasus, perhaps due to population or political pressures back in the Fertile Crescent.

== Ancient ==
Georgian historian Giorgi Melikishvili posited that although there was evidence of Nakh settlement in the Southern Caucasus areas, this did not rule out the possibility that they also lived in the North Caucasus.

=== Invasion of the Cimmerians ===
In the 6th and 7th centuries BC, two waves of invaders—first the Cimmerians, who then rode south and crushed Urartu, and then the Scythians, who displaced them —greatly destabilized the Nakh regions. This became a recurring pattern in Chechen history: invasion from the north by highly mobile plains people, met with fierce and determined resistance by the Chechens, who usually started out losing but then reversed the tide.

=== Invasion of the Scythians ===
The Scythians started to invade the Caucasus in the 6th century BC, trought to have originated in modern Kazakhstan and the Lower Volga region. The Cimmerians had already pushed the Nakh south somewhat off the plains, and the Scythians forced them into the mountains. Vainakh presence in Chechnya on the Terek almost completely vanished for a while, and Scythians penetrated as far south as the Sunzha. Considering that the Nakh were dependent on the rivers for their very survival, this was a desperate situation. However, soon, Vainakh settlement reappeared on the Terek in Chechnya. In some areas, the Scythians even penetrated into the mountains themselves. In the 5th century BC, Herodotus noted that Scythian control included modern Chechnya.

After the first wave of Scythian assaults, the Nakh began returning to the fertile lowland plains and ousting the invaders, but new waves of Scythians (Sarmatians) arrived, pushing them back into the mountains. Some of the names of tributaries of the Sunzha and Terek rivers make reference to the fierce conflict for control of the rivers: the Valerik (or the Valarg) meant "the dead" in Nakh and the Martan came from a Sarmatian root and meant "the river of the dead".

It is not known whether this was the first dominant presence of the Ossetians in their modern territory or whether the primary population was still Zygii/Nakh and that it was only after the later Sarmatian invasion that Scythian people became dominant. Amjad Jaimoukha, notably, supports the hypothesis that the Ossetians were the product of multiple migrations. Thus, if this is the case, then the Scythians settled roughly North Ossetia, effectively cutting the Zygii nation in half (Herodotus and Strabo noted that Zygii were still present west of the Scythians in the Caucasus). The eastern half, then, became the Vainakhs. In other areas, Nakh-speaking peoples and other highlanders were eventually linguistically assimilated by the Alans and merged with them, eventually forming the Ossetian people.

There were various periods of good relations between the Scythians and the Nakh, where there was evidence of extensive cultural exchange. The Nakh were originally more advanced in material culture than the Sarmatians/Scythians, the latter having not known of the potter's wheel or foundry work, while the Sarmatians/Scythians originally had superior military skills and social stratification.

Even after the invasion of the Scythians, the Nakh managed to revitalize themselves after it receded. However, they were now politically fractured, with multiple kingdoms, and modern Ossetia, consistent with the theory that they were largely displaced and that Scythians had become dominant there. The Nakh nations in the North Caucasus were often inclined to look south and west for support to balance off the Scythians. The Vainakh in the east had an affinity to Georgia, while the Malkh Kingdom of the west looked to the new Greek kingdom of Bosporus on the Black Sea coast (though it may have also had relations with Georgia as well). Adermalkh, king of the Malkh state, married the daughter of the Bosporan king in 480 BCE. Malkhi is one of the Chechen tukkhums.

Hostilities continued for a long time. In 458 AD, the Nakh allied themselves with the Georgian King Vakhtang Gorgasali as he led a campaign against the Sarmatians, in retribution for their raids.

Eventually, relations between the Sarmatians and the Nakh normalized. The Alans formed the multi-ethnic state of Alania, which included a number Nakh tribes despite its center being Sarmatian-speaking.

=== Durdzuks in the Georgian Chronicles and the Armenian Chronicles ===
According to the Life of Qartli, the ancestors of the modern Chechens and Ingush were known as Durdzuks. Before his death, Targamos [Togarmah] divided the country amongst his sons, with Kavkasos [Caucas], the eldest and most noble, receiving the Central Caucasus. Kavkasos engendered the Chechen tribes, and his descendant, Durdzuk, who took residence in a mountainous region, later called "Dzurdzuketia" after him, established a strong state in the fourth and third centuries BC. Among the Chechen teips, the teip Zurzakoy (ru:Зурзакой), consonant with the ethnonym Dzurdzuk, live in the Itum-Kale region of Chechnya. In 1926, on the Vashndar river in the Argun gorge of Chechnya, there was a Chechen aul (rural settlement) Zurzuk, now a tract southeast of the village of Ulus-Kert.

The Armenian Chronicles mention that the Durdzuks defeated Scythians and became a significant power in the region in the first millennium BC. They allied themselves with Georgia, and helped Georgian King Farnavaz, the first king of Iberia (Kartli) consolidate his reign against his unruly vassals. The alliance with Georgia was cemented when King Farnavaz married a Durdzuk princess.

== Medieval ==
During the Middle Ages, the majority of the ancestors of the modern Vainakh are thought to have mostly lived along rivers and in between ridges, in their current ethnic territory. All the valleys in the upper reaches of the Argun, Assa, Darial and Fontanga saw the construction of complex stone architectures such as castles, shrines, churches, burial vaults and towers.

The main body of various Nakh tribes were surrounded by Georgians to the south, Alans to the north and west with Khazars beyond them, and various Dagestani peoples to the east. Those Nakh peoples who were in Georgia assimilated into Georgian society. The Nakh on the northern side of the Greater Caucasus mountains, ancestors of the Chechens and Ingush, saw some southern tribes adopt Christianity due to Georgian influence in the fifth and sixth centuries, but they remained separate from Georgia. Instead, the areas that now make up Ingushetia and Chechnya were either ruled by Khazars, by Alans, or ruled by independent Vainakh states such as Durdzuketia and Simsir.

=== Politics and trade ===
By the early medieval ages, Vainakh society had become stratified into a feudal order, with a king and vassals. The Vainakh state was variously called Durdzuketia (or Dzurdzuketia) by the Georgians or Simsir by others, though they may not have been exactly similar. The origin of the more modern egalitarianism among the Vainakh is much later, after the end of the conflict with the Mongols, when the Vainakh eventually grew tired of the excesses of their feudal rulers and overthrew them (see Ichkeria section), establishing what Turkic peoples called Ichkeria.

At various times Vainakh came under the rule of the Sarmatian-speaking Alans to their west and Khazars to their north, in both cases as vassals or as allies depending on time period. In times of complete independence, they nonetheless tried to have strong bonds of friendship with these countries both for trade and military purposes. The Vainakh also forged strong links with Georgia for mutual protection as well as trade, and these were initially in the context of the threat of an Arab invasion (as happened to Caucasian Albania) in the 8th century. The contribution of the Vainakh to fending off Arab designs on the Caucasus was critical.

The Vainakhs were also engaged in much trade as per their geographical position with long range trade partners (long range for the time period). Excavations have shown the presence of coins and other currency from Mesopotamia in the Middle East, including an eagle cast in Iraq (found in Ingushetia) and buried treasure containing 200 Arabian silver dirhams from the 9th century in northern Chechnya.

=== Religion ===
Until the 16th century, Chechens and Ingush were mostly pagans, practicing the Vainakh religion, with a sizable minority of Orthodox Christians. From the 8th to 13th centuries (i.e., before Mongol invasions of Durdzuketia), there was a mission of Georgian Orthodox missionaries to the Nakh peoples. Their success was limited, though a couple of highland teips did convert (conversion was largely by teip). However, during the Mongol invasions, these Christianized teips gradually reverted to paganism, perhaps due to the loss of trans-Caucasian contacts as the Georgians fought the Mongols and briefly fell under their dominion.

=== Durdzuketia and Simsir ===
During the Middle Ages, two states evolved in Chechnya that were run by Vainakhs. The first was Durdzuketia, which consisted of the highlands of modern Chechnya, Ingushetia, and parts of central Chechnya and Ingushetia. It was a vassal of Georgia, and had heavy Georgian influence, permeating in its writing, in its culture and even in religion. Christianity was introduced from Georgia in the 10th century and became, briefly, the official religion, despite the fact that most of the people remained pagan. Georgian script was also adopted, though it has been mostly lost by now. Durdzuketia was destroyed by the Mongol invasions.

Simsir was a Kingdom, and unlike Durdzuketia, it frequently switched around its alliances. Despite common ethnic heritage with Durdzuketia, it was not always linked to its southern neighbor, although it was in certain periods. Simsir at its peak stretched from North Ossetia to Dagestan and the northern part of Azerbaijan, including a small part of Georgia.It soon allied itself with the Golden Horde and adopted Islam afterwards. However, this proved to be a mistake as the alliance bound it to war with Tamerlane, who invaded and destroyed it.

== Mongol invasions ==
During the 13th century, the Mongols and their Turkic vassals launched long and massive invasions of the territory of modern Chechnya (then the Georgian allied Vainakh kingdom of Durdzuketia). They caused massive destruction and human death for the Durdzuks, but also greatly shaped the people they became afterward. The ancestors of the Chechens bear the distinction of being one of the few peoples to successfully resist the Mongols, not once, but twice, but this came at great cost to them, as their state was utterly destroyed.

These invasions are among the most significant occurrences in Chechen history, and have had long-ranging effects on Chechnya and its people. The determination to resist the Mongols and survive as Vainakh at all costs cost much hardship on the part of ordinary people. There is much folklore on this among the modern Chechen and Ingush. One particular tale recounts how the former inhabitants of Argun and the surrounding area held a successful defense (waged by men, women, and children) of the slopes of Mount Tebulosmta during the First Mongol Invasion, before returning to reconquer their home region.

Fierce resistance did not prevent the utter destruction of the state apparatus of Durdzuketia, however. Pagan sanctuaries as well as the Orthodox Churches in the south were utterly destroyed. Under the conditions of the invasion, Christianity (already originally highly dependent on connections with Georgia) was unable to sustain itself in Durdzuketia, and as its sanctuaries and priests fell, those who had converted reverted to paganism for spiritual needs. Historical documents were also destroyed in mass amounts. Within a few years of the invasion, Durdzuketia was history– but its resistant people were not. Even more disastrously, the Mongols successfully established control over much of the Sunzha river– thus posing an existential threat to the Durdzuk people due to their need for the Sunzha's (as well as the Terek's) agriculture to support their population. The feudal system of vassals and lords also fell into shambles.

The utter destruction of the Vainakh's statehood, their lifestyle (and in the south, their religion), and much of their knowledge of history caused them to rebuild their culture in a number of ways. The population developed various methods of resistance and much of their later lifestyle during the resistance to the Mongols and in between the two wars. The clan system mapped onto battlefield organization. Guerrilla tactics using mountains and forests were perfected. It was during the Mongol invasions that the military defense towers that one associates today with the Vainakh population (see Nakh architecture) came into being. A number of them served simultaneously as homes, as sentry posts, and as fortresses from which one could launch spears, arrows, etc. The contribution of men, women, and children of all classes, paired with the destruction of the feudal system during the war, rich and poor, also helped the Vainakh develop a strong sense of egalitarianism, which was one of the major causes of the revolt against their new lords after the end of the Mongol invasions.

== Modern era ==
=== Post-Mongol era transition ===
After defending the highlands, the Vainakh attacked Mongol control of the lowlands. Much of this area still had nominal Vainakh owners (as per the clan system which acknowledges the ownership of a piece of land by a certain teip), even after generations upon generations of not living there. Much territory was retaken, only to be lost again due to the Second Mongol Invasion. After that, the Vainakh managed to take most (but not all) of their former holdings on the Sunzha, but most of the Terek remained in Kipchak hands. The conflicts did not stop, however, as there were clans that had ownership of lands now inhabited by Turkic peoples, meaning that if they did not retake the lands, they would lack their own territory and be forever reliant on the laws of hospitality of other clans, doing great damage to their honor. Conflicts between Vainakh and Turkic peoples originated from the Mongol invasions when Chechens were driven out of the Terek and Sunzha rivers by Turco-Mongolian invaders and continued as late as the 1750s and 1770s. After that, the conflict was with newer arrivals in northern Chechnya: the Cossacks.

The large-scale return of Vainakh from the mountains to the plains began in the early 15th century (i.e., right after the end of the Second Mongol Invasion) and was completed at the beginning of the 18th century (by which point the invasion of Chechnya by Cossacks was approaching). The Nogais were driven north, and some of those who stayed behind (as well as some Kumyks) may have been voluntarily assimilated by the Chechens, becoming the Chechen clans of Turkic origin.

Although the Chechens now reoccupied the northern Chechen plains, the lords of the Kumyks and Kabardins sought to rule over their lands just as they had attempted to do (with varying success) with the Nogais in the area. The Kabardins established rule over the Ingush clans, but the Kumyks found the plains Chechens to be rebellious subjects, who only grudgingly acknowledged their rule. In the lands of central and southern Chechnya, Chechens from around the Sunzha, who had advanced socially, economically and technologically much more than their highland counterparts, established their own feudal rule. The feudal rulers were called byachi, or military chieftains. However, this feudalism, whether by Kumyks, Avars, Kabardins or Chechens, was widely resented by the Chechens, and the spread of gunpowder and guns allowed for a massive revolution to occur.

=== Ichkeria ===

The name Ичкерия (Ičkérija) comes from the river Iskark in south-eastern Chechnya. The term was mentioned first as "Iskeria" in a Russian document by Colonel Pollo from 1836.

The illesh, or epic legends, tell of conflicts between the Chechens and their Kumyk and Kabardin overlords. The Chechens apparently overthrew both their own overlords and the foreign ones, using the widespread nature of the guns among the populace to their advantage. As Jaimoukha puts it, "based on the trinity of democracy, liberty and equality", feudalism was abolished and the "tukkhum-taip" legal system was put into place, with the laws of adat introduced. The "tukkhum-taip" system had democratic aspects with the strong role of local courts and teips (roughly, clans) functioning as provinces, with representatives being elected by teip as well as by region.

In a January 1800 report to Emperor Paul I, Russian Lieutenant-General Carl Heinrich von Knorring stated that Chechen settlements and territories extended along a massive front of "up to 200 versts from the Sunzha River to the shores of the Caspian Sea".

== Ottoman-Persian rivalry and the Russian Empire ==
The onset of Russian expansionism to the south in the direction of Chechnya began with Ivan the Terrible's conquest of Astrakhan. Russian influence started as early as the 16th century when Ivan the Terrible constructed a fort in Tarki in 1559 where the first Cossack army became stationed. The Russian Terek Cossack Host was secretly established in lowland Chechnya in 1577 by free Cossacks resettled from Volga River Valley to the Terek River Valley. With the new Cossack hosts settled in the proximity of the North Caucasian peoples and with the rivaling Ottoman and Persian empires from the south, the region would for the next few centuries be contested between the three, with Russia emerging as victorious only in the late 19th century, after multiple victorious wars against Iran, Turkey, and the native Caucasian peoples later on.

=== Ottoman-Safavid and later Ottoman-Persian-Russian rivalry in the Caucasus ===
Beginning in the late 15th and early 16th centuries, the Ottoman and Safavid empires started to fight for influence over the Caucasus. A number of Caucasian peoples grew wary of both sides and attempted to play one side off against the other. The rivalry was embodied by both the struggle between Sunni and Shia Islam and the regional conflict of the two empires. Originally, relations with Russia were seen as a possible balance to the Ottoman and Safavid empires, and a pro-Russian camp in Chechen politics formed (there were also pro-Ottoman and pro-Persian camps; each viewed their favored empire as the least bad of the three). In reality, the most favored empire from the beginning was the Ottoman Empire, but that did not mean the Chechens were not wary of a potential Ottoman attempt at conquering them. Any hope toward positive relations with Russia ended in the late 18th and early 19th centuries when tensions with the Cossacks escalated and Russia began trying to conquer the Caucasus, starting with Georgia. After this point, multiple Chechens sealed, forever, their preference towards Istanbul against Isfahan and Moscow by converting to Sunni Islam in an attempt to win the sympathy of the Ottomans. However, they were too late – the Ottoman Empire was already well into its period of decline and collapse, but it was no longer able to even maintain its own state. Hence, the rivalry between Turkey and Persia became more and more abstract and meaningless as the threat of conquest by Russia and being pushed out of their lands or even annihilated by the Cossacks grew and grew.

==== Arrival of the Cossacks ====
The Cossacks, however, had settled in the lowlands just a bit off from the Terek river. This area, now around Naurskaya and Kizlyar was an area of dispute between the Mongols' Turkic vassals and their successors (the Nogais) and the Chechens. The mountainous highlands of Chechnya were economically dependent on the lowlands for food produce, and the lowlands just north of the Terek river were considered part of the Chechen lowlands. The Cossacks were much more assertive than the Nogais (who quickly became vassals to the Tsar), and they soon replaced the Nogais as the regional rival. This marked the beginning of Russo-Chechen conflict, if the Cossacks are to be considered Russian. The Cossacks and Chechens would periodically raid each other's villages, and seek to sabotage each other's crops, though there were also long periods without violence.

Nonetheless, the Chechen versus Cossack conflict has continued to the modern day. It was a minor theme in the works of Leo Tolstoy (who managed to be sympathetic both to the Chechens and to the Cossacks). While the Chechens and Ingush primarily backed the anti-Tsarist forces in the Russian Revolution, because of this, and the threat to the Decossackization policies of the Bolsheviks, the Terek Cossacks almost universally filed into the ranks of Anton Denikin's anti-Soviet, highly nationalistic Volunteer Army.

The habit of raids done by the Chechens (and to a lesser extent Ingush) against Cossacks, by the 20th century, had more or less become a cultural tradition. Both hatred of the oppressor (Chechens generally failed to see the distinction between Russian and Cossack, and to this day they may be used as synonyms) and the need to either fill the mouths of hungry children and to regain lost lands played a role. The Chechen raiders, known as abreks, were the focal point of this conflict and are almost symbolic of the two different viewpoints. The Russian view of the abreks is that they were simple mountain bandits, a typical example of Chechen barbarism (often compared to Russian "civilization," with general colonialist racist vocabulary); they were depicted as rapists and murderers by Russian authors. The Chechen view is that they were heroes of valor, much like Robin Hood. As Moshe Gammer points out in his book Lone Wolf and Bear, Soviet ideology fell somewhere in between the two views- and notably, one such abrek, Zelimkhan, was deified.

=== Russo-Persian Wars and Caucasian Wars ===
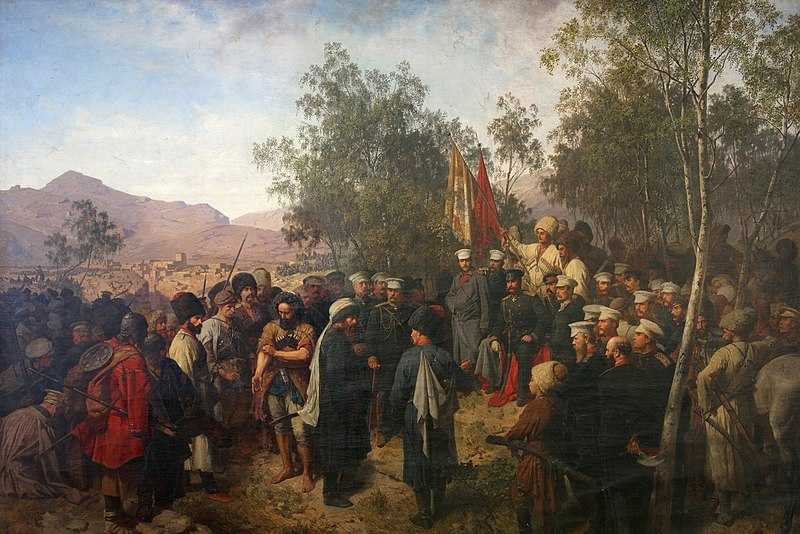
Captured Imam Shamil before the commander-in-chief Prince Baryatinsky on 25 August 1859; painting by Theodor Horschelt

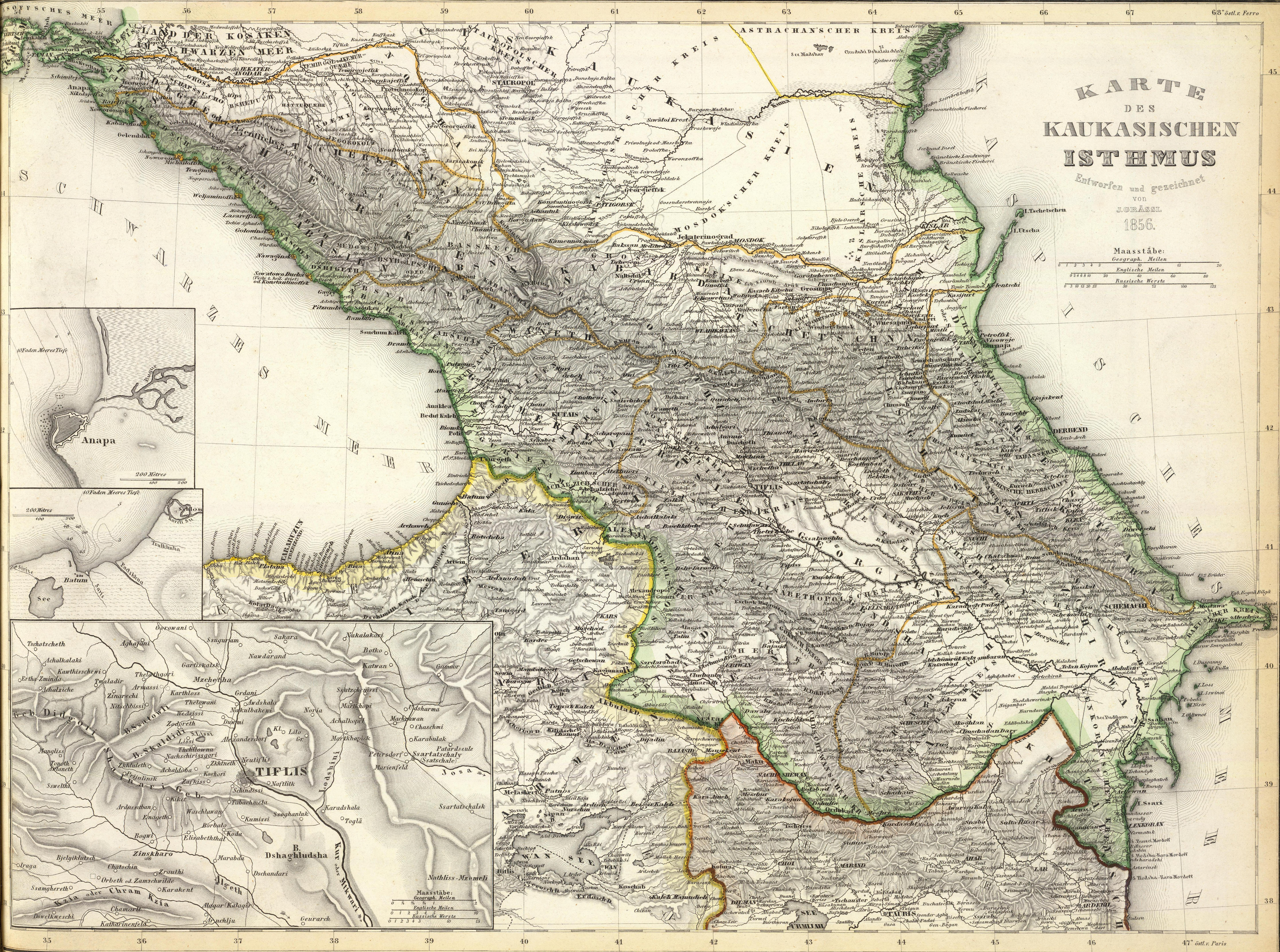
Map of the Caucasian Isthmus by J. Grassl, 1856.

As Russia set off for the first time to increase its political influence in the Caucasus and the Caspian Sea at the expense of Safavid Persia, Peter I launched the Russo-Persian War (1722-1723), in which Russia succeeded in taking much of the Caucasian territories from Iran for several years.

As the Russians took control of the Caspian corridor and moved into Persian ruled Dagestan, Peters' forces ran into mountain tribes. Peter sent a cavalry force to subdue them, but the Chechens routed them. In 1732, after Russia already ceded back most of the Caucasus to Persia, now led by Nader Shah, following the Treaty of Resht, Russian troops were ambushed by Chechen rebels near a village called Chechen–Aul along the Argun River. The Russians were defeated again and withdrew, but this battle is responsible for the apocryphal story about how the Nokhchiy came to be known as "Chechens" – the people ostensibly named for the place the battle had taken place at. The ethnonym Chechen was, however, already in use as early as 1692.

In 1783, Russia and the eastern Georgian kingdom of Kartl-Kakheti signed Treaty of Georgievsk. Kartli-Kakheti, led by Erekle II, seeing that Persia was trying to put Georgia again under Persian rule, urged for the treaty which he hoped would guarantee Russian protection in the future. However, this did not prevent Persia which had been ruling Georgia intermittently since 1555, now led by Agha Mohammad Khan of the Qajar dynasty, from sacking Tbilisi in 1795, and regaining full control over Georgia. This act gave Russia the direct option to push deeper into the Caucasus per the signed treaty with Georgia.

The spread of Islam was largely aided by Islam's association with resistance against Russian encroachment from the 16th to the 19th centuries.

=== Conquest ===
In order to secure communications with Georgia and other future regions of the Transcaucasia, the Russian Empire began spreading its influence into the Caucasus mountains. The Chechens were actually first drawn into conflict with Russia when Russia attacked the Kumyks (and established the fort of Kizlyar), whom the Chechens were allied to. Russia's Cossacks became imperial extensions and Russia sent its own soldiers to meet the escalating conflict (which was no longer simply between Russian and Kumyk). It soon met with fierce resistance from the mountain peoples. The Russians incorporated a strategy of driving the Chechens into the mountains, out of their lowland (relative) food source, thus forcing them to either starve or surrender. They were willing to do neither. The Chechens moved to retake the lowlands: in 1785, a holy war was declared on the Russians by Sheikh Mansur, who was captured in 1791 and died a few years later. Nonetheless, expansion into the region, usually known at this point as Ichkeria, or occasionally Mishketia (probably coming from Kumyk or Turkish; also rendered Mitzjeghia, etc.), was stalled due to the persistence of Chechen resistance.

Following the incorporation of neighbouring Dagestan into the empire after its forced ceding by Persia in 1803–1813 following the Russo-Persian War (1804–1813) and the outcoming Treaty of Gulistan, Imperial Russian forces under Aleksey Yermolov began moving into highland Chechnya in 1830 to secure Russia's borders with Persia. Another successful Caucasus war against Persia several years later, starting in 1826 and ending in 1828 with the Treaty of Turkmenchay, and a successful war against Ottoman Turkey in 1828 enabled Russia to use a much larger portion of its army in subdueing the natives of the North Caucasus.

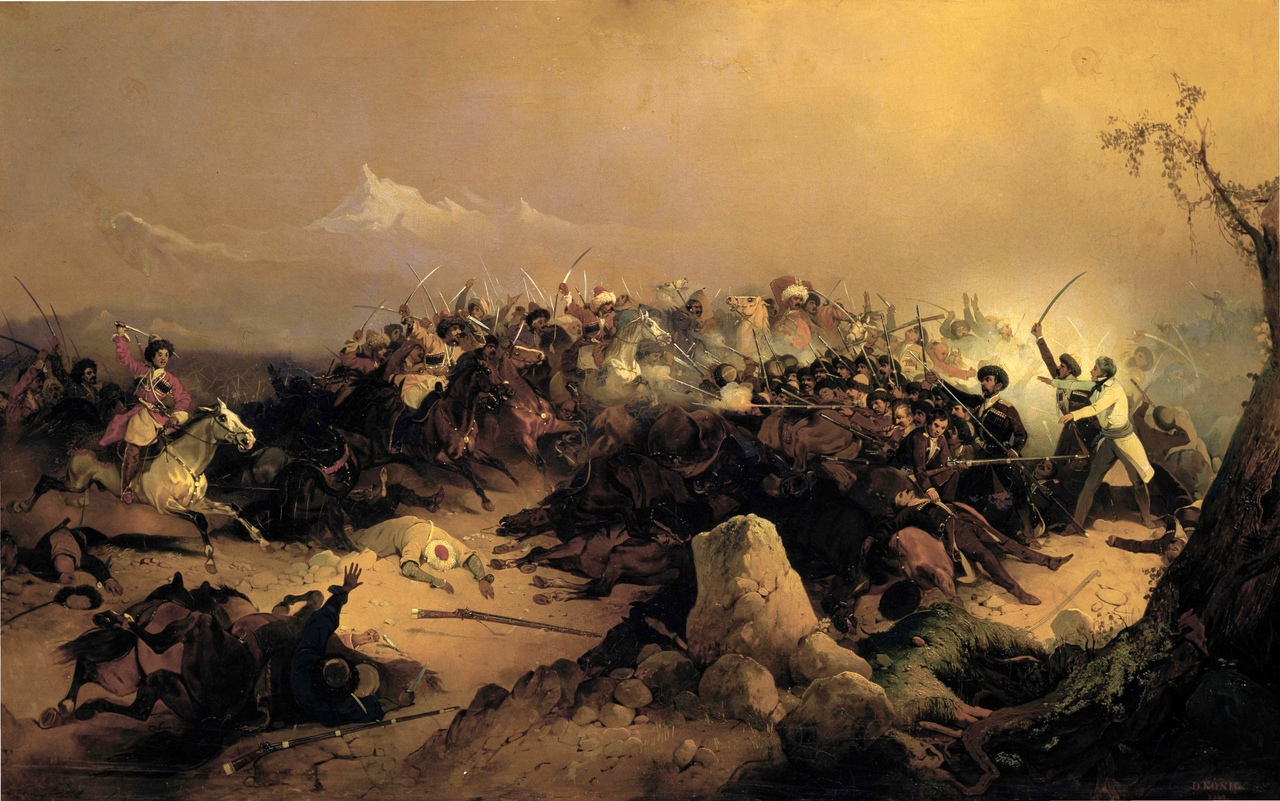
Fight with the Chechens under Akbulat-Yurt by D. Koenig (1849).

In the course of the prolonged Caucasian War, the Chechens, along with other peoples of the eastern Caucasus, united into the Caucasian Imamate and resisted fiercely, led by the Dagestani commanders Ghazi Mohammed, Hamzat Bek and Imam Shamil (for military details, see Murid War). While their program of united resistance to Russian conquest was popular, uniting Ichkeria/Mishketia with Dagestan was not necessarily (see Shamil's page), especially as some Chechens still practiced the indigenous religion, most Chechen Muslims belonged to heterodox Sufi Muslim teachings (divided between Qadiri and Naqshbandiya, with a strong Qadiri majority), rather than the more orthodox Sunni Islam of Dagestan; and finally, the rule of Ichkeria by a foreign ruler not only spurred distrust, but also threatened the existence of Ichkeria's indigenous "taip-conference" government structure. Thus, Shamil was regarded by a number of Chechens as simply being the lesser evil. Shamil was an Avar who practiced a form of Islam that was largely foreign to Chechnya, and in the end, he ended up happy in Russian custody, demonstrating furthermore his lack of compatibility with the leadership of the cause. Worse still, he presented his cause not as a fight for freedom, but also as a fight to purify Islam, and aimed a number of his criticisms at fellow Avars as well as Chechen leaders and non-Avar Dagestani leaders. The Chechens, as well as multiple Dagestanis, fought on even after his defeat, undaunted. In addition to failing to win the sincere support of not only the Chechens, but also the Ingush, and multiple Dagestani peoples, Shamil also was thwarted in his goal of uniting east Caucasian and west Caucasian resistance (Circassians, Abkhaz, etc.), especially given the conditions of the Crimean War. A major reason for this failure was Russia's success in convincing the Ossetes to take their side in the conflict, who followed the same religion (Orthodox Christianity) as them. The Ossetes, living right in between the Ingush and the Circassian federation, blocked all contacts between the two theaters of war.

Chechnya was finally absorbed into the Russian Empire in 1859 after Shamil's capture. Imam Shamil, among modern Chechens, is alternately glorified and demonized: his memory is evoked as someone who successfully held off Russian conquest, but on the other hand, he ruled Ichkeria heavy-handedly, and was an Avar who worked mainly for the interest of his own people. Nonetheless, the name Shamil is popular among Chechens, largely due to his legacy.

The Russian generals had a special hatred of Chechens, the most bold and stubborn nation with the most aggravating (for the Russians) guerrilla battlefield tactics. Yermolov stated once that he would "never rest until [only] one Chechen is left alive". In 1949, Soviet authorities erected a statue of 19th-century Russian general Aleksey Yermolov in Grozny. The inscription read, "There is no people under the sun more vile and deceitful than this one". As Caucasian historian Charles King points, the methods used by the Russians would today be called genocidal warfare. An example of these tactics (in fact recorded in this case by a Russian officer) by the Russian army and the Cossacks went like this:

At this moment, General Krukovskii, with saber drawn, sent the Cossacks forward to the enemies' houses. Many, but not all, managed to save themselves by running away; the Cossacks and the militia seized those who remained and the slaughter began, with the Chechens, like anyone with no hope of survival, fought to their last drop of blood. Making a quick work of the butchery, the ataman [Cossack commander] gave out a cry and galloped on to the gorge, toward the remaining villages where the majority of the population was concentrated.

The long and brutal war caused a prolonged wave of emigration until the end of the 19th century, involving hundreds of thousands of Chechens. According to such estimates (Jaimoukha cites the earlier historian A. Rogov), there were as many as 1.5 million Chechens in the North Caucasus in 1847 (and probably more before that, as there had already been much fighting and destruction by that point), but by 1861 there were only 140,000 remaining in the Caucasus. By 1867, after the wave of expulsions, there were only 116,000 Chechens. Hence, in those 20 years, the number of Chechens decreased by 1,384,000 (or 92.3%).

In the 1860s, Russia commenced with forced emigration as well to ethnically cleanse the region. Although Circassians were the main (and most notorious) victims, the expulsions also gravely affected other peoples in the region. Lowland Chechens as well were evicted in large numbers, and while a number of them came back, the former Chechen Lowlands lacked their historical Chechen populations for a long period until Chechens were settled in the region during their return from their 1944–1957 deportation to Siberia. The Arshtins, at that time a (debatably) separate people, were completely wiped out as a distinct group: according to official documents, 1366 Arshtin families disappeared (i.e. either fled or were killed) and only 75 families remained. These 75 families, realizing the impossibility of existing as a nation of only hundreds of people, joined (or rejoined) the Chechen nation as the Erstkhoi tukkhum.

=== Post-conquest ===
As Chechens fled and were deported to Turkey, Terek Cossacks and Armenians settled in Chechnya. The presence of Cossacks in particular was resented deeply by the Chechens. Alongside another Russo-Turkish War, the 1877 "Lesser Gazavat" saw the 22-year-old Vainakh imam Ali Bek-Haji rise alongside a rebellion of Avars under Haji Mohammed in Daghestan. The main Chechen force was dispersed by Russian heavy artillery at Mayrtup on 3 May and the leadership was surrounded by November. In December, Ali Bek-Haji and his naibs surrendered upon Russian promises of amnesty but 23 of the 28 were hanged by March 1878. Georgian scholar George Anchabadze noted that this coincided with a major Abkhazian revolt, and is comparable to various earlier mass revolts in the South Caucasus by Georgians, Abkhaz, Transcaucasian Avars, Azeris, Talysh, and Lezghins. All these revolts drew their force from the mass opposition of the population to the brutality and exploitation of Russian colonialist rule (even among peoples like Georgians, Azeris and Talysh who had originally been incorporated relatively easily), and used similar guerrilla tactics. In the aftermath of the uprising, however, a number of Chechens were dispossessed or exiled to Siberia in favor of local collaborators such as the Cossacks. They subsequently abandoned open gazavat ("jihad") until the 1917 revolutions.

By the end of the 19th century, major oil deposits were discovered around Grozny (1893) which along with the arrival of the railroad (early 1890s), brought economic prosperity to the region (then administered as part of the Terek Oblast) for the oil-mining Russian colonists. The immigration of colonists from Russia brought about a three-way distinction between Chechens and Ingush on one hand, Cossacks on a second, and "other-towners" (inogorodtsy), namely Russians and Ukrainians, who came to work as laborers. A debatable fourth group, including Armenian bankers and richer Russians, and even some rich Chechens (such as Chermoev), arose later.

=== Emergence of European-styled nationalism ===
During the late 1860s and 1870s (just 10 years after the incorporation of Chechnya into the Tsarist Empire), the Chechens underwent a national reawakening in the European sense of the term. The conflict with Russia and its final incorporation into the empire, however, brought about the formation of a modern, European, nationalist identity of Chechens, though it ironically solidified their separation, mainly over politics, from the Ingush. The nation was held to be all-important, trumping religion, political belief, or any other such distinction. In 1870, Chakh Akhiev wrote a compilation of Chechen and Ingush fairy tales (called "Chechen fairytales"). In 1872, Umalat Laudaev, an early Chechen nationalist, recorded the contemporary customs of the Chechens. Following in his footsteps, Chakh Akhiev did the same for their "brothers", the Ingush, the following year.

Other notable early Chechen nationalists included Akhmetkhan, Ibraghim Sarakayev, Ismail Mutushev. Later imperial Chechen nationalists include the five Sheripov brothers, among others. Akhmetkhan and Danilbek Sheripov were notably democratic-minded writers, while Danilbek's younger brother, Aslanbek, would adopt communism.

=== World War I ===
During World War I, Chechens fought for the Imperial Russian Army. In 1916, members of the Checheno-Ingush Cavalry Regiment routed members of the German Iron Regiment, and received a personal thanks from Tsar Nicholas II.

In a report on 5 August 1914, the German Chief of Staff stressed the importance of inciting rebellions among Caucasian Muslims.

== Soviet Union ==
=== During the Russian Civil War ===
During the Russian Civil War, the Northern Caucasus switched hands several times between Denikin's Volunteer Army, the Bolshevik Red Army and the Mountainous Republic of the Northern Caucasus, which eventually allied with the Bolsheviks as they promised them greater autonomy and self-rule.

Initially, the Chechens, like other Caucasians, looked positively upon communism. The indigenous Chechen systems and culture led them to place a high value on equality, and communists promised an end to imperialism (and especially Tsarist rule), making them even more attractive. Furthermore, the majority of Chechens lived in poverty. As was also the case for other Georgians, the cultural tolerance and anti-imperialist rhetoric of communism was what made it so appealing to Chechens (and so terrifying for Cossacks). A number of Sufi priests, despite communism's contempt for religion, filed into the ranks of the communists as they felt that preserving the morals of their religion (including equality, which the communists stood for) was more important than its practice.

However, like other peoples, divisions arose among the Chechens. The differentiation between classes had by now arisen (or re-arisen) and notably, alliances between the Russians (and other "inogorodtsy") were also splintered. This, combined with the ethnic division of Chechnya between the natives as well as other non-Christian minorities, the "old colonists" (i.e., Cossacks) and the "recent colonists" (non-Cossack Russians), and the political divisions among each group, led to a complicated conflict pitting multiple different forces against each other. At only one year into the conflict, five distinct forces with separate interests had formed with influence in Chechnya: the Terek Cossacks, the "Bourgeois" Chechens following Tapa Chermoev, the Qadiri Communist-Islamists under Ali Mitayev, the urban Russian Bolsheviks in Groznyi, and lastly, the relatively insignificant Naqshbandis with loyalties to Islamists in Dagestan.

In response to the February Revolution, the Bolsheviks seized power in the city of Grozny, their stronghold in Chechnya. Meanwhile, a "Civil Executive Committee" was formed in the Terek district by a group of native "bourgeoisie". It notably included the Chechen oil-magnate Tapa Chermoev in its structures. The Civil Executive Committee was a multi-national organ and included people from a number of the ethnic groups of the Caucasus. It nominally accepted the authority of the provisional government in Moscow, but explicitly stated its goal of securing autonomy. A third force, the Terek Cossacks, began organizing to resist the Bolsheviks who had taken control of Grozny (as well as some other cities in the Caucasus). To make matters even more confusing, a group of Naqshbandi Islamists in Dagestan organized under the sheikh and livestock breeder Najmuddin of Hotso and declared a muftiate of the North Caucasus in the summer of 1917, supposedly a successor state to Shamil's Caucasus Imamate. The Chechen Qadiri sheikh, Ali Mitayev, a "Communist-Islamist" who believed that Communism was compatible with Qadiri-Sunni Islam, set up a Chechen National Soviet. Mitayev shared the communist ideals of the Russian Bolsheviks in Groznyi, but insisted on Chechen national autonomy as well. As the scenario progressed, Chermoev and the rest of the Civil Executive Committee would temporarily set aside their disdain for the Naqshbandi Islamists and persuade Najmuddin to serve in their government, which evolved from the Civil Executive Committee into a Mountain Republic.

At this point, the clash was between the Whites and the indigenous peoples who opposed them. The Ossetes and Cossacks sided with the Whites, whereas everyone else fought them. This therefore made Bolshevism the lesser evil or even a strong ally against the Whites. The originally reluctant support of the Bolsheviks soon became firm after the Whites began committing massacres against Chechen villages. Tapa Chermoev became the ruler of the Chechen constituent to the "Mountain Republic". Chermoev ironically allied himself with the Cossacks against the inogorodtsy, who seized power briefly in early 1917. Chermoev and the other major figures among the Mountain Republic sought to incorporate the Cossacks (establishing what would have been essentially the first friendly relations between Chechens and Cossacks- unsurprisingly, the uneasy alliance soon gave way). A Chechen National Soviet was set up under Ali Mitayev. Dagestani Islamists tried to establish the North Caucasian Emirate and incorporate the Chechens, but the Chechens wanted nothing to do with them – one of the few things all Chechens, which even the Islamists agreed on (most Chechens were Qadiri, meaning they viewed the Naqshbandi with contempt).

The alliance between the Caucasians and the Cossacks soon disintegrated as the threat posed by the inogorodtsy receded. Chechens and Ingush demanded a return of the lands they had been robbed of in the previous century, and the Chermoev government, increasingly revealed as without any control over its land, despite opposing this (and in doing so, losing the support of its main constituents), was powerless to stop them. Chechens stormed North to reclaim the northern parts of their homeland, and land-hungry, impoverished Chechens revived the practice of attacking the Cossack stanitsas in order to feed their children. As the Chermoev government collapsed, Chechens allied, at least vocally, with the Mensheviks in Georgia, while the Cossacks tried to ally with the Bolsheviks, who, appealing to the Cossacks, referred to the Chechen's actions as being symptoms (unfathomably) of "racist bourgeois nationalism" (using bourgeois to refer to a practically impoverished people). However, the Cossacks did not have an affinity to the Bolsheviks, and when the Denikin's Whites appeared on the scene, their appeal to Cossacks as Russian patriots, and their contempt for non-Russians resonated strongly with the Cossacks.

The civil war dragged on, and Chechen hopes in the Mensheviks soon were dashed as the Mensheviks became increasingly weakened and lost control of the Northern regions of their own country. The Whites, with their Cossack and Ossetian allies, massacred village after village of Caucasians (it was then that the Georgians of North Ossetia, previously 1-2% of the population, were forced to flee and the rest completely massacred, by the Ossete Whites and Cossacks). The Bolsheviks appealed to the Caucasians (except the Georgians, who remained loyal to the Mensheviks, who they viewed as slowly becoming Georgian patriots), arguing that they now realized that the Cossacks who they had appealed to previously were merely imperial tools, and that, knowing this, they would back Caucasian demands all the way. The Chechens were desperate for any sort of help against the Cossacks, and wanted to reverse the cause of their perennial poverty – the loss of Northern Chechnya to the Cossacks – so they joined the Reds by the thousand.

Originally, the advancing Bolsheviks (who were also mainly ethnically Russian, like the Whites they defeated) were viewed as liberators. However, less than half a year after their arrival, rebellion on the part of the Chechens against the Bolsheviks flared up again, because it was discovered by the Chechens that "the Russian Bolsheviks were just a new kind of imperialist, in Communist disguise". Following the end of the conflict in 1921, the Chechnya-Ingushetia had been first made part of the Soviet Mountain Republic, and until it was disbanded in 1924 received the official status of an autonomous republic within the Soviet Union in 1936.

=== 1930s: Stalinist period ===
In the 1930s, Ukrainians fleeing the great famine known as the Holodomor came to Chechnya. As the result some of them settled in Chechen-Ingush ASSR on the permanent basis and were able to survive the famine.

The Chechen uprising of 1932 broke out in early 1932 and was defeated in March.

On 5 December 1936, an Autonomous Soviet Socialist Chechen-Ingush Republic was proclaimed.

=== Hassan Israilov's rebellion and World War II ===
Observing Finland's fight against Russia (the Winter War) caused the Chechens to begin to believe that it was then the time to achieve their long-desired liberation from the Russian yoke.

By February 1940, Hasan Israilov and his brother Hussein had established a guerrilla base in the mountains of south-eastern Chechnya, where they worked to organize a unified guerrilla movement to prepare an armed insurrection against the Soviets. In February 1940 Israilov's rebel army controlled territory in South and Central Checheno-Ingushetia. The rebel government was established in Galanchozh.

Israilov described his position on why they were fighting multiple times:

I have decided to become the leader of a war of liberation of my own people. I understand all too well that not only in Checheno-Ingushetia, but in all nations of the Caucasus it will be difficult to win freedom from the heavy yoke of Red imperialism. But our fervent belief in justice and our faith in the support of the freedom-loving peoples of the Caucasus and of the entire world inspire me toward this deed, in your eyes impertinent and pointless, but in my conviction, the sole correct historical step. The valiant Finns are now proving that the Great Enslaver Empire is powerless against a small but freedom-loving people. In the Caucasus you will find your second Finland, and after us will follow other oppressed peoples.

For twenty years now, the Soviet authorities have been fighting my people, aiming to destroy them group by group: first the kulaks, then the mullahs and the 'bandits', then the bourgeois-nationalists. I am sure now that the real object of this war is the annihilation of our nation as a whole. That is why I have decided to assume the leadership of my people in their struggle for liberation.

After the German invasion in the USSR in June 1941, the brothers organized large meetings in areas not yet taken to gather supporters. In some areas, up to 80% of men were involved in the insurrection. It is known that the Soviet Union used bombers against the rebels causing a large number of civilian casualties. In February 1942, Mairbek Sheripov organized rebellion in Shatoi, Khimokhk and tried to take Itum-Kale. Sheripov and Israilov joined forces soon and began taking control of areas of Western Dagestan. The insurrection caused Chechen and Ingush soldiers of the Red Army to desert. Some sources claim that total number of deserted mountaineer soldiers reached 62,750, exceeding the number of mountaineer fighters in the Red Army.

The Germans made concerted efforts to coordinate with Israilov. Germany sent saboteurs and aided the rebels at times with Abwehr's Nordkaukasische Sonderkommando Schamil, which was sent on the premise of saving the oil refinery in Grozny from destruction by the Red Army (which it accomplished). However, Israilov's refusal to cede control of his revolutionary movement to the Germans, and his continued insistence on German recognition of Chechen independence, led some Germans to consider Khasan Israilov as unreliable, and his plans unrealistic. Although the Germans were able to undertake covert operations in Chechnya—such as the sabotage of Grozny oil fields—attempts at a German-Chechen alliance floundered.

That the Chechens actually were allied to the Germans is highly questionable and usually dismissed as false. They did have contact with the Germans. However, there were profound ideological differences between the Chechens and the Nazis (self-determination versus imperialism), neither trusted the other. The Germans also courted the Cossacks, who were traditionally enemies of the Chechens. Mairbek Sheripov reportedly gave the Ostministerium a sharp warning that "if the liberation of the Caucasus meant only the exchange of one colonizer for another, the Caucasians would consider this [a theoretical fight pitting Chechens and other Caucasians against Germans] only a new stage in the national liberation war".

=== Operation Lentil/Aardakh ===
Operation Lentil began on 13 October 1943, when about 120,000 men were moved into the Republic of Checheno-Ingushetia by the Soviet government, supposedly for mending bridges. On 23 February 1944 (on Red Army day), the entire population was summoned to local party buildings where they were told they were going to be deported as punishment for their alleged collaboration with the Germans.

Some 40% to 50% of the deportees were children. Unheated and uninsulated freight cars were used. The inhabitants rounded up and imprisoned in Studebaker trucks and sent to Central Asia (Kazakhstan and Kyrgyzstan). Multiple times, resistance was met with slaughter, and in one such instance, in the aul of Khaibakh, about 700 people were locked in a barn and burned alive by NKVD general Gveshiani, who was praised for this and promised a medal by Lavrentiy Beria. People from remote villages were executed per Beria's verbal order that any Chechen or Ingush deemed 'untransportable should be liquidated' on the spot.

They combed the huts to make sure there was no one left behind... The soldier who came into the house did not want to bend down. He raked the hut with a burst from his tommy gun. Blood trickled out from under the bench where a child was hiding. The mother screamed and hurled herself at the soldier. He shot her too. There was not enough rolling stock. Those left behind were shot. The bodies were covered with earth and sand, carelessly. The shooting had also been careless, and people started wriggling out of the sand like worms. The NKVD men spent the whole night shooting them all over again.

By the next summer, Checheno-Ingushetia was dissolved; a number of Chechen and Ingush placenames were replaced with Russian ones; mosques and graveyards were destroyed, and a massive campaign of burning a number of historical Chechen texts was near complete (leaving the world depleted of what was more or less the only source of central Caucasian literature and historical texts except for sparse texts about the Chechens, Ingush, etc., not written by themselves, but by Georgians). Throughout the North Caucasus, about 700,000 (according to Dalkhat Ediev, 724,297, of which the majority, 479,478, were Chechens, along with 96,327 Ingush, 104,146 Kalmyks, 39,407 Balkars and 71,869 Karachais), died along the trip, and the harsh environment of Central Asia (especially considering the amount of exposure) killed many more.

The NKVD gives the statistic of 144,704 people killed in 1944–1948 alone (death rate of 23.5% per all groups), though this is dismissed by a number of authors such as Tony Wood, John Dunlop, Moshe Gammer and others as a far understatement. Estimates for deaths of the Chechens alone (excluding the NKVD statistic), range from about 170,000 to 200,000, thus ranging from over a third of the total Chechen population to nearly half being killed in those 4 years alone (rates for other groups for those four years hover around 20%). Although the Council of Europe has recognized it as a "genocidal act", no country except the self-declared, unrecognized Chechen Republic of Ichkeria officially recognizes the act as a genocide.

During the repression period (1944–1957), deported nations were not allowed to change places without special permit taken from local authority. Names of repressed nations were totally erased from all books and encyclopedias. Chechen-language libraries were destroyed, Chechen books and manuscripts were burned. Families were divided and not allowed to travel to each other even if they found out where their relatives were.

=== Chechnya after the deportation ===
The Checheno-Ingush ASSR was transformed into Grozny Oblast, which also included the Kizlyar District and Naursky raion from Stavropol Kray, and parts of it were given to North Ossetia (part of Prigorodny District), Georgian SSR and Dagestan ASSR. Much of the empty housing was given to refugees from war-raged Western Soviet Union. Abandoned houses were settled by newcomers, only Jews and Meskhetian Turks refused to settle in foreign houses, both of which groups had previously lived in the area. In 1949 Soviet authorities erected a statue of 19th-century Russian general Aleksey Yermolov in Grozny. The inscription read, "There is no people under the sun more vile and deceitful than this one."

Some of Chechen settlements were totally erased from maps and encyclopedia. This was how the aul of Khaibakh was rediscovered, through archaeological finds in Ukraine. Archaeologists have found the bodies of Caucasian scouts who died doing the job in the rear of the Nazi lines. In their pockets were found letters inscribing the name of the aul Khaibakh. When the scientists decided to inform the families of heroes that they have found their relatives, they learned that such settlement in Chechnya no longer exists. Continuing their investigation, they discovered the bitter truth about when soldiers from Chechnya died on the front, the relatives of theirs were burned alive in their homes by Soviet soldiers.

Many gravestones were destroyed (along with pretty much the whole library of Chechen medieval writing in Arabic and Georgian script about the land of Chechnya, its people, etc., leaving the modern Chechens and modern historians with a destroyed and no longer existent historical treasury of writings) in places that were renamed to be given Russian names. Tombstones of Chechens with a history of hundreds of years have been used by Soviets for the construction of pedestrian footpasses, foundations of houses, pig pens, etc. In 1991, Dzhokhar Dudayev made political capital by, in a symbolic move, sending out officials to gather these lost gravestones, a number of which had lost their original inscriptions, and construct out of them a wall. This wall was made to symbolize both Chechen remorse for the past as well as the desire to, in the name of the dead ancestors, fashion the best possible Chechen Republic out of their land and work hard towards the future. It bears an engravement, reading: "We will not break, we will not weep; we will never forget"; tablets bore pictures of the sites of massacres, such as Khaibakh. It has now been moved by the Kadyrov government, sparking mass controversy.

=== Recognition of the deportation as a genocide ===
Forced deportation constitutes an act of genocide according to the IV Hague Convention of 1907 and the Convention on the prevention and repression of the crime of genocide of the UN General Assembly (adopted in 1948) and in this case this was acknowledged by the European Parliament as an act of genocide in 2004.

=== The return ===
In 1957, four years after Stalin's death in 1953, the Soviet of Ministers passed a decree allowing repressed nations to freely travel in the Soviet Union. Exiled Chechens took this opportunity to return to their ancestral land. This caused talk of a restoration of Chechen autonomy in the Northern Caucasus, the first secretary of the Grozny Oblast CPSU committee, Alexander Yakovlev, supported this idea, but pushed for a temporary autonomy in Kazakhstan, citing the insufficient resources in the province to house the re-patriated peoples (most of the former Chechen houses were settled by refugees from western USSR).

Chechens and Ingush had already been returning to their homeland in the tens of thousands for a couple of years before the announcement; after Khruschev's denunciation of Stalin, the rate of return increased exponentially. By 1959, almost all Chechens and Ingush had returned.

In 1957, the Chechen-Ingush ASSR was officially restored by a decree directly from Moscow, but in previous 1936 borders. For example, South Ossetia kept the Prigorodny District, instead the republic was "compensated" with ethnic Russian territory on the left-bank Terek, Naursky district and Shelkovsky Districts. Shelkovsky (Moxne in Chechen) in fact had a Chechen heritage before the invasion of the Cossacks, and Naursky (called Hovran in Chechen) also had Chechens in its Eastern regions before the Russian invasion, though the bulk of Naursky may have been instead Kabardins. Nonetheless, the Russian populace (especially the Cossacks) had come, over the years, to view the lands as being theirs, as they had not been dominantly Chechen (or anything besides Cossack) for well over a century at the time of the return of the Chechens.

In the 20th century, several territories of Chechnya changed their owners several times. After the Russian Civil War, lands populated by Terek Cossacks and Russian colonists were granted to Chechens and Ingush as a reward for their support of the Bolsheviks against the White movement. However, these were not lands foreign to Chechens and Ingush. Namely, they were the Chechen lowlands and East Prigorodny (or "West Ingushetia", depending on point of view). The Chechen river lowlands were an integral and indeed, necessary from an economic perspective, part of the historical Chechen nation's land—to the point that even while Cossack settlers had forced the native inhabitants out, the clans retained nominal ownership per the Chechen clan system, which they regained de facto after the revolution. Likewise, with East Prigorodny, it had simply had been transferred to Ossete rule (during the Caucasian War as a reward for the Ossete's treachery of their neighbors) but was still populated mainly by Ingush, though in some areas the Ossetes had indeed forced the original population out or otherwise eradicated it. The return of these two regions angered the Ossetes and the Cossacks, despite the fact that their "ownership" of the regions was disputed not only by the clan land-ownership system of the Vainakh populace, but also by the fact that they had only lived there for barely half a century, as opposed to the multiple millennia of Vainakh habitation of the two regions. Ossete presence in East Prigorodny dated back only to the 19th century, when Ossete expansion was encouraged (and aided) by the Russian state at the expense of the Ingush (see Ossetian-Ingush conflict). Even the North Ossetian capital of Vladikavkaz (in Prigorodny) was actually built on the site of the Ingush town of Zaur. Likewise, as noted on this page, Vainakh presence in the Terek region is ancient in origin (despite a mass of conflicts with Turkic settlers originating with the Mongol Invasions), compared to Cossack presence which could only date back a few centuries, and even greater compared to the recent arrival of urban Russians. Later these lands were partially returned to the Russians or Ossetians, triggering wrath among the Vainakh populace (which was, in any case, being submitted to Aardakh and mass massacre by Stalin at that point). In addition, the easternmost region of Chechenia, Akkia, the land of the Akki Chechens, was taken from Chechnya, and given to Dagestan. Just as had happened in East Prigorodny, the Chechens were sent to Siberia and Central Asia, and their homes were filled (literally) with Laks and Avars, with whom they still dispute the lands of Akkia.

=== Ethnic tensions ===
When the Chechens and Ingush returned to their homeland, they found other peoples living, quite literally, in their houses and on their land. Unsurprisingly, the returnees viewed the other ethnicities—Ossetes, Russians, Laks, Kumyks, and Avars—that had been moved onto the lands that had been theirs before with hostility. In the case of the conflict between Ossetes and Ingush in Prigorodny, and between the Russians/Cossacks and Chechens in northern Chechnya, the conflicts simmered and threatened to boil over into violence multiple times (and actually did more than once). In the case of Akkia, there was more understanding between the Chechens on one side and the Laks, Kumyks and Avars on the other, not because of their historical contacts and shared religion, but rather because the Chechens knew that the Dagestanis had not moved onto their land by choice, but rather were forced to. However, the conflict over Akkia to this day is not resolved, despite efforts by both sides to find a middle ground.

Many returning Chechens were settled in the lowland steppe regions, and in Grozny itself rather than the historical mountainous districts. The goal of this (and, indeed, adding Shelkovskaya and Naursky to Checheno-Ingushetia) was to try to forcefully assimilate the Chechens by keeping them away from the mountains and reminders of "their ancient struggles", and to keep them mixed in with supposedly more loyal Russians so they could not rebel without a counter-force present. Ultimately, the attempt to make Checheno-Ingushetia more multi-ethnic in order to weaken the potential for national awakening and uprising failed, however, due to the Vainakh's much higher birthrate. It did however succeed in deepening and renewing ethnic conflict between Chechens and Russians. The Russians, angered by issues over land ownership (they had come to view the lands they had settled as "theirs") and job competition, rioted as early as 1958. In the 1958 Grozny riots, the Russians seized the central government buildings and demanded either a restoring of Grozny Oblast, or a creation of a non-titular autonomy, re-deportation of the Chechens and Ingush, establishment of "Russian power", mass search and disarming of the Vainakh, before Soviet law-enforcement dispersed the rioters. On 27 August 1958, Major General Stepanov of the Military Aviation School issued an ultimatum to the local Soviet government that the Chechens must be sent back to Siberia and Central Asia or otherwise his Russians would "tear (them) to pieces". Although the riot was dispersed and it was denounced as "chauvinistic", afterward, the republican government made special efforts to please the Russian populace, and mass discrimination against the Chechens aimed at preserving the privileged position of the Russians commenced (see below).

Chechens were greatly disadvantaged in their homeland even after being allowed to return. There were no Chechen-language schools in their own homeland until 1990, leading to the crippling effect of lack of education of the populace (which did not universally understand Russian). According to sociologist Georgi Derluguian, the Checheno-Ingush Republic's economy was divided into two spheres, much like French settler-ruled Algeria: the Russian sphere had all the jobs with higher salaries, and non-Russians were systematically kept out of all government positions. Russians (as well as Ukrainians and Armenians) worked in education, health, oil, machinery, and social services. Non-Russians (excluding Ukrainians and Armenians) worked in agriculture, construction, and a long host of undesirable jobs, as well as in the so-called "informal sector" (i.e., illegal, due to the mass discrimination in the legal sector). Due to rapid population growth among the non-Russians, combined with unfavorable economic conditions, the non-Russian population frequently engaged in the practice known in Russian as "shabashka", the unofficial migration of republic minorities for economic reasons. This diaspora often later engaged in organized crime partly due to poverty and job discrimination, and the justification that they were only regaining the money that was stolen from them by the Russian elite in their homeland by its institutionalized discrimination. Derluguian (see citation above) describes this further as one of the main causes of the rebirth of the concept of Chechen nationalism in a much more unity-oriented form (that is, unity between Chechens, and Ingush if they want to be part of it).

== Perestroika and post-Soviet Chechnya ==
=== The Gorbachev era nationalist revival ===
The experience (in addition to previous memories of conflicts with the Russian state) of the starvation in the 1930s, of Aardakh in 1944 and of the ethnic conflict with the Russian populace after the return from exodus had, according to Derluguian, Wood and others, allowed for the unification of loyalties. Bridges were made between taip, vird, and the like, and relationships were forged with prisonmates, partners in crime, among members of Chechen mafias in Russia, among members of labour teams, while the importance of taip and vird diminished due to the pressures of modernization. The Chechen narrative increasingly took the stance of a united Chechen struggle to escape once and for all the perceived oppression by the Russian state and to escape future hardships. In 1985, Mikhail Gorbachev came to power as the leader in the Soviet Union, and pursued a policy of openness and non-censorship of controversial issues. This allowed all of these issues to come to the forefront, as Chechen organizations became less and less reserved in their rhetoric and began saying what they had thought the whole time: that Chechens were persecuted time and time again, and continued to be, and that the Russian state was at fault. And the "Question" was asked: how can the Chechen people once and for all escape future persecution?

The answer to this "Question" came as independence in the perestroika period when the first Caucasian nationalist movement (in fact, predating all other formalized movements in all parts of the USSR except the Baltic states and Georgia), named Kavkaz was established in 1987. Explicitly Chechen national movements were established a year later, notably including the Vainakh Democratic Party (VDP, though its goal of a unified Vainakh state ended in 1993 with Ingushetia's secession), and its trade union, named (of all things) Bart (unity in Chechen), established in 1989. The first target for Chechen historians to handle was the Russian-fabricated myth of Chechens and Ingush voluntarily joining Russia.

Much of the ideology came directly from the Baltic (especially Estonia), where Chechens observed with increasing admiration the success of nationalist revival movements. The spark for the forming of Kavkaz, however, was not nationalist, but rather environmentalist concerns: there were plans to build a nuclear power plant in the vicinity. Chechen culture had always revered nature, and political environmentalism blossomed in this period, but became a component of Chechen nationalism. Kavkaz soon became a nationalist movement with saving nature only as a side goal to be pursued once the Chechen nation had achieved an independent state.

=== Prelude to the 1991 Revolution ===
In 1989, for the first time, a non-Russian, a Chechen, was appointed to be the ruler of Checheno-Ingushetia – Doku Zavgayev. While this was first embraced by Chechen nationalist movements, Zavgayev turned out to be extremely corrupt. The Chechen nationalist movements began to act against Zavgayev; in 1990, the highly nationalistic former Soviet aviator Dzhokhar Dudayev was elected head of the All-National Congress of the Chechen People which became the mouthpiece of the Chechen opposition.

There were also some signs from Moscow that the Chechens – as well as others – read as a green light. One of the most significant of these was on 26 April 1990, when the Supreme Soviet declared that the ASSRs within Russia get "the full plenitude of state power", and put them on the same levels as Union Republics, which had the (at least nominal) right to secession. In August 1990, while campaigning for presidency of the RSFSR, Boris Yeltsin famously told ASSRs to "take as much sovereignty as [they] could stomach" back from Russia.

On 25 November 1990, the first Chechen National Congress declared the "rightful sovereignty" of the "Chechen Republic of Noxçi-ço". Two days later, on 27 November, the Supreme Soviet declared its agreement with this by declaring Checheno-Ingushetia's sovereignty and adding that it would negotiate with Russia on equal footing, raising Chechnya to the level of Georgia, Azerbaijan and Armenia – that is, a Union Republic. At this point, the Chechen Communists had begun supporting "full sovereignty at a minimum", meaning utterly every major party in Chechnya that included Chechens – the VDP, the Greens, the Communists, the Islamic Path Party, and the secularist Popular Front of Checheno-Ingushetia (modeled off that of Azerbaijan) – supported sovereignty, if not full independence.

The decisive move came on 22 August 1991, three days after the beginning of the August Coup. Government buildings were stormed by political groups representing the broad swathe of Chechen politics with the sole exception of Zavgayev: the Greens, the Islamists, the Nationalists, the Liberals, and even some of the Communists. One person died, a government official who jumped trying to escape or was pushed out of a window. Zavgayev was forced to resign.

=== Dissolution of the Soviet Union and afterwards ===
After the demise of the Soviet Union, the situation in Chechnya became unclear. Below is the chronology of that time:

- On 2 September 1991, the Russian installed Islamic board of the Caucasus, claiming that the executive committee was not legitimate and that actions of the committee would inevitably lead to bloodshed.
- On 6 September 1991, the building of the Supreme Soviet was occupied by Dzhokhar Dudayev's guards, who removed the puppet Zavgayev.
- On 15 September 1991, a last session of the Supreme Soviet of the Chechen-Ingush Republic took place, and it decided to dissolve itself (under the request of Dudayev's guards).
- On 1 October 1991, some of the ex-deputies decided to divide the republic into the Chechen Republic and the Ingush Republic. This move was eventually supported by a majority (90%) of Ingush voters, and Dudayev opted to allow the peaceful division of Checheno-Ingushetia into Chechnya and Ingushetia.
- On 27 October 1991, a referendum on independence was held, with a large majority (72%) of the populace voting and a majority approval (over 90% of voters, meaning at least about 64% of the populace approved independence). Khasbulatov contested the results, claiming that the elections were un-democratic (despite the fact that he organized them, apparently).
- On 1 November 1991, Dudayev issued a decree of Chechen independence (Указ об "Об объявлении суверенитета Чеченской Республики с 1 ноября 1991 г.") The International Committee on Human Rights did not report any violations, though Dunlop stated that though there probably were some flaws in the election, he cites the observer, anthropologist Arutyunov (who stated that roughly 60-70% of the population of Chechnya supported independence at the time) it could nonetheless "be regarded as an expression of Chechen popular will."
- On 2 November 1991, the 5th Assembly of People's Deputies of RSFSR (the Russian parliament of that time) took place. A resolution was issued stating that the Chechen Supreme Soviet and President were not legitimate.

The independence years of 1991–94 for the "Chechen Republic of Ichkeria" were marked by growing tension with Russia, a declining economy (due both to a Russian economic blockade and due to Dudayev's poor economic policies- described as such even by his own economic minister), and an increasingly unstable and divided internal political scene, with parts of the opposition being armed by Russia (see below) while the government in Grozny resorting to more and more drastic measures. The economic situation in Chechnya rapidly deteriorated and the civil order broker down. After coming to the power in late 1991 Dudayev began the construction of an "autocratic Chechen state." Dudayev's government armed male Chechens in late 1991 and early 1992 which contributed to abuses against non-Chechens. Chechens who could not find work in Chechnya and lost their seasonal work in Russia turned against Russians and other non-Chechens who did not have the benefit of kin protection. The attacks included physical violence, robberies and "routine humiliations." Some homes were directly seized from Russians, in other case they were forced to sell their apartments at gunpoint. Ethnic Russians were removed from the economic administration and the organs of judicial and legislative power. Other leading representatives of the Russian-language population were murdered, including the university rector Kan-Kalik, dean Udodov, judge Samsonova, cabinet of ministers employee Sanko and journalist Krikoryants. From June 1990 to June 1991 20,000 Russians and other non-Chechens left Chechnya while in the next year 50,000 moved out. Overall, about one-third of Russians who lived in Chechnya were expelled in 1991–1992.

Dudayev was criticized by much of the Chechen political spectrum (particularly in urban Grozny) for his economic policies, a number of eccentric and embarrassing statements (such as insisting that "Nokhchi" meant descendant of Noah and that Russia was trying to destabilize the Caucasus with earthquakes), and his connections to former criminals (some of which, such as Beslan Gantemirov defected to the Russian side and served under Russian-backed regional governments). However, this opposition did not oppose Chechnya's independence from Russia; it simply opposed Dudayev. In 1995 (during the war), one of the major opposition figures of the independence era, Khalid Delmayev, stated that he believed that Chechen statehood could be postponed, but could not be avoided.

The Russian federal government refused to recognize Chechen independence and made several attempts to take full control of the territory of the Chechen Republic. Russia actively funded the Chechen opposition to Dudayev's government, but nonetheless, even members the opposition stated that there was no debate on whether Chechnya should be separate from Russia; there was one option: secession, as reported in 1992 by an observer for Moscow News. The federal government supported a failed coup designed to overthrow Dudayev in 1994.

The covert Russian attempts of overthrowing Dudayev by a means of an armed Chechen opposition forces resulted in repeated failed assaults on the city. Originally, Moscow had been backing the political opposition of Umar Avturkhanov "peacefully" (i.e. not arming them and encouraging them to wage an attempted coup). However, this changed in 1994 when Russia started arming and assisting the opposition. In August 1994 Avturkhanov attacked Grozny, but was repelled first by Chechen citizens who were then joined by Grozny government troops and Russian helicopters covered his retreat. On 28 September, one of these helicopters was indeed shot down and its Russian pilot was held as a prisoner-of-war by the Chechen government. The last one on 26 November 1994 ended with capture of 21 Russian Army tank crew members, secretly hired as mercenaries by the FSK (former KGB, soon renamed FSB); their capture was sometimes cited as one of the reasons of Boris Yeltsin's decision to launch the open intervention. In the meantime, Grozny airport and other targets were bombed by unmarked Russian aircraft. Russia then decided to invade Chechnya to reestablish control by the federal government in Moscow.

== First Chechen War (1994–1996) ==
Russian federal forces overran Grozny in November 1994. Although the forces achieved some initial successes, the federal military made a number of critical strategic blunders during the Chechnya campaign and was widely perceived as incompetent. Led by Aslan Maskhadov, separatists conducted successful guerrilla operations from the forested and mountainous terrain. By March 1995, Aslan Maskhadov became leader of the Chechen resistance.

Russia first appointed in early 1995 a government with Khadzhiyev as ruler and Avturkhanov as deputy. Gantemirov was also restored to his position as mayor of Grozny. However, later in the fall of that year, Khadzhiyev was replaced with Doku Zavgayev, the former head of the republic who had fled after the Dudayev-led revolution in 1990–1991. He was extremely unpopular not only among the Chechens, but also among even the Russian diaspora, who nicknamed him "Doku Aeroportovich" because he rarely ever left the Russian-run airbase in Khankala. By statistics given by the Russian government itself's Audit Committee, he was allocated 12.3 trillion rubles in the first two months alone in a republic now impoverished by war and bloodshed.

Although at first, the Russians had the upper hand despite determined homegrown Chechen civilian resistance, halfway through the war, the separatist Chechen government released a statement calling for help. They received it both from the Islamic world (with numbers of Arabs streaming in), but more prominently from former Soviet states and satellites, with Baltic peoples, Estonians, Romanians, Azeris, Dagestanis, Circassians, Abkhaz, Georgians, Poles, Ukrainians, Belarusians, Hungarians, and even a few Russians streaming in to aid the so-called "cause of freedom" that the Chechen government professed. Diaspora Chechens also returned, as parallel to the First Nagorno-Karabakh War, to aid their "daymokhk" (fatherland). With the new troops also came new weaponry, and from this point forward, the tables were turned, with the Russian army becoming more and more mutinous and lacking of morale, while the anti-Russian side was growing stronger and more confident (see also: First Chechen War, on this phenomenon).

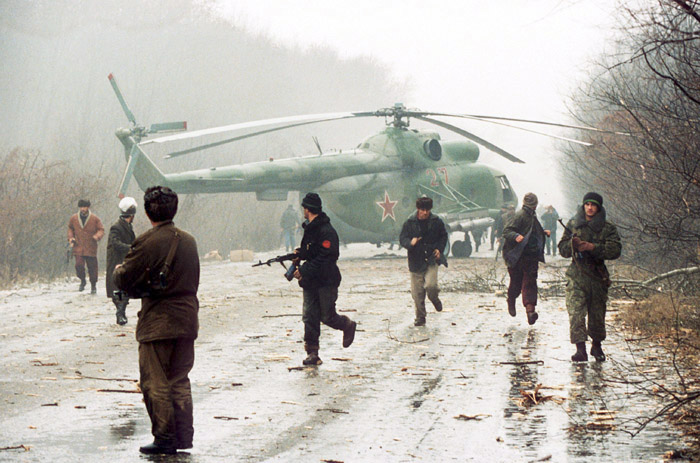
Seizure of the helicopter

In June 1995, Chechen guerrillas occupied a hospital in the southern Russian town of Budyonnovsk (in Stavropol Krai), taking over 1,000 hostages. Federal forces attempted to storm the hospital twice and failed; the guerrillas were allowed to leave after freeing their hostages. This incident, televised accounts of war crimes and mass destruction, and the resulting widespread demoralization of the federal army, led to a federal withdrawal and the beginning of negotiations on 21 March 1996.

Separatist President Dudayev was killed in a Russian rocket attack on 21 April 1996, and the Vice-president Zelimkhan Yandarbiyev became president. Negotiations on Chechen independence were repeatedly finally tabled in August 1996, leading to the end of the war and withdrawal of federal forces.

In the later stages of the First Chechen War, a large exodus of non-Vainakhs occurred.

=== Interwar period: 1996–1999 ===
In 1997, Aslan Maskhadov comfortably won the election, campaigning as a moderate who would unite the various factions within Chechen society, but establish Chechnya as an independent and secular state, aligning itself with the West more than with the Middle East, as well as keeping Ichkeria safe from another armed conflict with Russia by maintaining relatively positive relations. Yandarbiyev's platform was an explicitly Islamic state with some implementation of sharia law, and a largely Islamophilic foreign policy. Basayev, finally, insisted on focusing less on gaining foreign support and recognition and more on rebuilding Ichkeria's own military. Basayev, despite criticizing Yandarbiyev's policy towards radical Islamic groups, stated that attacks on Russian territory outside Chechnya should be executed if it is necessary to remind Russia that Ichkeria was not a pushover. At the point of 1997, as evidenced from the election, Maskhadov's policy of relative moderation and looking West for help was most popular, though he gained considerable following because of his status as a war hero. The results of the election were a 79.4% turnout, with 59.3% voting for Maskhadov, 23.5% voting for Basayev and 10.1% voting for Yandarbiyev.

Aslan Maskhadov became president in 1997, but was unable to consolidate control as the wartorn republic devolved into regional bickering among local teip leaders and factions. One major source of his unpopularity was the perception of him being "weak" in dealing with Russia, which was exploited by the more militaristic opposition.

Maskhadov sought to maintain Chechen sovereignty while pressing Moscow to help rebuild the republic, whose formal economy and infrastructure were virtually destroyed. Russia continued to send money for the rehabilitation of the republic; it also provided pensions and funds for schools and hospitals. However, much of this did not arrive, its disappearance being attributed to embezzlement by either Russian or Chechen officials/warlords (or both). Nearly half a million people (40% of Chechnya's prewar population) had been internally displaced and lived in refugee camps or overcrowded villages. The economy was destroyed. Two Russian brigades were stationed in Chechnya and did not leave.

Chechnya had been badly damaged by the war and the economy was in shambles. Aslan Maskhadov tried to concentrate power in his hands to establish authority, but had trouble creating an effective state or a functioning economy. He attempted to attract foreign investment in Chechnya's oil industry and reconstruction of Grozny.

The war ravages and lack of economic opportunities left numbers of armed former guerrillas with no occupation but further violence. Kidnappings, robberies, and killings of fellow Chechens and outsiders, most notably the killings of four employees of British Granger Telecom in 1998, weakened the possibilities of outside investment and Maskhadov's efforts to gain international recognition of its independence effort. Kidnappings became common in Chechnya, procuring over $200 million during the three-year independence of the chaotic fledgling state, but victims were rarely killed. In 1998, 176 people had been kidnapped, and 90 of them had been released during the same year according to official accounts. There were several public executions of criminals. Caving to intense pressure from his Islamist foes in his desire to find a national consensus, Maskhadov allowed the proclamation of the Islamic Republic of Ichkeria in 1998 and the Sharia system of justice was introduced.

President Maskhadov started a major campaign against hostage-takers, and on 25 October 1998, Shadid Bargishev, Chechnya's top anti-kidnapping official, was killed in a remote controlled car bombing. Bargishev's colleagues then insisted they would not be intimidated by the attack and would go ahead with their offensive. Other anti-kidnapping officials blamed the attack on Bargishev's recent success in securing the release of several hostages, including 24 Russian soldiers and an English couple. Maskhadov blamed the rash of abductions in Chechnya on unidentified "outside forces" and their Chechen henchmen, allegedly those who joined Pro-Moscow forces during the second war.

Some of the kidnapped (most of whom were non-Chechens) were sold into indentured servitude to Chechen families. They were openly called slaves and had to endure starvation, beating, and often maiming.

The years of independence had some political violence as well. On 10 December, Mansur Tagirov, Chechnya's top prosecutor, disappeared while returning to Grozny. On 21 June, the Chechen security chief and a guerrilla commander fatally shot each other in an argument. The internal violence in Chechnya peaked on 16 July 1998, when fighting broke out between Maskhadov's National Guard force led by Sulim Yamadayev (who joined pro-Moscow forces in the second war) and militants in the town of Gudermes; over 50 people were reported killed and the state of emergency was declared in Chechnya.

Maskhadov proved unable to guarantee the security of the oil pipeline running across Chechnya from the Caspian Sea, and illegal oil tapping and acts of sabotage deprived his regime of crucial revenues and agitated Moscow. In 1998 and 1999 Maskhadov survived several assassination attempts, blamed on the Russian intelligence services.

== Second Chechen War and its consequences ==
Map of Chechnya

In August 1999, renegade Chechen and Arab commanders led a large group of militants into Dagestan. Headed by Shamil Basayev and Amir Khattab (who were opposed vehemently by the government in Grozny, from which they had broken off allegiance), the insurgents fought Russian forces in Dagestan for a week before being driven back into Chechnya proper. On 9 September 1999, Chechens were blamed for the bombing of an apartment complex in Moscow and several other explosions in Russia.

These events were viewed by Russia's new prime minister Vladimir Putin as a violation of the Khasav-Yurt Accord by the Chechen side. Thus, on 1 October 1999, Russian troops entered Chechnya. However, according to then-interior minister Sergei Stepashin, the invasion of Chechnya would have occurred even if these events had not occurred:

The decision to invade Chechnya was made in March 1999... I was prepared for an active intervention. We were planning to be on the north side of the Terek River by August–September [of 1999]. This [the war] would happen regardless of the bombings in Moscow... Putin did not discover anything new. You can ask him about this. He was the director of FSB at this time and had all information.

Much better trained and prepared than in the first war, by December all of the northern steppe regions were conquered, and Grozny was encircled, which finally surrendered in early February 2000. By late spring, all of the lowland, and most of the mountainous territory was successfully re-claimed by the federal forces.

After several years of military administration, in 2002, a local government was formed by Russian-allied Chechens headed by Akhmad Kadyrov. In 2003, referendum on constitution and presidential election were held. However, it was widely criticized, and in some cases, the vote recorded was not only vastly more than the actual population living there, but the majority of "voters" were Russian soldiers and dead Chechens (who of course were "loyal" pro-Russians, according to the results).

The Chechen separatists initially resisted fiercely, and several high-profile battles resulted in their victories such as the Battle of Hill 776 and Zhani-Vedeno ambush. Nonetheless, the success in establishing a Russian-allied Chechen militia and the actions of Russian Special Forces meant that in 2002 Putin announced that the war was officially over.

However, the Insurgency continued, and has spread to neighbouring regions with high-profile clashes such as the Battle of Nalchik and the Beslan School siege. After Beslan, there was a 4-5-year drought of major attacks by Chechens outside of Chechnya. According to some, this was due to an element of embarrassment and guilt on the part of the Chechen rebels over the deaths of children in Beslan.

The September 11 attacks on the United States caused a disaster for the Chechens, as much of the West went from passive sympathy to hostility as Russia was able to brand Chechen separatism as Islamist. As Amjad Jaimoukha puts it,

The al-Qaeda attacks on the US on 11 September 2001 resulted in a major setback to the Chechen cause and robbed the Chechens of the small modicum of sympathy they had had in the West. Russia played its cards right and quickly associated Chechen legitimate struggle for independence with Muslim extremism.

The raid on Beslan had, in fact, more to do with the Ingush involved than the Chechens, but was highly symbolic for both. The Ossetes and Ingush had (and have) a conflict over ownership of the Prigorodny District, which hit high points during the 1944 genocide, and the ethnic cleansing of Ingush by Ossetes (the Ossetes getting assistance from the Russian military) in 1992–3. At the time of the raid, there were still over 40,000 Ingush refugees in tent camps in Ingushetia and Chechnya. The Beslan school itself had been used against the Ingush- in 1992 the gym was used as a pen to round up Ingush for expulsion and/or massacre by the Ossetes. For the Chechens, the motive was revenge for the destruction of their homes and, indeed families: Beslan was the site from which missiles were launched at Chechnya. A fraction (overwhelming majority) of the people involved in the hostage taking raid also direct victims of Russian abuse, including a number of whom were victimized as children and/or, in the case of Khaula Nazirov, had their children ironically murdered by Russian troops during a raid of a school.

Once, however, it was broadcast that there were large amounts of children killed by a group that included Chechens, the Chechens were struck with a large amount of shame. One spokesman for the Chechen cause stated that "Such a bigger blow could not be dealt upon us... People around the world will think that Chechens are monsters if they could attack children". He went on to state that the Russians had killed far more children, including in schools during their war in Chechnya, and that this had been deliberately ignored by the rest of the world. Nonetheless, largely for this reason, attacks ceased until 2008.

Both the federal and separatist armies have been widely criticized by human rights groups such as Amnesty International for alleged war crimes committed during the two Chechen wars, including accusations on both sides of rape, torture, looting, and the murder of civilians. The Russian military has been repeatedly reported to have used vacuum bombs and bombed white-flag bearing civilian vessels (see the Katyr-Yurt Massacre) by international charity groups. Dozens of mass graves (created by the Russian side) containing hundreds of corpses have been uncovered since the beginning of the Chechen wars in 1994. As of June 2008, there were 57 registered locations of mass graves in Chechnya. According to Amnesty International, thousands may be buried in unmarked graves including up to 5,000 civilians who disappeared since the beginning of the Second Chechen War in 1999. In 2008, the largest mass grave found to date was uncovered in Grozny, containing some 800 bodies from the First Chechen War in 1995. Russia's general policy to the Chechen mass graves is to not exhume them.

== Post-war Chechnya ==
The two wars have left millions of people living in poverty, up to half a million refugees, and most of the infrastructure destroyed. Kadyrov claims that since then Northern Chechnya and Grozny have been rebuilt. These claims have been refuted by most other sources (such as Tony Wood), who note that most of the revenue has gone to the construction of Kadyrov's private mansion for his clan and his expensive birthday celebration. In a CNN interview, Kadyrov once compared the Chechen people to a pet lion cub, stating that "...[they] will either learn to be obedient or it will kill me".

About 40,000 ethnic Russians lived in Chechnya in 2020, mostly in the rural northern Chechnya and in Grozny.

== See also ==
- History of Russia (1992–present)
