= Battle of Sadoy-Lam =

1252 military conflict in Sadoy-Lam

- Part of the Mongol invasions of Durdzuketi
Date	1252
Location	Sadoy-Lam, Durdzuketi 42.936736647261625°N 45.86827203615239°E
Result	Mongol victory: End of Khour's insurgency

Belligerents
Durdzuk resistance fighters: Sadoy clan; Peshkhoy clan; Other Chechen clans	Mongol Empire: Mongol-led Kingdom of Alania; Kingdom of Boturcha; Kingdom of Navrazcho

Commanders and leaders
Khour I Other Chechen tribal leaders	Ors; Botur; Navraz

Casualties and losses
Heavy	Unknown

In 1252, the forces of the Chechen resistance fighters led by Khour I clashed with the armies of the Mongol and their Durdzuk allies on Mt. Sadoy-Lam (Note: Chechen: Садой-лам), near the modern-day Chechen village Selmentauzen. The battle ended in a defeat for the former, resulting in Khour's assassination not long after and the end of the Insurgency in Durdzuketi. (Note: Chechen: Селман-Тевзана; Russian: Сельментаузен)

Previously, the resistance fighters led by Khour I had undertaken several raids on Mongol posts in the lowlands and highlands of modern-day Chechnya. One such raids found place in 1252 on Sadoy-Lam. Before the attack of Khour's troops, the pro-Mongol Chechen commanders Ors, Botur and Navraz had gathered their forces and occupied a strong position on the mountain.
During the battle that ensued, the troops of Khour II failed to capture the mountain and suffered a devastating defeat, which eventually put an end to the Insurgency of Khour II.

Soon after the battle, Khour II was betrayed by Georgian princes, which eventually led to his assassination in the same year. He was succeeded by his only son Chakh the following year, in 1253.

== See also ==
- Mongol invasions of Durdzuketi
- Khour I
- Ors Ela
- Botur
- Chakhig

== Sources ==
- Муртазалиев, В.Ю. К вопросу истории государства и права чеченцев (in Russian). Грозный.
- Тесаев, 3.А. (2020). Исторические личности Чечни (XI-XXI вв.) (in Russian). Грозный: Акционерное общество Издательско-полиграфический комплекс Грозненский рабочий. pp. 1–720.
- Ангуни, Амин (2013). Государственность Народа Нохчий (in Russian). Издательский аппарат общества Бяццара Кхиэташуо (БК).
