= Durdzuketi =

- Map of Durdzuketia in the 10th Century
- Official languages: Nakh languages
- Demonyms: Durdzuks; Durdzuketian
- Government: Kingdom
  - King: Durdzuk

Durdzuketia (Chechen: Дзурдзукия) was a historical Nakh kingdom in the North Caucasus, Durdzuketia was established in the 4th century and was destroyed in the Chechen-Mongol war.

== History of Durdzuketia ==
Durdzuketia was formed after the Nakh king, Durdzuk united Nakh tribes and created a Kingdom localized in central to southern Chechnya and parts of Ingushetia.

Durdzuks fought against the Scythians and defeated the invading forces, after this, they became a significant power in the area in the region in the first millennium BC

The Durdzuks conducted raids of Kakheti and Bazaleti during the reign of Mirian I, The Georgian king, enraged by this invaded them and ravaged some Durdzuk land. Later Durdzuketia allied itself with Georgia and also helped with consolidating the unruly vassals of the Georgian king Pharnavaz I of Iberia Durdzuks also helped fighting the troops of Jalal al-Din Mangburni

Durdzuketia was invaded and eventually destroyed by the Mongols after the brutal wars.
