= Botur =

Botur Ela

King of Boturcha
- Reign: 1241–1275
- Predecessor: Office established
- Successor: Illes

Ela Botur (Chechen: "Эла Ботур" = "Prince Botur", also known as "Ele Badur" in historical sources) was a Chechen feudal lord and king of Boturcha who led a pro-Mongol administration of newly established state. His later life and reign correspond to the historical personality mentioned in the Chinese chronicle Yuan-Shi–"Ele Badur"

== Family ==
? (Father)
Matarsha (Brother) | Botur | Utszorbu Khan (Brother)
Illes/Illya (Son)
Esutayer (Grandson) | Yuvashi (Grandson)

Esirat (niece of botur)

== Early reign ==
Botur was the ruler of the village Boturcha (subject to the Kingdom of Alania), which, according to Suleymanov, was named after him.

Before the Mongol invasions of Durdzuketi, Botur (along with several other Alan feudal lords) conducted secret negotiations with the Mongol Empire, in which an independent state under his rule after the invasion of Alania and Durdzuketi was discussed.

== Boturcha rebellion ==
With the start of the main Mongol campaign in 1238, he, accompanied by his two brothers Matarsha and Utszorbu Khan as well as his son Illes and grandson Yuvashi, met with Möngke Khan and expressed his obedience, thus declaring a rebellion against Khasi I, after which he sent an army, mainly led by his brother Matarsha (among the army were also his other family members) to Maghas in order to help the Mongols in besieging the city as well as support their campaign across all of Alania and Durdzuketi. This decision was supported by most of the Dishniy clan, especially Botur's family. His reign however was also opposed by his niece and the wife of Khour I, Esirat, who supported the resistance.

== Mongol invasions of Durdzuketi and Alania ==
Among the besiegers of Maghas were the Chinese, Mongols as well as the Dishniy army led by Matarsha and other relatives of Botur. Esirat, who opposed Botur's regime, was also trapped in Maghas, where she expected a child. She managed to escape the city through a secret passage into the Cheberloy region, Southeast Chechnya, where she gave birth to Khour I's only son, Ela Chakh/Chakhig. According to Chinese sources, the Alan feudal lord "Matarsh" played a crucial role in the capture of Maghas. The fall of the city also marked the capitulation of Khasi I and the start of the pro-Mongol administration of the region, as well as the start of the insurgency in Durdzuketi. With the execution of Khasi I in 1241, Durdzuketi was split up between Botur and Ors. Botur was gifted the lowlands of today's Chechnya, as well as the cities Aldy and Vedeno, which had previously belonged to the Sado-Orsoy dynasty of Chechnya. The resistance, led by Khour I, led to the persecution of the Sado-Orsoy dynasty, further strengthening Botur's authority.

In 1252, allied with Ors, Navraz and other pro-Mongol rulers of vassal Alania, Botur decisively defeated the resistance fighters led by Khour I during the Battle of Sadoy-Lam, putting a final end to the insurgency in Durdzuketi. Khour was soon later betrayed by Georgian princes, leading to his capture and murder.

== Later life ==
Following the end of Khour's insurgency, the Mongols successfully provoked armed conflicts between the pro-Mongol administrators in order to weaken their influence. The same happened with Botur, who now engaged in conflicts with the administration of Ors Ela as well as other Durdzuk feudal lords. "Ele Badur", together with his son and grandson, Illes and Esutayer respectively, died during the Mongol conquest of southern China.

== See also ==
- Mongol invasions of Durdzuketi
- Ors Ela
- Khasi I
- Battle of Sadoy-Lam
