= Ors Ela =

King of Alania and Durdzuketi
- Reign: 1241-13th century
- Predecessor: Khasi I
- Successor: Niklai?
- Dynasty: Sado-Orsoy
- Religion: Orthodox Christianity

Ors (Chechen: Ors Ela–Орс Эла or Ars-Ela–Арс Эла, in historical sources referred to as "Ars-Alan") was a Chechen feudal lord from the Sado-Orsoy dynasty of Chechnya and the leader of the pro-Mongol Durdzuk administration in the 13th century. In Chechen folklore he is also credited with being the ancestor of the Elistanzhoy (Chechen: Элистанжой). In historical records, he is referred to as Ars-Alan.

== Family ==
Although being part of the same royal house, the connection between Ors and the ruling family (such as Khour II) is not known. In the historical Chinese chronicle Yuan-Shi however, the names of Ors' descendants are given:

- Ors
  - Asanzhen
  - Nikolai
  - Miklai
    - Unknown
      - Tszya-Khua
        - Chzhoyanibu-Khua

== Early reign ==
Before the Main Mongol campaign of Durdzuketi Alania, Ors was the ruler of the city Arsoy, located in the Southeast of Chechnya, not far from the border to Dagestan.

== Mongol invasion of Durdzuketi and Alania ==
Although historical sources mention his participation in the Siege of Maghas, he played a crucial role in the later politics of Durdzuketi and Alania. The execution of Khasi I led to intense struggle for power between the anti-Mongol regime of Khour I and the pro-Mongol regime of Botur. To restore stability, the Mongols preferred a member of the royal house, the Sado-Orsoy dynasty.

=== Rise to power ===
As Mongol troops led by Möngke Khan arrived near Ors' domain in Arsoy, he, accompanied by his eldest son Asanzhen, appeared to the Mongols in friendly terms. In a meeting held not far from the village Makhkety village, the title of ruler was given to Ors. H. A. Khizriev writes: "For example, when Möngke Khan took the city of the "Assun ruler" Ars-Alan and the latter expressed his obedience to him, he "issued to Ars-Alan a charter to govern the Assu people (=Alans, Durdzuks)". In the agreement, Ors, just like Khasi, had to send 1,000 soldiers as well as give his oldest son, Asanzhen to serve in the Mongl army and accompany Möngke Khan in his campaigns. Not long afterwards however Möngke's army, among whom was Asanzhen, fought against rebels, in a battle of which Asanzhen was killed. Möngke ordered his body to be wrapped in cloth and returned to his father. Following that, Ors said to Möngke "My oldest son died, he could not work for the state. Now I will give you my second son, Nikolay, so that you can use his services."

=== Reign ===
Following the start of the insurgency in Durdzuketi, due to the resistance led by Khour I, an active persecution of members of the royal house began, after which only few of the dynasty remained, among whom was Ors.

Together with Botur and other pro-Mongol Durdzuk administrators, Ors actively worked on crushing the Durdzuk resistance. Soon after the start of his reign, the Sadoy and Peshkhoy clans of Chechnya resisted his regime. This led to his campaign in the respective regions, defeating and ousting both clans, forcing them to join Khour's insurgency in the mountains. During his campaigns, he established the settlement "Ela-Jaaran-Kort" ("Princely cross top"), which would later serve as a capital for his state. The name of the village would later develop to "Elistanzhoy", from which the Elistanzhoy clan of Eastern Chechnya stems from.

In 1252, Ors, Botur, Navraz and other Durdzuk administrators gathered their forces near Sadoy-Lam, not far from the today's village Selmentauzen. In a battle that ensued soon after, the resistance fighters (mainly the Sadoy and Peshkhoy clans) led by Khour would suffer a devastating defeat, putting a final end to the insurgency in Durdzuketi. Khour himself was soon later betrayed and eventually murdered.

== Later reign ==
Following the death of Ors, the Mongols provoked armed conflicts between the administrators for power and land. Among them was Ors, who waged war against Botur, as a result weakening both states.

Ors, together with a detachment of 1,000 men, accompanied Möngke Khan on his campaigns.

== See also ==
- Mongol invasions of Durdzuketi
- Khasi I
- Botur
- Battle of Sadoy-Lam
