= Almaz (mythical beast) =

Mythological forest creature

The Almaz (Adyghe: Almesti, Chechen and Ingush: Almaz or Hun-sag; ), roughly translated as various "feral forest-man" or "stone spirit", is a mythical beast that is considered to be an evil forest creature with magical powers residing in its hair that exists in Chechen, Ingush and Circassian folk beliefs.

== Mythology ==
The first "attestation" of it in writing was by a Bavarian captive of the Mongols, but it is present in the national folklores of Chechens, Ingush and Circassians. The male almaz is said to be hairy and hideous, and have an axe embedded in its chest, while the female is very beautiful with large breasts and golden hair, and has a "favorite pastime" of dancing naked at night under the moon. The almaz is said to have magical powers residing in its hair, but if the hair is removed or even grabbed, it may be rendered helpless. It has been theorized by some to have arisen under Mongolian influence, either during the Mongol invasions of Dzurdzuketia or the intervening period where the northern Dzurdzuk state of Simsir was subjugated to the Mongol-controlled Golden Horde. The word almaz is a loan from Mongolian where it originally meant "forest man". Amjad Jaimoukha however suggested that the name "almaz" may have started to have been used by North Caucasians for an already existent native concept during the sojourn of the Golden Horde of Simsir.

== Cited sources ==
- Amjad Jaimoukha (2005) The Chechens: A Handbook. Routledge. ISBN 978-0415323284
