= Ghalghai Koashke =

Ancient outposts in Ingushetia

- ГӀалгӀай коашке
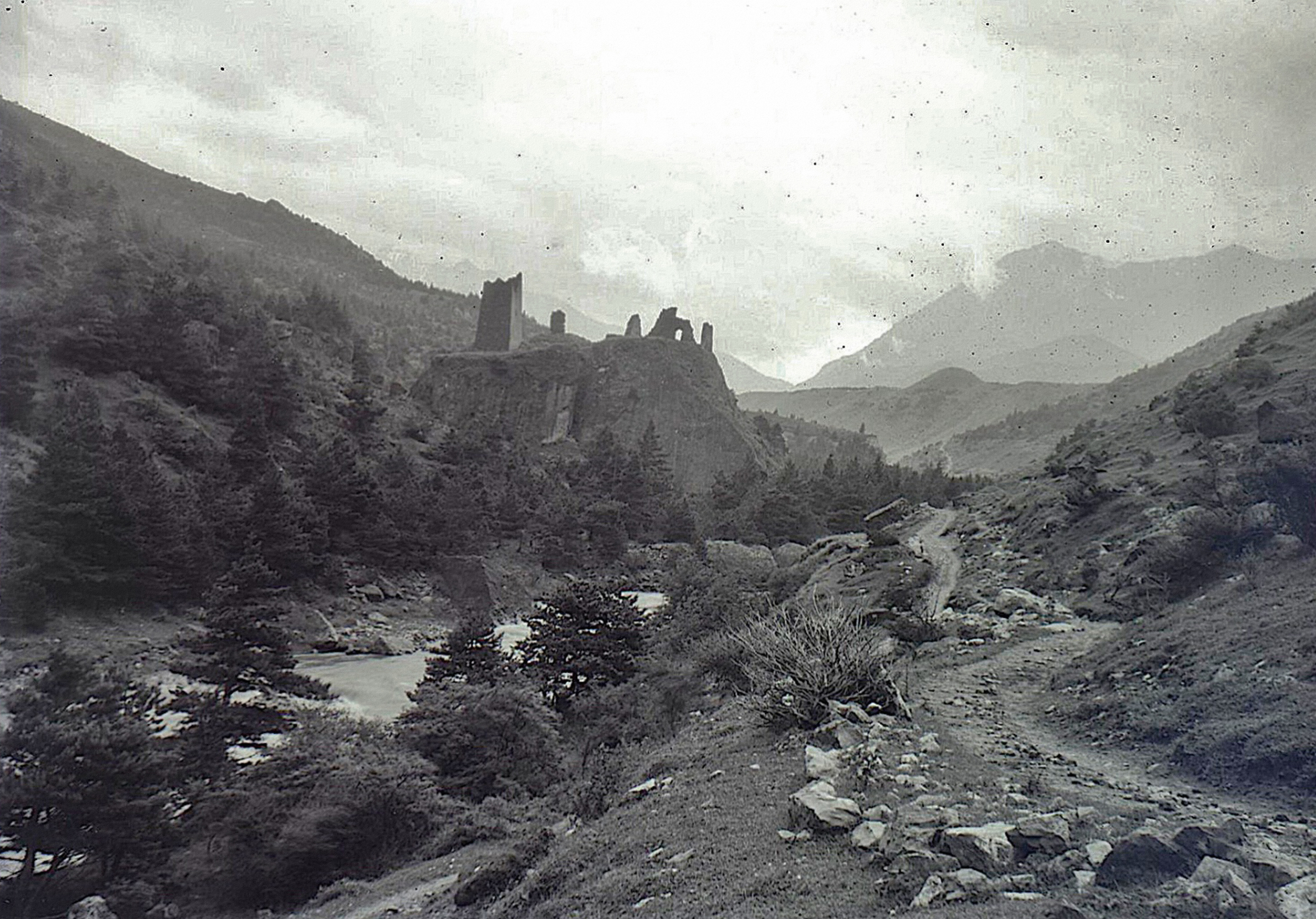
- Remains of an outpost in the Assa valley.
- Interactive map of the Ghalghai Koashke area

General information
- Type: Watchtowers
- Location: Ingushetia, Russia
- Coordinates: 42.85348°N 44.93146°E

Ghalghai Koashke or Ghalghai Na'arghe (Ingush: ГӀалгӀай коашке, ГIалгIай наIарге) is the name of ancient Ingush outposts in the Assa valley of the Dzheyrakhsky District of Ingushetia, historically also known as the Durdzuk Gates or Gates of Durdzuketi. The entire territory is included in the Dzheyrakh-Assa State Historical-Architectural and Natural Museum-Reserve and is under state protection.

== Etymology ==
Ghalghai Koashke is a composition of the words — Ghalghai, which is the self-name of the Ingush people and koashke, which is the local plural form of the Ingush word kov, meaning "fortified settlement" or "outpost". According to professor Doshluko Malsagov this was used by the ancients to refer to gates in Caucasian gorges.

== History ==
The Durdzuk Gates, also known as the Assa Gates, are reportedly known in Georgian chronicles since the VI century AD. D. Malsagov suggests that the IX century geographer Ibn al-Faqih's report of the building of 12 gates and stone fortifications in the country of the Durdzuks by the Persian king Anushirvan, which A. Genko locates in the region of the Assa Gorge, is connected with old Ingush legends about folk heroes Koloy-Kant, Pẋagal Bärē, Seska Solsa, et al., who guarded the Assa Gorge from the invasion of enemies from the plane. N. Yakovlev, notes that the Ingush have lived in the Ghalghai (Assa) Gorge from time immemorial. A stone wall was made across the gorge by them, and their guards stood at the only entrance. No one could leave or enter without the permission of the guards. Among the defenders of these outposts, were many Ingush clans (teips), notably the nearby Egakhoy, Targimkhoy, Khamkhoy, Gäginäqan, Barkhanoy, Barakhoy, Barkinkhoy, Yovloy and Kokurkhoy (Ferta Shouli's clan).

“Since ancient times, in the mountains of the Galgai, the people had fortified settlements spreading to present-day Khevsureti and Tusheti. Along the gorges of the rivers Terek and Assa existed stone walls called “Galgai Koashke” with watchtowers that secured the passages, the remains of which are still visible today.”

— F.I. Gorepekin

== Geography ==
Many stone outposts and settlements can still be found on both banks of the Assa River in mountainous Ingushetia. The most known outpost is located on a rocky ledge at the exit from the Assa Gorge. According to legend, the tower complex was badly damaged as a result of a terrible collapse. The remains of the once five-story battle tower and residential buildings have been preserved in the fortress.

== See also ==
- Ghalghai
- Durdzuks

== Bibliography ==
- Генко, А.Н. (1930). "Из культурного прошлого ингушей" [From the cultural past of the Ingush]. Записки коллегии востоковедов при Азиатском музее [Notes of the College of Orientalists at the Asian Museum] (in Russian). Vol. 5. Ленинград: Издательство Академии наук СССР. pp. 681–761.
- Шавхелишвили, А.И. (1992). Грузино-Чечено-Ингушские взаимоотношения (С древнейших времен до конца XVIIIвека) [Georgian-Chechen-Ingush relations (From ancient times to the end of the 18th century)] (in Russian). Тбилиси: Мецниереба.
- Мальсагов, Д.Д. (1959). "О некоторых непонятных местах в «Слове о полку Игореве»" [About some obscurities in the Tale of Igor's Campaign]. Известия Чечено-Ингушского научно-исследовательского института истории, языка и литературы [News of the Chechen-Ingush Research Institute of History, Language and Literature.] (in Russian). Vol. 1. Грозный.
- Мальсагов, Д.Д. (1933). "О постановке изучения Чечено-Ингушского фольклора" [On the organization of the study of Chechen-Ingush folklore]. Журнал «Революция и Горец». №5 (in Russian). Ростов.
- Яковлев, Н. Ф. (1925). Ингуши [The Ingush] (in Russian). Москва: Типография Госиздата „Красный Пролетарий“. pp. 3–134.
- Bergé, A.P. (1859). Чечня и Чеченцы. Тифлис – via Библиотека Президента РФ.
- Eremian, S.T. (1973). ""Աշխարհացոյցի" սկզբնական բնագրի վերականգնման փորձ" [An Attempt at Restoring the Original Text of „Aškharhacoyc"]. Patma-Banasirakan Handes. 2: 261–274 – via Pan-Armenian Digital Library.
