= Mongol invasions of Chechnya and Ingushetia =

Invasions of the territory of modern Durdzuketia

Mongol invasions of Durdzuketia
- Part of the Mongol invasions and conquests
Date	1222-1395
Location	Central and North Caucasus
Result	Durdzuks victory
Territorial changes	Mongol Empire gains control of the lowlands

Belligerents
Mongol Empire	Durdzuketia; Simsim; Alania; Zichia; Lezgins

Commanders and leaders
Subutai; Jebe; Möngke Khan	Ors Ela; Botur

During the 13th century, the Mongol Empire launched two invasions of the territory of modern Chechnya and Ingushetia, which included the lands of Alania in the west, Simsir in the northeast, and the Georgian-allied polity of Durdzuketia in the south. The Mongols inflicted widespread death and destruction on the Durdzuks, but also greatly shaped the people they became afterward. The invasions are among the most significant occurrences in Chechen and Ingush history, and had long-ranging effects on Chechnya, Ingushetia and their peoples.

== Prelude ==
During what was the late Middle Ages of Western Europe, the Caucasus was invaded by Mongols and their Turkic vassals. The first appearance of Mongol troops in the Caucasus was an arrival of scouts in 1220–1224. Kypchak Turkic peoples – some of which became future affiliates of Genghis Khan – had been invading and settling areas further and further south and west (a process that had continued since the fall of the Khazars), including the fertile river valleys of the Terek and the Kuban. In the 1230s, the Mongols gained rule over the Kypchaks, and turned them into vassals.

The Mongol invasion of Georgia had commenced a year earlier to the invasion of the Vainakh kingdom of Dzurdzuketia. The Kingdom of Georgia was traditionally a strong ally of Dzurdzuketia, but it was unable to help the Durdzuks when it was under the invasion itself.

== Mongol Invasion ==
In 1237, the assault on the North Caucasus, led by Möngke Khan, began. The Mongols launched attacks against the Circassians and the Kingdom of Alania (Alania was a multiethnic kingdom and consisted of many Caucasian peoples; including Durdzuks). Alanian villages in what is now northern Ingushetia, a part of northwestern Chechnya and North Ossetia were completely destroyed. Having consolidated their rule over the western parts of the Terek, the Mongols then moved East along the river to attack the Durdzuk states of Durdzuketia and Simsir (which was less than modern Chechen and Ingush republican control of the Terek, due to the previously superior position of the Alans). Durdzuketia and Simsir were also attacked from the south and east, by the Mongol troops which had recently conquered Derbent, capital of the Lezghins, in modern Dagestan.

The attack on Durdzuketia, already having been commenced, intensified, and the Mongols went as far as the highlands in their attacks. Here, too, the Dzurdzuk proved no match for the arrows and flames of the Mongols, and their villages were totally destroyed. Amjad Jaimoukha states that a majority of the Dzurdzuk people were probably killed by the Mongols. Within a few years of the invasion, Dzurdzuketia was history, but its resistant people survived up in the mountains. Adding to the misfortune of the Durdzuks, the Mongols successfully established control over much of the Sunzha river, which was an existential threat to the Ingush people due to their need for the Sunzha's (as well as the Terek's) agriculture to support their population. Those remaining joined their mountainous brethren in the highlands (lowland Circassians fled to the Circassian highlands, Alans to southern parts of Alania, and Dzurdzuks to southern Dzurdzuk territory), fleeing out of lack of an alternative. They regrouped in the mountains and reorganized themselves, planning a counterattack on the Turkic and Mongol invaders. Their goal was to survive both biologically and culturally.

The Dzurdzuks had both the forests and the mountains on their side, and waged a successful guerrilla war.

Jaimoukha cites a writing of Giovanni da Pian del Carpine, a Papal Ambassador to the Mongols, in 1245–1247. He apparently asserted that the Khan's armies had failed to take the mountainous parts of the eastern part of Alania, to which they had been laying siege for 12 years already, because of the persistence of the defenders (who were, according to Jaimoukha, almost certainly Dzurdzuks given their geographical location). William of Rubruck, the emissary of the Kingdom of France to Sartaq Khan (son of Batu) travelled to the Caucasus in 1253. He wrote that the Circassians had never "bowed to Mongol rule", despite the fact that whole fifth of the Mongol armies were at that time devoted to the task of crushing North Caucasian resistance.

== Long-term effects of the Mongol invasions ==
=== Themes in folklore ===
The struggles against much more numerous and well-armed invaders cost much hardship on the part of ordinary people, and these struggles and hardships became an important part of the folklore of the modern Chechen and Ingush. One particular tale recounts how the former inhabitants of Argun, during the first invasion and the surrounding area held a successful defense (waged by men, women and children) of the slopes of Mount Tebulosmta, before returning after that to reconquer their home region. Amjad Jaimoukha notes that many of the tales are, in fact, coincident with historical accounts by Western travelers such as Pian de Carpine who reported that in 1250 a part of Alans had defended a mountain for 12 years. This report has been connected to a Chechen folktale first recorded by I. A. Krasnov in 1967 about an old hunter called Idig who, with his companions, defended a mountain for 12 years against a Mongol-Tatar horde:

The next year, with the onset of summer, the enemy hordes came again to destroy the highlanders. But even this year they failed to capture the mountain, on which the brave Chechens settled down. The battle lasted twelve years. The main wealth of the Chechen - livestock - was stolen by the enemies. Tired of the long years of hard struggle, the Chechen, believing the assurances of mercy by the enemy, descended from the mountain, but the Mongol-Tatars treacherously killed the majority. This fate was escaped only by Idig and a few of his companions who did not trust the nomads and remained on the mountain. They managed to escape and leave Mount Dakuoh after 12 years of siege.

— Amin Tesaev, The Legend and struggle of the Chechen hero Idig (1238–1250)

=== End of Dzurdzuk statehood and of the feudal system ===
However, fierce resistance did not prevent the utter destruction of the state apparatus of Dzurdzuketia. Historical and state documents (mainly written in Georgian script) were also destroyed in mass amounts. As Amjad Jaimoukha puts it, "the historical link of times and cultures was broken". The feudal system of vassals and lords also fell into shambles. The contribution of men, women, and children of all classes, paired with the destruction of the feudal system during the war, rich and poor, also helped the Vainakh develop a strong sense of egalitarianism, which was one of the major causes of the revolt against their new lords after the end of the Mongol invasions.

=== Religious implications ===
Pagan sanctuaries as well as the Orthodox Christian churches in the south were utterly destroyed. Under the conditions of the invasion, Christianity was unable to sustain itself in Ingushetia, and as its sanctuaries and priests fell, those who had converted reverted to paganism for spiritual needs. As a result, "neo-paganism" gained in ascendance, as many new pagan temples were built, while Orthodox Christian churches were converted. The Malkhi, Lam-Aekkhii, and Kist clans, which reside in southern areas, however, remained Orthodox Christian.

=== Cultural effects ===
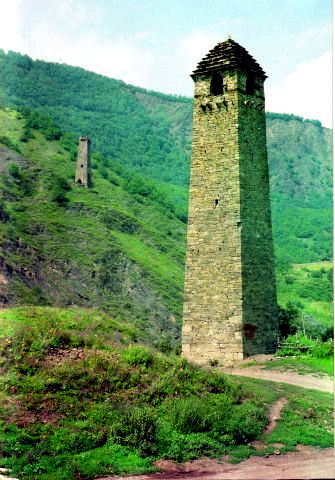
Military tower in Chanta

The utter destruction of the Durdzuks' statehood, their lifestyle (and in the south, their religion), and much of their knowledge of history caused them to rebuild their culture in many ways. The population developed various methods of resistance and much of their later lifestyle during the resistance to the Mongols and in between the two wars. The clan system mapped onto battlefield organization. Guerrilla tactics using mountains and forests were perfected. It was during the Mongol invasions that the military defense towers that one associates today with the Vainakh population (see Nakh architecture) came into being. Many served simultaneously as homes, as sentry posts, and as fortresses from which one could launch spears, arrows, etc. The overcrowding and lack of arable land caused the Chechens to devise new agricultural methods for the highlands including terracing plots and introducing soil.

During the period after the invasions, due to contacts between the Durdzuks and Mongol and Turkic populations, there was a low degree of Mongolian cultural influences dating back to the period. The period where the Durdzuk state of Simsir was a tribute to the Golden Horde (during the fourteenth century and ending in 1395 when Simsir was destroyed by Timurlane because of this alliance) is thought by Amjad Jaimoukha to be the origin of the custom of `amanat, whereby the children of nobles were given as pledged hostages. Such children were sent to the Khanate's court, where they learned the Mongol language, and they could be put to death or enslaved if the Golden Horde desired. This custom later became associated with the giving of hostages to cement pledges across the North Caucasus.

The concept of mythical beast known as the "almaz" or "hun-sag", an evil forest creature with enchanted hair, also dates to Mongol influence (the same is true for the Circassian almesti) with the word almaz being a loan from Mongolian where it originally meant "forest-man"; Jaimoukha also proposes that the Mongol name may have become used in the place of a native name during the sojourn of the Golden Horde over Simsir.

=== Land conflicts with the Nogai over the rivers ===
After defending the highlands, the Chechens attacked Mongol control of the lowlands (after both Mongol invasions had occurred). Much of this area still had nominal Chechen owners (as per the clan system which acknowledges the ownership of a piece of land by a certain teip), even after generations upon generations of not living there. Much was retaken, only to be lost again due to the second invasion. After that, the Chechens managed to take most (but not all) of their former holdings on the Sunzha, but most of the Terek remained in Kypchak hands.

The conflicts did not stop, however, as there were clans that had ownership of lands now inhabited by Turkic peoples, meaning that if they did not retake the lands, they would lack their own territory and be forever reliant on the laws of hospitality of other clans, doing great damage to their honor. Conflicts between Nakh and Turkic peoples originated from the Mongol invasions when Dzurdzuks were driven out of the Terek and Sunzha rivers by Turco-Mongolian invaders (the Nogais) and continued as late as the 1750s and 1770s. After that, the conflict was with newer arrivals in northern Chechnya: the Cossacks.

=== End of the Chechen-Georgian alliance and later replacement ===
Political map of the Caucasus in c. 1300

As the Georgian-allied state of Dzurdzuketia was destroyed, so was the alliance the Dzurdzuks had with the Georgians – the 13th century saw the end of it. This meant that when invaded from the north, they found help from other sources. The Chechen feudal state of Simsir, after the First Mongol Invasion (during which its monarchy somehow miraculously survived), allied itself not to Georgia, but to the Golden Horde, and even nominally converted to Islam, when faced with the threat of invasion. This underlines the causes for the later conversion of the Chechens to Islam in the 16th to 19th centuries, in order to secure the sympathy of the Ottoman Empire and the rest of the Muslim world in their conflict with the Christian state of Russia.

== See also ==
- Mongol invasions of Georgia
- History of Chechnya
