= Shabashka =

Within the second economy of the Soviet Union, shabashka (‹The template Lang-rus is being considered for deletion.› Russian: шабашка, IPA: [ʂɐˈbaʂkə]) was semi-official seasonal work. The word ultimately derives from "shabbat" and literally means "work in free time". A person engaged in shabashka is called a shabashnik (Russian: шабашник). In the Soviet era it was commonly work off the books, and the tradition continued in many post-Soviet states. In modern times, the term refers to any kind of work outside primary, official employment, a concept similar to "moonlighting"

A common form of shabashka was construction works in kolkhozes and sovkhozes which, unlike industrial enterprises had a certain amount of freedom with cash flow and could pay the workers in cash, often unofficially. Since the official enterprises operating in agricultural sector (Межколхозстрой, etc.,) did not have sufficient capacity, kolkhozes and sovkhozes had right to contract so-called "temporary work collectives".

In many cases shabashka work had an official status, and the shabasniks had a confirmation of their employment in their trudovaya knizhka (employment record book).

There were two categories of shabashniks. One of them were non-working class city dwellers: scientists, engineers and students.

Another were migrant workers from republics of Caucasus and Central Asia with excess of workforce. In the modern times, these migrants are called гастарбайтеры (gastarbeiter) in Russian.

The style of payment for the job was so-called "аккордно-премиальная" (piecework/bonus): total payment for the whole job done plus bonus for beating the schedule.
