= Tebulosmta =

Mountain in Georgia and Russia

Mount Tebulosmta
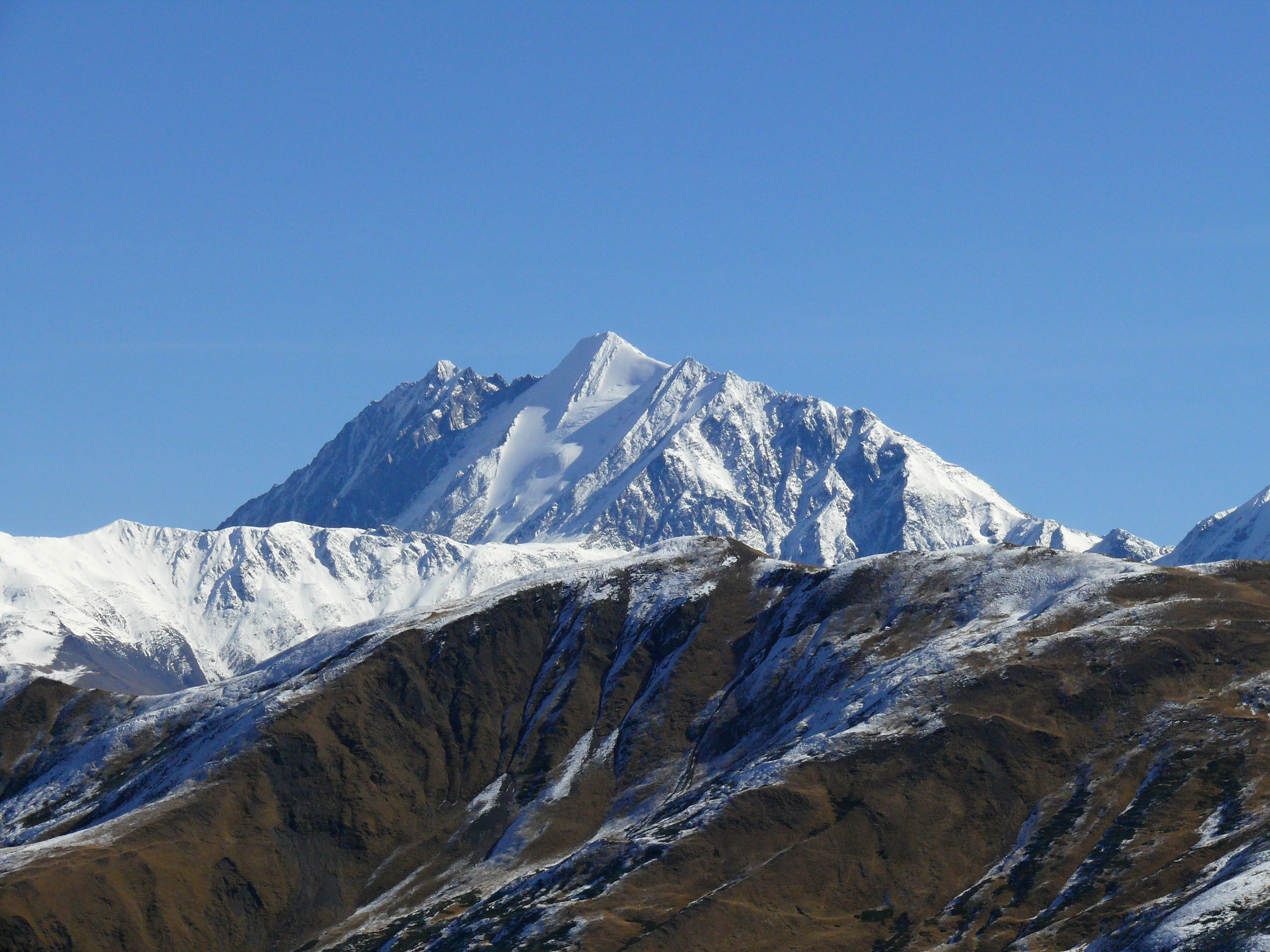

Highest point
- Elevation: 4,493 m (14,741 ft)
- Prominence: 2,145 m (7,037 ft)
- Isolation: 66.08 km (41.06 mi)
- Listing: Ultra, Ribu
- Coordinates: 42°34′24″N 45°19′03″E

Geography
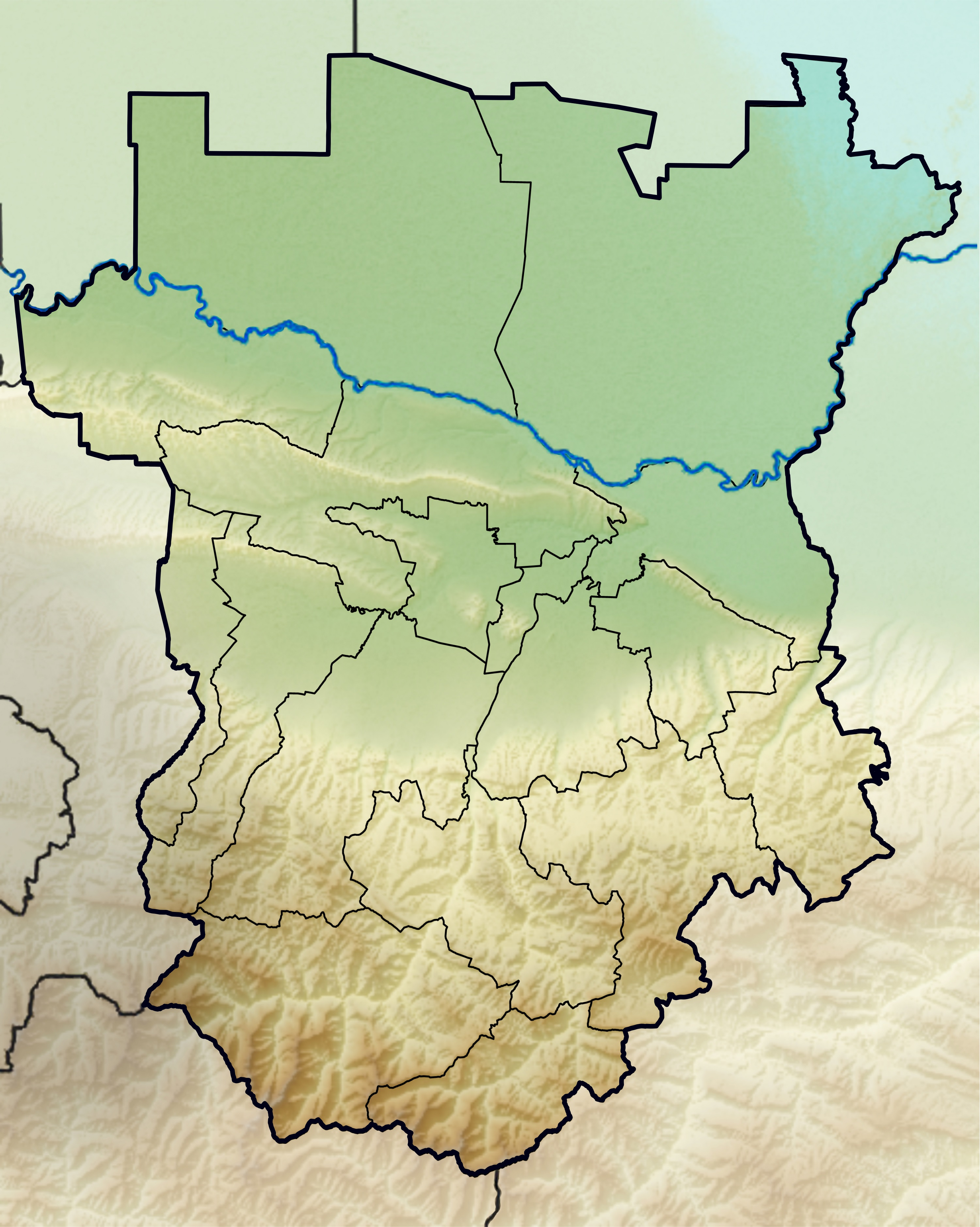
- Location within Georgia Location within Chechnya Location within Kakheti
- Location: Chechnya, Russia; Kakheti, Georgia
- Countries: Russia and Georgia
- Parent range: Lateral Range; Caucasus

Tebulosmta (Note: Chechen: Тӏуьйли-лам, romanized: Thüyli-lam, IPA: [tʼyːlɪ lɑːm]; Georgian: თებულოს მთა, Tebulos mta; Russian: Тебулосмта.) is the highest mountain of the Eastern Caucasus and the highest mountain of the Chechen Republic at an elevation of 4,493 meters (14,737 feet) above sea level. The mountain is located on the border of Georgia and Chechnya to the east of Mount Kazbek. The glaciers of the mountain are not large (the total combined area of all of the mountain's glaciers is 3 square kilometers).

== Name ==
The name Tebulosmta shares a common origin and association with the highland Chechen village of Tebula, which is in proximity to the peak.

== Ski descent ==
The first ski descent of Tebulosmta was completed in May 2025 by an international team of skiers from Chamonix-Mont-Blanc including Tom Grant, Aaron Rolph and Bine Žalohar. They accessed the mountain self-supported from the Georgian village of Khonischala, before climbing and skiing the northwest face.

== See also ==
- List of highest points of Russian federal subjects
- List of European ultra-prominent peaks
- List of ultras of West Asia
