= Amjad Jaimoukha =

Circassian writer, publicist, and historian

Amjad M. Jaimoukha
- Born: Amjad M. Jaimoukha; 1 May 1962
- Died: 7 October 2017 (aged 53)
- Occupation: Writer/Publicist/Historian
- Years active: 1997–2017
- Spouse: Nadia Biesha (1996–2017)
- Children: 1

Amjad M. Jaimoukha (Circassian: Жэмыхъуэ Амджэд, [ʒaməχʷa aːmd͡ʒad]; sometimes quoted as "Амыщ", the Circassian personal name) was a Jordanian Circassian writer, publicist, and historian, who wrote several books on North Caucasian – specifically Circassian and Chechen – culture and folklore.

== Early life ==
Jaimoukha was born to a Kabardian (East Circassian) family from Jordan. His father Mahmoud's family helped to found the modern city of Jerash when they fled their homeland in the 1870s.

== International Centre for Circassian Studies (ICCS) ==
Jaimoukha was the director of the International Centre for Circassian Studies (ICCS), an institute specializing in the dissemination of Circassian culture and folklore. The Center was founded by the famous Circassian writer, film producer, and director Mohydeen Quandour. The principal aim of the ICSS is the development and dissemination of Circassian literature, culture, and folklore. There is a particular emphasis on boosting the status of the Circassian language and on promoting its teaching and use. The ICSS publishes a bilingual journal (in Circassian and English) called "The Hearth Tree".

Jaimoukha has developed a Latin orthography for Kabardian (Eastern Circassian), which is known for its relative simplicity despite the complexity of the language. One of the advantages of this system is its one-to-one correspondence with the current Cyrillic orthography used for Kabardian. Furthermore, software has already been created that can facilitate the transition from one orthography to the other, making it feasible to convert published works in Cyrillic Kabardian into the new orthography, and vice versa.

== Work at the Royal Scientific Society ==
Jaimoukha previously held the position of Assistant President of the Royal Scientific Society (RSS) from 2003 to 2007. During his tenure at the RSS, he published several studies and bibliographic tomes, including 'Scientific Integrity', 'Intellectual Capital Report', and 'Bibliography of the Publications of the Royal Scientific Society'.

== Circassian culture and folklore ==
Jaimoukha was a strong advocate of the revival of Circassian culture and folklore, including defunct genres of art and culture. He wrote several books and articles promoting the Circassian language for the approximate one million people of both Circassian republics in the Northwest Caucasus, and in the diaspora of around 5 million living principally in Turkey, Syria, Jordan, Egypt, Iraq, USA, Germany, France, and the Netherlands. Jaimoukha was vocal in raising awareness of Circassian issues amongst the native population and at a global level. He planned to publish a book on the 2014 Sochi Winter Olympics, held in Circassia.

Jaimoukha was a proponent of North Caucasian unity, and independence from Daghestan in the east to Abkhazia in the west. He advocated Circassian independence in several media outlets. He referred to the historical lands of the Circassians as "Circassia". Despite their linguistic diversity, he argued, the peoples of the North Caucasus share similar traditions, beliefs, and culture. In his work "Thoughts on North Caucasian Federation," the author maps out a plan for the unification of the western part of the region, which includes the historical lands of the Circassians (Adiga), Abkhaz-Abaza [Apswa], and the Ubykh. According to this scheme, the Adiga entities (possibly with the inclusion of the Abaza) would be united into one independent state that might eventually choose to enter into federative arrangements with the already independent Abkhaz and Karachai-Balkar states. This would help to alleviate tensions that could otherwise develop into open conflict between the Kabardians and Balkar in Kabardino-Balkaria and the Karachai and Cherkess in the Karachay–Cherkess Republic. The Adigeans would become more secure and more resistant to the Russian drive to undo their republic.

== Collaborations ==
Principal literary collaborations included work with Nicholas Awde, the editor of the Caucasus World series published by Routledge and co-owner of the publishing house Bennett and Bloom, JonArno Lawson, the writer of several books, and Michel Malherbe, the writer and editor of the Parlons... series published by the French publishing house L'Harmattan. A work on the Adigean dialect of Circassian was scheduled to be published by L'Harmattan in 2010. Jaimoukha contributed five articles (on the Circassians, Kabardians, Karachai, Dagestanis, and Jordan) in Carl Skutsche's three-volume work Encyclopedia of the World's Minorities, published by Routledge in 2004 in New York.

There was close co-operation with the Circassian writer Luba Belaghi (Balagova; publications in Circassian and Russian) in the framework of the publications of the International Centre for Circassian Studies.

== Works ==
- The Circassians: A Handbook (London and New York: Routledge; New York: Palgrave, 2001): It has become the prime reference work on the Circassians. It has been reviewed in more than a dozen international journals."
- The Chechens: A Handbook (Routledge, 2005) with contributions from the Canadian writer and poet JonArno Lawson. The book sheds light on some obscure aspects of Chechen culture and folklore and includes an account of the ancient native religion and beliefs of the Nakhi people (Chechens, Ingush, Kist and Batebi [Tova-Tush]). According to the publishers, it is "the only comprehensive treatment of this subject available in English".
- Kabardian-English Dictionary, Sanjala Press, 1997. (Some 22,000 words, 574 pages. Principally based on: Kardanov (Qarden), B. M. (ed.), КЪЭБЭРДЕЙ-УРЫС СЛОВАРЬ. Kabardino-Russkiy Slovar’ [Kabardian-Russian Dictionary], Kabardino-Balkarian Science and Research Institute, Moscow: State Press of Foreign and National Dictionaries, 1957.
- Parlons tcherkesse: Dialecte kabarde [Let's Speak Circassian: Kabardian Dialect], (Paris: L'Harmattan, 2009) Co-authored with Michel Malherbe. This book is the only treatment of the Kabardian dialect of Circassian in the French language.
- Circassian Culture and Folklore: Hospitality Traditions, Cuisine, Festivals & Music (Kabardian, Cherkess, Adigean, Shapsugh & Diaspora), London: Bennett and Bloom, 2010.
- Circassian Customs and Traditions, The International Center for Circassian Studies, 2009.
- Circassian Religion, The International Centre for Circassian Studies, 2009.
- Circassian Bibliography, The International Centre for Circassian Studies, 2009.
- Circassian Proverbs and Sayings, Sanjalay Press, 2009. (Has some 3,000 entries in Kabardian [in Cyrillic and Latin orthographies] with corresponding English expressions)

Jaimoukha published with the following Western publishing houses: Routledge [RoutledgeCurzon], Curzon, Bennett and Bloom, Palgrave (Macmillan) [St. Martin's Press], and L'Harmattan. He also worked with Sanjalay Press and the International Centre for Circassian Studies.
