= Durdzuks =

Name in the Georgian Chronicles for Vainakh peoples

The Durdzuks (Georgian: დურძუკები, romanized: durdzuk'ebi), also known as Dzurdzuks, was a medieval exonym of the 9th-18th centuries used mainly in Georgian, Arabic, but also Armenian sources in reference to the Vainakh peoples (Chechens and Ingush).

== Identity ==
The Durdzuks have been associated with the ancestors of the modern Chechens, Ingush and Bats. Numerous historians have associated the Durdzuks with mountainous Ingushetia and identified them with the Ingush people. N. G. Volkova, drawing on Georgian historical sources, concluded that the ethnonym originally encompassed both Chechens and Ingush but, by the late Middle Ages, had come to refer specifically to the Ingush. Other historians, including Marie-Félicité Brosset and Sotavov, have also associated the Durdzuks with the Ingush. Some researchers, however, associate the Durdzuks with the Chechens, distinguishing them from the Ingush, who were referred to as Gligvi or Giligii in certain Georgian sources. Other researchers consider the Durdzuks to have been the common ancestors of both peoples.

== Geography ==
In 1745, Georgian geographer Vakhushti of Kartli noted that the country "Durdzuketi consists of Kisti, Durdzuki and Gligvi", placing the first in the vicinity of the Darial Gorge and the latter farther east of the three, bordering Pankisi, Tusheti and Didoeti. Russian ethnologist A. Genko believes that, since the earliest times, the name Durdzuk encompassed the whole of the Northern Caucasus. Georgian historian V. Gamrekeli claims that "Durdzuk" is definitively and, with all its references, uniformly localized between Didoeti-Dagestan in the east and the gorge of the Terek River, in the west. The village Zurzuka in the Vedensky District of Chechnya has been theorized to be connected to the ethnonym Durdzuk. Historians often place the "Gate of the Durdzuks" in the Assa Gorge of Ingushetia, which is a path connecting the North and South Caucasus regions.

== History ==
The supposed eponymous progenitor of the Durdzuks is mentioned in The Georgian Chronicles:

ხოლო შვილთა ზედა კავკასისთა იყო უფალ დურძუკ, ძე ტირეთისი.
And as for upon the sons of Caucasus there was a lord Durdzuk, son of Tiretis.

ხოლო დურძუკ, რომელი უწარჩინებულეს იყო შვილთა შორის კავკასისთა, მივიდა და დაჯდა ნაპრალსა შინა მთისასა, და უწოდა სახელი თჳსი დურძუკეთი.
And as for this Durdzuk, who was one of the most honorable sons of Kavkas, came and set at the mountains, and gave it the name of his as Durdzuketi.

In the Armenian adaptation of The Georgian Chronicles, the Durdzuks defeated the Scythians and became a significant power in the area in the region in the first millennium BC.

According to The Georgian Chronicles, the Durdzuks allied themselves with Georgia, and helped the first Georgian king Pharnavaz I of Iberia consolidate his reign against his unruly vassals. The alliance with Georgia was cemented when King Pharnavaz married a Durdzuk girl.

და მოიყვანა ცოლი დურძუკელთა, ნათესავი კავკასისი.
And married he [Pharnavaz] a Durdzuk wife, a relative of the Caucasus.

The Durdzuks are said to have raided Kakheti and Bazaleti during the reign of Mirian I, who invaded and ravaged the land of the Durdzuks in retaliation. Later on, the Durdzuks are mentioned fighting the Mongols alongside their Georgian allies . Durdzuk soldiers are also mentioned fighting alongside Georgians against the troops of Jalal al-Din Mangburni. Queen Tamar of Georgia was highly esteemed, and the Durdzuks named daughters as well as bridges and other buildings after her.

The Durdzuks are mentioned in the 7th-century work Geography of Armenia by Anania Shirakatsi as the Dourtsk (Armenian: Դուրծկք).

== See also ==
- Mongol invasions of Durdzuketi
- Durdzuk Gates (Ghalghai Koashke)
- Dvals
- Princedom of Simsim
- Peoples of the Caucasus

== Bibliography ==
- Brosset, Marie-Félicité (1847). Quelques remarques sur un livre intitulé: Reise durch Russland nach dem kaukasischen Isthmus, in den Jahren 1836, 1837, 1838, von K. Koch, Doctor der Medicin und Philosophie [Some remarks on a book entitled: Voyages through Russia to the Caucasian Isthmus, in the years 1836, 1837, 1838, by K. Koch, doctor of medicine and philosophy] (in French).
- Eremian, S. T. (1973). ""Աշխարհացոյցի" սկզբնական բնագրի վերականգնման փորձ" [An Attempt at Restoring the Original Text of „Aškharhacoyc"]. Patma-Banasirakan Handes (in Armenian). 2: 261–274.
- Genko, A. N. (1930). "Из культурного прошлого ингушей" [The past of the Ingush]. Notes of the College of Orientalists at the Asian Museum (in Russian). 5: 681–761.
- Goldstein, A. F. (1977). Башни в горах [Towers in the mountains] (in Russian). Moscow: Soviet Artist. OCLC 5877029.
- Kakabadze, S. S. (1967). Грузинские документы Института народов Азии АН СССР [Georgian documents of the Institute of Asian Peoples of the USSR Academy of Sciences] (PDF) (in Russian). Moscow: Nauka. OCLC 2892964.
- Klaproth, Julius Heinrich (1814). Reise in den Kaukasus und nach Georgien unter nommen in den Jahren 1807 and 1808 [Journeys to the Caucasus and Georgia made in 1807 and 1808] (in German). Halle und Berlin: In den Buchhandlungen des Hallischen Waisenhauses. OCLC 68425758. IA reiseindenkauka01klapgoog.
- Koch, Karl (1843). Reise durch Russland nach dem kankasischen Isthmus in den Jahern 1836, 1837 und 1838 [Journey through Russia to the Caucasian Isthmus in the years 1836, 1837 and 1838] (in German). Vol. 2. Stuttgart: J. G. Cotta. OCLC 1084821911.
- Krupnov, E. I. (1971). Средневековая Ингушетия [Medieval Ingushetia] (in Russian). Moscow: Nauka. OCLC 560931261.
- Piotrovsky, B. B., ed. (1988). История народов Северного Кавказа с древнейших времен до конца XVIII в. [The history of the peoples of the North Caucasus from ancient times to the end of the 18th century]. Moscow: Nauka. ISBN 9785020094864.
- Rapp, Stephen H. (2003). Studies in Medieval Georgian Historiography: Early Texts and Eurasian Contexts. Louvain: Peeters. ISBN 9789042913189.
- Robakidze, А. I., ed. (1968). Кавказский этнографический сборник. Очерки этнографии Горной Ингушетии [Caucasian ethnographic collection. Essays on the ethnography of Mountainous Ingushetia] (in Russian). Vol. 2. Tbilisi: Мецниереба.
- Sotavov, N. A. (1991). Meier, M. S. (ed.). Северный Кавказ в русско-иранских и русско-турецких отношениях в XVIII в. [North Caucasus in Russian-Iranian and Russian-Turkish relations in the 18th century] (in Russian). Moscow: Nauka. ISBN 9785020172739.
- Volkova, N. G. (1973). Этнонимы и племенные названия Северного Кавказа [Ethnonyms and tribal names of the North Caucasus] (in Russian). Moscow: Nauka. OCLC 749094397.
