= Occupation of Balkh (1447) =

Battle of the Timurid Civil Wars

- Part of Timurid Civil Wars
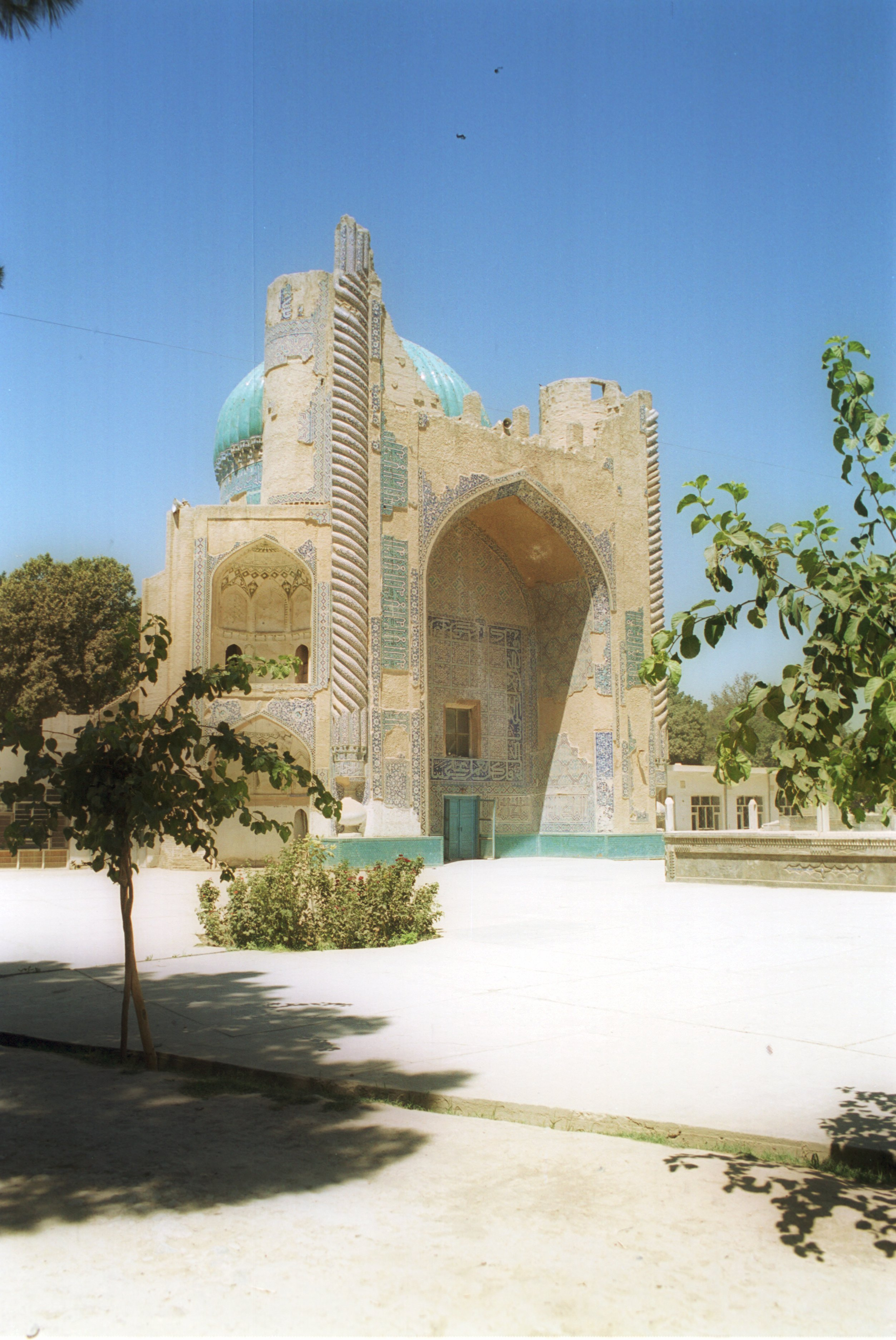
- Sabz Masjid or Green Mosque built by Shah Rukh Mirza &/or Gawhar Shad
Date	1447
Location	Balkh, Afghanistan
Result	Timurids of Samarkand victory

Belligerents
Timurids of Balkh	Timurids of Samarkand

Commanders and leaders
Mirza Abu Bakr (POW) †	Ulugh Beg

With the death of Shah Rukh in 1447 began the long drawn out Second Timurid Succession Crisis. His only surviving heir was his son Ulugh Beg who was at that time viceroy of Central Asia at Samarkand. Gawhar Shad and Abdal-Latif Mirza were with Shah Rukh when he died on his way back to Khurasan from Iran. Abdal-Latif Mirza became the commander of his grandfather's army and in conjunction with his father Ulugh Beg began operations against his cousins. As soon as Ulugh Beg heard of his father's death, he mobilized his forces and reached Amu Darya in order to take Balkh from his nephews. Balkh belonged to Ulugh Beg's brother Muhammad Juki who died in 1444. Balkh was divided among his sons Mirza Muhammad Qasim and Mirza Abu Bakr. However, Mirza Abu Bakr took his older brothers' possessions when Shah Rukh Mirza died. Ulugh Beg summoned Abu Bakr to his court and promised him his daughter in marriage. But while there he had him convicted of plotting against him and imprisoned at Kok Serai in Samarkand where he was later executed. Ulugh Beg then marched on Balkh and took that province unopposed.

== Aftermath ==
The taking of Balkh was a clear signal for all that Ulugh Beg did not recognise the rights of any of his nephews. Next operations though, would be difficult since the other nephews of Ulugh Beg were hardened warriors and sons of his now deceased yet famously able brother Baysunghur Mirza. They were Ala al-Dawla Mirza stationed at Herat; Abul-Qasim Babur Mirza who was at that time in Shah Rukh's army when he died and when Abdal-Latif Mirza took over as commander to which Babur Mirza reacted by plundering the Urdu Bazar (Camp Market) with Khalil Sultan and made a dash for Herat to come under his brother's protection; And finally Sultan Muhammad Mirza who was at Luristan in hiding after his failed revolt against Shah Rukh Mirza but since returned to Fars.
