= Goharshad Mosque =

Mosque in Imam Reza Shrine, Mashhad, Razavi Khorasan, Iran

- مسجد گوهرشاد
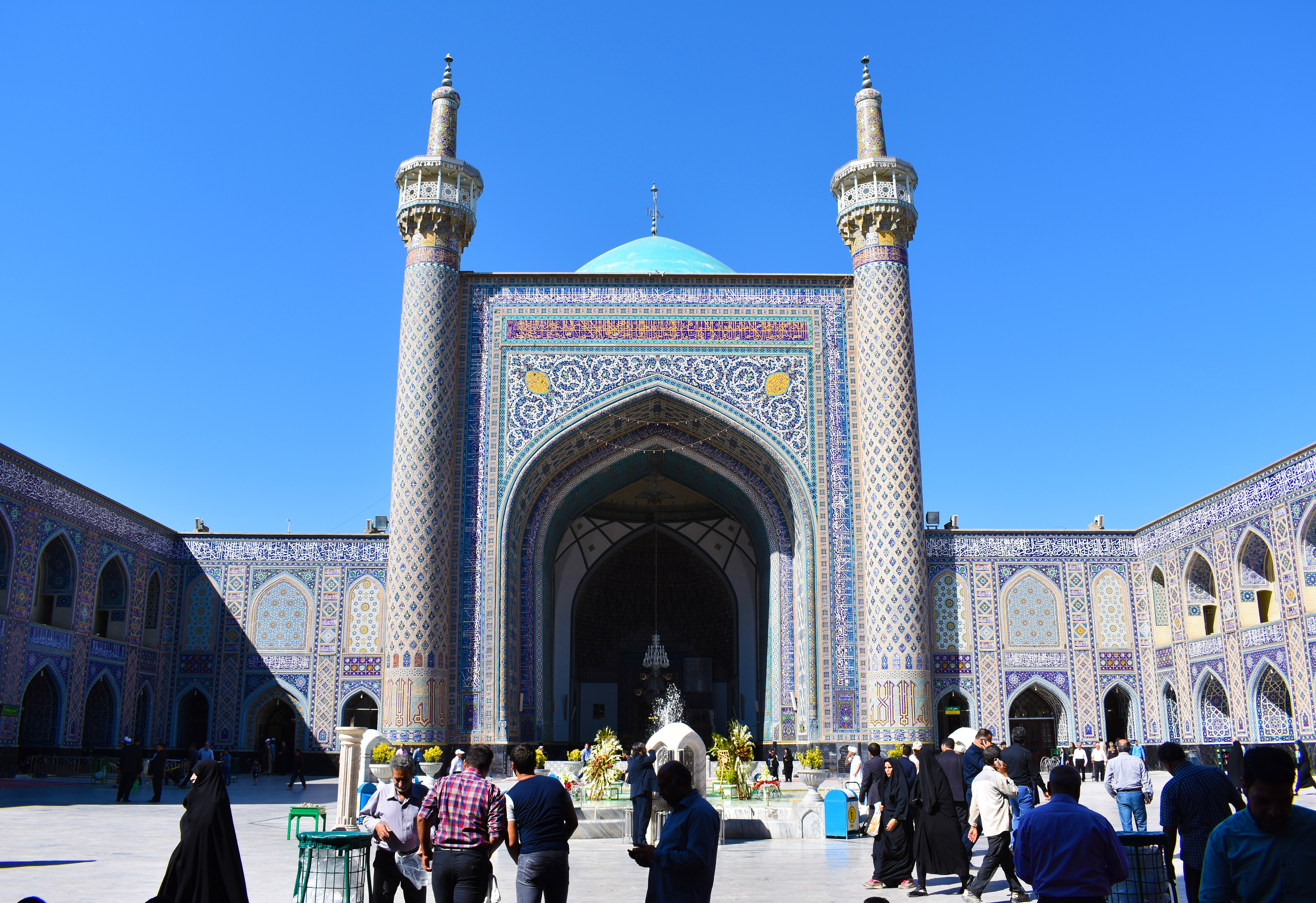
- The monumental maqsura iwan with the dome and minarets

- Location of the mosque in Iran

Religion
- Affiliation: Shia Islam
- Ecclesiastical or organisational status: Friday mosque
- Status: Active

Location
- Location: Mashhad, Razavi Khorasan Province
- Country: Iran
- Administration: Astan Quds Razavi
- Coordinates: 36°17′15″N 59°36′53″E

Architecture
- Architect: Ghavameddin Shirazi
- Type: Mosque architecture
- Style: Timurid
- Founder: Empress Goharshad
- Groundbreaking: 1418 CE
- Completed: c. 1430 CE

Specifications
- Dome: One
- Dome height (outer): 43 m (141 ft)
- Dome dia. (outer): 15 m (49 ft)
- Minaret: Two
- Minaret height: 43 m (141 ft)
- Site area: 10,000 m^{2} (110,000 sq ft)
- Materials: Bricks; plaster; concrete; ceramic tiles; mosaics; marble

The Goharshad Mosque (Persian: مسجد گوهرشاد, romanized: Masjed-e Guharshād; Arabic: مسجد كوهرشاد) (Note: Also known as the Gowharshad Mosque, the Gowhar Shad Mosque, and the Gohar Shad Mosque.) is a grand Friday mosque (jāmeh) that is part of the Imam Reza Shrine complex, located in Mashhad, in the province of Razavi Khorasan, Iran. Construction of the mosque commenced in 1418 CE, during the Timurid era, and was completed in c. 1430 CE. Another Gawhar Shad Mosque, built at the same time, is located in Herat.

== History ==
It was built by the order of Empress Goharshad, the wife of Shah Rukh of the Timurid dynasty, and work commenced in 1418 CE, as part of her extensive renovation program for the shrine of Imam Riza.

The double-layered dome of the mosque was severely damaged in 1911 in bombings by troops of the Russian Empire. In the 1960s, the dome of Goharshad mosque was deemed to be in severe structural danger, damages caused by various earthquakes over time, the 1911 Russian bombings, and the attack on the mosque by Reza Shah during the 1935 rebellion required the dome to be rebuilt. By the order of Mohammad Reza Shah, the tiles from the ancient dome were removed in the 1960s and the external shell was dismantled. A new external shell was built and the dome was re-tiled. While such repairs were necessary, they permanently altered the historic identity of the mosque.

== Architecture ==
Located to the south of the mausoleum, accessed through the dar al-siyadah, the mosque is of the familiar four-iwan courtyard form. The depths of the iwans are irregular, a response to the location of existing buildings within which it was inserted. Covering an area of approximately 10,000 square metres (110,000 sq ft), the mosque consists of a large azure dome, two 43-metre-high (141 ft) minarets, four verandas, a sahn with seven big bed-chambers, and a large altar made of a stony dado and mosaic faience shell. The two round minarets rise from the ground and flank the southern iwan, and was an innovation in Persian architecture as minarets in Iran were previously positioned above the parapet. A blue faience dome was rebuilt with poured concrete in the 1960's, above the southern iwan. The convex part of the dome's shell is decorated with an inscription in the Kufic script.

The complete surface of the minarets, walls, and the surrounding colonnades are decorated with fine mosaic and glazed tiles produced in a variety of colors including ultramarine, turquoise, white, clear green, yellow, light yellow, and ebony. The mosque is known for its tile mosaic decoration, an art form that peaked during the Timurid period. On a high base of marble revetment, panels of enamel brick and tilework are arranged in two stories that run around the sahn, capped by a band of calligraphy designed by Baysunghur, a son of Gawhar Shad. Vivid, energetic floral patterns in tile and geometric schemes in brick are used in alternation, emphasizing the strong rhythm around the sahn.

In 1965 a scholar of Persian architecture described the beautiful mosque as the first, and the greatest surviving, Persian monument of the fifteenth century:

Its portal continues the Samarkand style of arch within arch, enriched by a succession of bevels and reveals that give it depth and power. The thick, tower-like minarets, merging with the outer corners of the portal screen, extend to the ground and, together with the high foundation revetment of marble, give the ensemble the impression of solidity necessary to support its exuberant color. The entire court façade is faced with enamel brick and mosaic faience of the finest quality…

— Arthur Pope, Persian Architecture: The Triumph of Form and Color.

== Gallery ==
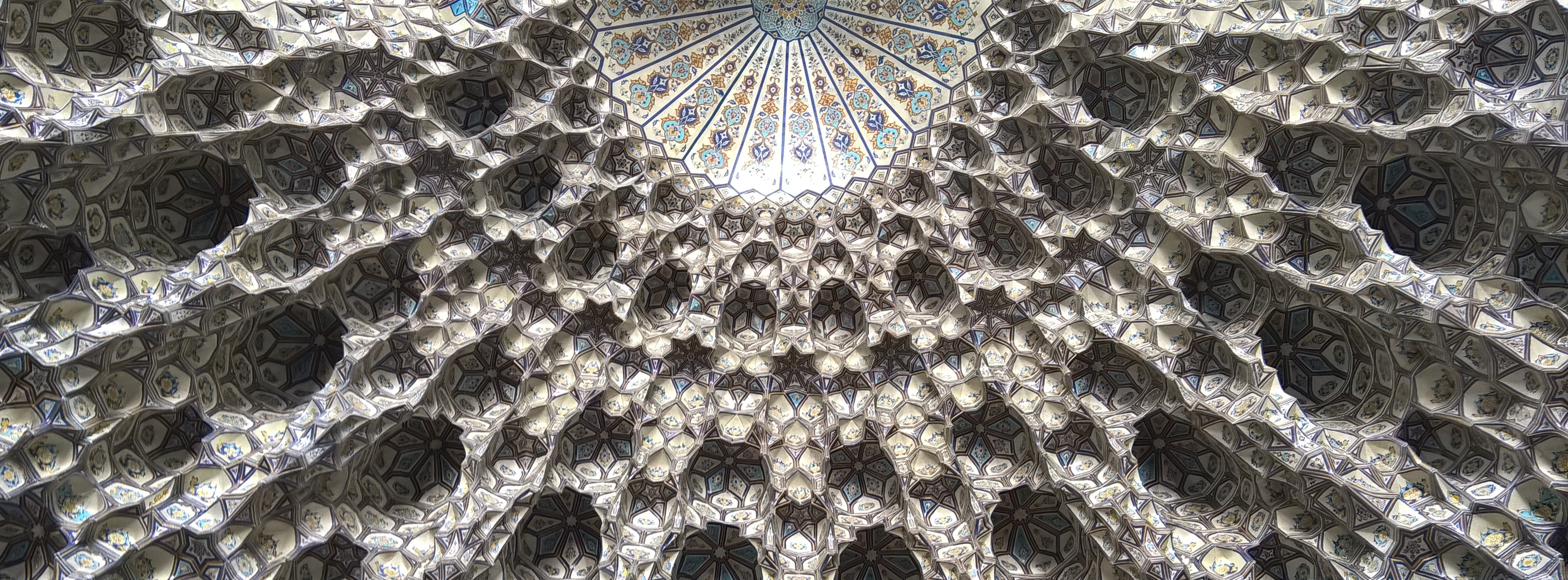

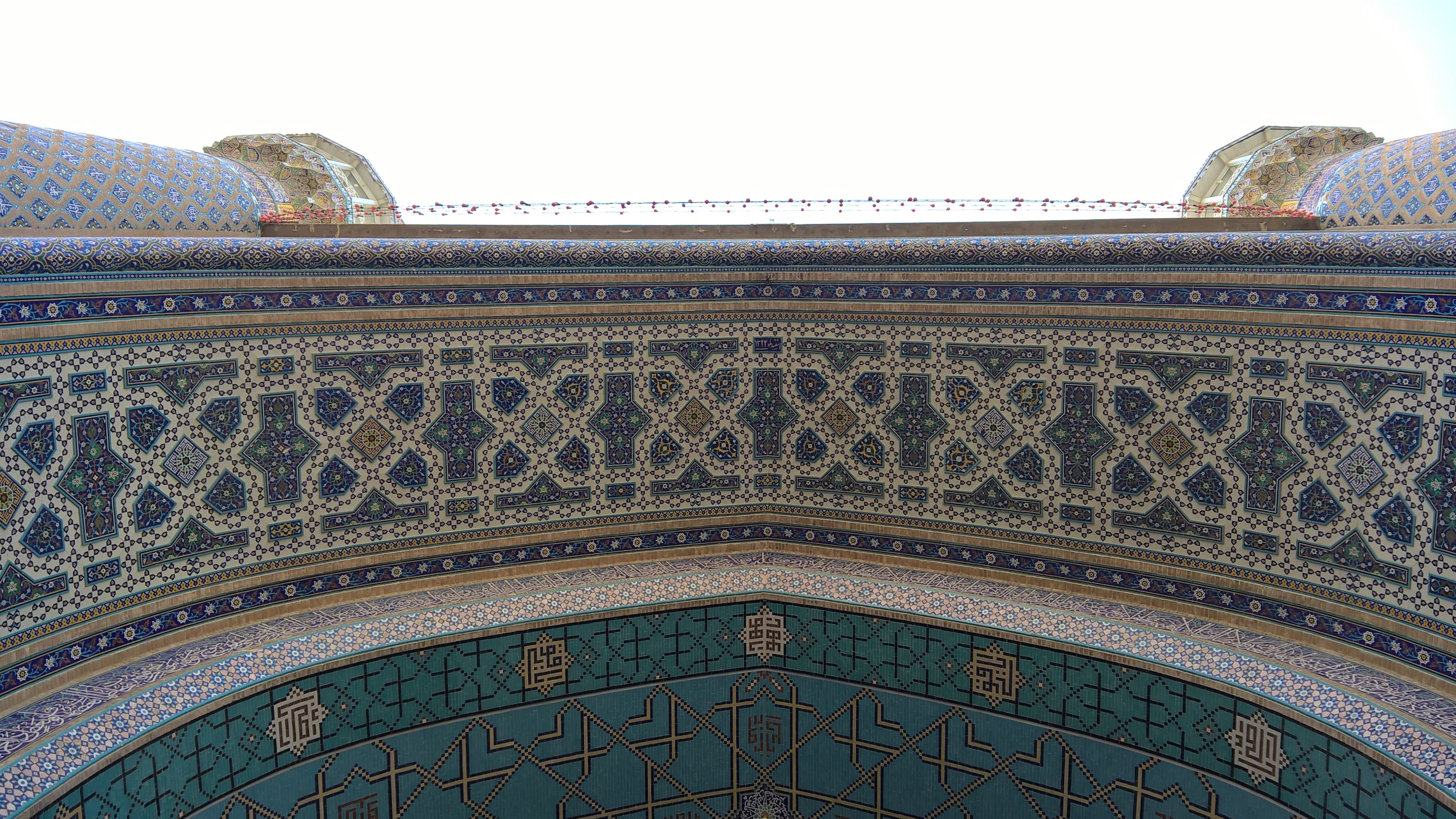

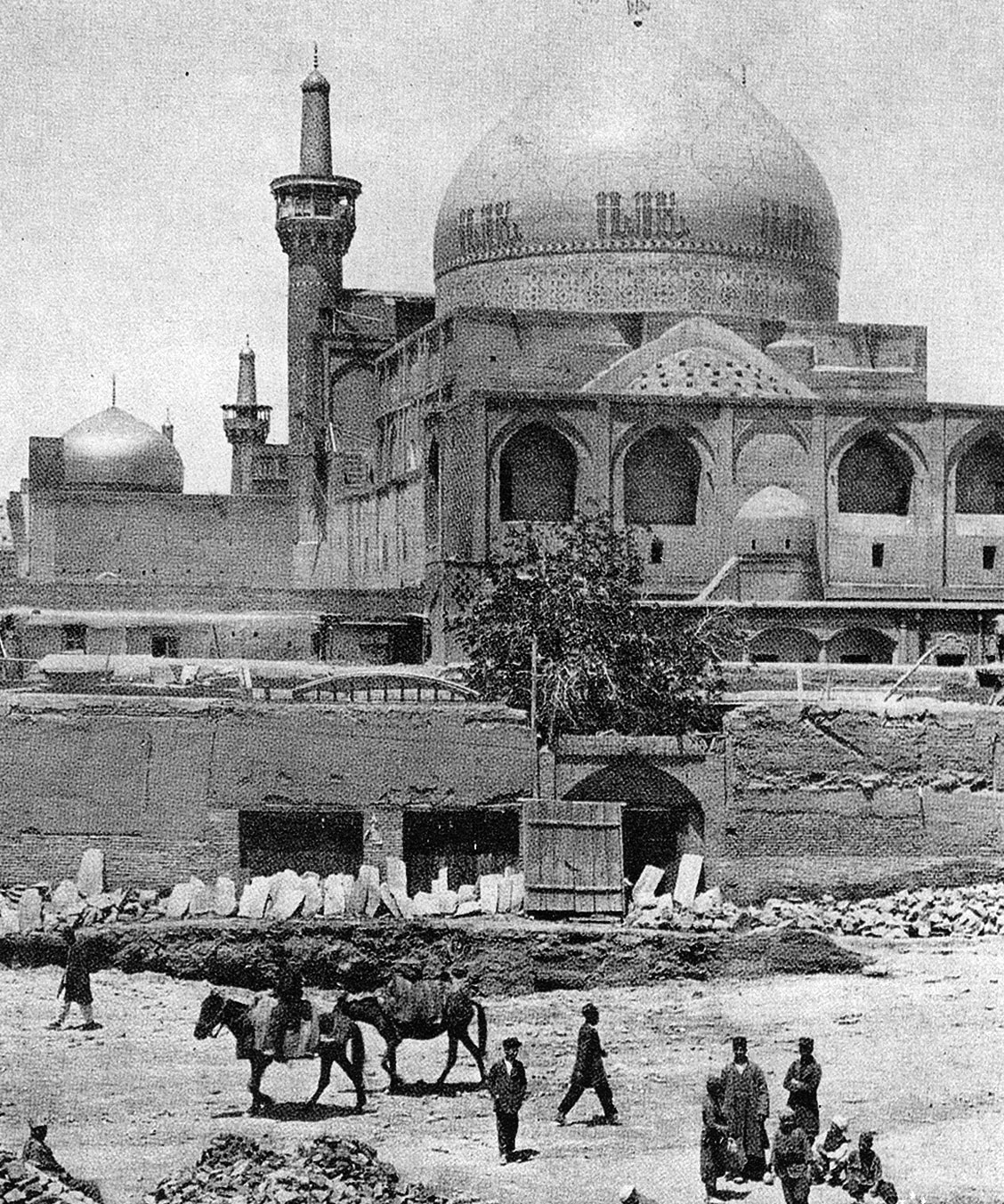

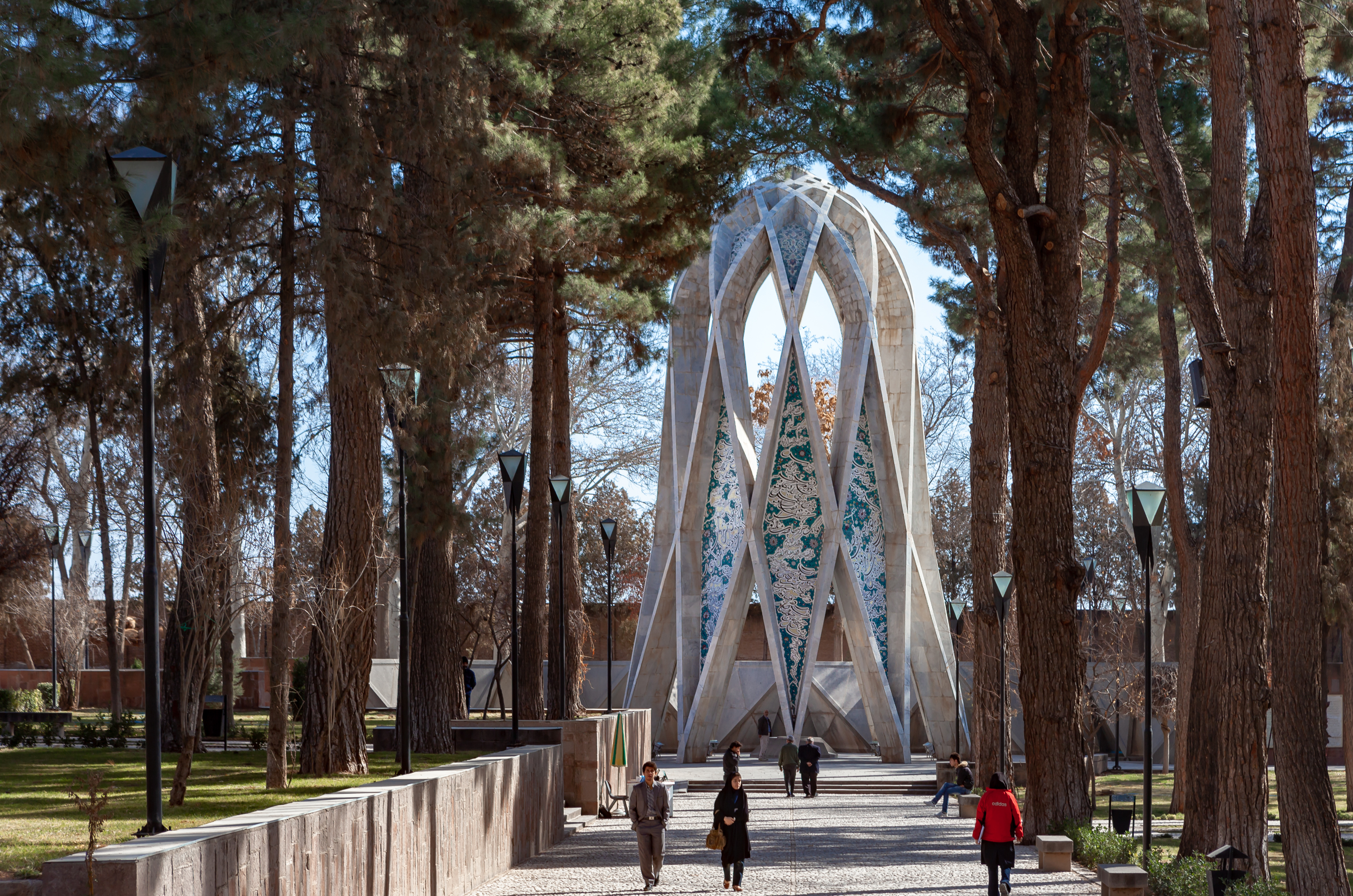

== See also ==
- Shia Islam in Iran
- List of mosques in Iran
- Greater Khorasan
- Ali ar-Ridha
- Goharshad Mosque rebellion
