= Gawhar Shad Mosque =

Former mosque in Herat, Afghanistan

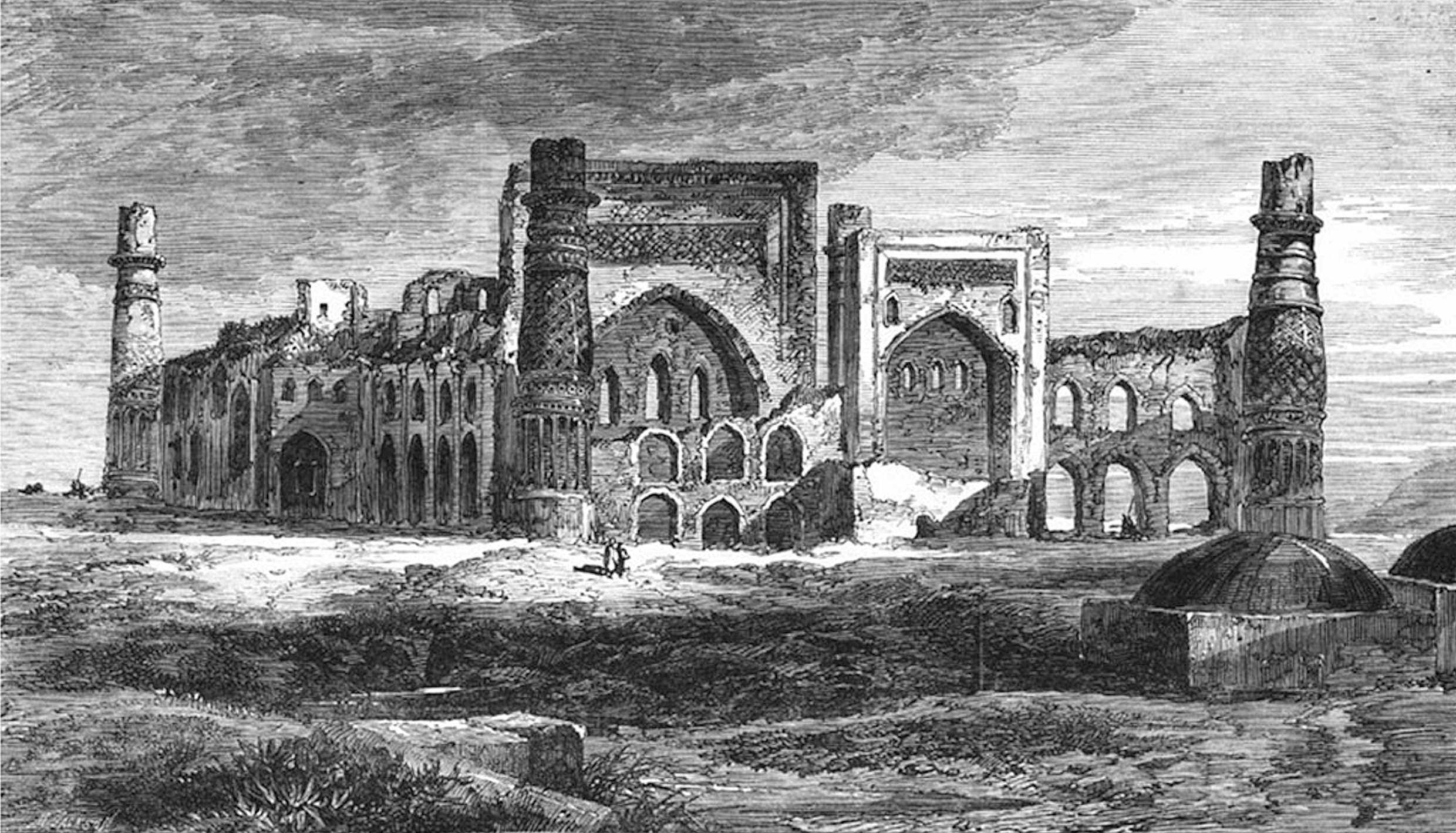
- The mosque viewed from the east in 1863 (by Durand, Illustrated London News)

- Location of the former mosque in Afghanistan

Religion
- Affiliation: Islam (former)
- Ecclesiastical or organizational status: Mosque (1438–1885)
- Status: Closed (ruinous state)

Location
- Location: Musalla Complex, Herat
- Country: Afghanistan
- Interactive map of Gawhar Shad Mosque
- Coordinates: 34°21′21″N 62°11′05″E

Architecture
- Architect: Qavan ud-din
- Type: Mosque
- Style: Timurid
- Founder: Queen Gawhar Shad
- Completed: c. 1438
- Demolished: 1885
- Minaret: Four: (one extant)

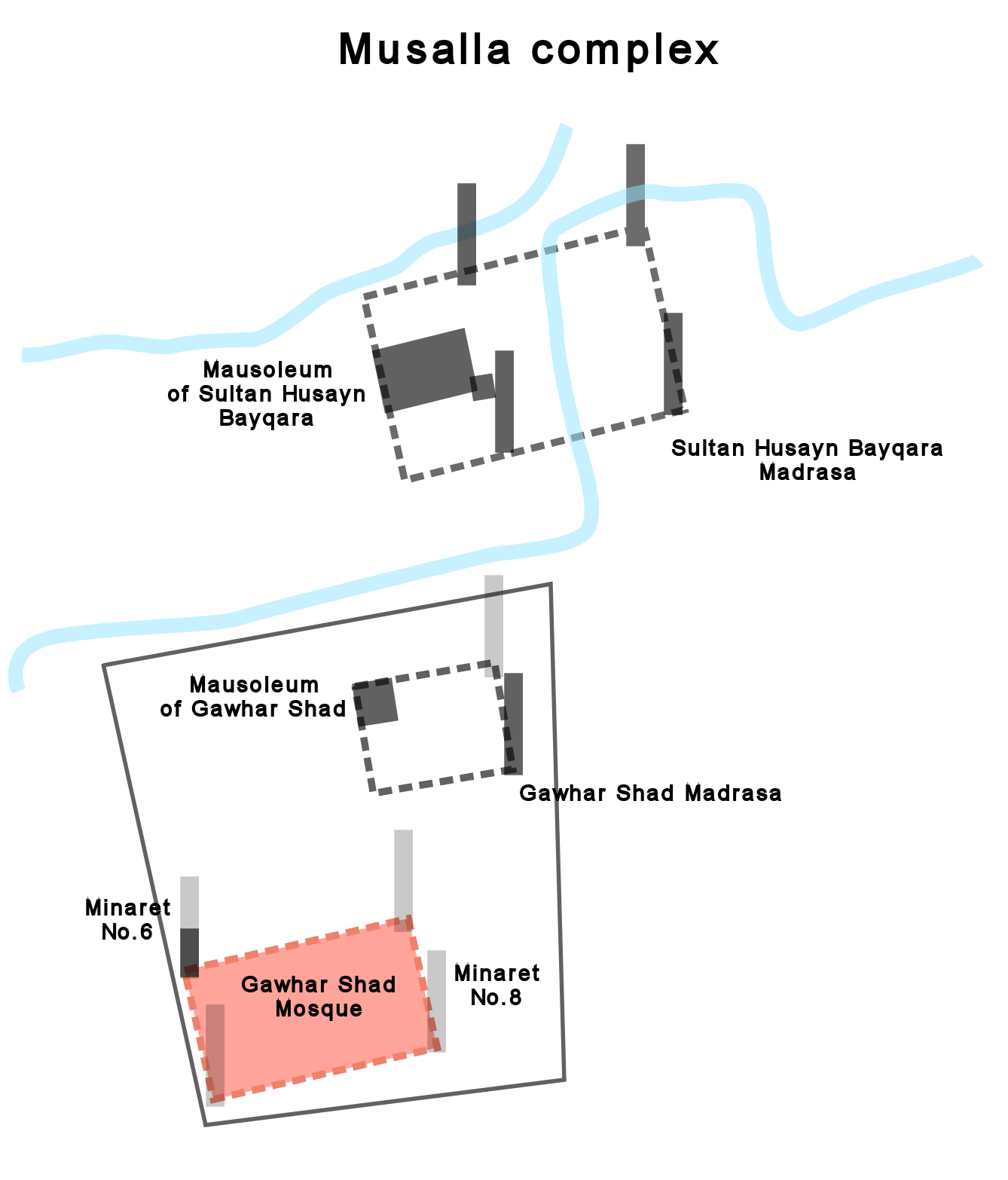
Location of the Gawhar Shad Mosque (in red), in the Musalla complex

The Gawhar Shad Mosque (Masjid-i Jami‘ of Gawhar Shad) is a former mosque, in a ruinous state, located in Herat, Afghanistan. The mosque was built under a commission by Gawhar Shad, the main queen of the Timurid ruler Shah Rukh and is located in the southwestern corner of the Musalla complex. The structure has not operated as a mosque since the latter part of the 19th century.

== Structure ==
The mosque was commissioned by Gawhar Shad, and built by the architect Qavam al-Din b. Zayn al-Din Shirazi, after he had finished the Gawhar Shad mosque in Mashhad in 1418. Construction began in 1417–18, and partial completion was achieved in 1437–38. The mosque measured c. 130 by 74 metres (427 by 243 ft), and was built around a four-iwan structure and crowned by four minarets. The decoration consisted in blue glazed tiles, in a style similar to that of the nearby Gawhar Shad Mausoleum.

The mosque was demolished by Afghan-British troops in 1885, in the Panjdeh incident, in an effort to prevent the potential use of the ruins by invading Russian troops as a defensive structure or protective terrain, and to provide a clear line of sight from the Herat fortress. As of 1928, only two minarets remained in partially good shape: minaret No.8 at the southeast corner, and minaret No.6 at the northwest corner. Today, nothing remains, apart from the half-length ruins of the northwestern minaret No.6, almost without any decoration left.

A few decorative slabs from minaret No.8 have been reused in the Shrine of Khwaja Abd Allah of Herat.

In 2004, UNESCO added the City of Herat, including the entire Musalla complex, to the Tentative List of UNESCO World Heritage Sites.

=== Minaret No.8 (southeast corner) ===
Minaret No.8, the minaret at the southeast corner of the mosque, was still standing in 1928, but has since disappeared. The decorative slabs at the basis have been reused in the Shrine of Khwaja Abd Allah of Herat. Some are also displayed in the Great Mosque of Herat.

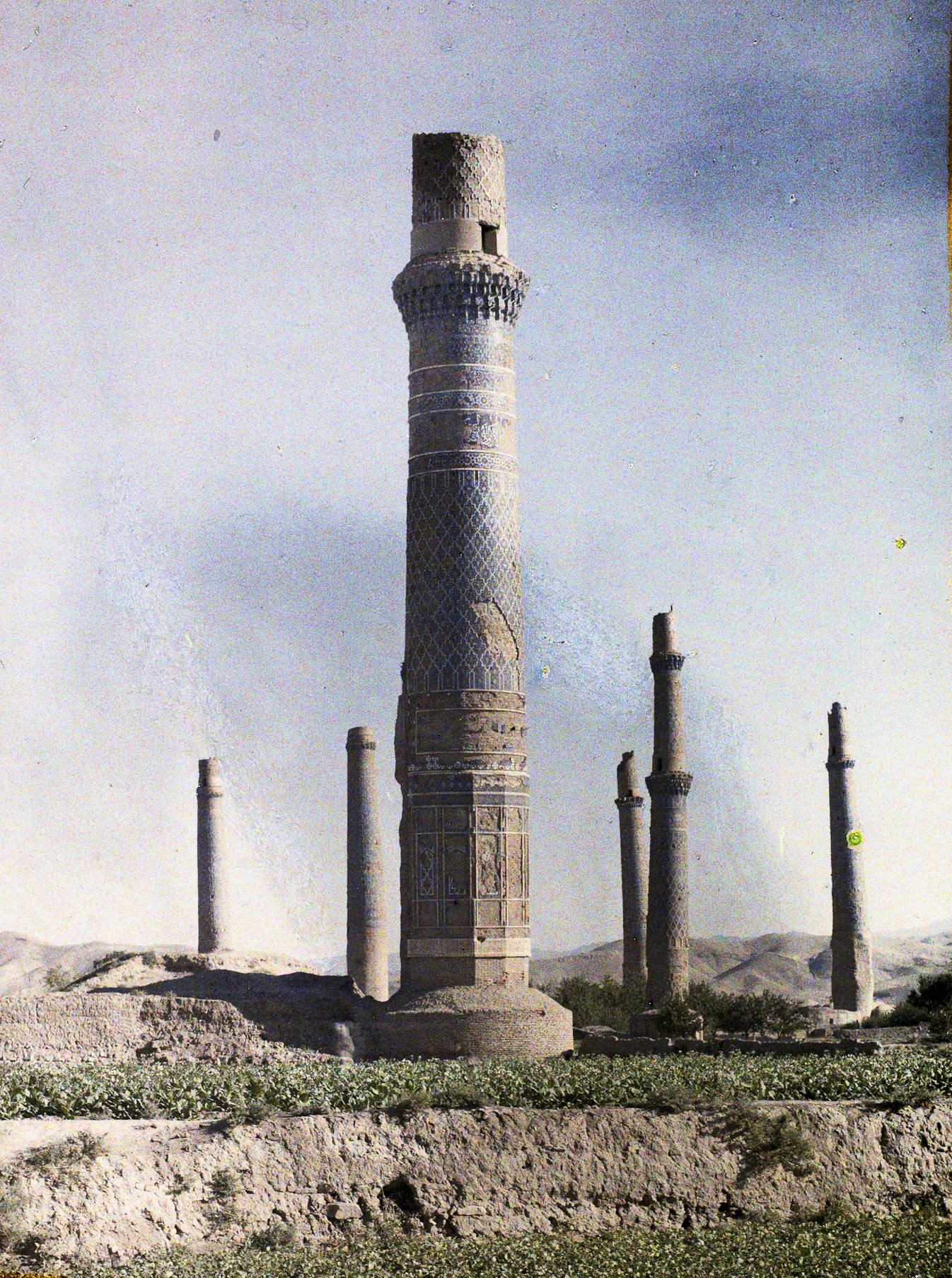
The Gawhar Shad Mosque minaret No.8 (southeast), 1928.

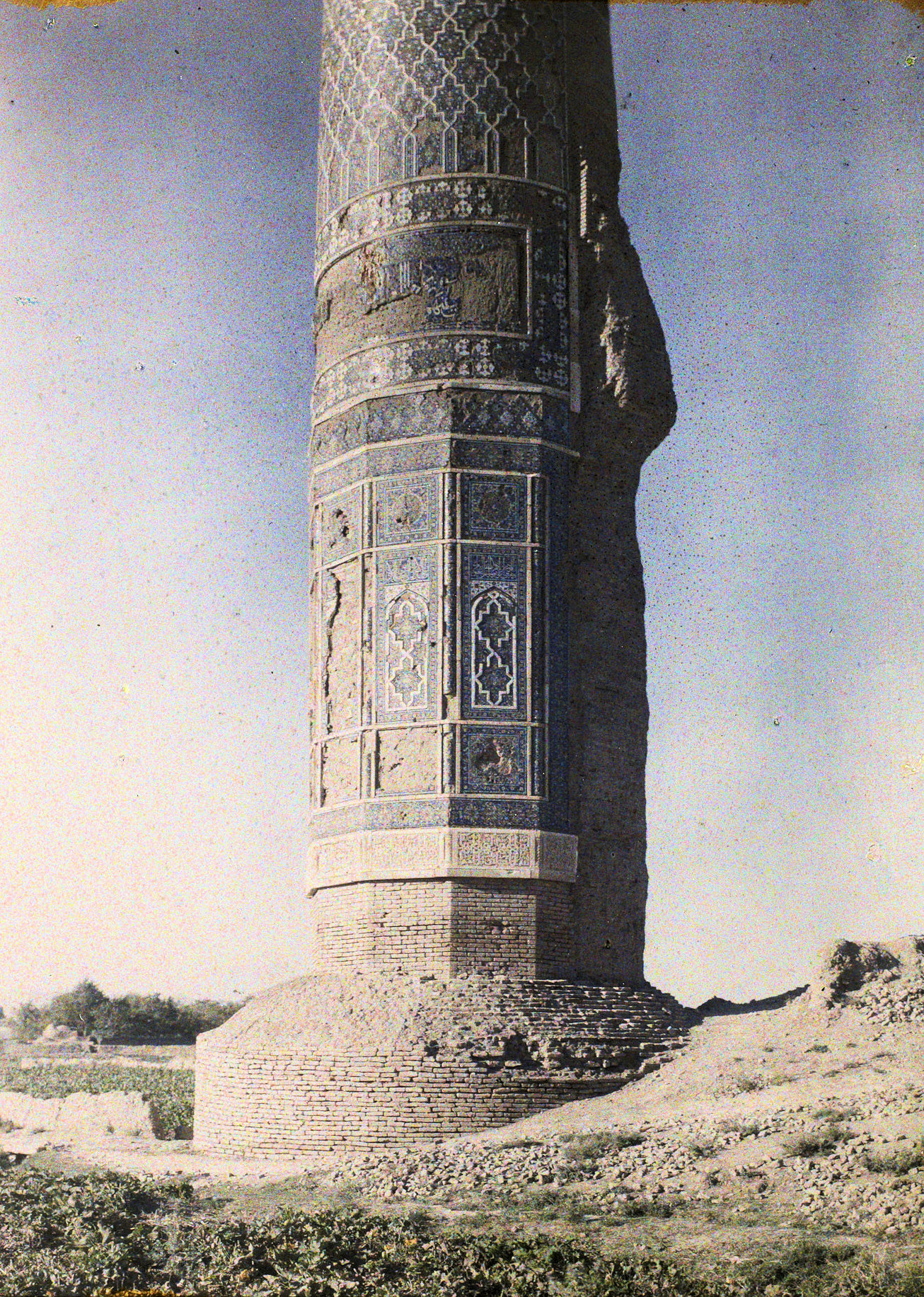
Gawhar Shad Mosque minaret No.8 (southeast), 1928

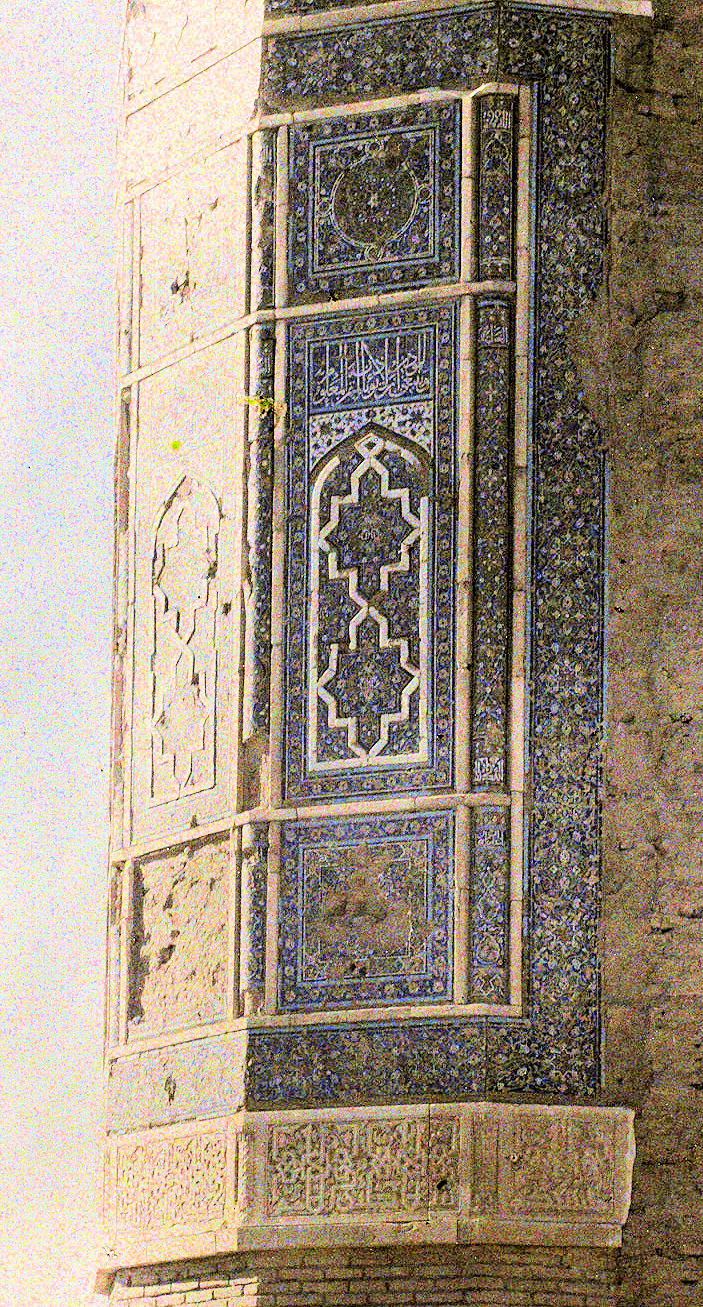
Detail of the mosaics of the minaret No.8 (Southeast), 1928

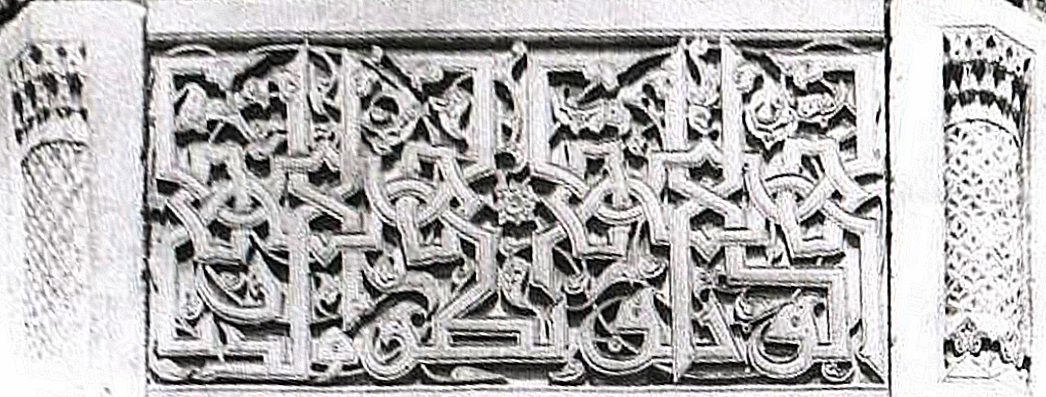
Decorative slab, from the base of minaret No.8.

=== Minaret No.6 (northwest corner) ===
Only a half-length stump remains today of minaret No.6 (at the northwest corner of the mosque), with very little decoration left, damaged by Russian mortar fire in 1985.

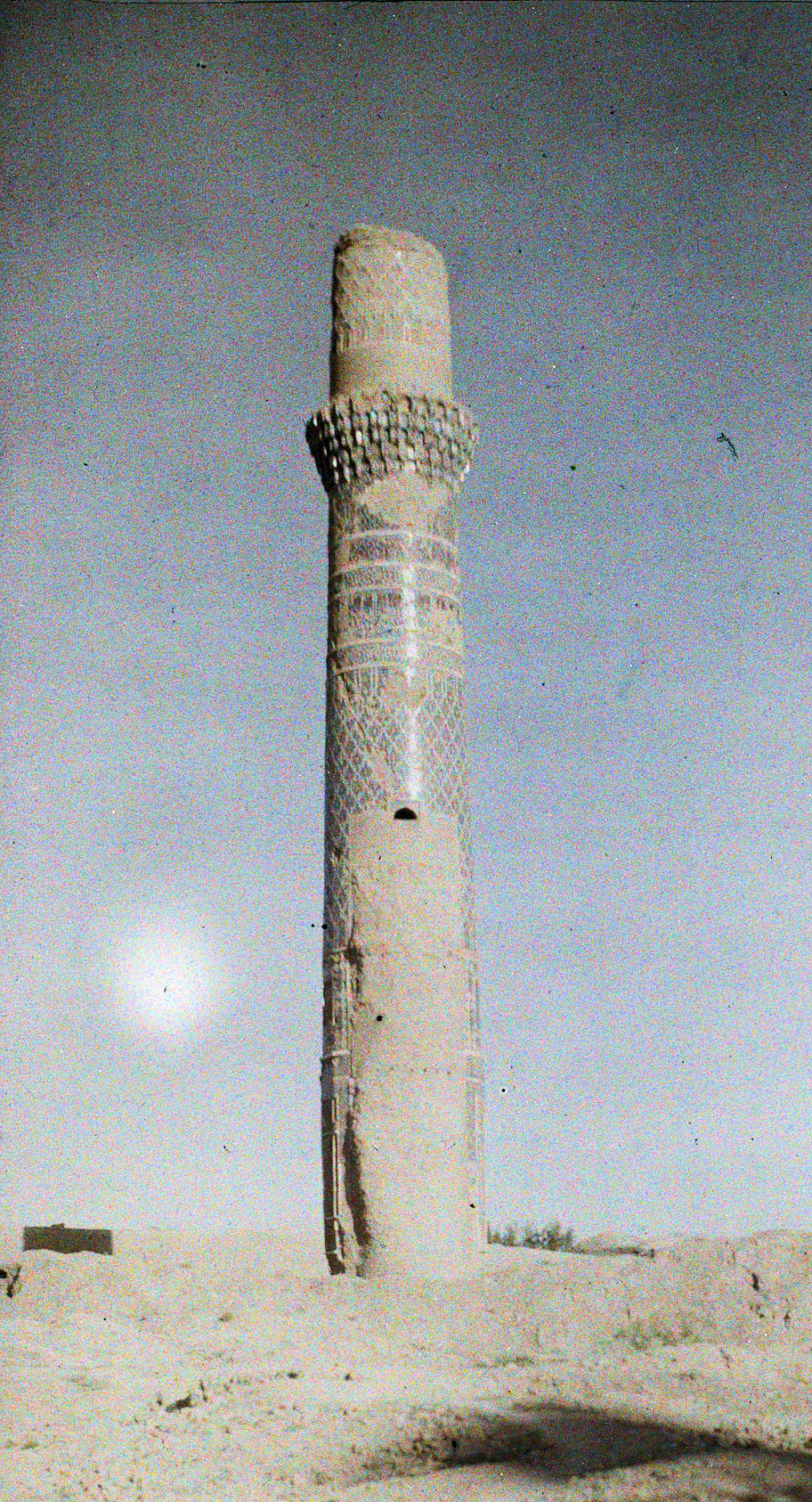
Minaret No.6 (northwest), 1928

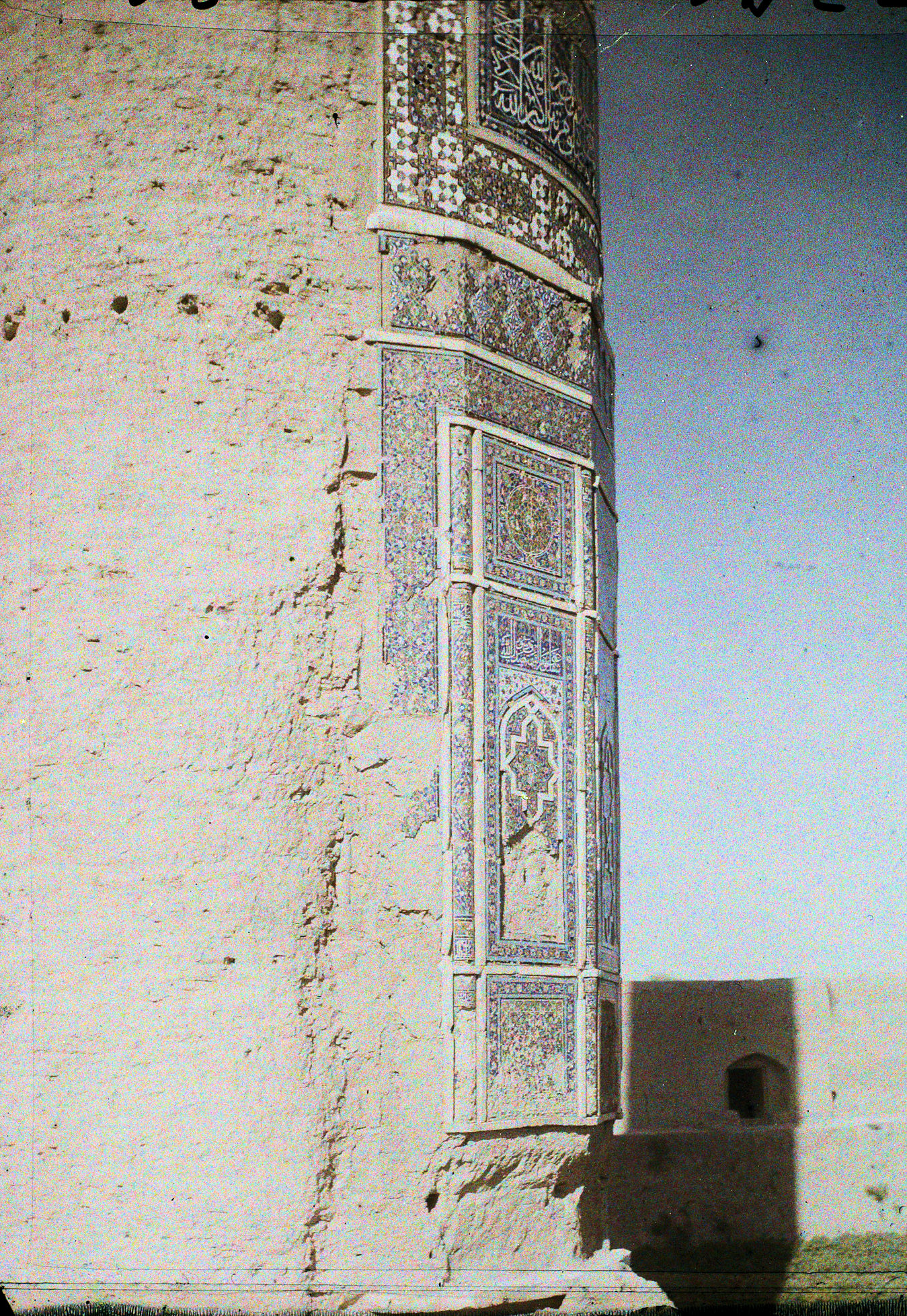
Minaret No.6 (northwest), 1928

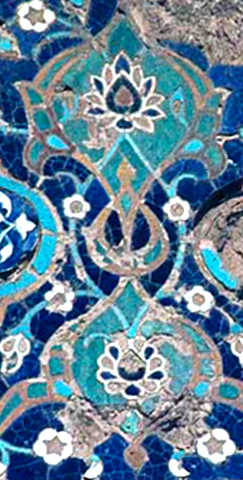
Detail of underglazed ceramic tiles with “blue-and-white” decorations from minaret M6

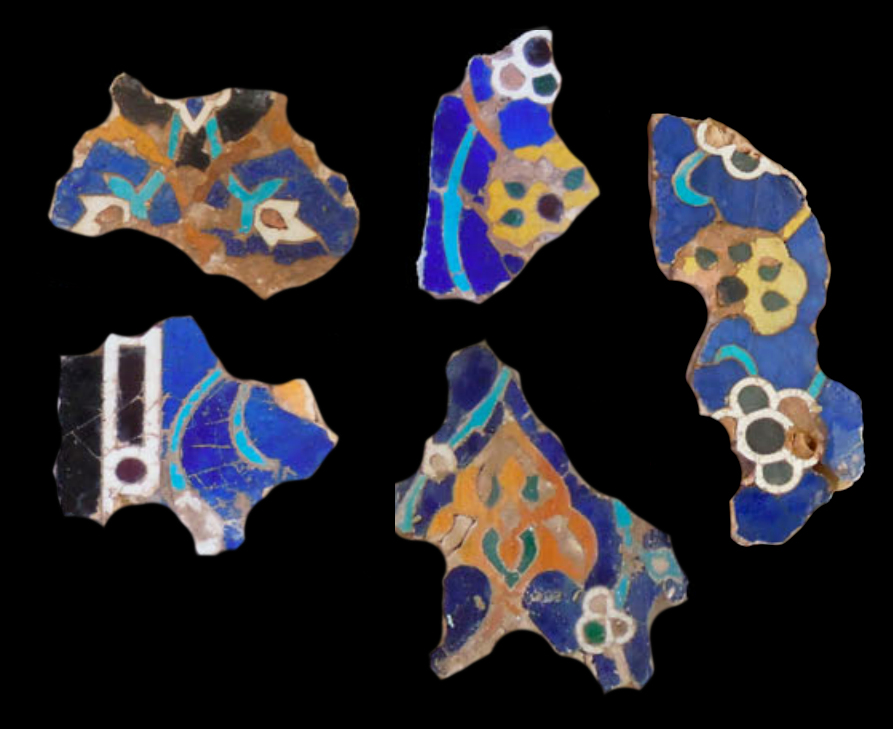
Sherds of mo'araq cut-tile mosaic from minaret M6, Gawhar Shad Mosque (Herat). National Museum of Herat.
