= Muhammad Juki =

Timurid prince (1402–1445)

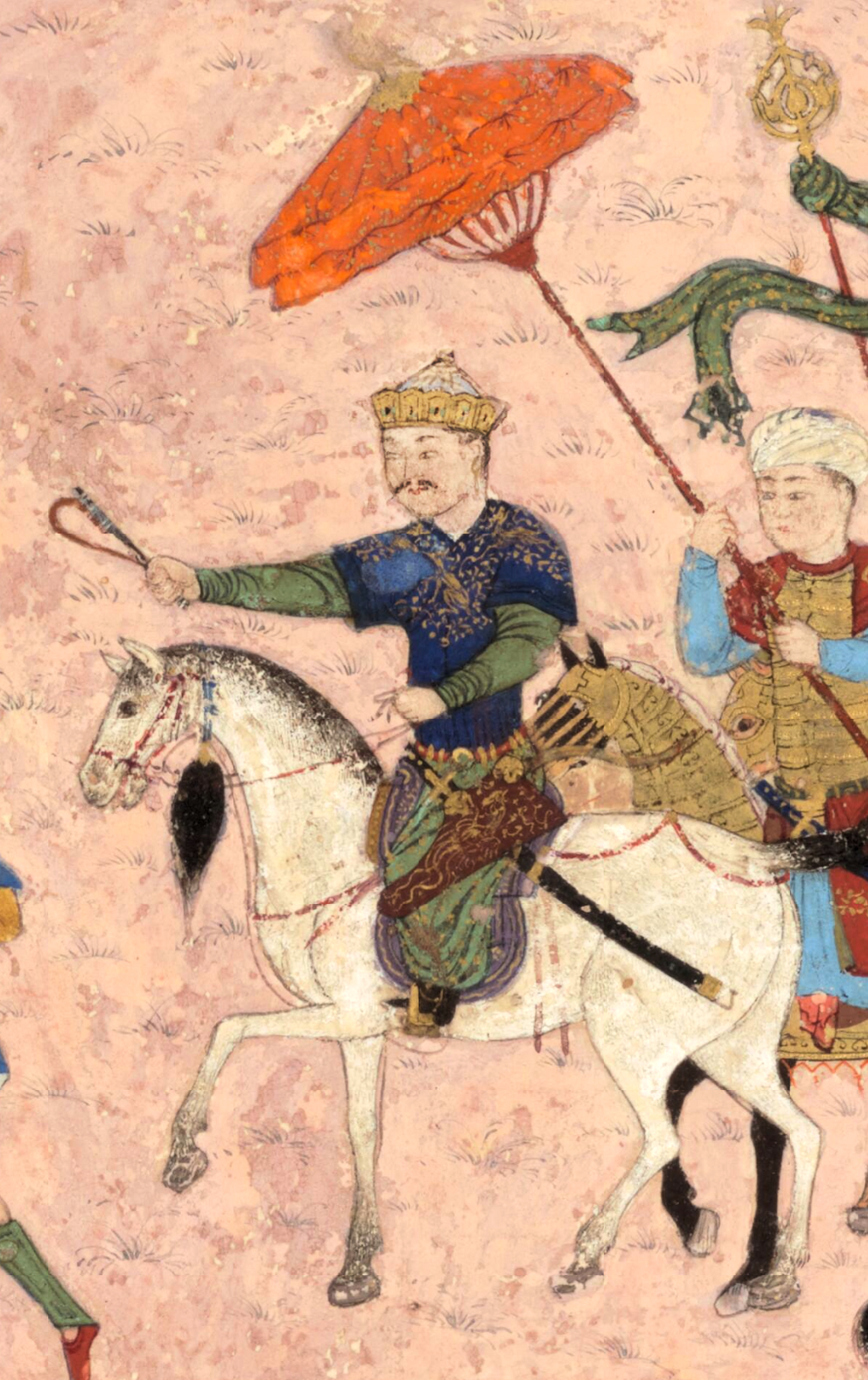
- Contemporary portrait of Timurid ruler Muhammad Juki on horse, 1440-45. Shahnama, Herat (Royal Asiatic Society of Great Britain and Ireland, no. 239).
- Born: 27 April 1402
- Died: 1445 (aged 42–43); Sarakhs, Timurid Empire
- Burial: Gawhar Shad Mausoleum, Herat
- House: House of Timur
- Father: Shah Rukh
- Mother: Gawhar Shad
- Religion: Islam

Muhammad Juki Mirza (1402–1445) was a Timurid prince and a son of the Central Asian ruler Shah Rukh. He served as one of his father's military commanders and may have been favoured as his preferred successor. However, he died of illness in 1445, predeceasing Shah Rukh by two years.

== Life ==
Born on 27 April 1402, Muhammad Juki was the youngest of the three sons of Shah Rukh by his empress consort, Gawhar Shad. Somewhat younger than his full brothers Ulugh Beg and Baysunghur, Muhammad Juki also appears to have held a lower status.

He began his military career with his father's first campaign against the Qara Qoyunlu in Azerbaijan in 1420-21, during which he is recorded to have led troops. In later years, he played an important part in Shah Rukh's major military expeditions and seems to have been a common presence at court. He appears to have performed the role of a sort of troubleshooter, often being sent on special missions requiring status and finesse, such as dealing with difficult local rulers and frontier regions. At one point, he was instructed to lead an army into Transoxiana, the domain of his brother Ulugh Beg, when the latter was discovered to be planning an expedition which their father had not approved. In 1425-6, Barak Khan, ruler of the Golden Horde laid claim to and began raiding the region of Sighnaq. Though Shah Rukh forbade a retaliatory expedition, in 1427, both Muhammad Juki and Ulugh Beg embarked on one regardless. This resulted in their heavy defeat and disordered return to Samarqand.

While his brothers received appointments as provincial governors at a young age, he was only given his first posting in 1429-30, over the region of Khuttalan. Following the death of Baysunghur, Muhammad Juki appears to have become his father's favourite as well as his desired heir, though his mother was opposed to his candidacy, instead preferring Baysunghur's son Ala al-Dawla. Gawhar Shad kept Muhammad Juki excluded from positions of power, refusing him any influence in the divan, something which was bestowed on Ala al-Dawla as well as his other nephew Abdal-Latif. Additionally, she did not honour any of his children by raising them in the royal court, as she had done with the sons of his elder brothers.

When Shah Rukh fell dangerously ill in 1444, Muhammad Juki, by then also governor of Balkh, immediately moved to the capital Herat in order to gain an advantage in the expected succession struggle. However, Gawhar Shad had already obtained the backing of the head of the military forces, Jalal ud-din Firuzshah, for Ala al-Dawla's accession. These preparations proved to be pointless when Shah Rukh unexpectedly recovered from his illness. However Firuzshah, already being investigated for abuse of power by Muhammad Juki on the emperor's orders, had angered the former with his backing of Ala al-Dawla. Muhammad Juki presented his findings to Shah Rukh, who reprimanded the noble. Unable to bear the disgrace, Firuzshah died of illness soon after.

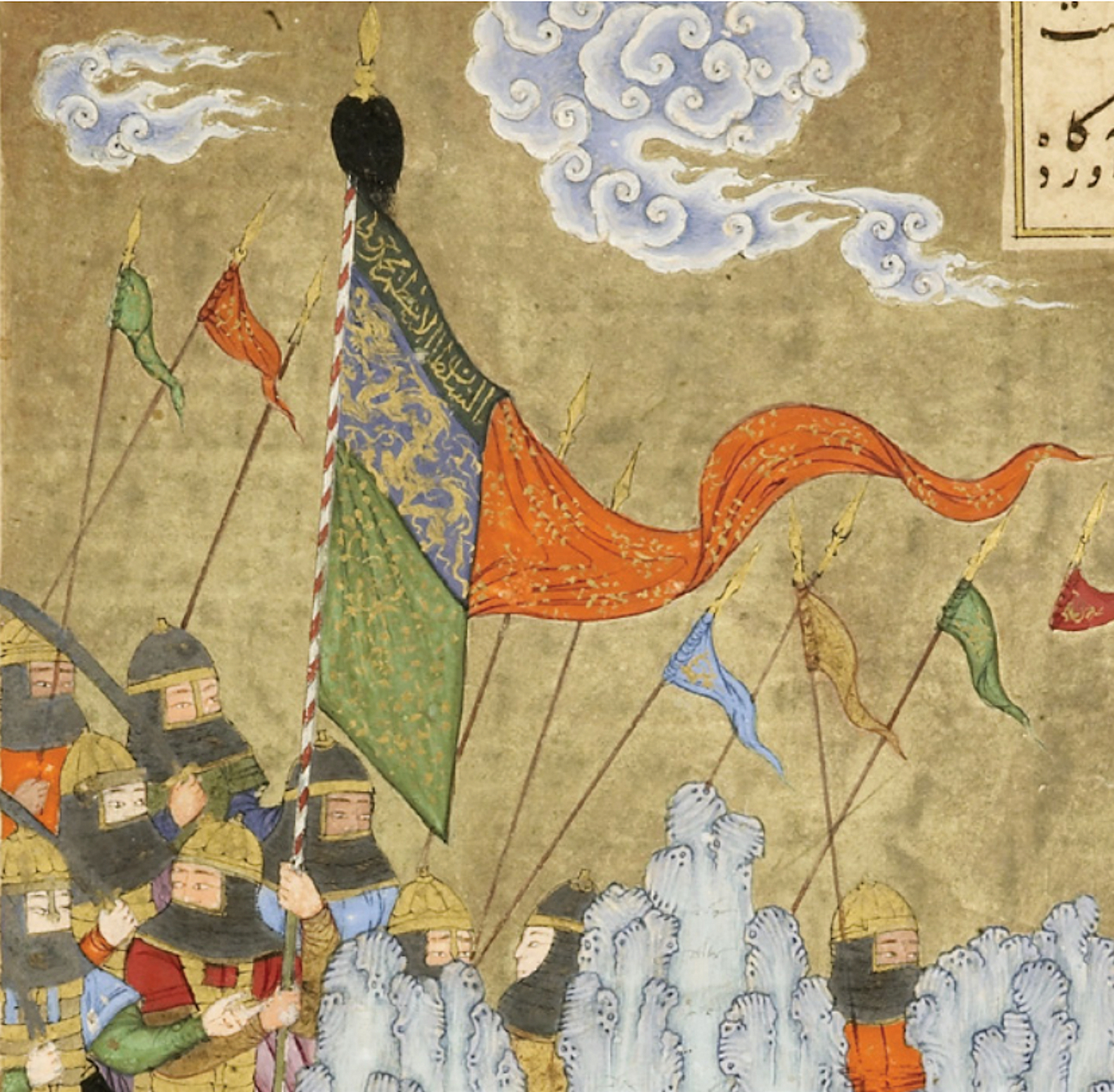
Flag in the name of Timurid prince Muhammad Juki, from a copy of the Shahnama of Firdawsi, probably Herat, c. 1440.

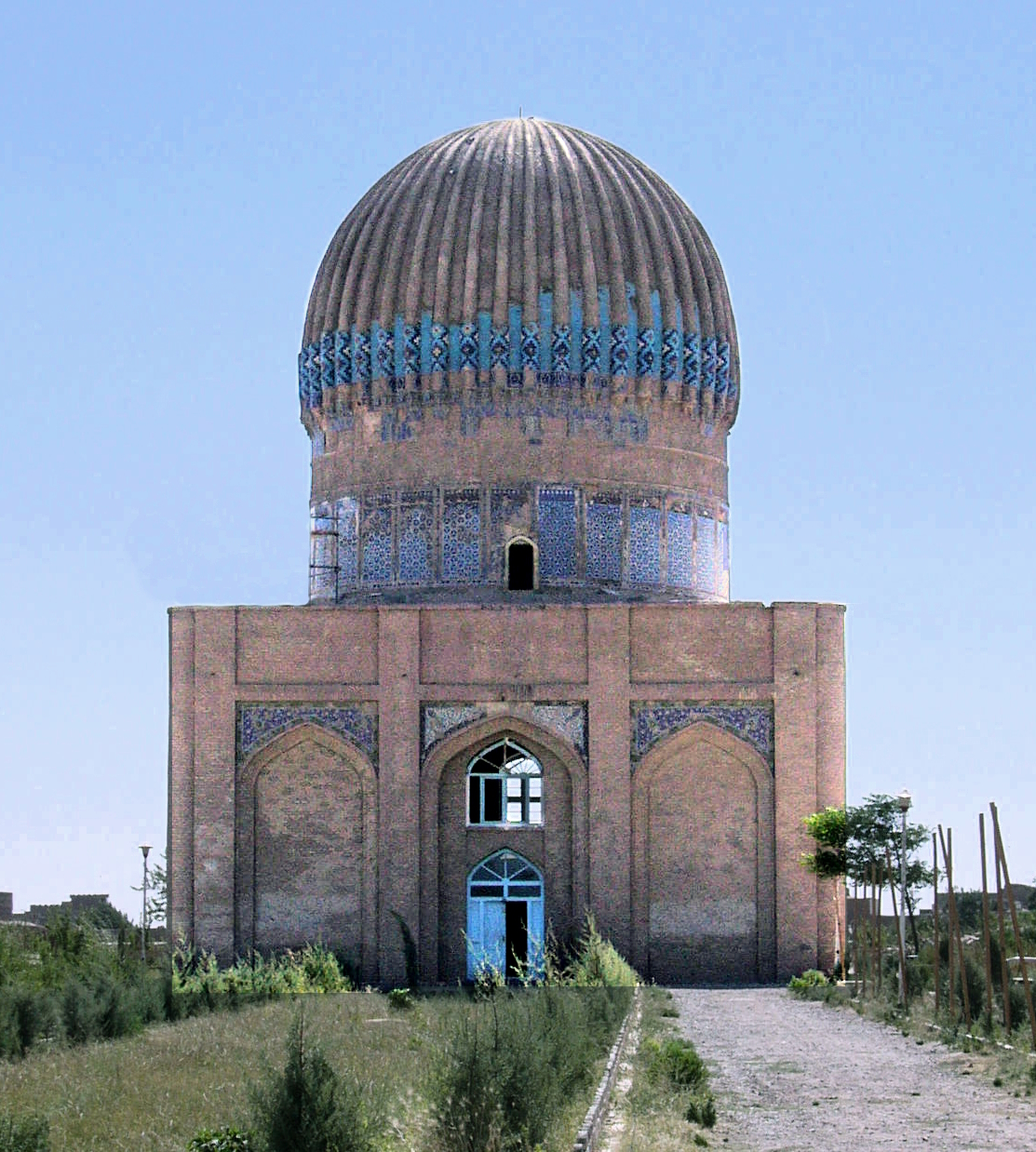
Muhammad Juki was buried in the Gawhar Shad Mausoleum in Herat

Muhammad Juki, suffering from a lingering illness which may have been exasperated by Gawhar Shad's hostility, died in Sarakhs in 1445, predeceasing his father. His governorships of Khuttalan and Balkh passed to his sons Abu Bakr and Muhammad Qasim respectively.

== Family ==
=== Wives and concubines ===
- Mihr Nigar Khanum: daughter of Shams-i-Jahan, Khan of the Chagatai Khanate
- Bakht Dawlat
- Bulghan Mughul
- Khanum: daughter of Edigu
- Taj al-Islam Khan: daughter of Qara Osman, ruler of the Aq Qoyunlu

=== Issue ===
By Mihr Nigar Khanum

- Suyurghatmish
- Tukal Khanum

By Bakht Dawlat

- Muhammad Qasim (b.1422)
- Abu Bakr (1427 – 1448?)
- Sa'adat Sultan

By Bulghan Mughul

- Ali (1423 – 1424)
- Qutlugh Sultan
- Zubayda Sultan
