= Gawhar Shad Mausoleum =

Former Islamic burial site in Herat, Afghanistan

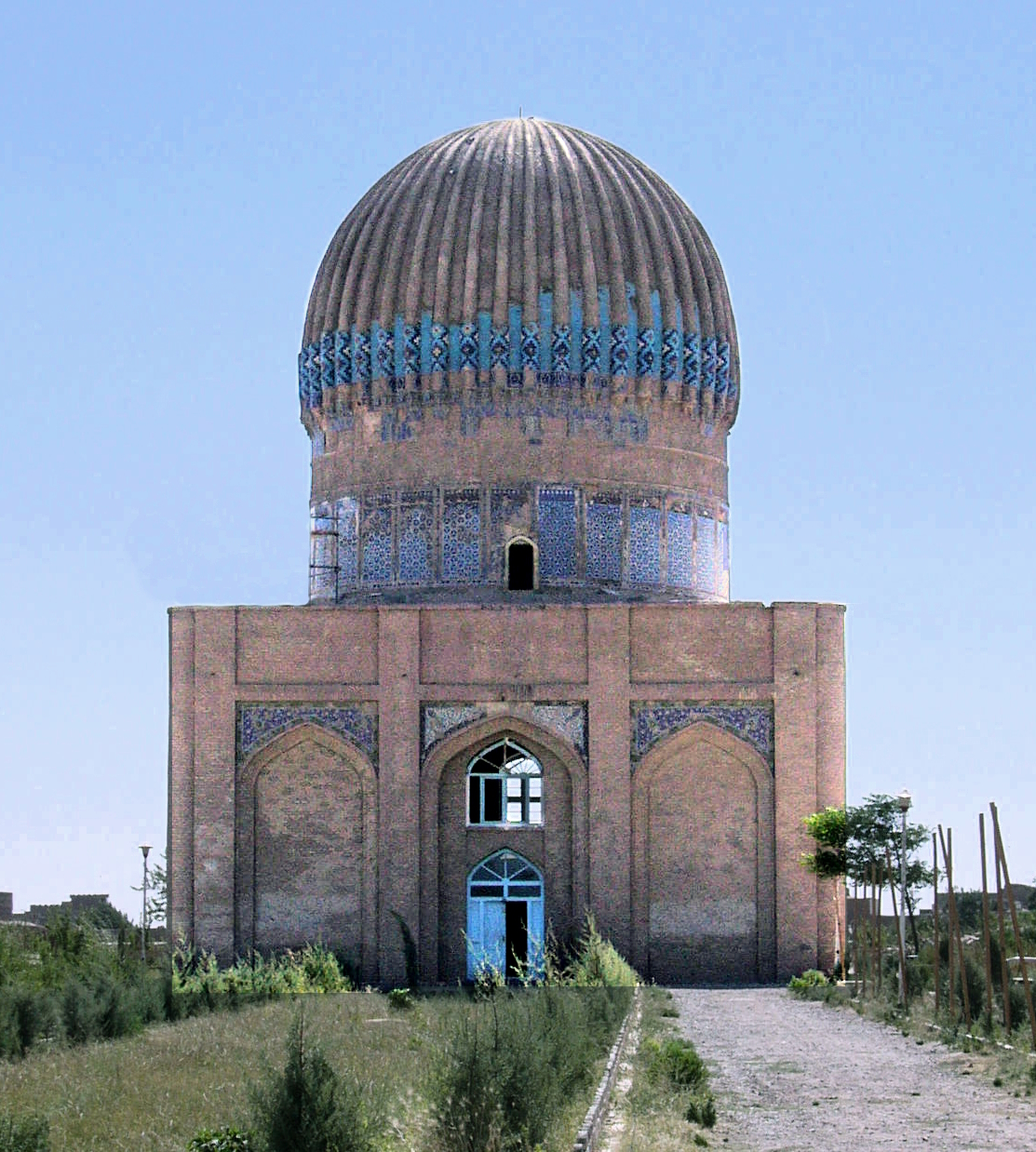
- The former mausoleum, in 2025

- Location of the mausoleum ruins in Afghanistan

Religion
- Affiliation: Islam (former)
- Ecclesiastical or organisational status: Mausoleum (former)
- Status: Closed (ruinous state)

Location
- Location: Musalla Complex, Herat
- Country: Afghanistan
- Interactive map of Gawhar Shad Mausoleum
- Coordinates: 34°21′27″N 62°11′7″E

Architecture
- Architect: Qavan ud-din
- Style: Timurid; Iranian
- Founder: Queen Gawhar Shad
- Completed: 1438 CE

Specifications
- Dome: One: (three inner)
- Minaret: Four: (one extant)
- Shrines: Several: Queen Gawhar Shad; Prince Baysunghur; other members of the family

The Gawhar Shad Mausoleum, also known as the Tomb of Baysunghur, is a former Islamic burial structure located in what is now Herat, Afghanistan. Built in the 15th century by Gawhar Shad, the chief wife of Timurid Emperor Shah Rukh, the structure served as a royal tomb for members of the Timurid dynasty and is part of the Musalla Complex. The structure has not operated as a mausoleum since the early part of the 20th century.

== History ==
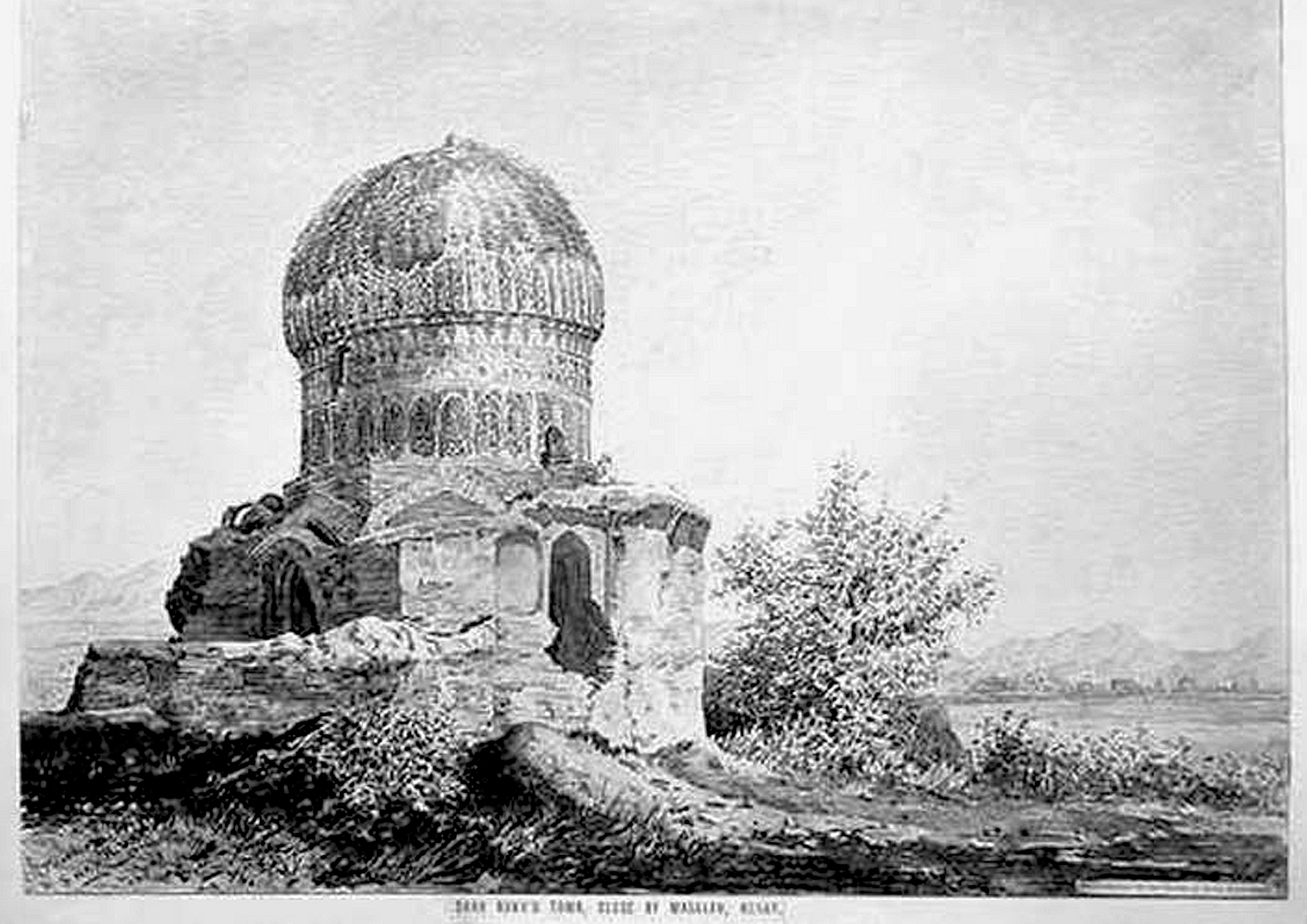
Gawhar Shad Mausoleum in 1885

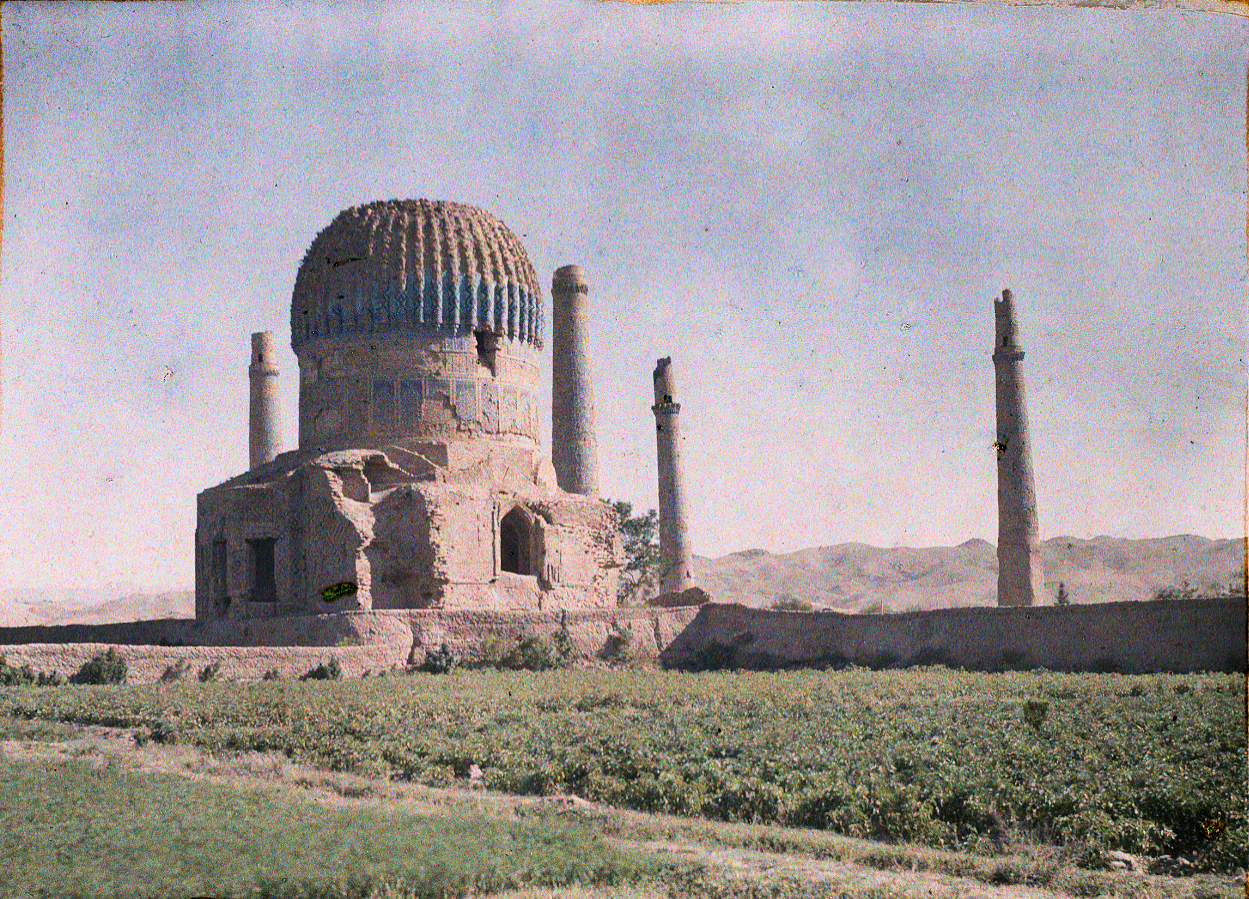
Gawhar Shad Mausoleum in 1928

The mausoleum was originally constructed to house the remains of Prince Baysunghur, a son of the Timurid ruler Shah Rukh by his chief wife Gawhar Shad. It was commissioned by the latter (for whom it is named) within the Gawhar Shad Madrasa which also bore her name and was completed in 1438. Its location in the Musalla Complex was convenient due to the close vicinity to the royal residence in the Bagh-i Zaghan. As such, over the following years, further members of Baysunghur's family were interred alongside him. These include Gawhar Shad herself and her brother Amir Sufi Tarkhan, her other son Muhammad Juki, Baysunghur's sons Sultan Muhammad and Ala al-Dawla, as well as the latter's son Ibrahim. More distantly related Timurids, Ahmad and Shah Rukh (sons of Abu Sa'id Mirza), were also buried in the mausoleum. Baysunghur's father Shah Rukh was briefly interred as well, before later being transferred to the Gur-e-Amir in Samarqand.

By the 20th century, the mausoleum had been extensively damaged, with the cupola in particular being severely deteriorated. Intervention in the 1950s resulted in drastically changing the appearance of the building, with an entirely new eastern façade being built and the hexagonal Mihrab being demolished and replaced with a rectangular one. This, along with later restorations, were of poor quality and used inappropriate materials. In 2014, UNESCO and the Afghanistan government coordinated to attempt to preserve and replicate the tile work on the exterior dome. In 2004, UNESCO added the City of Herat, including the entire Musalla Complex, to the Tentative List of UNESCO World Heritage Sites.

== Architecture ==
The mausoleum forms a cruciform shape, with a dome covering the centre. This dome is the most impressive feature of the structure, in that it is actually three domes superimposed over one another: a low inner dome, a bulbous outer cupola and a structural dome between them. The outer cupola is decorated with flowery light blue-green mosaics. The inner dome is adorned with gold leaf, lapis lazuli and other colours which form intricate patterns. The interior of the tomb itself is a square chamber with axial niches.

== Burials ==
Due to the widespread habit of tombstones being taken and re-used, it is unknown how many burials there are in the mausoleum. Though some sources claim there were as many as twenty grave markers at one time, at present there are only six. These are oblong shaped and made of matt black stone, with carved floral patterns.

== Gallery ==
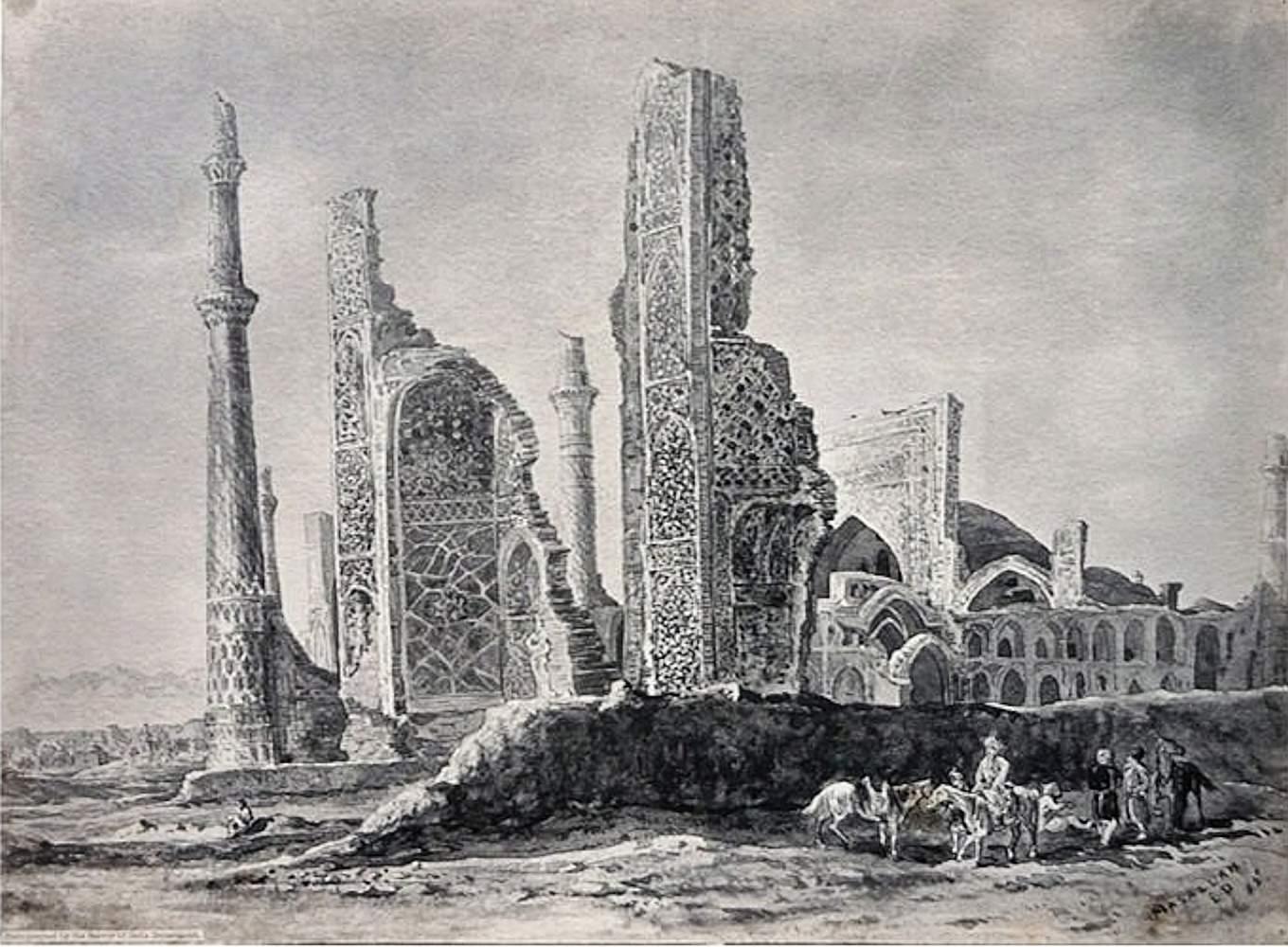
Gawhar Shad Madrasa (of which the mausoleum was a part). Eastern portal, with Gawhar Shad Mosque in the background

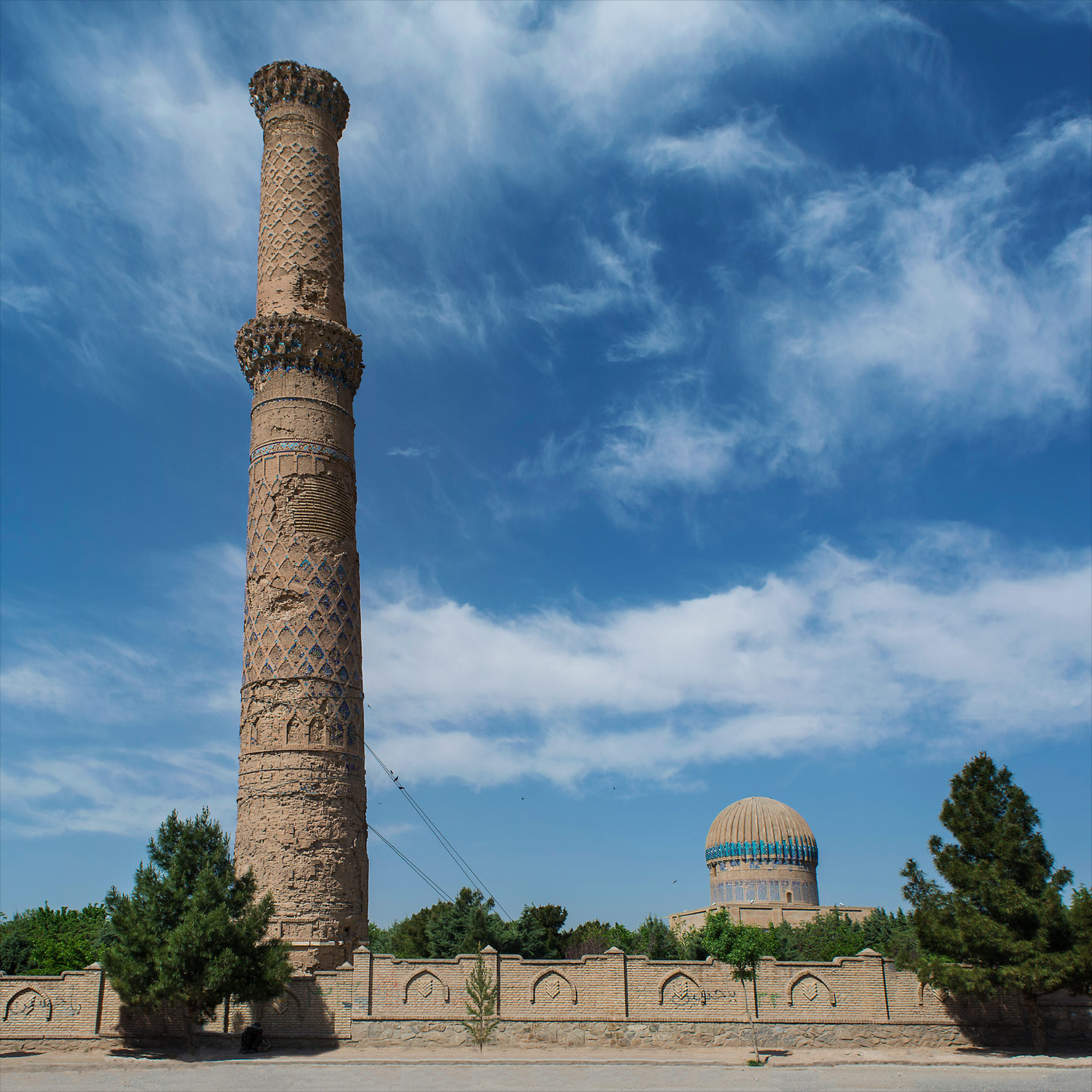
Remaining minaret of the madrasa and mausoleum

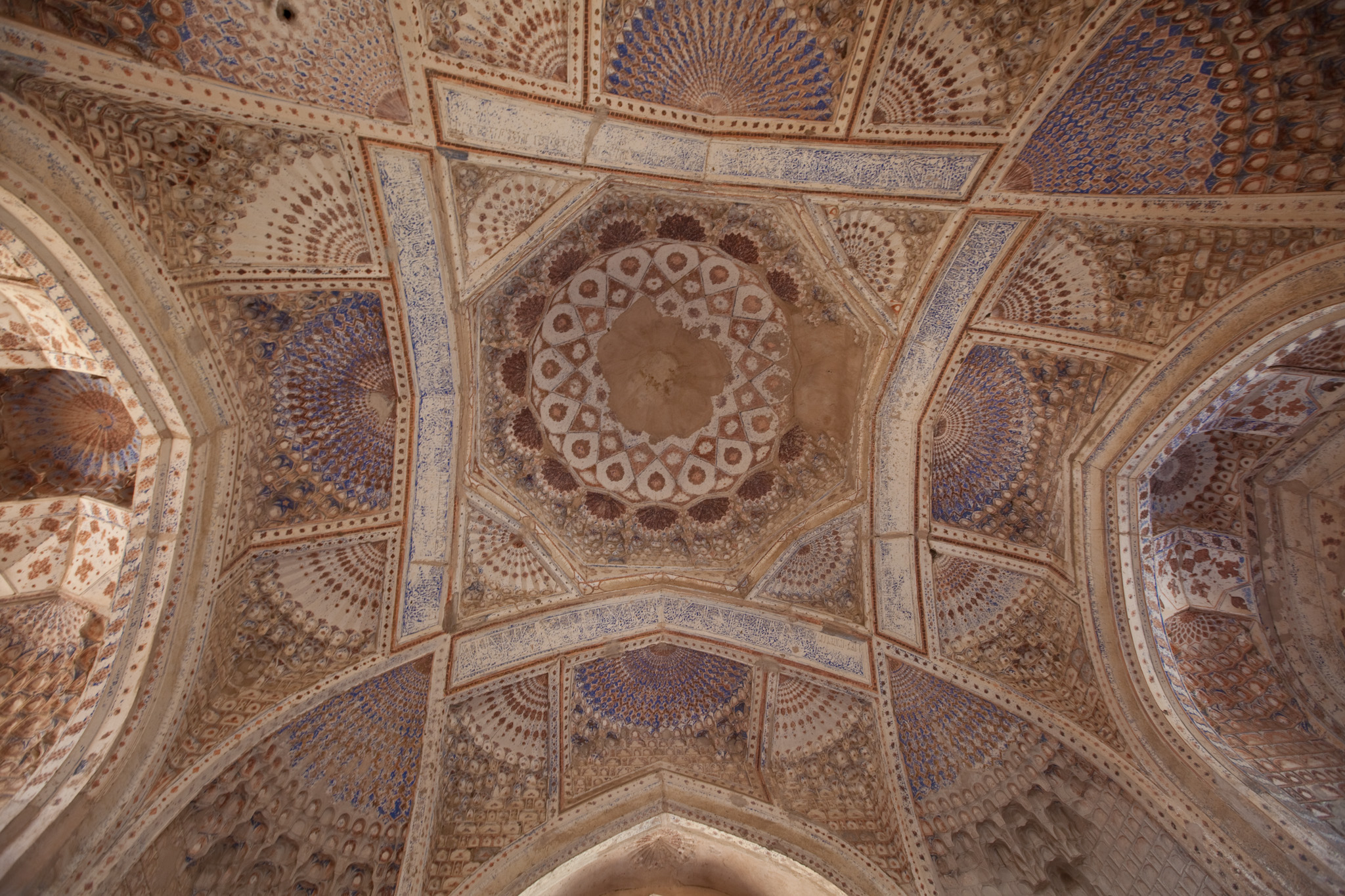
Vaulted ceiling inside the tomb

Tombstones of Gawhar Shad family

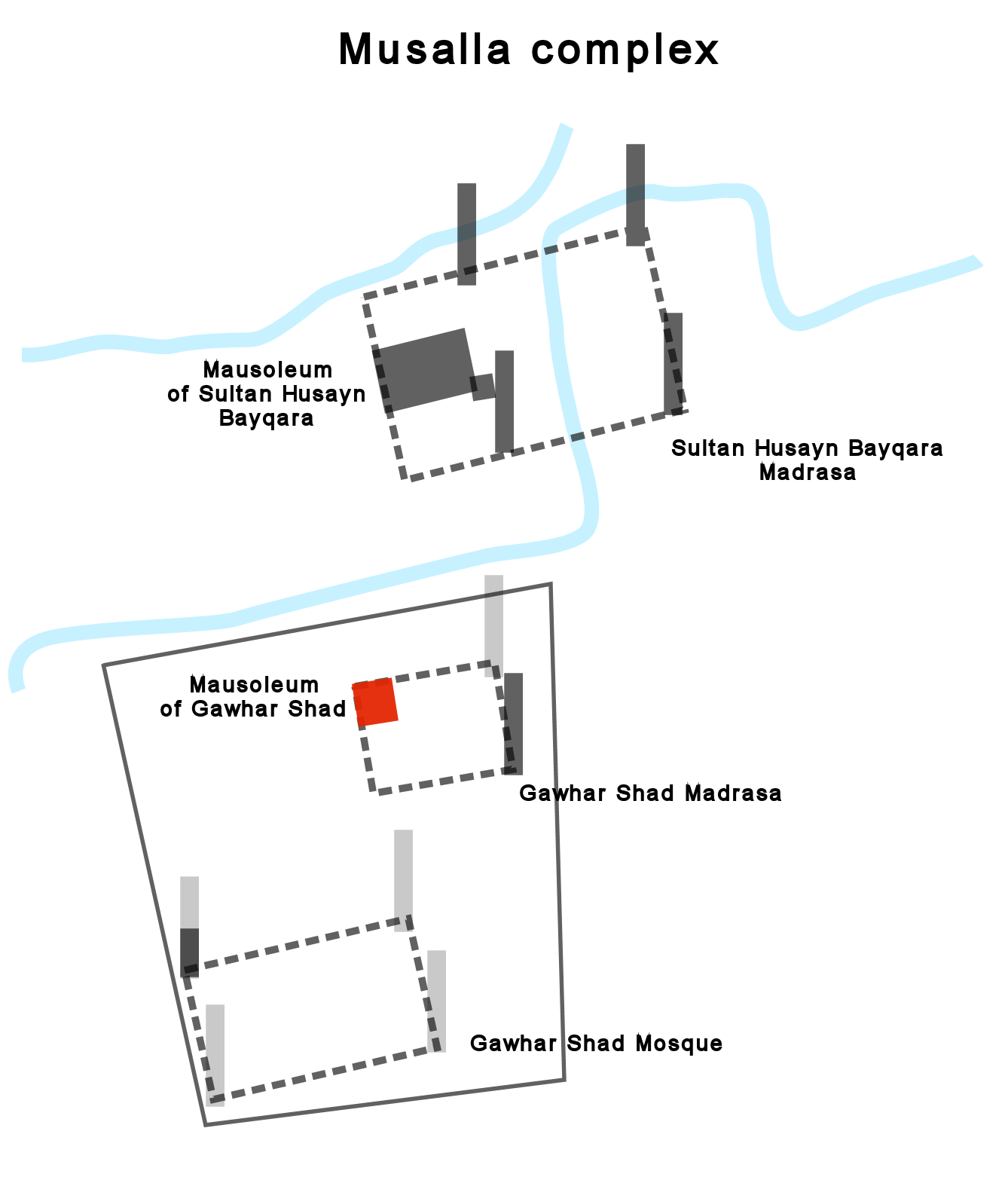
Location of the mausoleum (red) in the Musalla complex

== See also ==
- Musalla complex
- Islam in Afghanistan
