= Goharshad Mosque rebellion =

1935 rebellion in Pahlavi Iran

Goharshad Mosque massacre
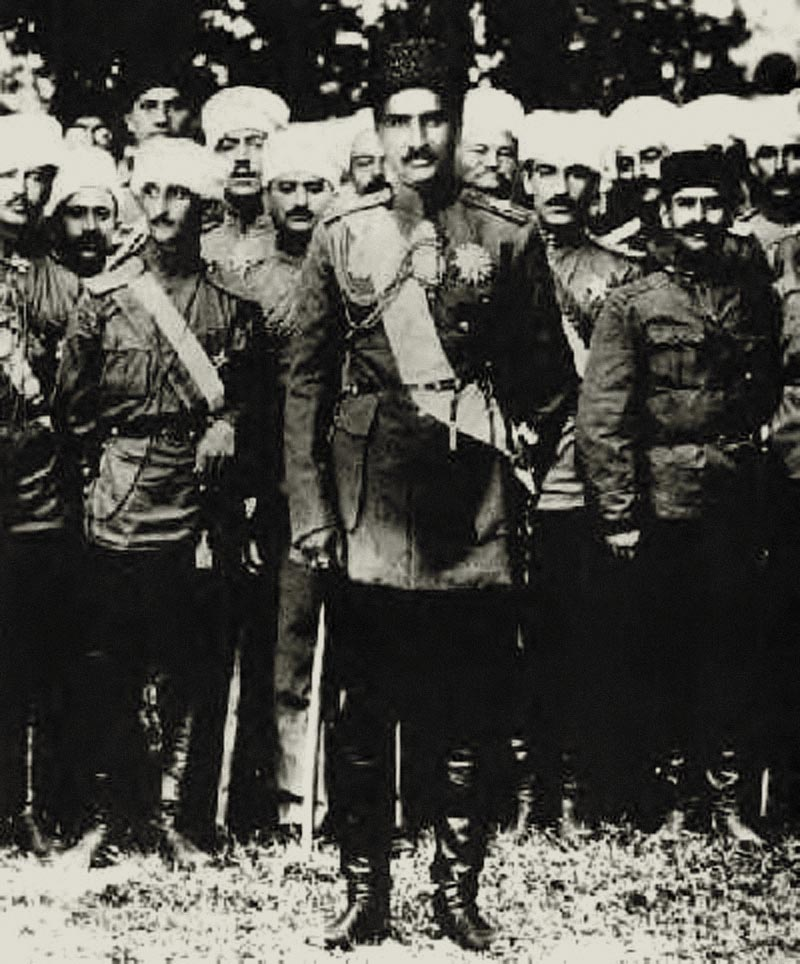
- Reza Shah and Persian Cosacks Officers in 1921
Date	12 July 1935
Location	Goharshad Mosque, Imam Reza Shrine, Mashhad, Iran
Result	Massacre of the besieged civilians

Belligerents
Pahlavi Iran; (Pahlavi Iran) Shahrbani police units; (Pahlavi Iran) Imperial Iranian Army	Unarmed civilians

Commanders and leaders
(Pahlavi Iran) Reza Shah (Pahlavi Iran) Azizollah Zarghami (Pahlavi Iran) Mohammad-Hosayn Ayrom (Pahlavi Iran) Fathollah Pakravan (Pahlavi Iran) Mohammad Vali Asadi	Mohammad-Taqi Bahlul

Strength
2,000	

Casualties and losses
2 officers, 18 soldiers killed; 2 soldiers executed for disobedience, 1 committed suicide.	(disputed) 2,000–5,000 (128 dead, 200–300 wounded, 800 arrested according to a British report")
- Total: 2000 killed

The Goharshad Mosque rebellion (Persian: واقعه مسجد گوهرشاد) took place in August 1935, when a backlash against the westernizing and secularist policies of Reza Shah of the Pahlavi dynasty erupted at Imam Reza Shrine in Mashhad, Iran.

== Background ==
The Shah's violent Westernization campaign against Shiite society saw a spike in hostilities with the regime in the summer of 1935 when Reza Shah banned traditional Islamic clothing and ordered all men to be forced to wear European-style bowler hats.

== Event ==
The event occurred in response to the Secularization activities by Reza Shah in 1935. Responding to a cleric, who denounced the Shah's "heretical" innovations, westernizing, corruption, and heavy consumer taxes, many merchants and locals took refuge in the shrine, chanted slogans such as "The Shah is a new Yazid," likening him to the Umayyad caliph.

For four full days, local police and the army refused to violate the shrine. The standoff was ended when reinforcements from Iranian Azerbaijan arrived and broke into the shrine, killing dozens and injuring hundreds, marking a final rupture between Shia clergy and the Shah.

== Toll ==
According to a report of the Research Institute of Baqir al-'Ulum, which may have deliberately exaggerated the numbers, the number of killed by Reza Shah's forces was between 2000 and 5000. According to a British report, which may have deliberately underplayed the numbers, the outcome of the event resulted in 2 Army officers and 18 soldiers killed; 2 soldiers executed on the spot for disobedience; 1 soldier committed suicide; there were 800–1200 dead among the villagers, 100–500 wounded and 800 arrested.

== See also ==
- Grand Mosque seizure
- Kashf-e hijab
- Abadan Crisis
- White Revolution
- Iranian Revolution
- List of modern conflicts in the Middle East
