= Gawhar Shad =

Chief consort of Shah Rukh, the emperor of the Timurid Empire

Gawhar Shad گوهرشاد
- Tenure: 1405–1447
- Born: 14th century Samarkand, Timurid Empire
- Died: 19 July 1457; Herat, Timurid Empire
- Burial: Gawhar Shad Mausoleum, Herat
- Spouse: Shah Rukh
- Issue: Ulugh Beg; Baysunghur; Muhammad Juki; Maryam Sultan; Sa'adat Sultan; Qutlugh Tarkhan Agha
Names
- گوهرشاد
- House: Timurid
- Father: Giāth ud-Din Tarkhān
- Mother: Khānzāde Khanum
- Religion: Islam

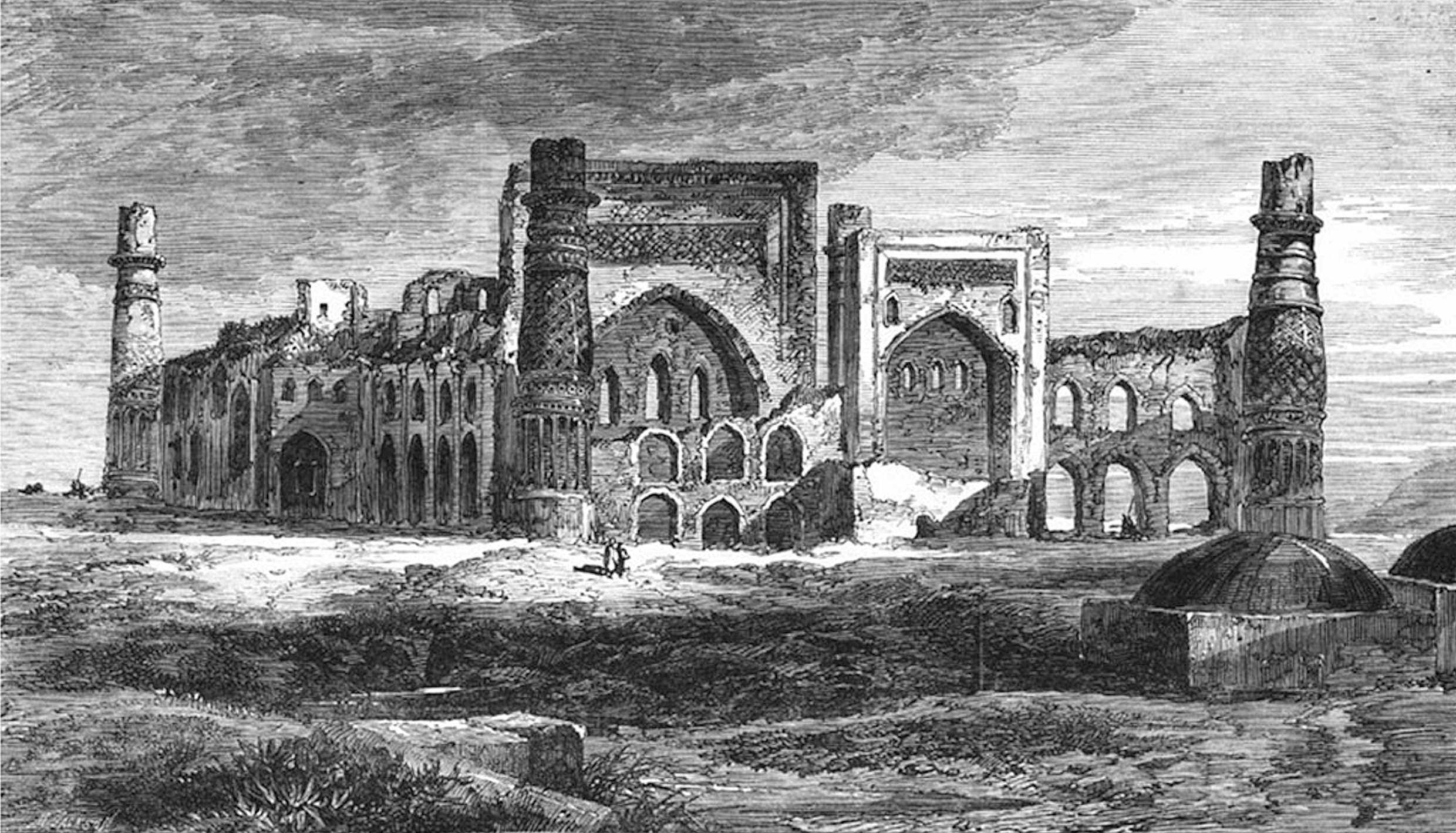
Gawhar Shad Mosque in Herat. Illustrated London News, 1863.

Gawhar Shad (Persian: گوهرشاد, romanized: Gawaršād; meaning "joyful jewel" or "shining jewel"; also Gawhar Shad Begum, Gohar Shād or Gawharshâd; died 19 July 1457) was the chief consort of Shah Rukh, the emperor of the Timurid Empire.

== Life ==
She was the daughter of Giāth ud-Din Tarkhān, an important and influential noble during Tīmur's reign. Her ancestor, Qishliq of the Suldus tribe, had been granted the title Tarkhān personally by Genghis Khan for his services, and was later a commander of a thousand under Chagatai Khan. The Tarkhān title descended down the family and they enjoyed significant prestige.

=== Marriage ===
Gawhar Shad was married to Shah Rukh probably in 1388, certainly before 1394 when their son, Ulugh Beg was born. It was a successful marriage, according to the ballads of Herat which sing of Shah Rukh's love for her. But little is known of their first forty years together, except what concerns her buildings.

Along with her brothers who were administrators at the Timurid court in Herat, Gawhar Shad played a very important role in the early Timurid history. In 1405 she moved the Timurid capital from Samarkand to Herat.

She was instrumental in the construction of Herat's Mousallah Complex.

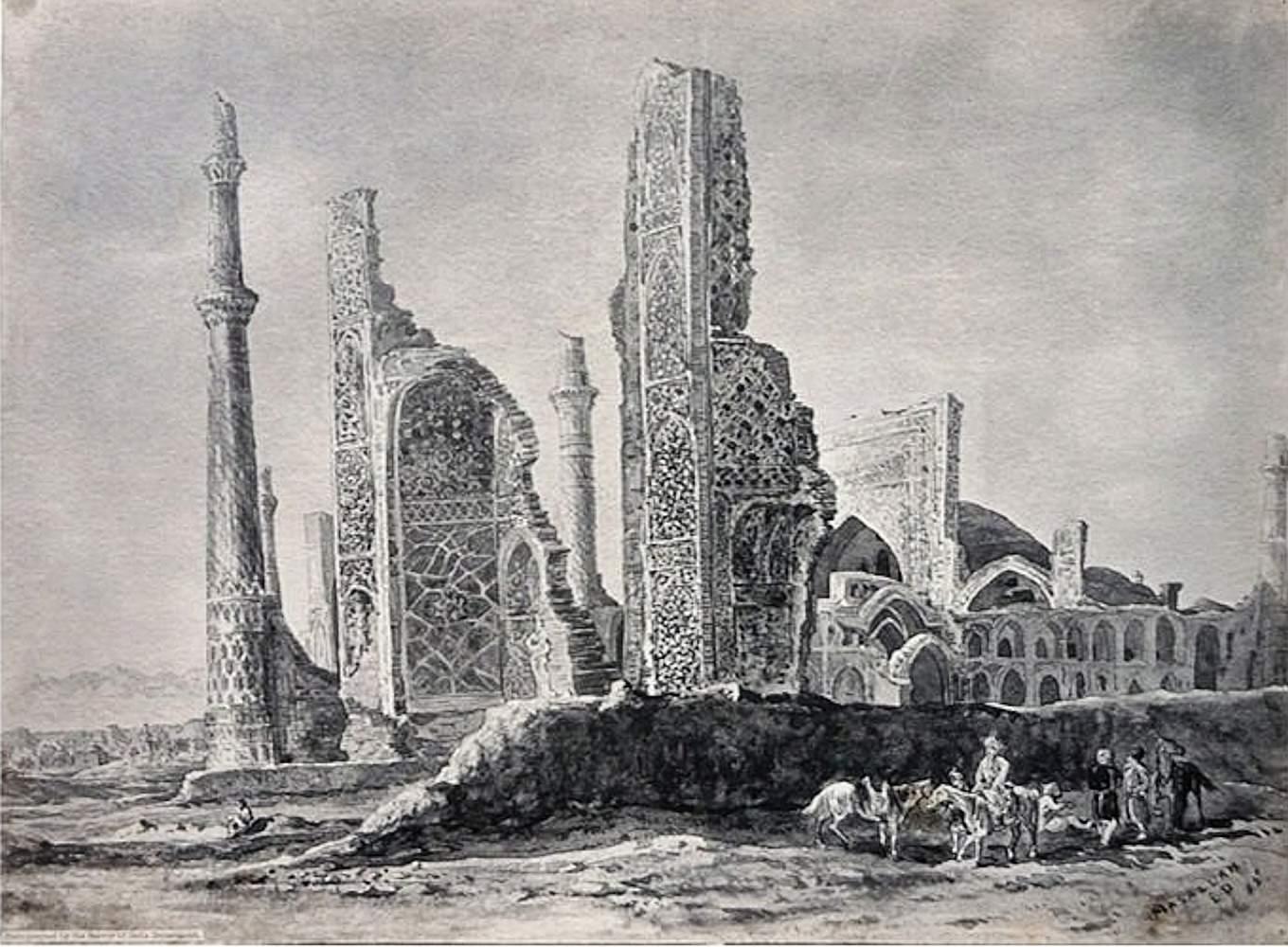
Gawhar Shad Madrasa eastern portal (Herat), from the northeast, with Gawhar Shad Mosque in the background. Durand 1885 (Illustrated London News 87, 1885).

Under her patronage, the Persian language and Persian culture were elevated to a main element of the Timurid dynasty. She and her husband led a cultural renaissance by their lavish patronage of the arts, attracting to their court artists, architects and philosophers and poets acknowledged today among the world's most illustrious, including the poet Jami. Many exquisite examples of Timurid architecture remain in Herat today.

=== Later years ===
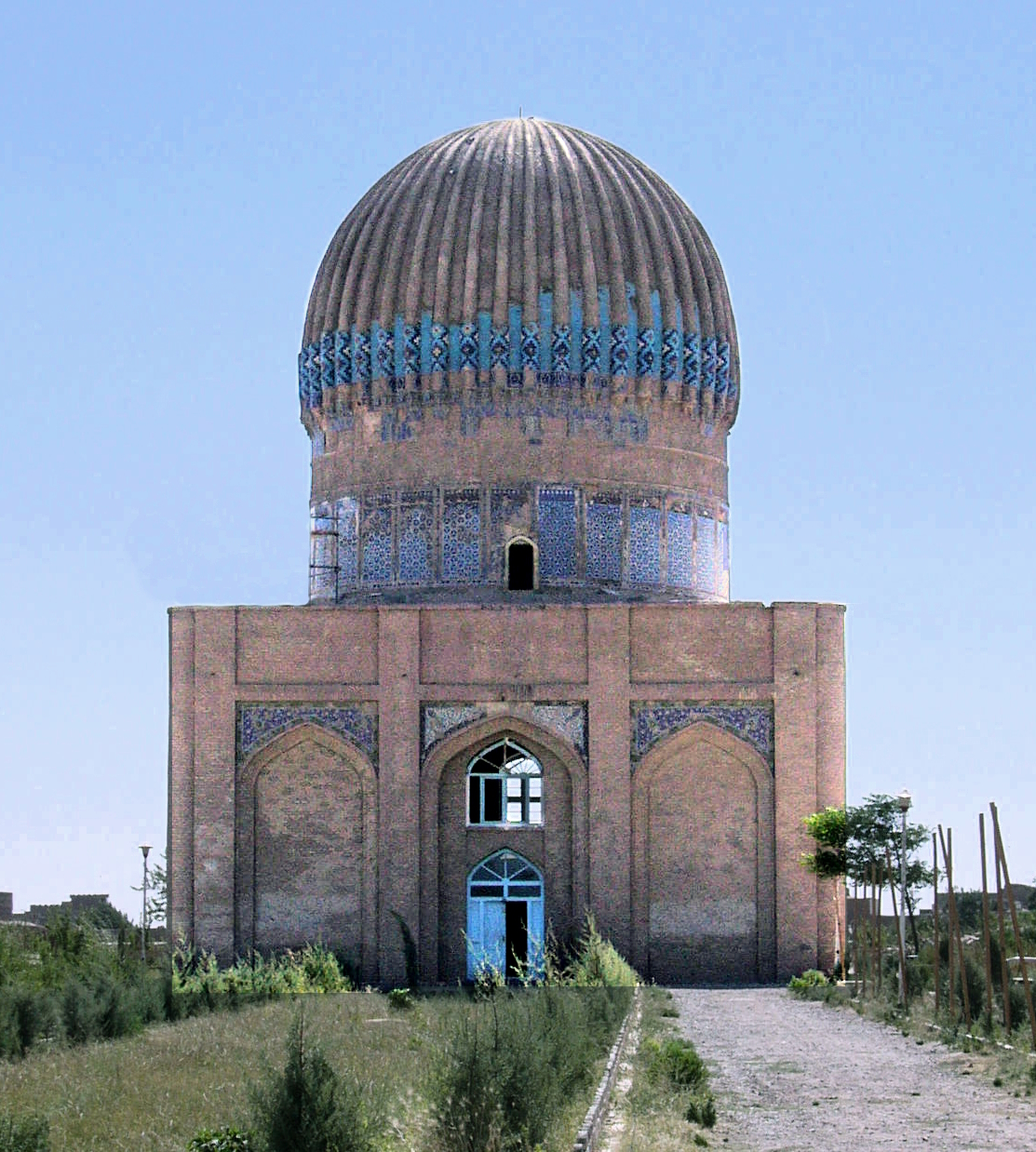
The Gawhar Shad Mausoleum in Herat

After the death of her husband in 1447 Gawhar Shad maneuvered her favorite grandson to the throne. For ten years she became the de facto ruler of an empire stretching from the Tigris to the borders of China. When she was well past 80, she was executed on 19 July 1457 on the order of Sultān Abū Sa'īd.

According to legend, Gawhar Shad once inspected a mosque and a religious school (madrasah) in Herat accompanied by two hundred female attendants, after it had been cleared of its students, all of whom were male. One youth remained, having fallen asleep in his cell, and was discovered by an attendant and seduced. When Gawhar Shad found out, she ordered that all two hundred of her attendants be married to the students.

=== Burial ===
Gawhar Shad's tomb, the Gawhar Shad Mausoleum, is located within to the Gawhar Shad Madrasa that she had built, of which one minaret and the mausoleum remain until this day.

== Legacy ==
A women's university in Kabul that opened in 2003 bears the name of Gawhar Shad

Gawhar Shad had a mosque ("Masjid-e Goharshād") built in 1418 in Mashhad, Khorasan, and another one, Gawhar Shad Mosque built in Herat. Her sister, Gowhar-Tāj also has a tomb in Khorasan.

== Personal life ==
=== Consort ===
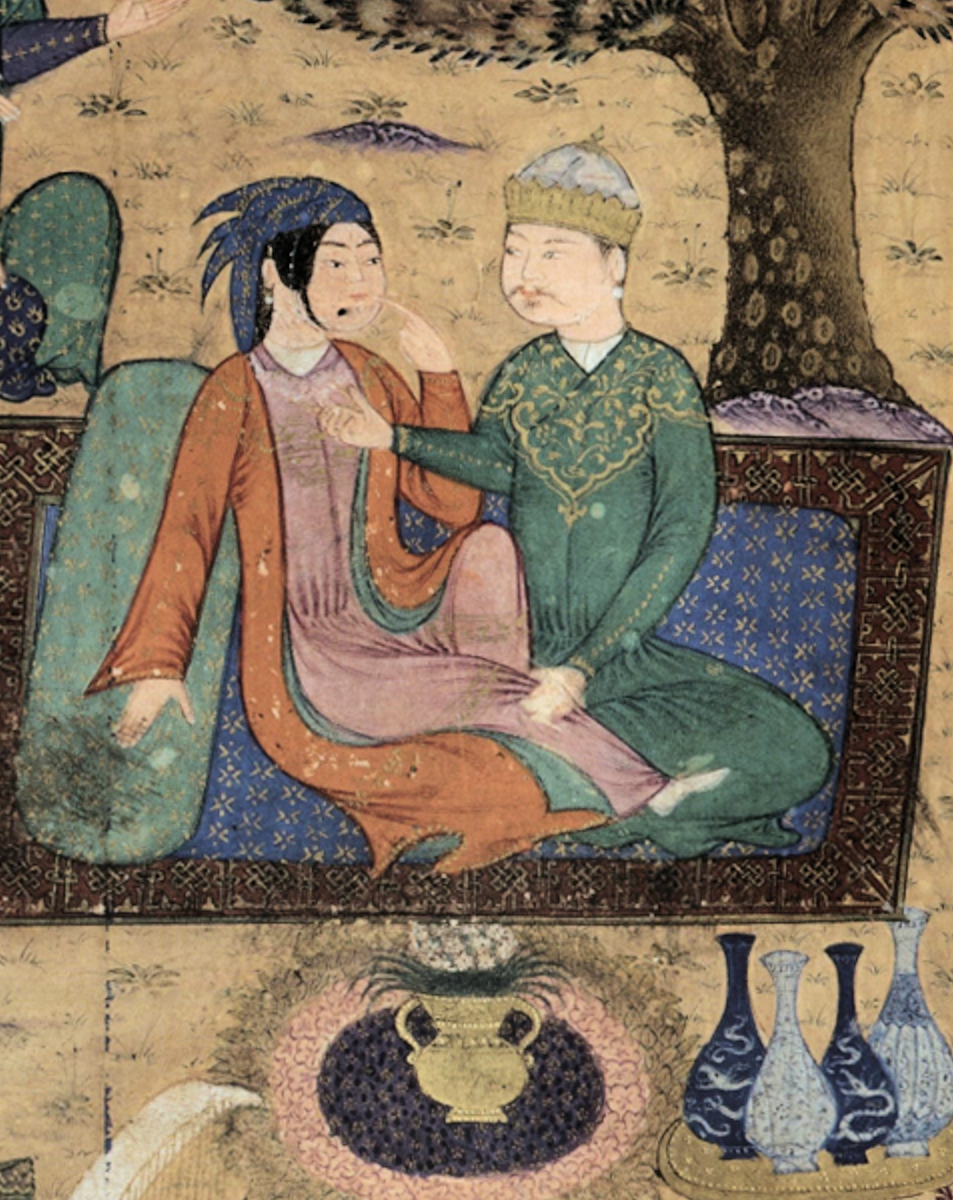
Contemporary portrait of Baysunghur, the second son of Shah Rukh and Gawhar Shad, with a court lady. 1426 painting

- Shah Rukh, Timurid Emperor

=== Sons ===
- Ulugh Beg (1394–1449). Viceroy of Transoxiana, later succeeded his father.
- Baysunghur (1397–1433). Shah Rukh's artistic third son never had a vice-royal position, but played an important part in his father's government in Samarqand.
- Muhammad Juki Mirza (1402–1444). Viceroy of Garmsir and Khuttal.

=== Daughters ===
- Maryam Sultan Agha (d. 1441). Married to Muhammad Jahangir Mirza, son of Muhammad Sultan Mirza, son of Jahangir Mirza
- Qutlugh Turkan Agha
- Sa'adat Sultan Agha
