= Baysunghur =

Timurid prince (1397–1433)

Baysunghur Bâhodor Mirza
- Timurid Prince
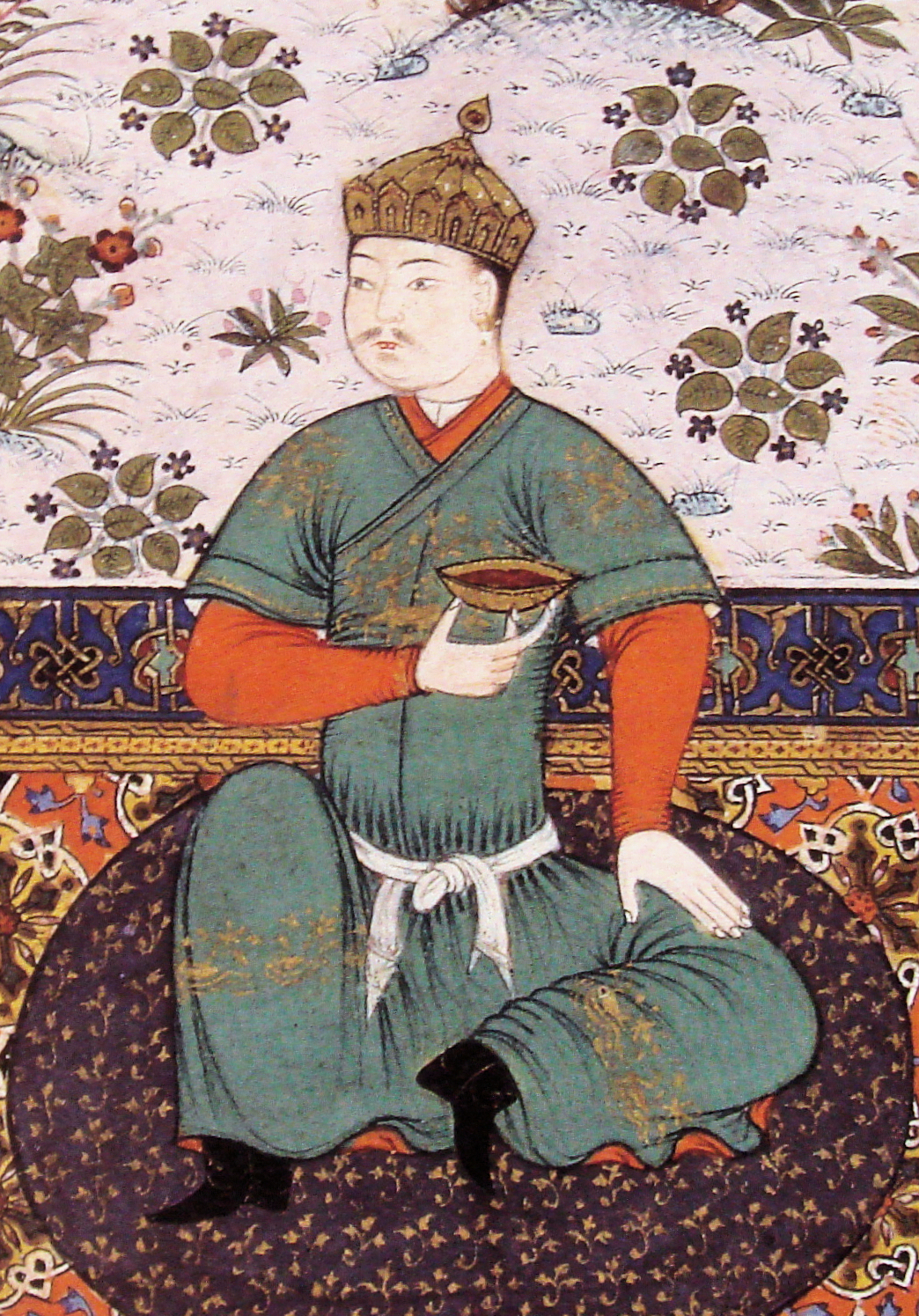
- Contemporary portrait of Baysunghur in 1429 in Herat. Frontispiece of Kalila wa Dimna, Topkapi R.1022 (detail).
- Born: 15 September 1397; Herat
- Died: 20 December 1433 (aged 36); Bagh-e Safid palace, Herat
- Burial: Gawhar Shad Mausoleum, Herat
- Spouse: katayun khatun
- Issue: Ala al-Dawla Mirza; Sultan Muhammad; Abul-Qasim Babur; Several others
- Ghiyath-ud-din Baysunghur Bâhador Khan
- House: House of Timur
- Father: Shah Rukh
- Mother: Gawhar Shad
- Religion: Islam

Ghiyath ud-din Baysunghur ( غیاث‌الدین بایسنقر) commonly known as Baysonqor or Baysongor, Baysonghor or (incorrectly) as Baysunqar, also called Sultan Bāysonḡor Bahādor Khan (1397–1433) was a prince of the Timurid dynasty and a grandson of Timur. He was known as a patron of arts and architecture, the leading patron of the Persian miniature in Iran, commissioning the Baysunghur Shahnameh and other works, as well as being a prominent calligrapher.

== Life ==
Baysunghur was a son of Shah Rukh, the ruler of Iran and Transoxiana, and Shah Rukh's most prominent wife, Gawhar Shad.

In the view of modern historians, Baysunghur was actually a better statesman than his more famous elder brother, Ulugh Beg, who inherited Shah Rukh's throne, but who "must have envied his younger brother, Baisunghur, whom his father never saddled with major responsibilities, which left him free to build his elegant madrasas in Herat, gather his ancient books, assemble his artists, and drink". He was well-versed in Persian, Arabic, as well his native Chagatai. He was a patron of Persian historians, including Hafiz-i Abru (died 1430), who dedicated his book Zubdat al-tawārīkh-i bāysunghurī to him.

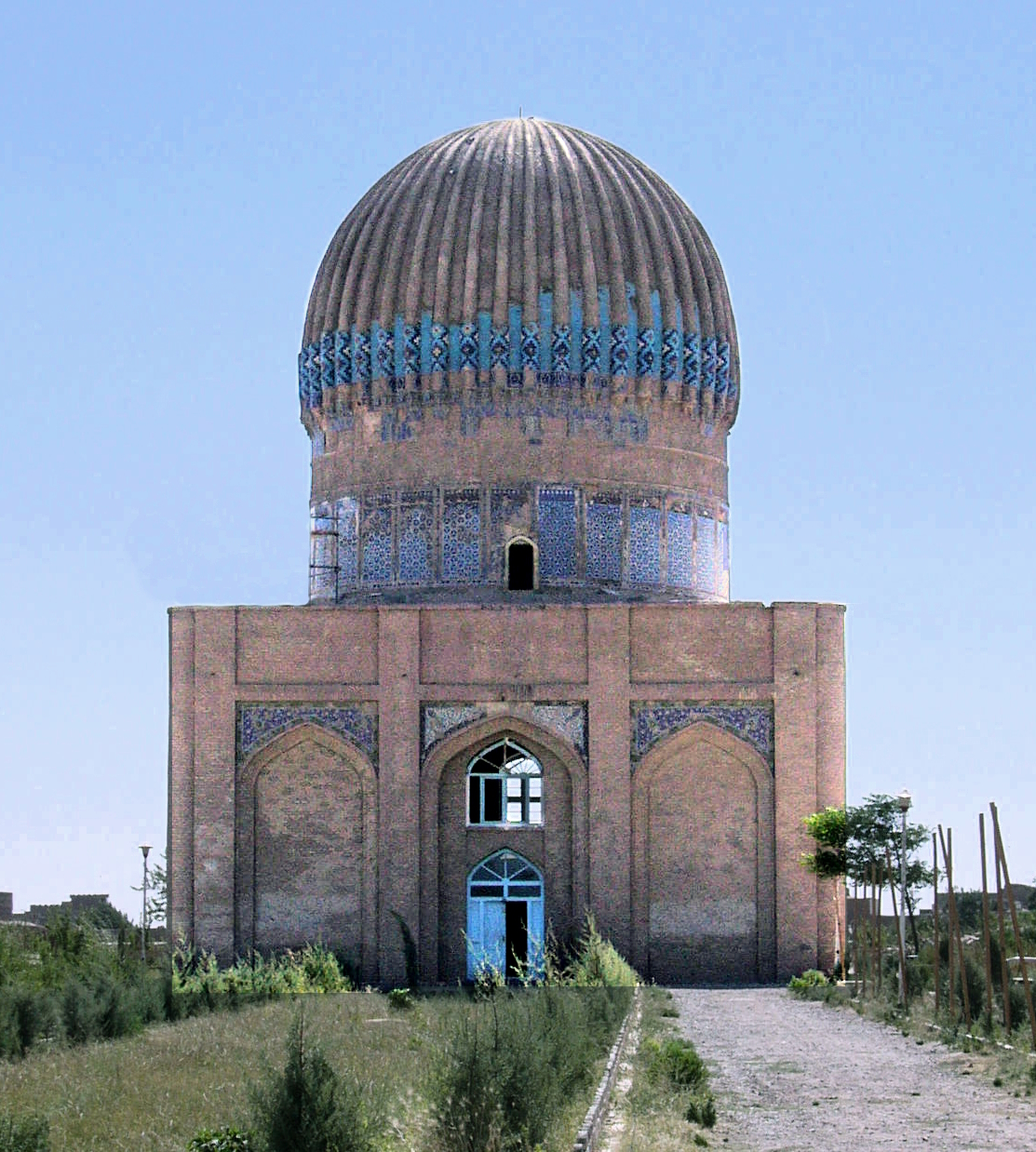
Baysunghur was buried in the Gawhar Shad Mausoleum in Herat

Baysunghur was living in Herat as governor by 1417. He temporarily took Tabriz from the Qara Qoyunlu in 1421, together with his father Shah Rukh.

=== Artistic endeavour ===
After temporarilly taking Tabriz from the Qara Qoyunlu in 1421, together with his father Shah Rukh, he brought back to Herat a group of Tabrizi artists and calligraphers, formerly working for Ahmad Jalayir, who he installed in Herat to add to his existing artists from Shiraz. They became the most important school of artists in Iran, merging the two styles. In the 16th century, Dust Muhammad Haravi described the Timurid Baysunghur's efforts at emulating Jalayirid art, after his occupation of Tabriz in 1421 and capture of artists from Tabriz:

His Highness Baysunghur Mirza had Master Sidi Ahmad the painter, Khwaja Ali the portraitist and Master Qiwamuddin the bookbinder brought from Tabriz and ordered that after the pleasing manner of Sultan Ahmad of Baghdad's miscellany, they should produce a book in exactly the same format and layout and with the same scenes depicted. The copying of it was given into the charge of Mawlana Fariduddin Ja'far. The binding was commissioned of the aforementioned Master Qiwamuddin, by whom inlay in bindings was invented; and Mir Khalil was put in charge of decoration and depiction of scenes.

— Preface to the Bahram Mirza Album (extract), by Dust Muhammad.

== Gallery ==
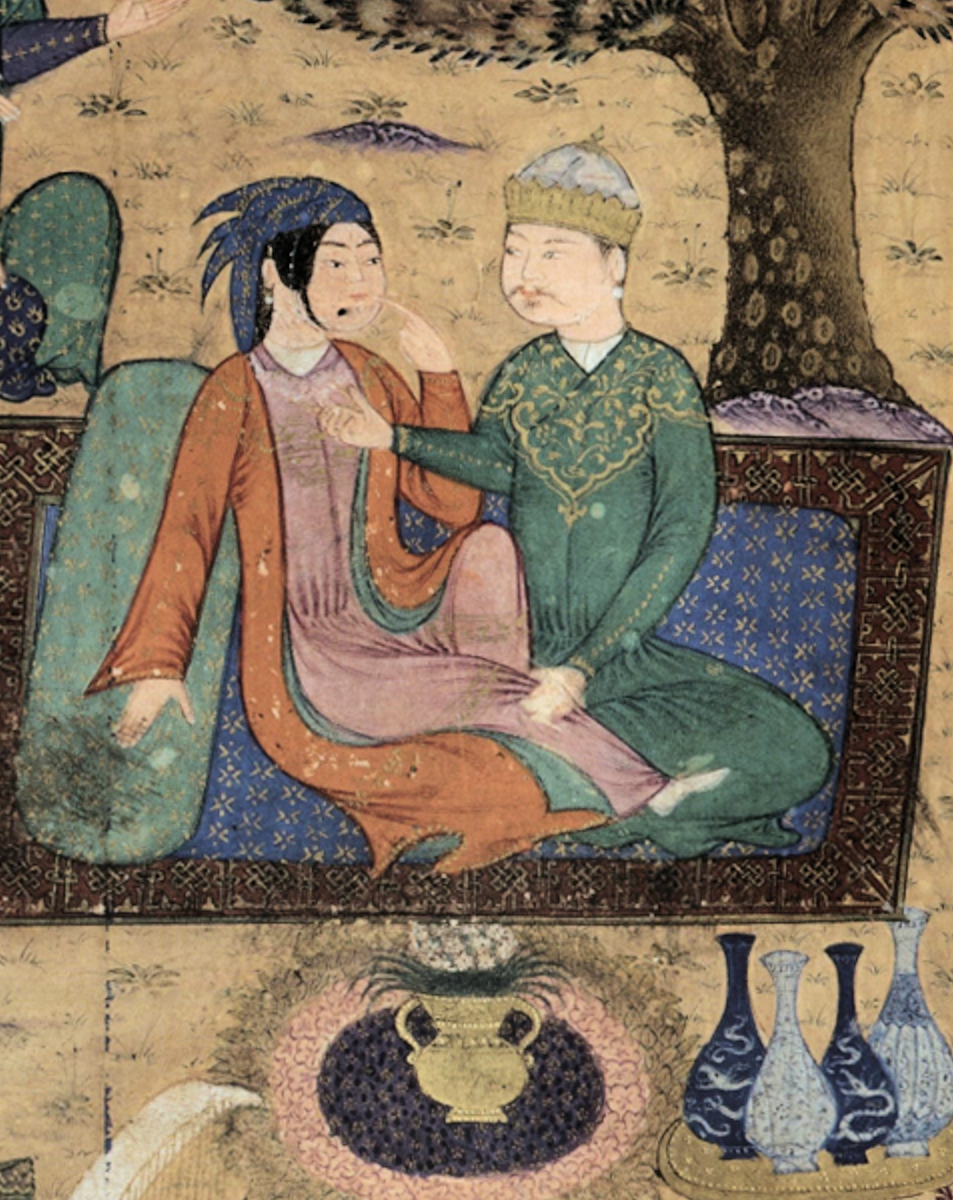
Baysungur dallying with his Ladies, 1426 painting

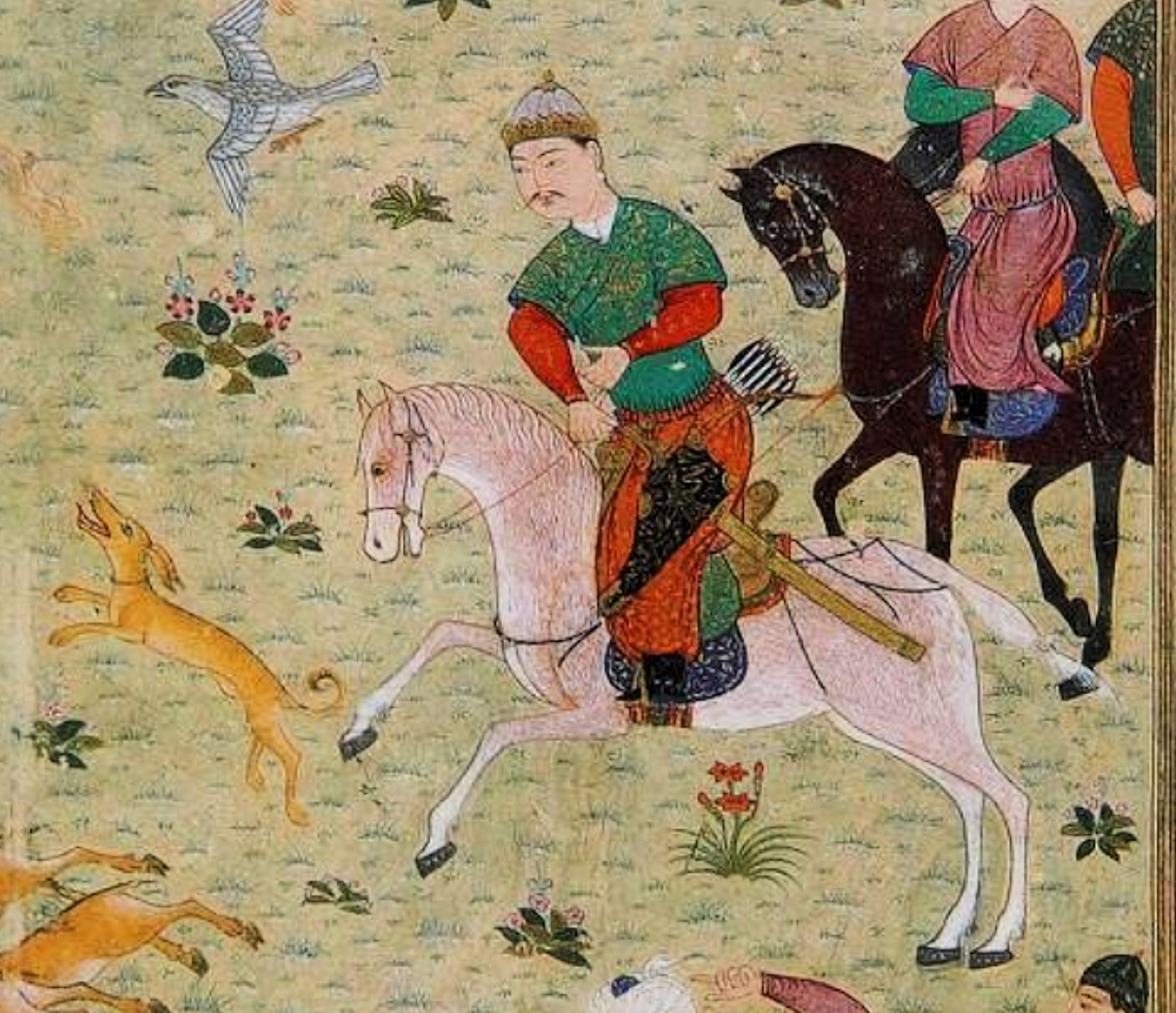
Baysunghur watching a hunt. Herat, 1427

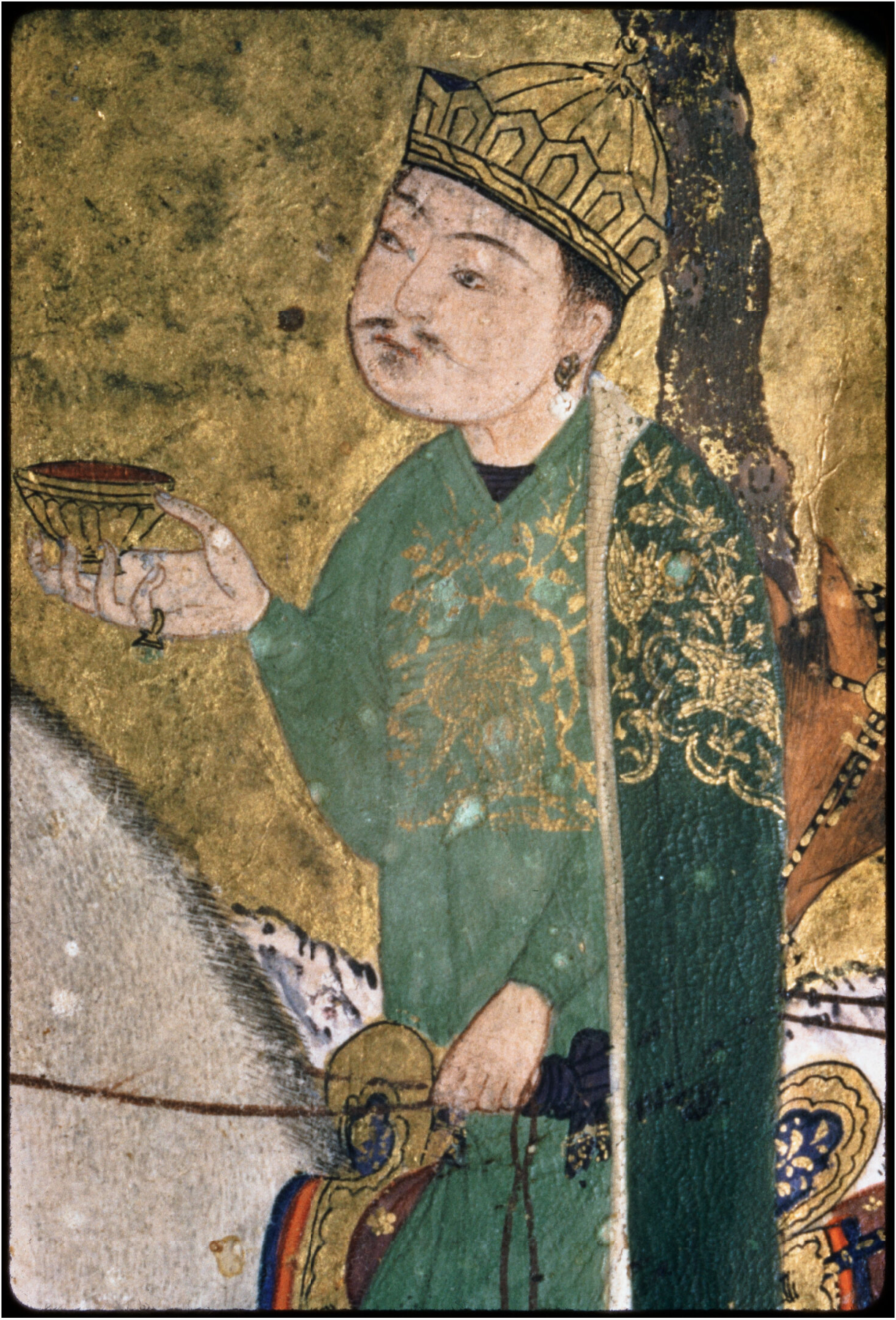
Baysunghur attending a hunt. 1430 painting

== Personal life ==
Consorts

Baysunghur had five wives:

- Jan Malik Agha, daughter of Amir Chulpan Qauchin;
- Gawhar Nasab Agha, a lady from Khwarezm;
- Khandan Agha;
- Afaq Agha;
- Shah Begi Agha;

Sons

Baysunghur had three sons:

- Ala al-Dawla Mirza - with Jan Malik Agha;
- Abul-Qasim Babur Mirza - with Gawhar Nasab Agha;
- Sultan Muhammad Mirza - with Khandan Agha;

Daughters

Baysunghur had eight daughters:

- Ruqaiya Begi Begum - with Shah Begi Agha;
- Fatima Sultan Begum - with Gawhar Nasab Agha;
- Zuhra Begi Begum - with Gawhar Nasab Agha;
- Aisha Begi Begum - with Afaq Agha, married to Sultan Masud Mirza, son of Sayorghatmish Mirza, son of Shah Rukh;
- Sa'adat Begi Begum - with Khandan Agha;
- Bakht Daulat Begum;
- Payanda Sultan Begum;
- Sahib Sultan Begum, married to Muhammad Khalil Mirza son of Muhammad Jahangir Mirza, son of Muhammad Sultan Mirza, son of Jahangir Mirza;

== Sources ==
- Manz, Beatrice Forbes (2011). "Bāysunghur, Ghiyāth al-Dīn". In Fleet, Kate; Krämer, Gudrun; Matringe, Denis; Nawas, John; Rowson, Everett (eds.). Encyclopaedia of Islam (3rd ed.). Brill Online. ISSN 1873-9830.
- Roemer, H. R. (1989). "Bāysonḡor, Ḡīāṯ-al-Dīn". In Yarshater, Ehsan (ed.). Encyclopædia Iranica. Vol. IV/1: Bāyju–Behruz. London and New York: Routledge & Kegan Paul. pp. 6–9. ISBN 978-0-71009-124-6.
