= Khvaja Qivam al-Din Nizam al-Mulk Khvafi =

Khvaja Qivam al-Din Nizam al-Mulk Khvafi was a Persian bureaucrat who served the Timurid Empire in the late 15th-century.

His father was a provincial judge from Khwaf in the Khorasan region of eastern Iran. According to the contemporary historian Isfizari, Qivam was a descendant of Fasih Khwafi's great-grandfather Khvaja Majd, who ruled in Khvaf in the early 14th-century. In 1471/2, the Timurid ruler of Khorasan, Sultan Husayn Bayqara (r. 1469–1506), appointed Qivam al-Din as his vizier. Together with another vizier Khvaja Afzal al-Din Muhammad Kirmani (appointed in 1473/4), Qivam al-Din plotted to have the powerful bureaucrat Majd al-Din Muhammad Khvafi dismissed through a charge of embezzlement. Pressurized by these two highly competent bureaucrats, Sultan Husayn first had Majd al-Din jailed (as was the tradition), and then started an investigation into the charge. An error on the part of the accusers, resulted in the release of Majd al-Din and drop of the charge. In June 1498, Qivam al-Din was executed through a plot led by his former allies, Afzal al-Din and Ali-Shir Nava'i.

== Sources ==
- Manz, Beatrice Forbes (2007). Power, Politics and Religion in Timurid Iran. Cambridge University Press. ISBN 978-1-139-46284-6.
- Subtelny, Maria (1988). "Centralizing Reform and Its Opponents in the Late Timurid Period". Iranian Studies. 21 (1/2): 129–151. doi:10.1080/00210868808701712. JSTOR 4310597. (registration required)
- Subtelny, Maria (2007). Timurids in Transition: Turko-Persian Politics and Acculturation in Medieval Iran. Brill. ISBN 978-90-04-16031-6.
