= Majd al-Din Muhammad Khvafi =

Persian bureaucrat

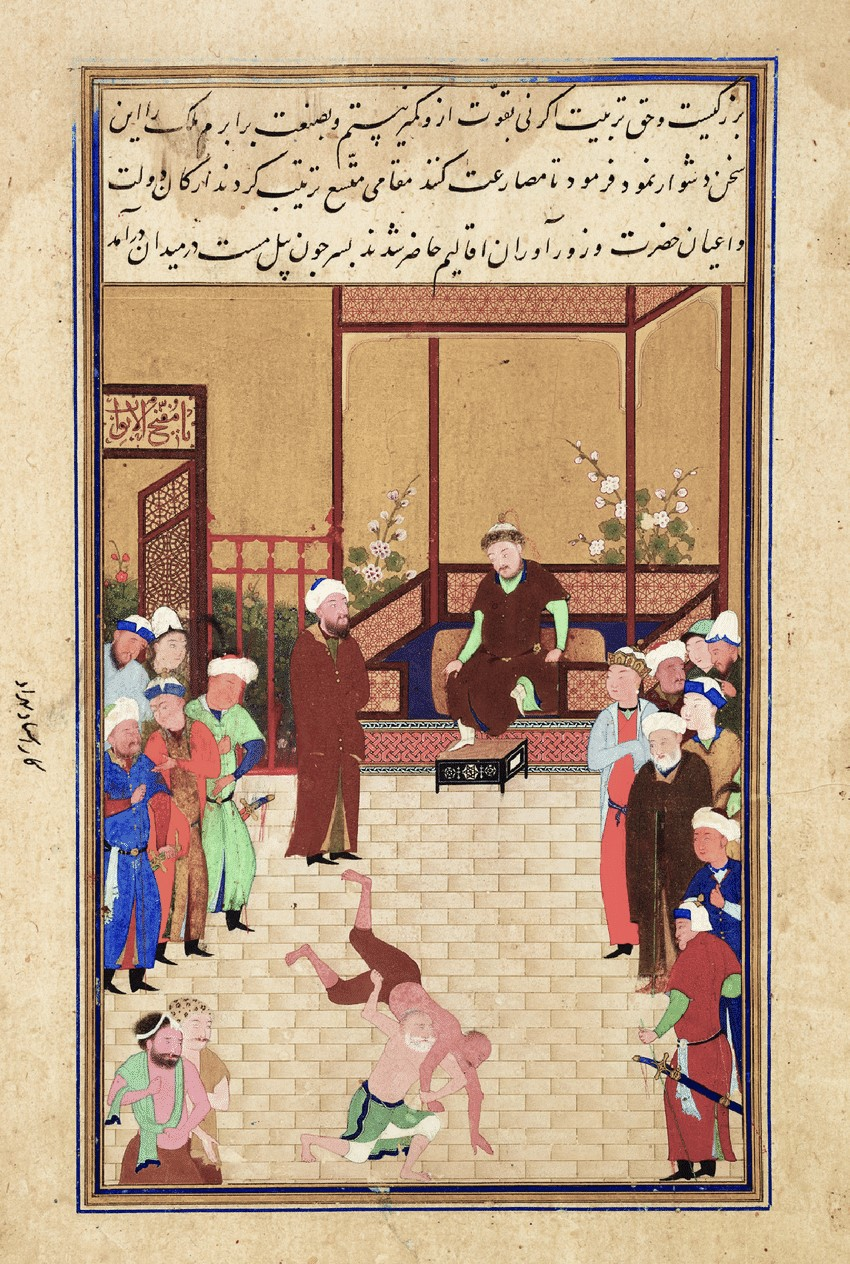
- A manuscript of the Gulistan illustrating a Timurid court scene, with Sultan Husayn Bayqara in conversation with a figure, possibly Majd al-Din Muhammad Khvafi
- Died: August 1494
- Occupation: Bureaucrat
- Years active: 1450s–1490
- Relatives: Ghiyath al-Din Pir Ahmad Khvafi (father)

Majd al-Din Muhammad Khvafi (Persian: مجد الدین محمد خوافی; died August 1494) was a Persian bureaucrat, who was one of the leading figures of the Timurid Empire in the late 15th-century. Belonging to a family of bureaucrats from Khvaf, Majd al-Din dominated the government of Sultan Husayn Bayqara (r. 1469–1506) in 1472–1478 and 1487–1490. He was ultimately dismissed in 1490, and later murdered by the hands of his rivals en route to Mecca.

== Background and early career ==
Belonging to a family native to the Khvaf region in the eastern Iranian region of Khorasan, Majd al-Din was a son of Ghiyath al-Din Pir Ahmad Khvafi (d. 1453), who had occupied high offices under the Timurids, serving as the most powerful and longest enduring vizier of king Shah Rukh (r. 1405–1447) from 1417 to 1447. As sedentary Tajiks (Iranians) (Note: In Majd al-Din's lifetime, Tajik (Tazik) was a synonym for Iranian.) from Khorasan, the family was part of the hereditary class of secretaries, tax collectors and accountants, who had normally served the ruling Turco-Mongol elite. They were possibly descended from Khvaja Majd, who ruled in Khvaf in the early 14th-century. Majd al-Din started his career his career as a munshi (scribe) in the chancery of Abu Sa'id Mirza (r. 1451–1469), where he shared power with the prominent bureaucrat Nizam al-Din Abd al-Hayy Munshi. He later appears as the vizier of Sultan-Ahmad's son Muhammad-Sultan, during Sultan Husayn Bayqara's accession to power in Herat in 1469. When the latter was informed of Majd al-Din's bureaucratic prowess, he appointed him as his bureaucrat.

== Service under Sultan Husayn Bayqara ==
=== First term ===
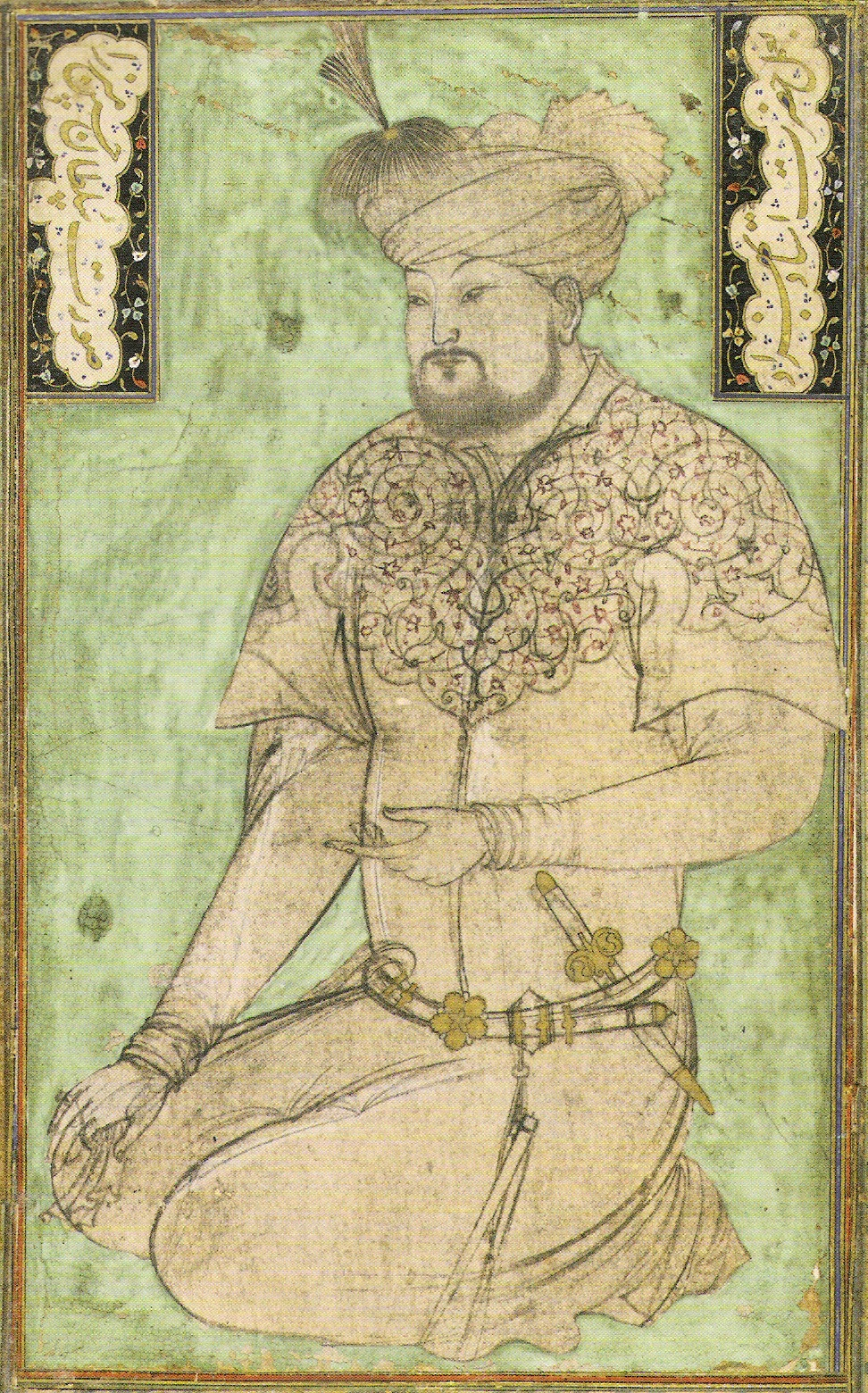
A portrait of Sultan Husayn Bayqara, from an early illustrated manuscript

There Majd al-Din first served him as a mustaufi (accountant). Promising Husayn Bayqara to restore the Timurid economy, he was guaranteed to later gain free rein in the fiscal administration and tax accumulation. According to the Baburnama, Majd al-Din promised him that; "Before long, the peasant will prosper, the soldier will be content, and the treasury will be full." In the spring of 1472, Majd al-Din was promoted to the high-ranking post of parvanachi (the head of the financial affairs), which also gave him the authority to attach his seal on all government documents. Seals were commonly used in the medieval Persian chancery, the most prominent one being the great royal seal (muhr-i buzurg, muhr-i kalan, muhr-i humayun) and the seal of the parvana (muhr-i parvana).

The ability to present petitions to the court, document all the proceedings, and authorize all decrees were all delegated to Majd al-Din only, which made the contemporary Persian historian Khvandamir (died 1535/6) refer him as Husayn Bayqara's "deputy." Majd al-Din's power now matched that of the leading amirs (military commanders) of the court. He notably became a member of the royal household/guard establishment, a right that the Turkic military elite normally enjoyed. This was not the first time a Persian had gained this right; this had also occurred to Rashid al-Din Hamadani (died 1318), a vizier of the Ilkhanate. This was not received well amongst the amirs, who under Hasan-Shaykh Temür, complained to Husayn Bayqara that their privileges had been transgressed. Majd al-Din was notably supported by the influential Turkic statesman Ali-Shir Nava'i, who argued that the court did not have to stick to the traditions of the past, but should try new methods by elevating competent people to administrative posts. With his newly gained authority, Majd-Din restored stability to the bureaucracy and agriculture in Khorasan. Due to Majd al-Din's deputyship and the amirship of Ali-Shir, the Timurid state experienced a resurgence.

However, Majd al-Din had achieved this by strengthening his authority to the point that everything had to go through his approval. This was met with resentment by the divan and his peers, including the viziers Khvaja Qivam al-Din Nizam al-Mulk Khvafi and Khvaja Afzal al-Din Muhammad Kirmani, who plotted to have him dismissed through a charge of embezzlement. Pressurized by these two highly competent bureaucrats, Husayn Bayqara first had Majd al-Din jailed (as was the tradition), and then started an investigation into the charge. An error on the part of the accusers, resulted in the release of Majd al-Din and drop of the charge. In 1478, all of Majd al-Din's government posts were taken from him by Husayn Bayqara, with the exception of that of parvanachi, which he was made to share with Amir Muhammad-Ali Ätäkä Töshäkchi.

For the next nine years, Husayn Bayqara made several attempts to reinstate Majd al-Din, but this was met with strong objection by Ali-Shir, who led a coalition of amirs who opposed Majd al-Din. Majd al-Din was first restored to his former position in 1487, after Ali-Shir was expelled from the court and been forced to take up the governorship of Astarabad on the Caspian coast.

=== Second term ===
One of the reasons for Majd al-Din's reinstatement was his capability of raising a large surge of funds for the Timurid treasury, which Husayn Bayqara urgently needed. Majd al-Din accomplished by accusing his former accusers, Nizam al-Mulk and Afzal al-Din of stealing money from the treasury. Afzal al-Din managed to escape to Ali-Shir at Astarabad under the guise of having to deal with some divan matters, while Nizam al-Mulk and his sons were arrested and had their possessions seized. However, the possibility of the amirs and confidants of Husayn Bayqara to support Nizam al-Mulk led to Majd al-Din to release the latter and restore him as vizier provided that he would not oppose him again. After this, Majd al-Din's power remained unchallenged for some time. During this period, Majd al-Din attempted to initiate a series of fiscal reforms in order to curb corruption and organize and coordinate the financial administration. He conducted a comprehensive investigation of financial misconduct by divan officials, arresting, interrogating anyone who was under suspicion, as well as confiscating their possessions. According to Khvandamir, Majd al-Din collected approximately 10 million dinars during the investigation.

This resulted in a heavy reduction in bribes and other exploits, just as Majd al-Din wanted. A similar attempt was around the same time being made by Qazi Isa Savaji (died 1491) under the Aq Qoyunlu, and had in similar fashion been attempted by Rashid al-Din Hamadani under the Ilkhanate.

Majd al-Din served Husayn Bayqara for the remainder of his life, until his death in August 1494.

== Patronage ==
The prolific Persian writer Husayn Kashifi (d. 1504) is known to have composed his Lavayih al-Qamar (also known as Ikhtiyarat al-Nujum) in 1473/4 at the request of Majd al-Din.

== Sources ==
- Manz, Beatrice Forbes (2007). Power, Politics and Religion in Timurid Iran. Cambridge University Press. ISBN 978-1-139-46284-6.
- Melville, Charles (2016). "The End of the Ilkhanate and After: Observations on the Collapse of the Mongol World Empire". In Nicola, Bruno; Melville, Charles (eds.). The Mongols' Middle East: Continuity and Transformation in Ilkhanid Iran. Brill. pp. 307–335. ISBN 978-9004311992.
- Perry, John (2009). "Tajik i. The Ethnonym: Origins and Application". Encyclopædia Iranica, online edition. New York.
- Subtelny, Maria (2007). Timurids in Transition: Turko-Persian Politics and Acculturation in Medieval Iran. Brill. ISBN 978-90-04-16031-6.
- Subtelny, Maria (2011). "Kāšefi, Kamāl-al-Din Ḥosayn Wāʿeż". Encyclopædia Iranica, Vol. XV, online edition, Fasc. 6. New York. pp. 658–661.
- Tourkin, Sergei; Vesel, Živa (2003). "The Contribution of Husayn Va'iz-i Kashifi to the Transmission of Astrological Texts". Iranian Studies. 36 (4): 589–599. doi:10.1080/021086032000139249. JSTOR 4311584. S2CID 163507439. (registration required)
