= Timurid architecture =

Architecture of the Timurid Empire

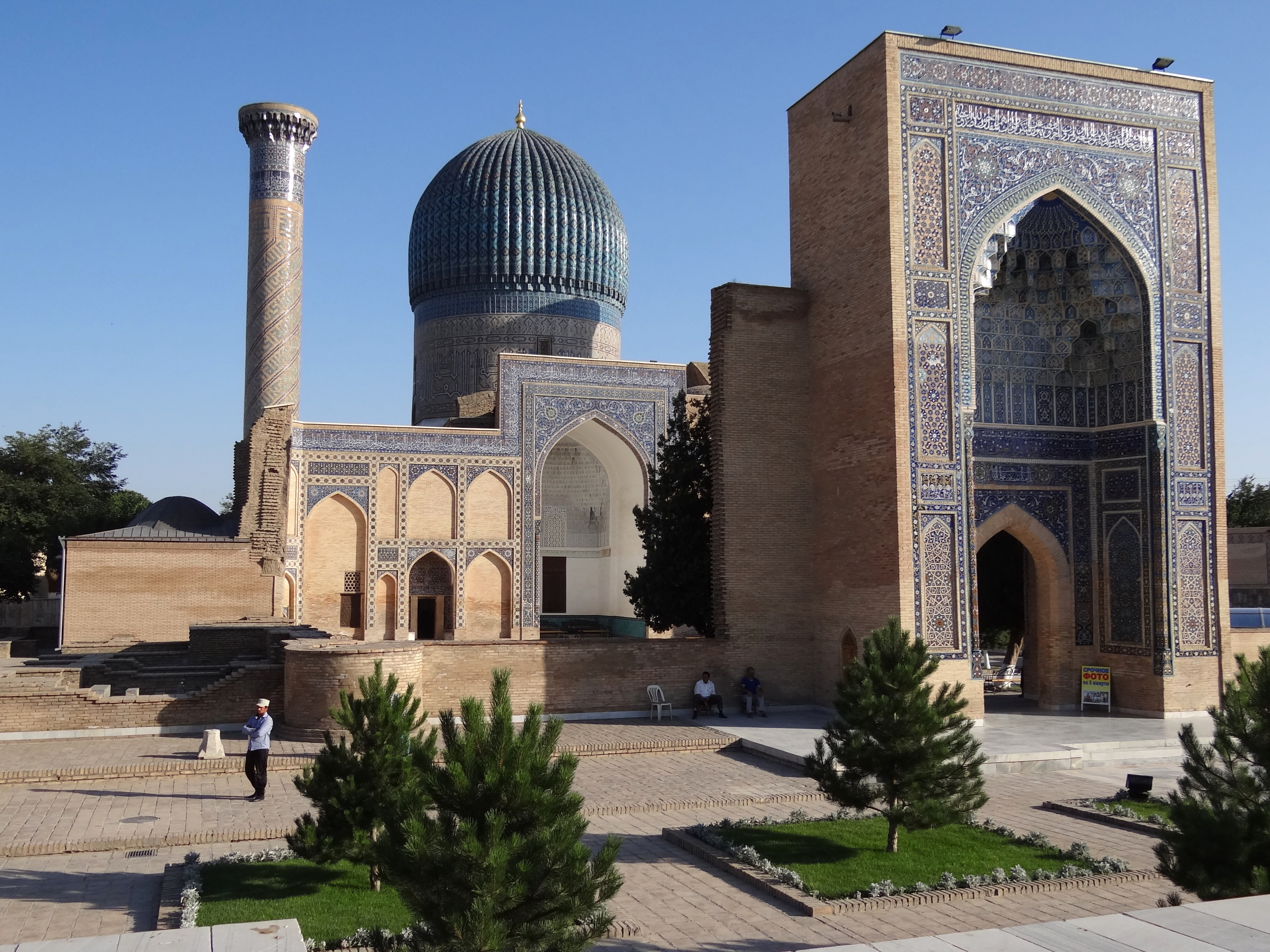
Gur-i Amir Mausoleum in Samarkand, which contains the tomb of Timur (d. 1405), the founder of the Timurid Empire

Timurid architecture was an important stage in the architectural history of Iran and Central Asia during the late 14th and 15th centuries. The Timurid Empire (1370–1507), founded by Timur (d. 1405) and conquering most of this region, oversaw a cultural renaissance. In architecture, the Timurid dynasty patronized the construction of palaces, mausoleums, and religious monuments across the region. Their architecture is distinguished by its grand scale, luxurious decoration in tilework, and sophisticated geometric vaulting. This architectural style, along with other aspects of Timurid art, spread across the empire and subsequently influenced the architecture of other empires from the Middle East to the Indian subcontinent.

== Characteristics ==
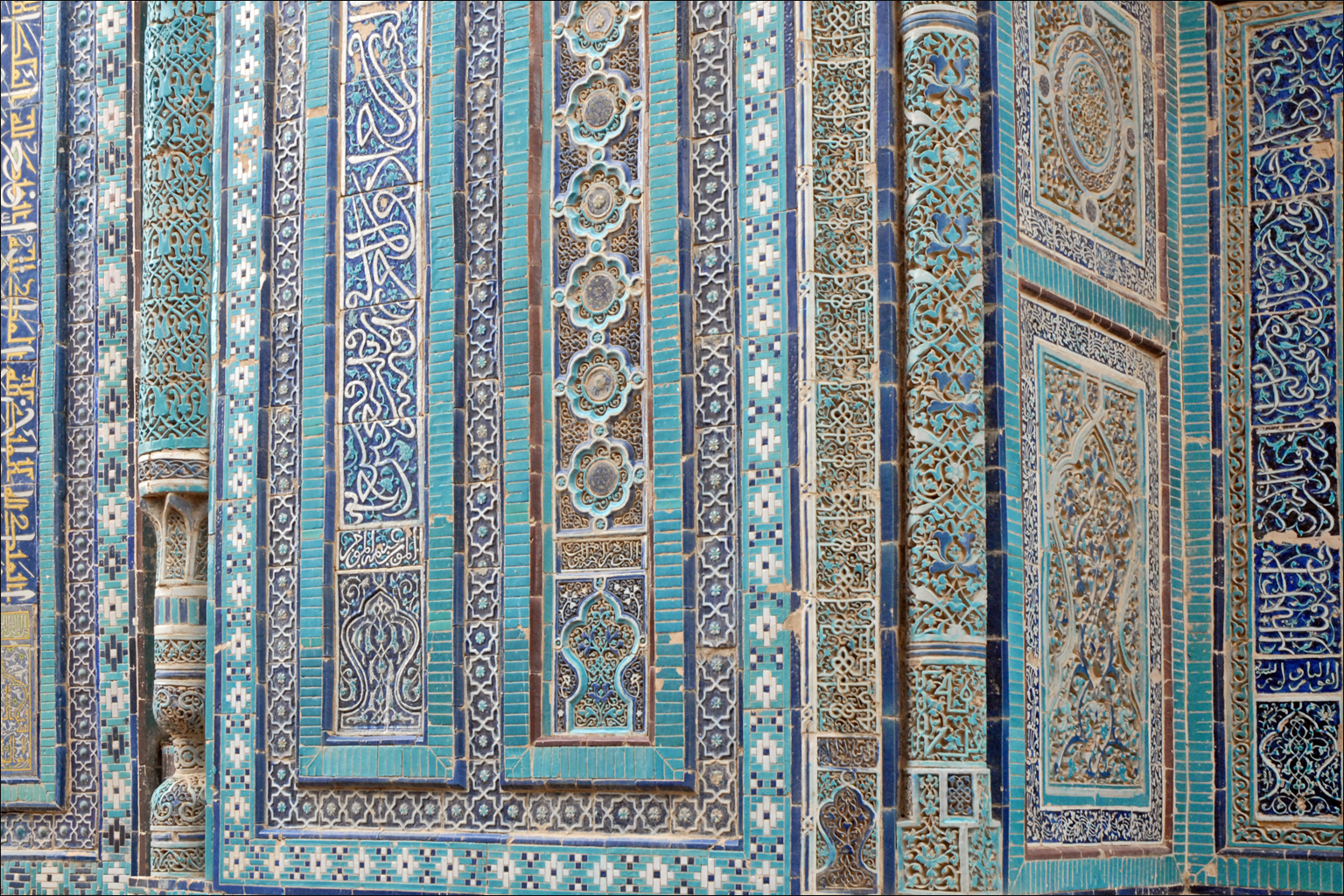
Example of tile decoration at the Shah-i Zinda in Samarkand (late 14th and 15th centuries)

Timurid architecture continued the tradition of Ilkhanid architecture, building monuments with an unprecedented scale and lavish decoration intended to impress, but it also refined previous designs and techniques. Timurid rulers recruited the best craftsmen from their conquered territories or even forced them to move to the Timurid capital.

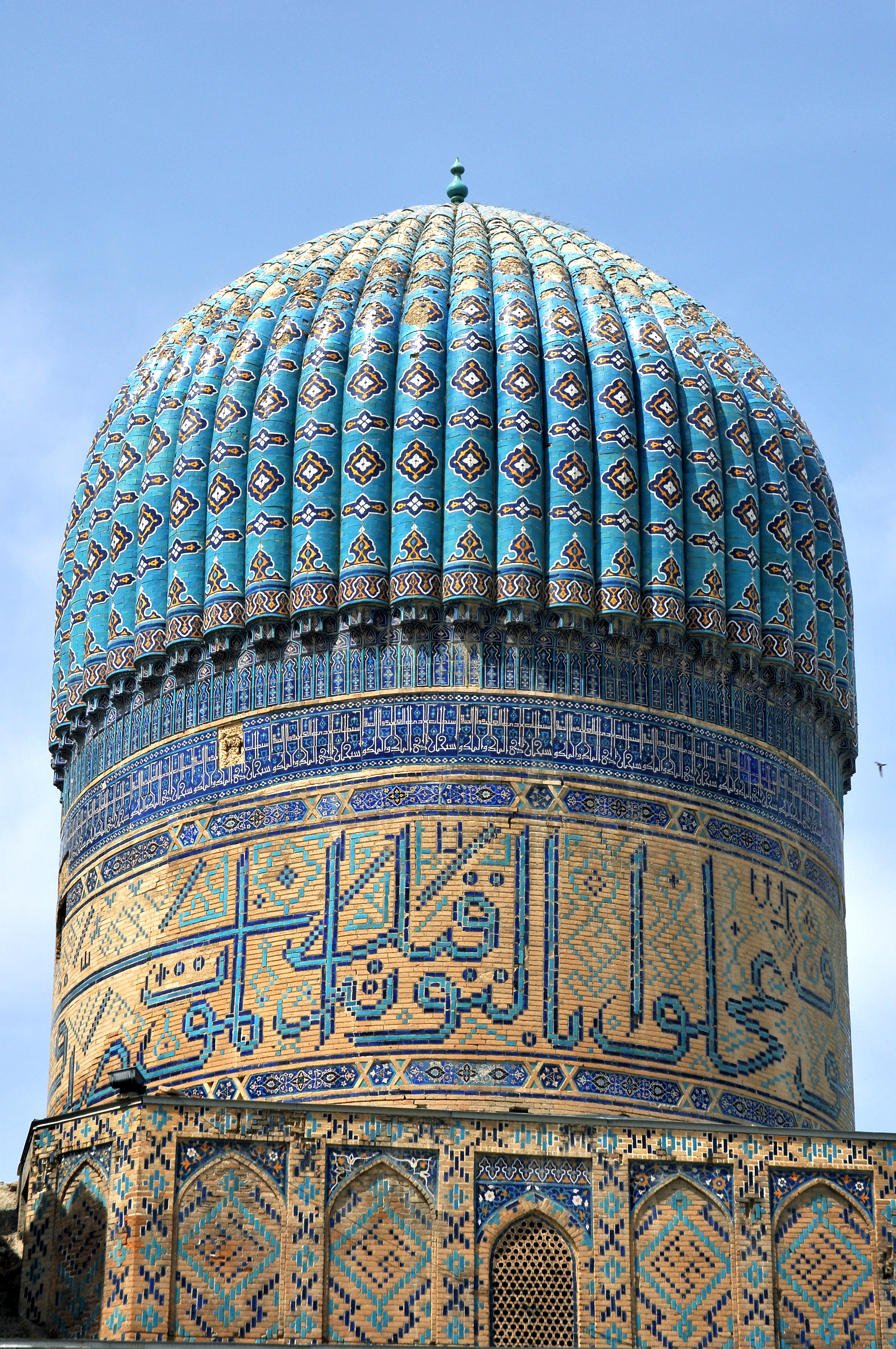
Ribbed onion dome at the Bibi Khanum Mosque in Samarkand (1399–1405)

Brick was used as the main construction material, as it was during previous periods in this region. To cover large brick surfaces with colorful decoration, the banna'i tiling technique was used to create geometric patterns and Kufic inscriptions at relatively low cost, while more expensive tile mosaic, developed in previous periods, continued to be used for more curvilinear floral patterns. Another decorative tile technique attested in this period is the haft-rang underglaze ceramic tiles (related to the cuerda seca tilework). Tiles were favoured on the outside of buildings as they were more resistant to the elements. On the inside, walls were often covered with a paper-mâché-like plaster which was painted, gilt, and carved with reliefs. Marble paneling was also used in some monuments.

Many Timurid religious monuments are marked by prominent domes. They are usually double-shelled, consisting of an inner dome visible from the inside and a taller, outer dome visible from the outside. On the outside, the domes are supported on a tall, cylindrical drum and have an onion shape (i.e. bulging on the sides and pointed at the top). They are covered with predominantly turquoise tile decoration and sometimes are fluted or ribbed.

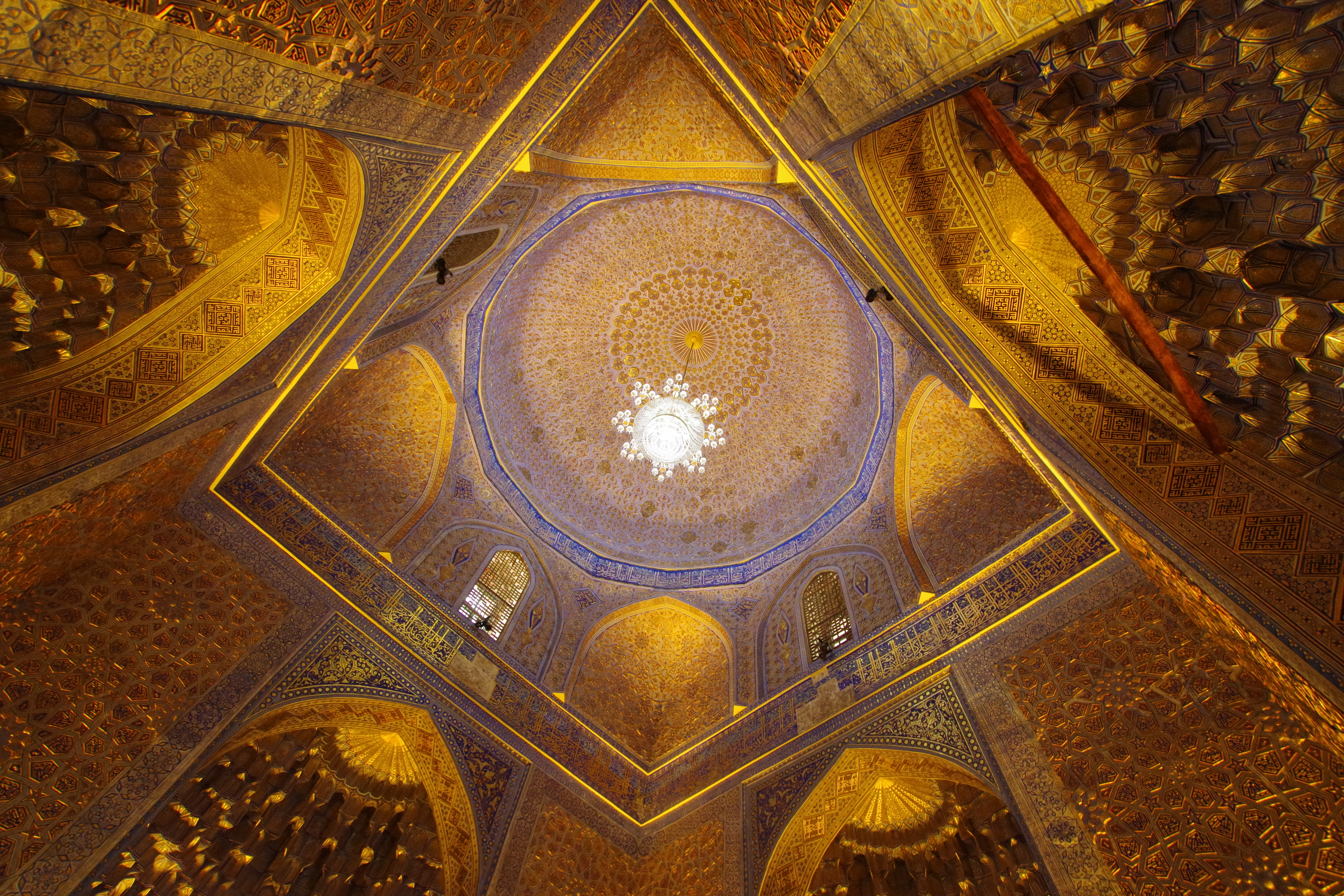
Interior of the dome of the Gur-i Amir Mausoleum, showing the transition between the square chamber below and the round dome above

On the inside, the structural support of Timurid domes differed from earlier Iranian domes. Traditionally, domes rested on an octagonal base formed by four squinches transitioning from the square chamber below. In Timurid monuments, the dome is supported on a set of arches built over the edges of the square chamber. The transition between the square hall below and these supporting arches above is accomplished by squinches at the corners, while the small spaces between the top of the arches are occupied by concave spandrels which join together to form a more circular base for the dome itself above. This made the vertical transition between chamber and dome much more dynamic.

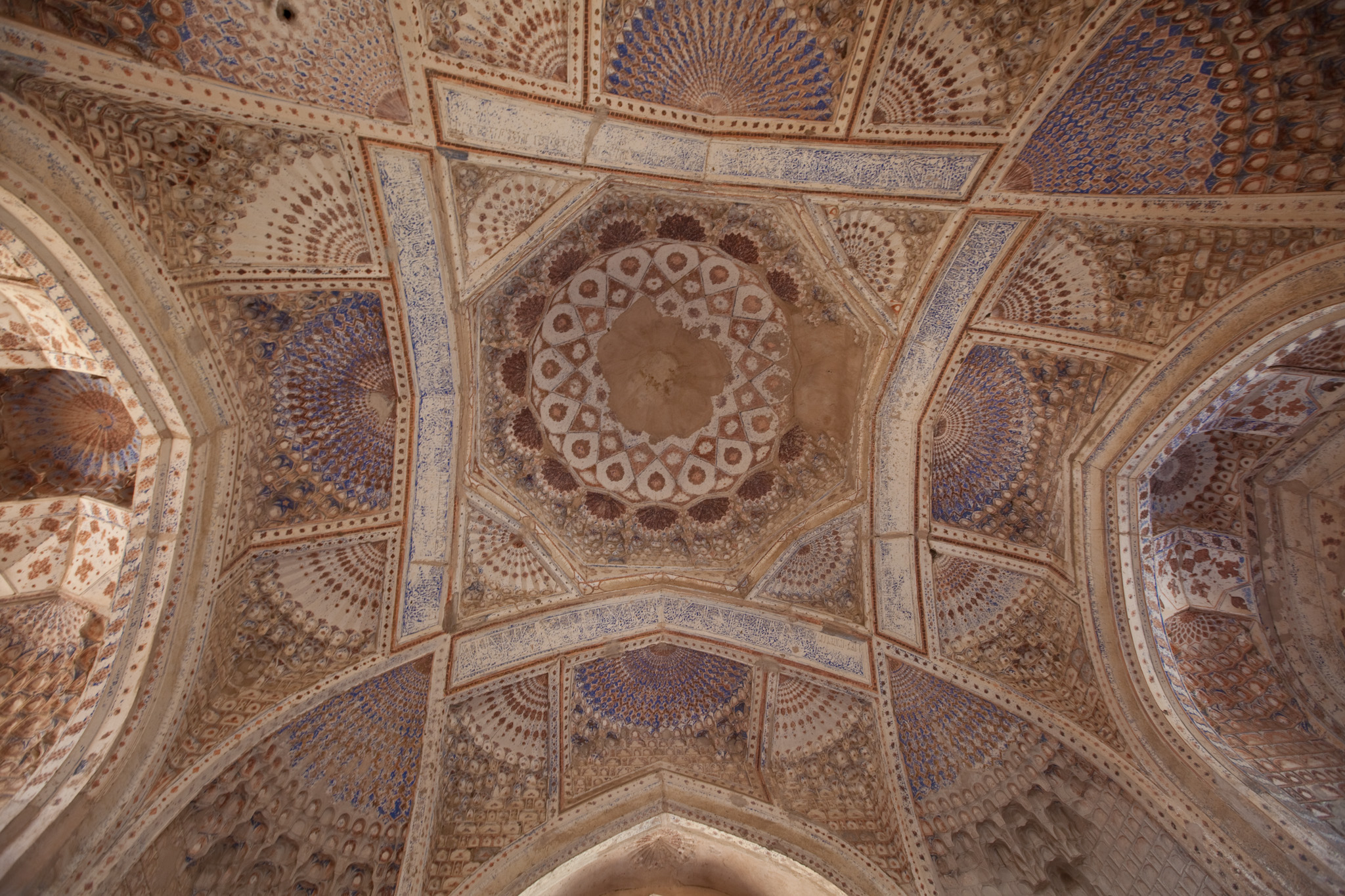
Squinch-net vaulting inside the Gawhar Shad Mausoleum in Herat (early 15th century)

Another important Timurid innovation was the more sophisticated and fluid arrangement of geometric vaulting in general. Large vaults were divided by intersecting ribs into smaller vaults which could then be further subdivided or filled with muqarnas and other types of decoration. Muqarnas (also known as "stalactite" or "honeycomb" sculpting) was also rendered more complex than before by using smaller individual cells to create the three-dimensional geometric forms. Visual balance could be achieved by alternating one type or pattern of decoration with another between the different subdivisions of the vault. By combining this vaulting technique, also known as "squinch-net" vaulting, with a cruciform plan and by breaking the solid mass of supporting walls with open arches and windows, the formerly strict division between dome, squinch, and wall was dissolved and an endless diversity of elaborate interior spaces could be created.

== Overview of monuments ==
=== Monuments from Timur's reign ===
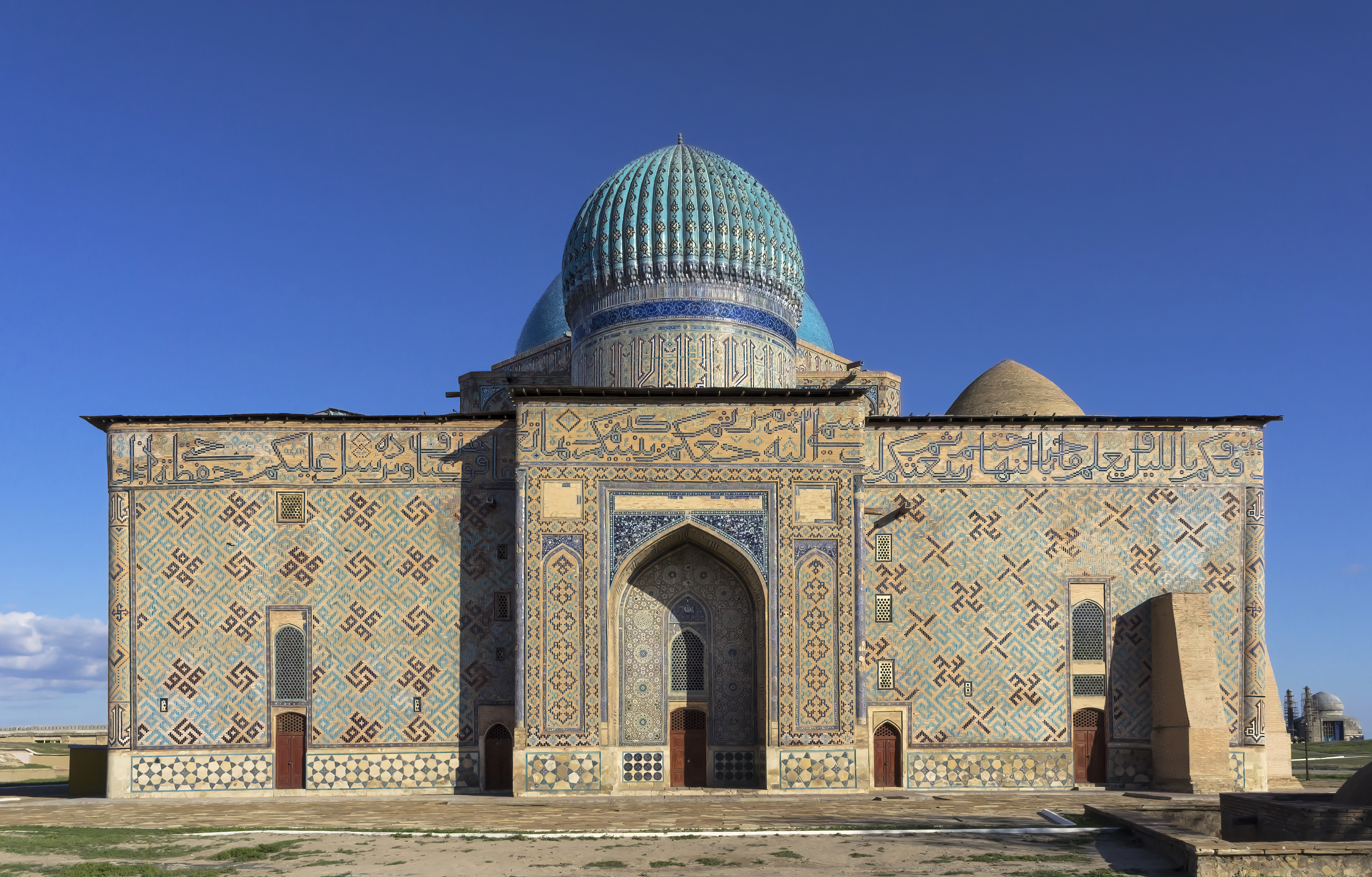
Mausoleum of Khoja Ahmed Yasawi (1389–1399) in Hazrat-e Turkestan, Kazakhstan

The most significant preserved Timurid monuments are found in and around the cities of Khorasan and Transoxiana, including Samarkand, Bukhara, Herat, and Mashhad. The monuments of Timur's reign (r. 1370–1405) are distinguished by their size. One of the earliest major works under Timur is the Mausoleum of Khoja Ahmed Yasawi in the city of Turkestan (present-day Kazakhstan). This massive funerary complex, built around the tomb of a local Sufi and Muslim saint, Ahmad Yasawi, was built between 1389 and 1399. It features a surprisingly complicated but rationally organized layout of rooms inside a rectangular floor plan.

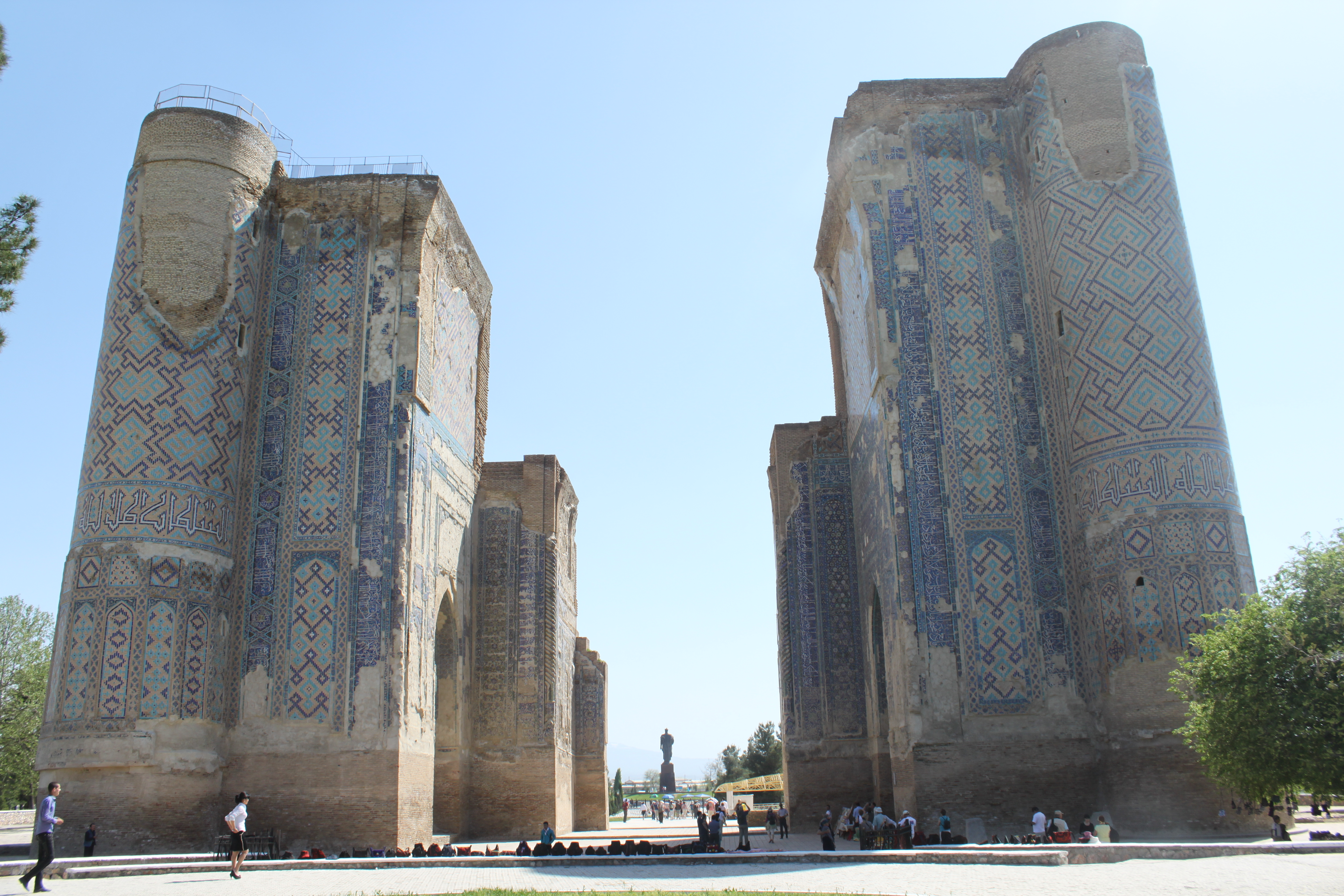
Remains of the Ak-Saray Palace at Shahr-i Sabz

Other major monuments from Timur's time include the Bibi Khanum Mosque and the Gur-i Amir Mausoleum, both in his capital, Samarkand, and the Ak-Saray Palace at Shahr-i Sabz. The Gur-i Amir Mausoleum and the Bibi Khanum Mosque are distinguished by their lavish interior and exterior decoration, imposing portals, and prominent domes. Representative of domes in the Timurid era, each of these domes is supported on a tall, cylindrical drum and has an onion shape (pointed at the top and bulging on the sides), covered with predominantly turquoise tile decoration. Some of the domes are fluted or ribbed. The Ak-Saray ("White Palace") was Timur's winter palace, built between 1379 and 1396. Only the imposing ruins of its massive entrance gate are still visible today.

The Gur-i Amir Mausoleum, which served as the resting place of Timur and some of his successors, was added at the beginning of the 15th century to a larger complex including a madrasa and a khanqah, which were built in the late 14th century. These elements stand around a courtyard with a monumental entrance.

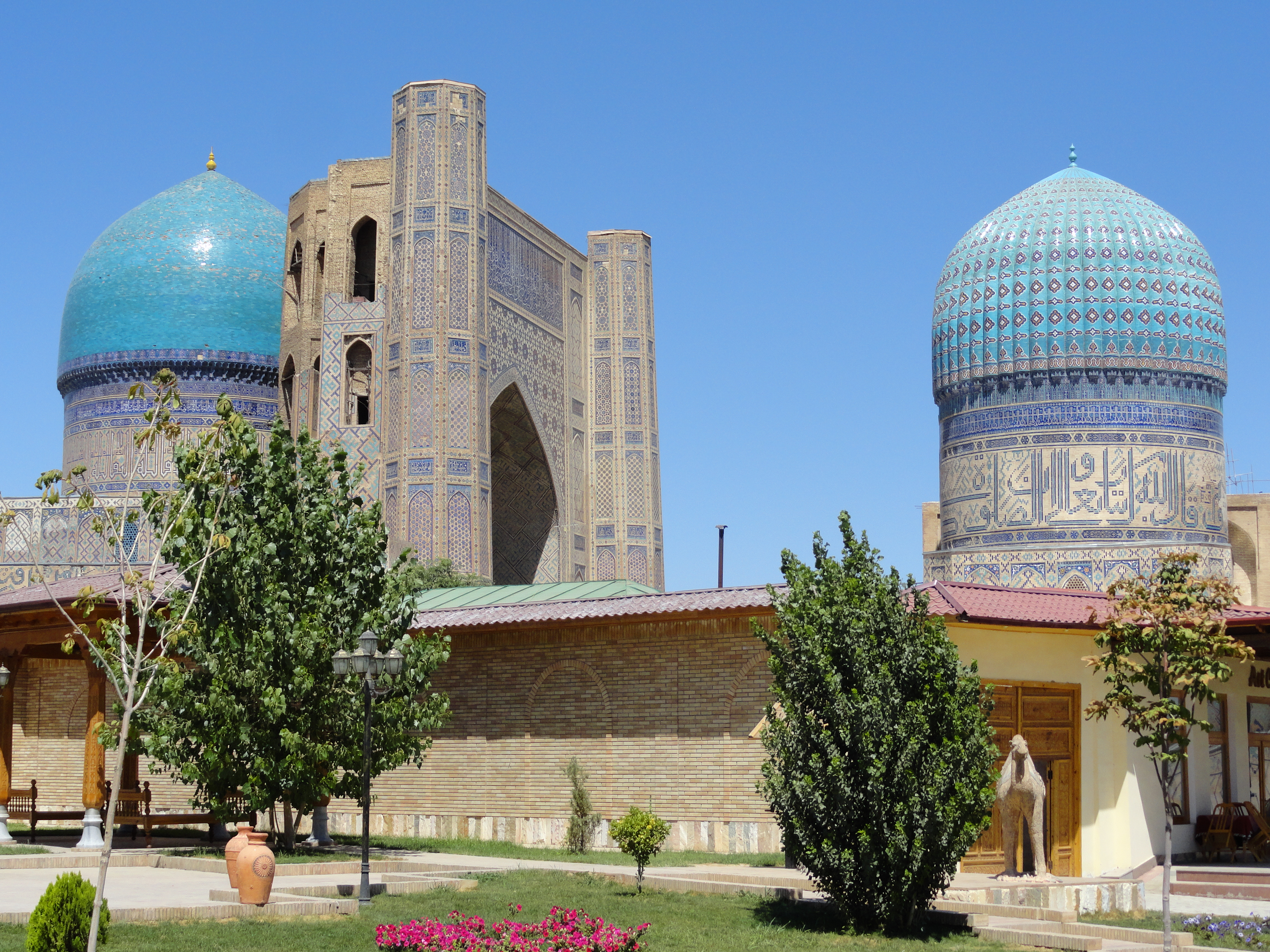
Bibi Khanum Mosque in Samarkand (1399–1405)

The Bibi Khanum Mosque, built between 1399 and 1405, was one of the largest mosques in the world when it was built and is named after Timur's wife, whose mausoleum stands across from it. Designed as a congregational mosque, it was entered via an imposing portal that leads to a large courtyard surrounded by four iwans, per the traditional layout of congregational mosques in the region. Except on the entrance side, each iwan leads to a domed chamber behind it. The eastern iwan is much larger and more elaborate and leads to the main prayer hall, covered by the largest dome of the building. Four thin minarets are also arranged symmetrically along the mosque's front façade.

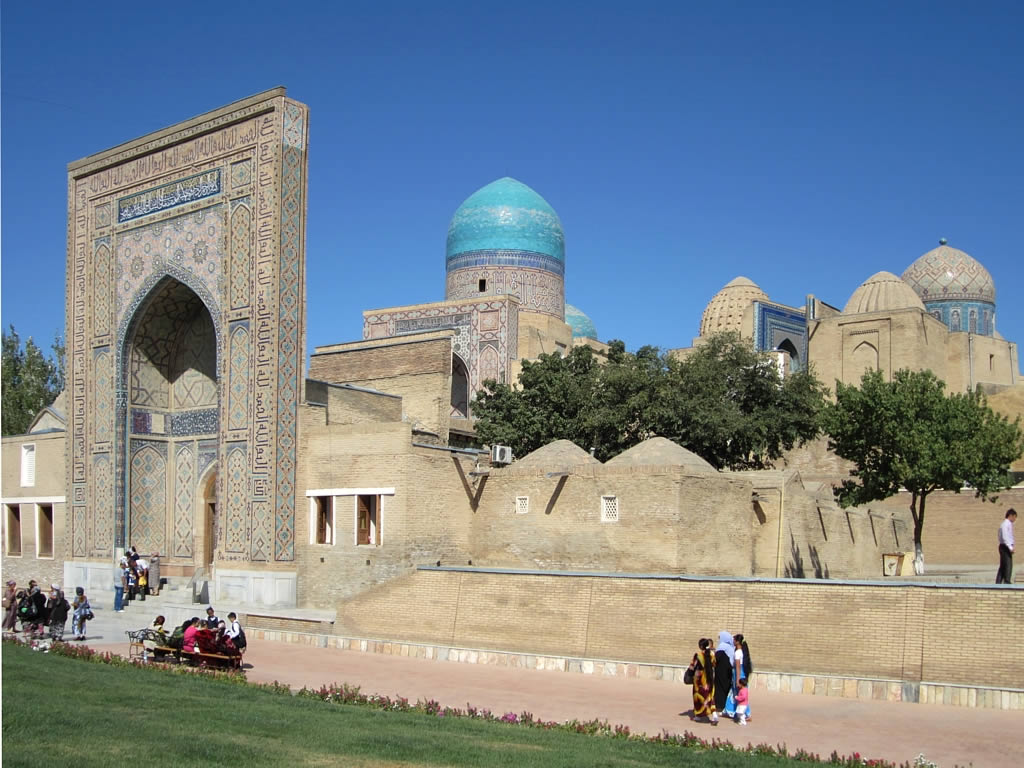
View from the entrance of the Shah-i Zinda in Samarkand (late 14th and 15th centuries)

Other Timurid mausoleums for royal relatives and high officials were built as smaller and more traditional domed structures. Many can be found in the Shah-i Zinda necropolis in Samarkand. This cemetery had already been in use long before this period, but it had fallen into neglect and was redeveloped into a monumental necropolis under Timur and his successors. The major mausoleums here are lined along a narrow street and feature rich decoration, restored in modern times.

=== After Timur ===
Timur's successors also built extensively, although on a somewhat smaller scale. Under Timur's son and successor, Shah Rukh (r. 1405–1447), the capital was moved from Samarkand to Herat (present-day Afghanistan), He revived the city by rebuilding its bazaar, renovating its citadel, and building a madrasa combined with a khanqah. The madrasa-khanqah became a recurring type of building commissioned by later patrons in the city.

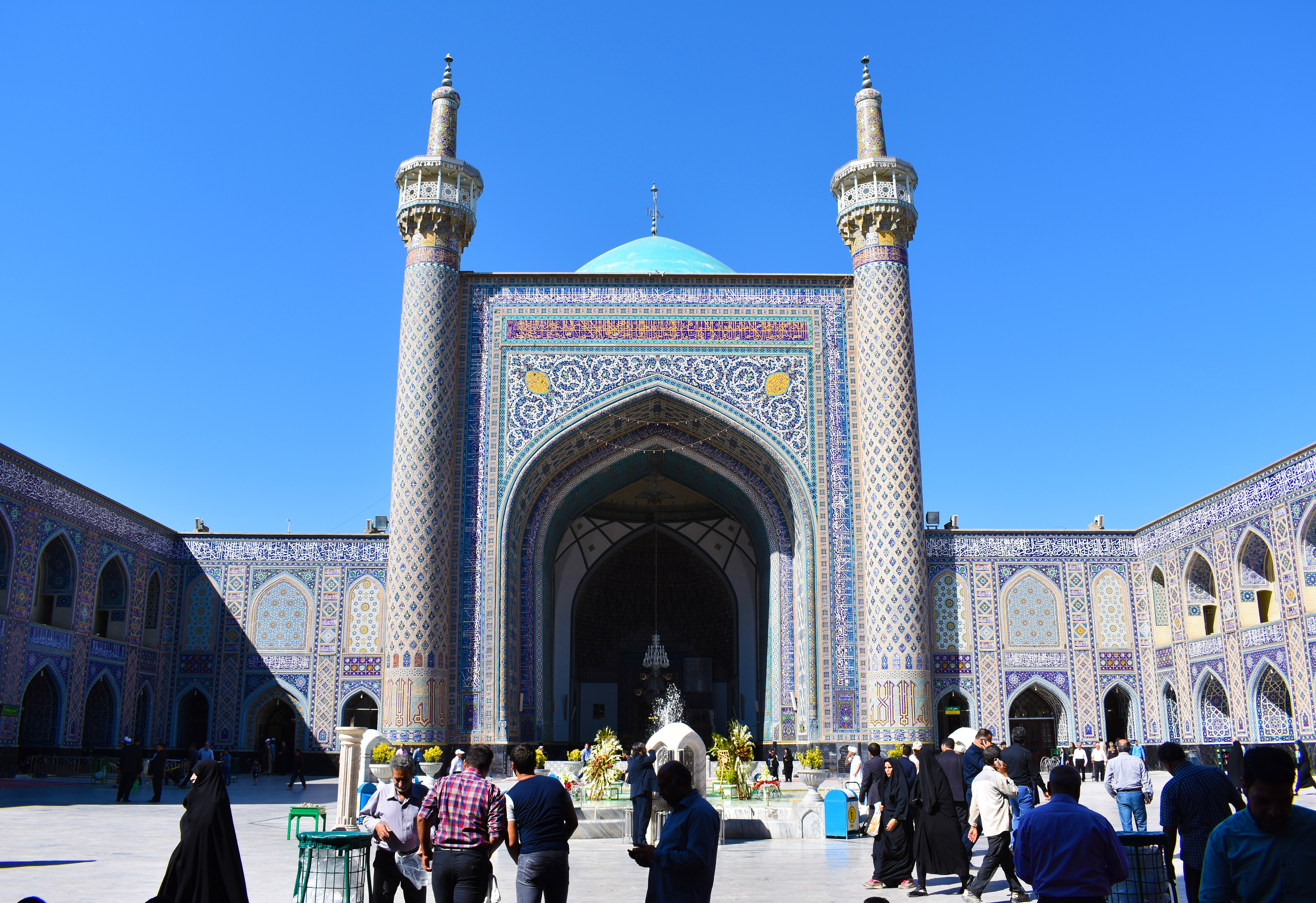
Courtyard of Gawhar Shad's Mosque (1416–1418) at the Imam Reza Shrine in Mashhad

Shah Rukh's wife, Gawhar Shad (d. 1457), was one of the most important patrons of architecture during the first half of the 15th century and during this period Timurid architecture attained the height of its sophistication. Her monuments were mainly found in Mashhad and Herat. In Mashhad, she commissioned the restoration of the Shrine of Imam Reza and built a congregational mosque next to it, which took place between 1416 and 1418. The mosque, still present today within the much-expanded complex and known as the Goharshad Mosque, consists of a four-iwan courtyard attached to the shrine. It is richly decorated with mosaic tilework and with elaborate muqarnas vaulting over the mihrab area.

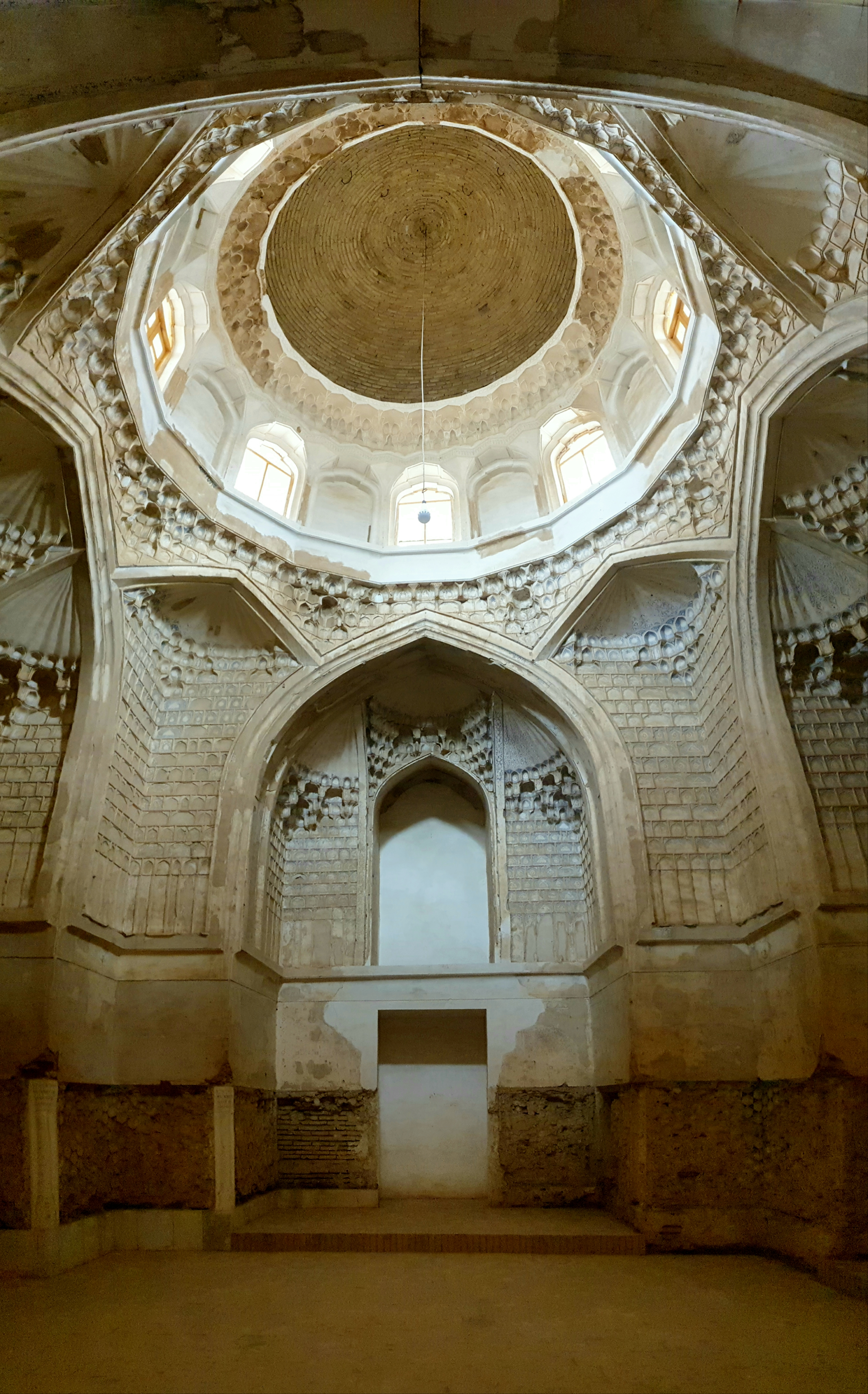
Ghiyathiyya Madrasa in Khargird (c. 1444), prayer hall with muqarnas, squinch-net vaulting, and lantern dome

Some of Gawhar Shad's monuments in Herat have been destroyed or severely damaged since the 19th century, including her mausoleum and mosque complex built between 1417 and 1438, which was partly demolished by the British in 1885. The mausoleum's surviving section nonetheless demonstrates the high quality of her architectural patronage, evidenced by the highly advanced interior vaulting and decoration. Its architect was Qavam al-Din al-Shirazi, the chief royal architect under Shah Rukh, who also worked on the mosque in Mashhad and other commissions.

Qavam al-Din's last work was on the Ghiyathiyya Madrasa (or Madrasa al-Ghiyasiyya) in Khargird, which was commissioned by Ghiyath al-Din Pir Ahmad Khwafi, a vizier under Shah Rukh. An inscription dates its completion to 1444, but as Qavam al-Din died in 1438, it was finished by an architect named Ghiyas al-Din Shirazi. The madrasa's architecture shows a further culmination of certain design elements. Its tile-decorated courtyard is rectangular but has beveled corners which help to integrate all four façades with each other. Two chambers on either side of the entrance – one identified as a prayer hall and the other as a lecture hall – have a sophisticated system of squinch-net vaulting and muqarnas, combined in this case with a lantern dome that allows light to enter.

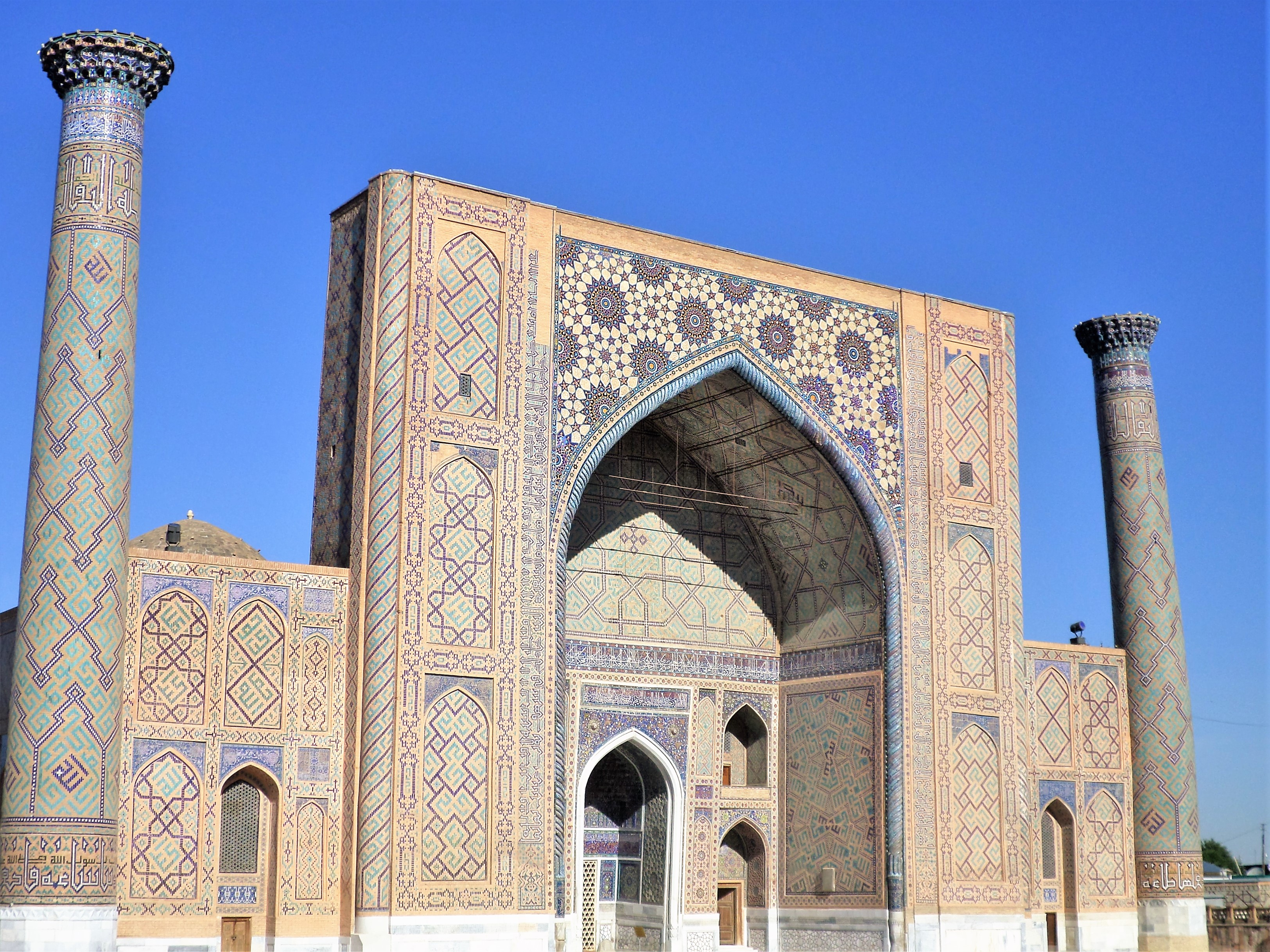
Façade of the Ulugh Beg Madrasa at the Registan in Samarkand (1417–1420)

Under Ulugh Beg (r. 1447–1449), the Registan Square in Samarkand was first transformed into a monumental complex similar to what it is today. He built three structures around the square, of which only the Ulugh Beg Madrasa (1417–1420) survives today, (Note: The two other monumental structures that stand around the square today were built in the 17th century.) with a large façade covered by a rich variety of decoration. He also built an astronomical observatory in 1420, which has been partially preserved and uncovered by 20th-century excavations. It originally was a cylindrical three-story building that contained a giant sextant, sundial, and sector.

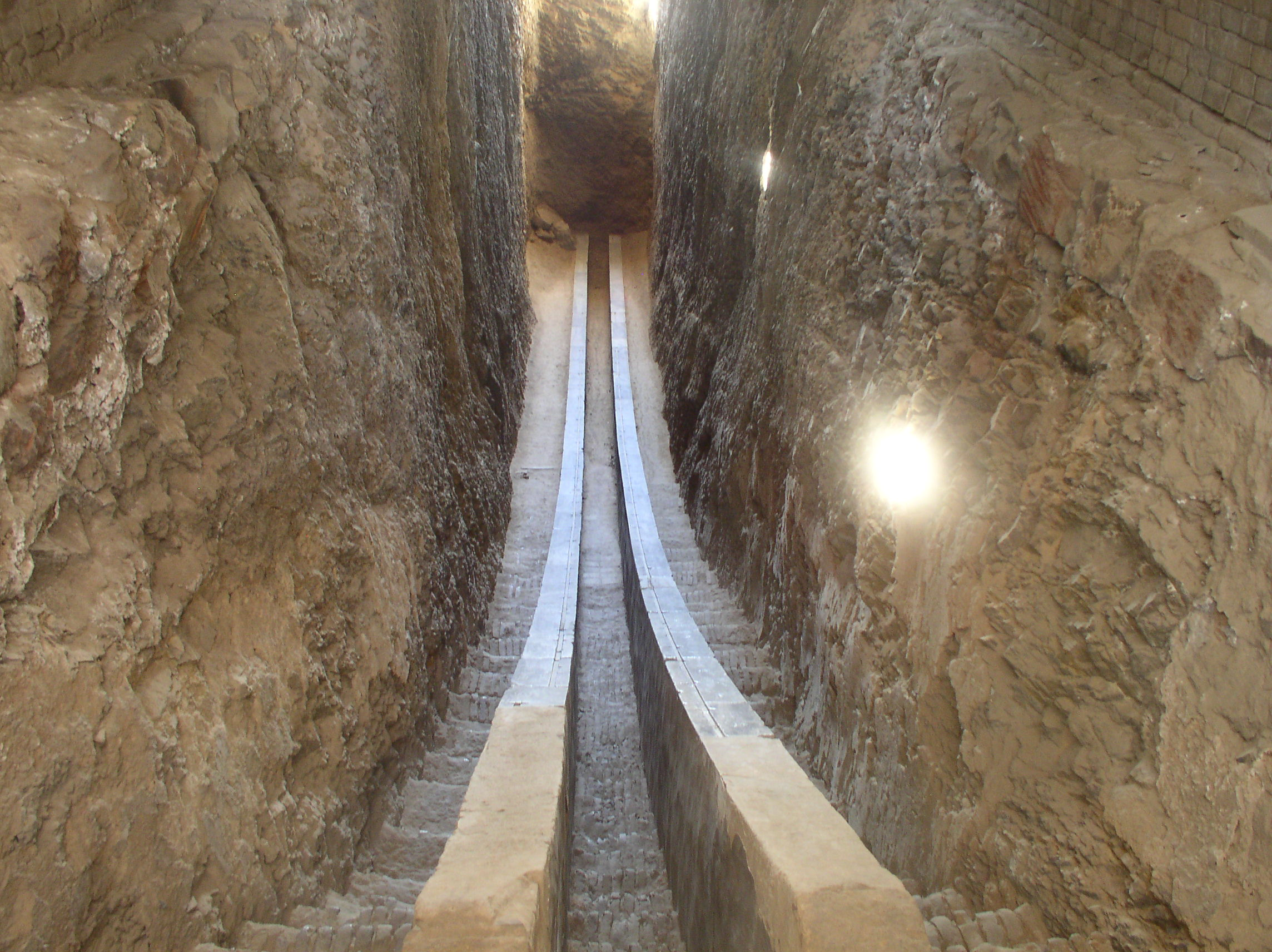
Remains of giant sextant in the Ulugh Beg Observatory in Samarkand (1420)

Many new constructions occurred in the second half of the 15th century, but far fewer of these have survived to the present day. Sultan Husayn Bayqara (r. 1469–1506), the last significant Timurid ruler, was a prolific builder, though his projects were limited to Herat and the areas he still controlled around it. He created a vast garden, Bagh-i Jahanara, to the northeast of the city in 1469. In 1492–3, he built a large new madrasa-khanqah to the north of Gawhar Shad's mausoleum. Only the complex's four minarets remain standing today, though they retain elaborate tile decoration attesting to the monument's richness. He also expanded the Hazrat Ali Mazar, the shrine of Ali ibn Abi Talib, in Mazar-i Sharif towards 1480. His vizier, Ali-Shir Nava'i, also contributed to the restoration of many shrines and mosques in the city, in addition to building his own religious complex known as the Ikhlasiyya.

== Legacy and influence ==
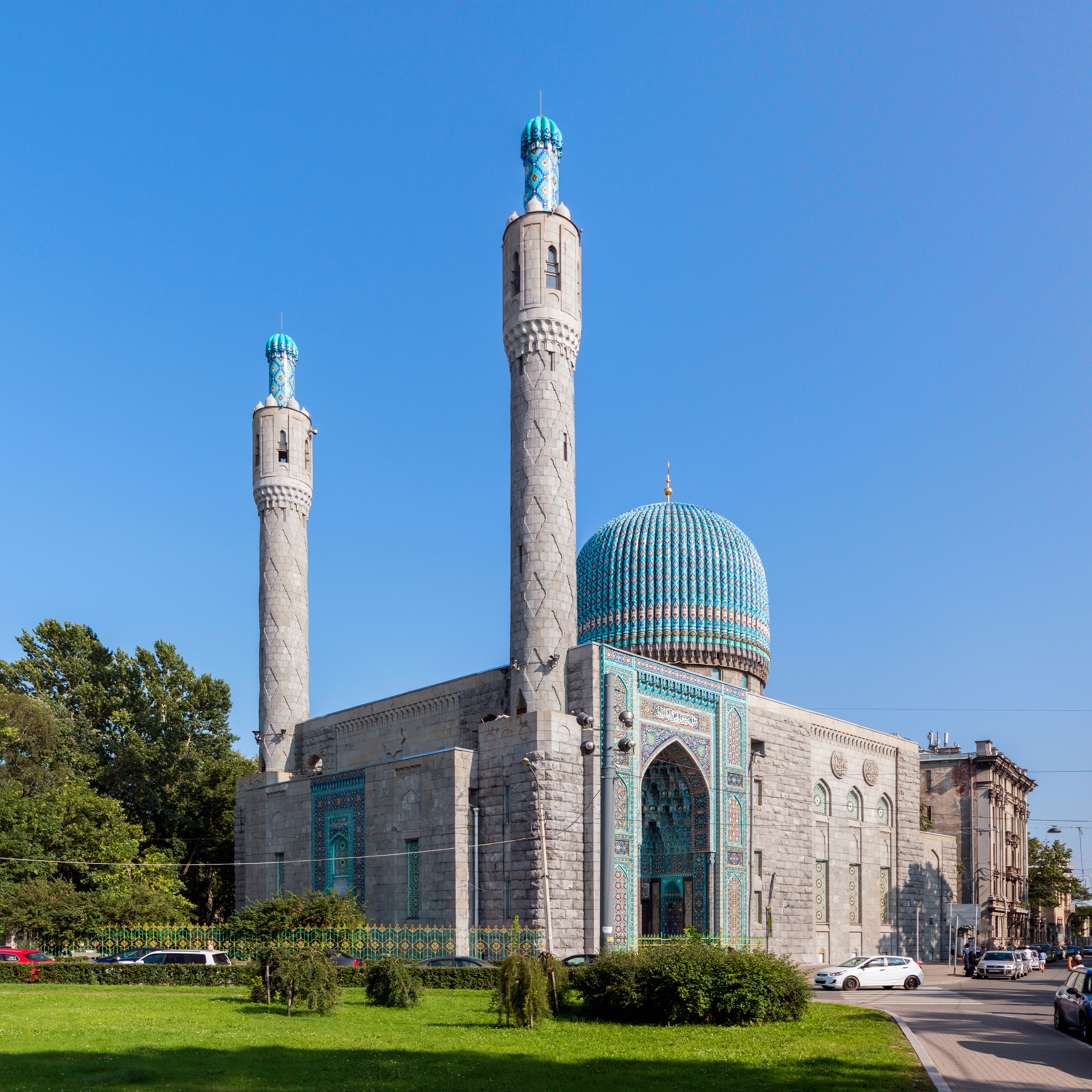
Saint Petersburg Grand Mosque, a 20th-century construction that draws inspiration from the architecture of the Gur-i Amir Mausoleum

Timurid patronage was of high importance in the history of art and architecture across a wide part of the Islamic world. The international Timurid style was eventually integrated into the visual culture of the rising Ottoman Empire in the west, while to the east it was transmitted to the Indian subcontinent by the Mughals, who were descended from Timur. In Iran, the Safavids also inherited the Timurid style and used it to further develop their own imperial architecture.

During the late 14th and 15th centuries, western Iran was dominated by two powerful Turkoman confederations, the Qara Qoyunlu and the Aq Qoyunlu. While few monuments sponsored by either faction have been preserved, what does remain shows that the Timurid style was already spreading westward during this period.
