= Bahrabad =

Bahrabad (Persian: بهراباد) may refer to:

- Bahrabad, Kerman
- Bahrabad, Razavi Khorasan
- Bahrabad, Sistan and Baluchestan
- Barbad, the Persian composer
