= Jameh Mosque of Nishapur =

Mosque in Nishapur, Razavi Khorasan, Iran

Jāmeh Mosque of Nishapur
- مسجد جامع نیشابور
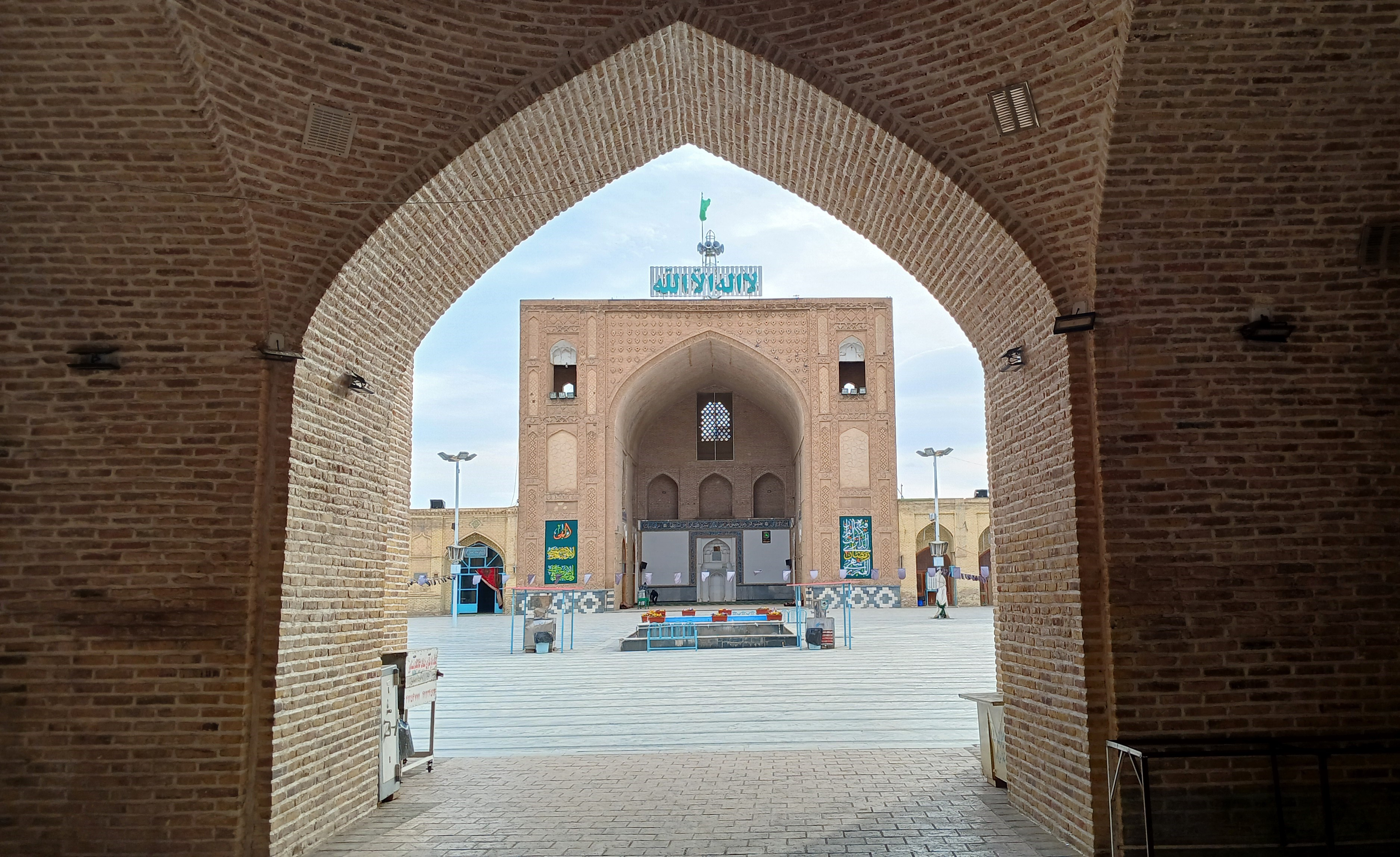
- The mosque iwan

- Location of the mosque in Iran

Religion
- Affiliation: Shia Islam
- Ecclesiastical or organisational status: Friday mosque
- Status: Active

Location
- Location: Nishapur, Nishapur County, Razavi Khorasan Province
- Country: Iran
- Coordinates: 36°12′07″N 58°47′46″E

Architecture
- Type: Mosque architecture
- Style: Timurid
- Founder: Pahlavan Ali Karkhi
- Completed: 1493 CE
- Materials: Bricks; mortar; tiles

Iran National Heritage List
- Official name: Friday Mosque of Nishapur
- Type: Friday Mosque
- Designated: 1938
- Reference no.: 317
- Conservation organization: Cultural Heritage, Handicrafts and Tourism Organization of Iran

The Jāmeh Mosque of Nishapur (Persian: مسجد جامع نیشابور, romanized: Masjed-e-Jāmeh Neyshābur) is a Shi'ite Friday mosque (jāmeh) located in Nishapur, in the province of Razavi Khorasan, Iran.

The mosque was founded by Pahlavan Ali Karkhi in 1493 CE during the rule of Husayn Bayqarah of the Timurid dynasty, and was rebuilt during the reign of Abbas the Great, the Safavid Shah of Persia. The mosque was added to the Iran National Heritage List on 12 November 1938, administered by the Cultural Heritage, Handicrafts and Tourism Organization of Iran.

== Gallery ==
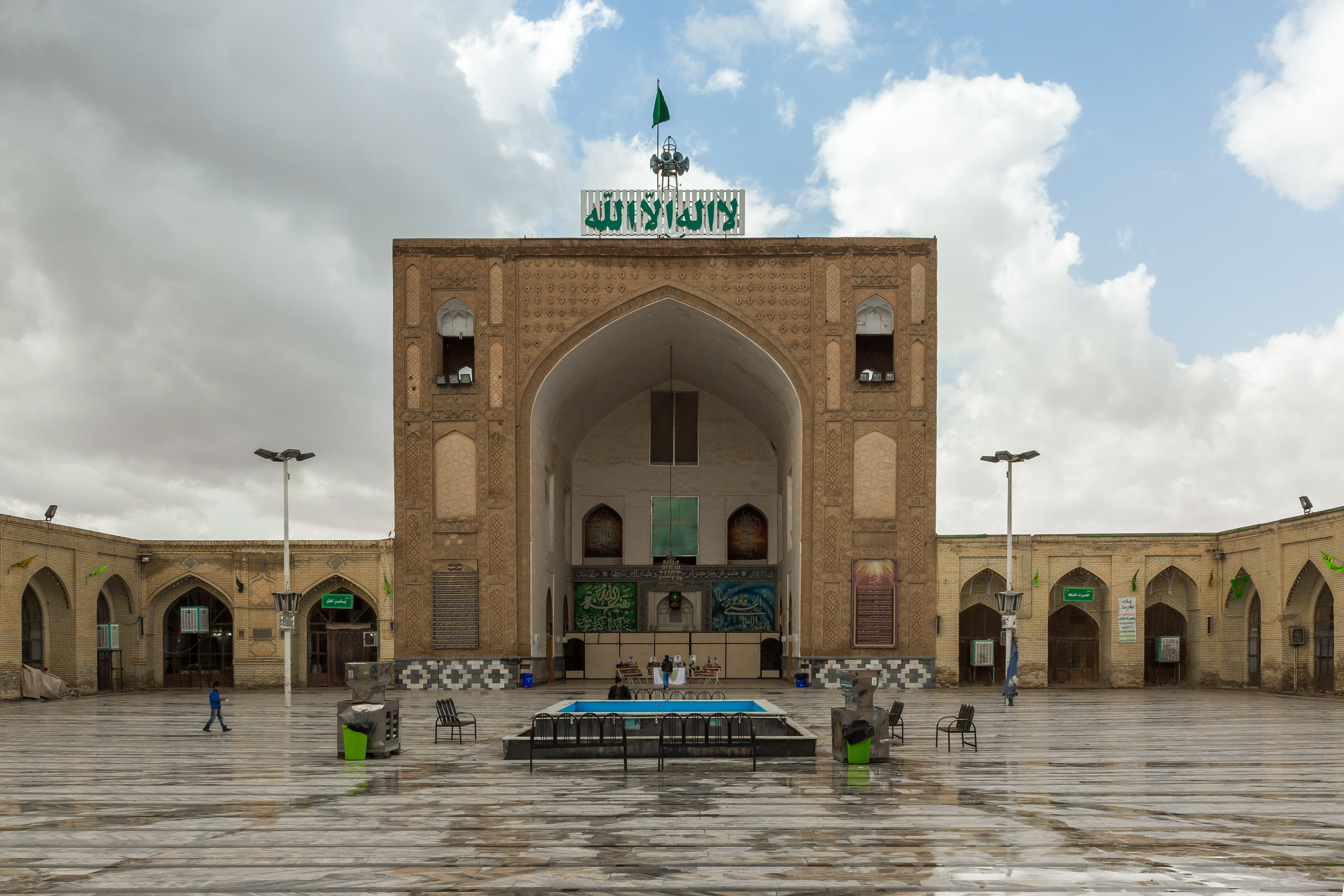

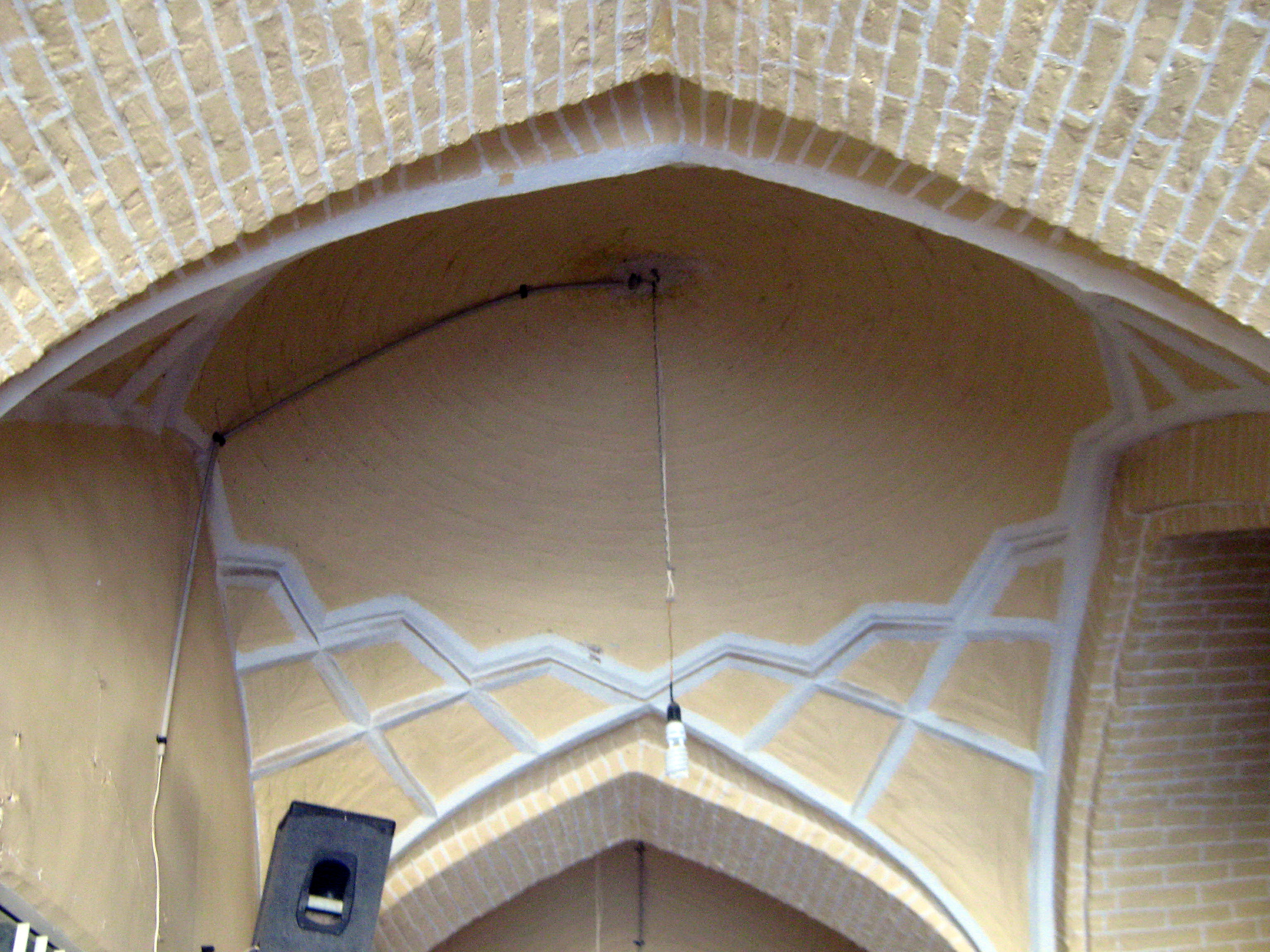

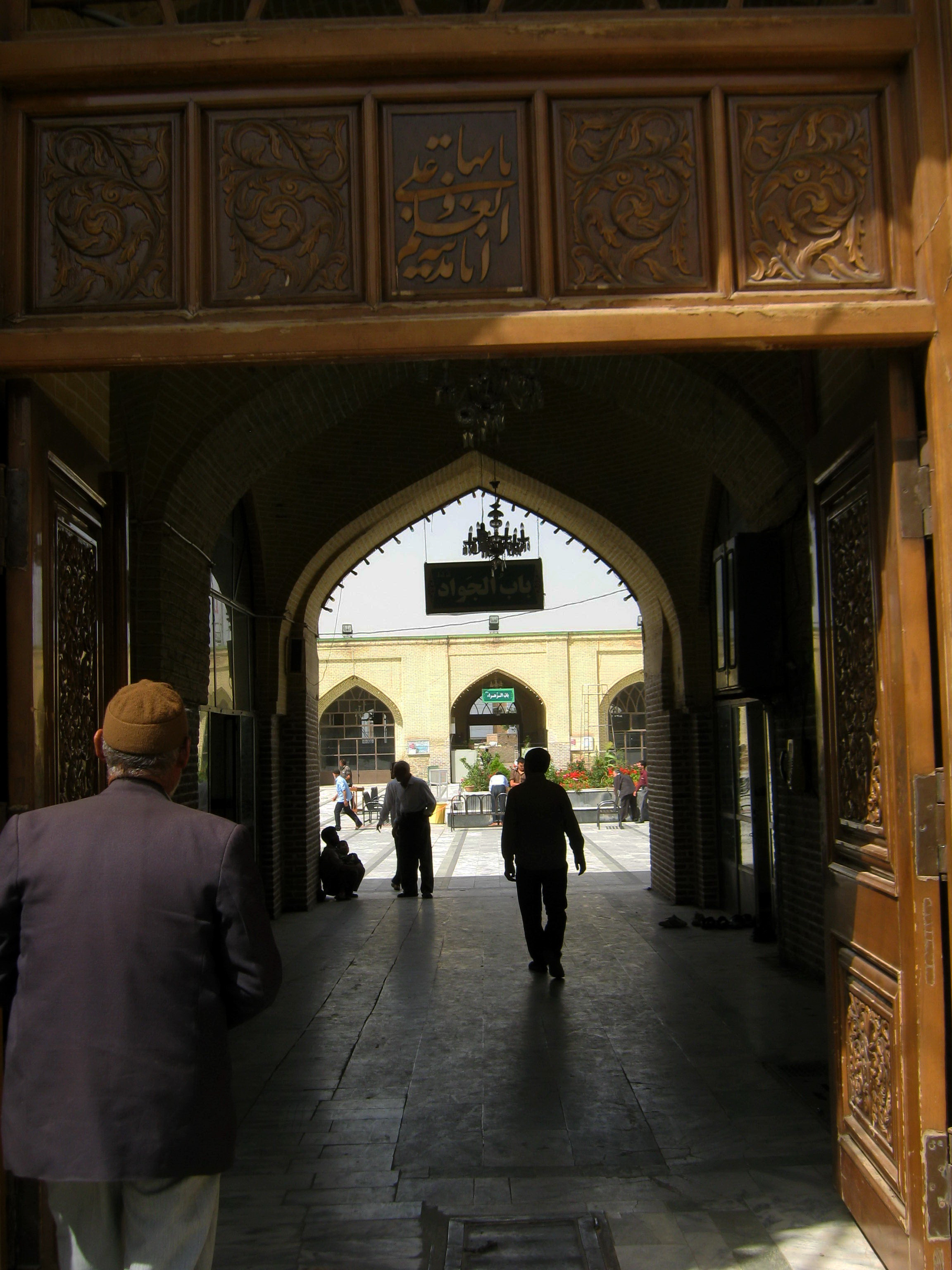

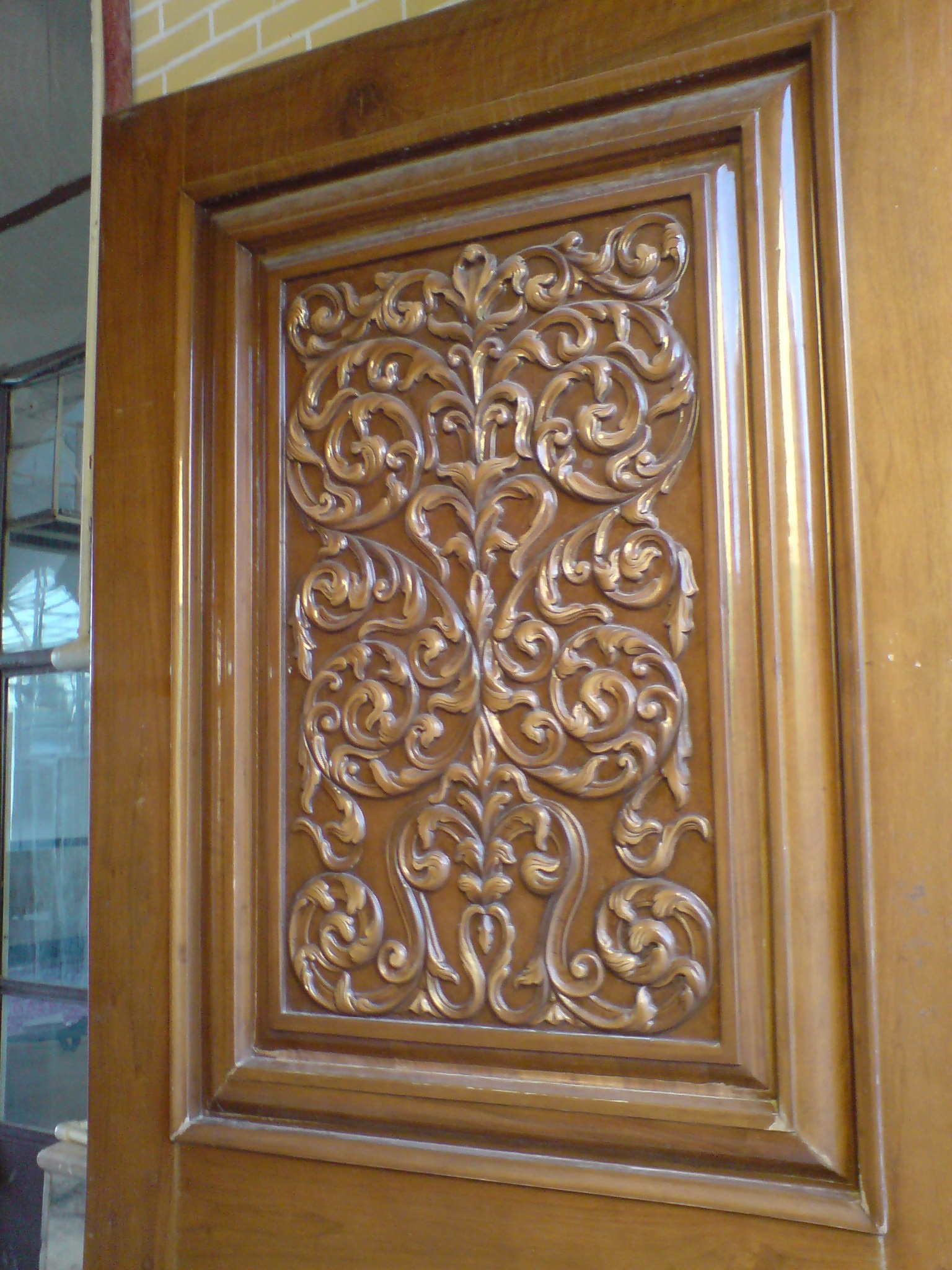

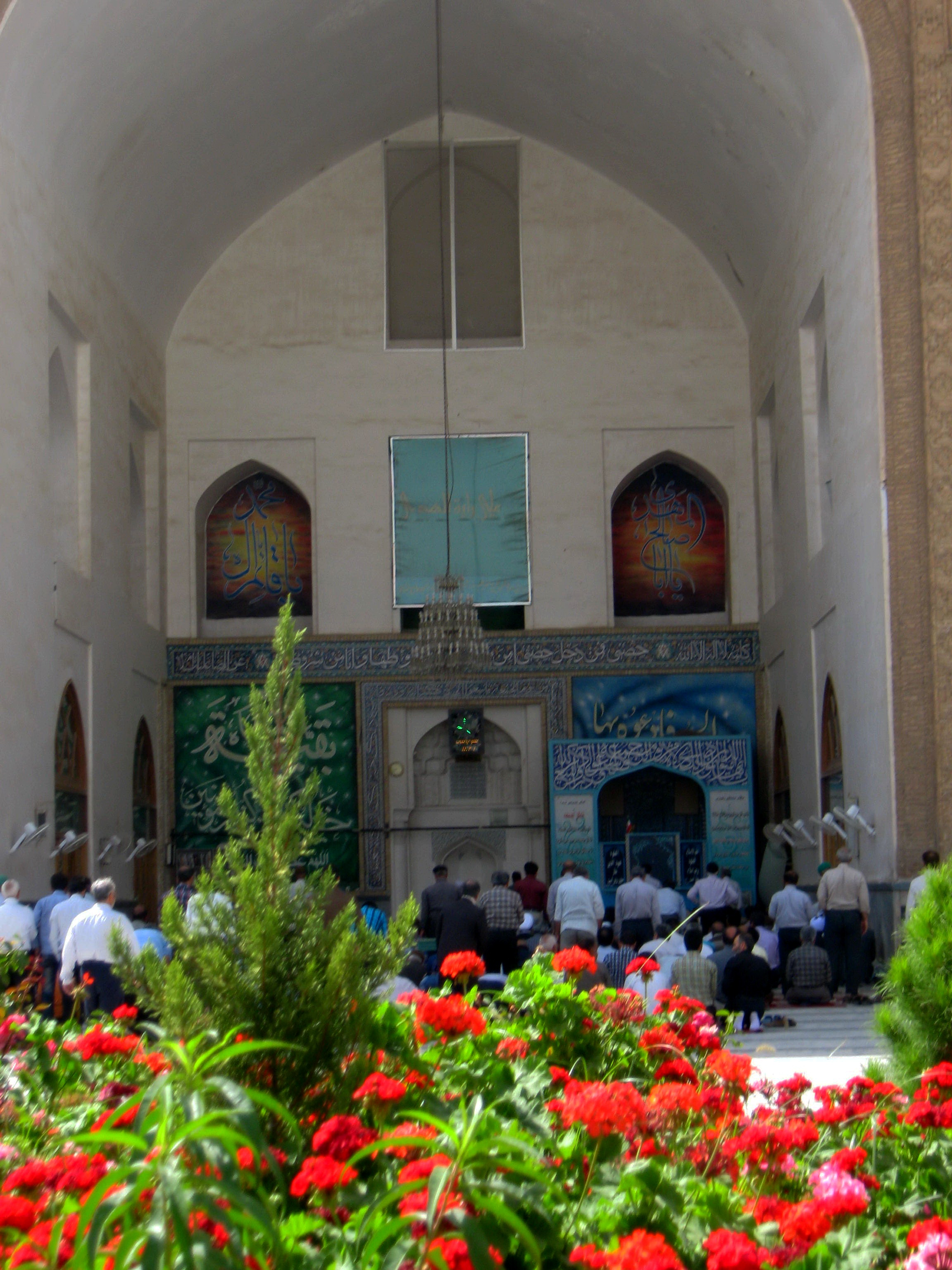

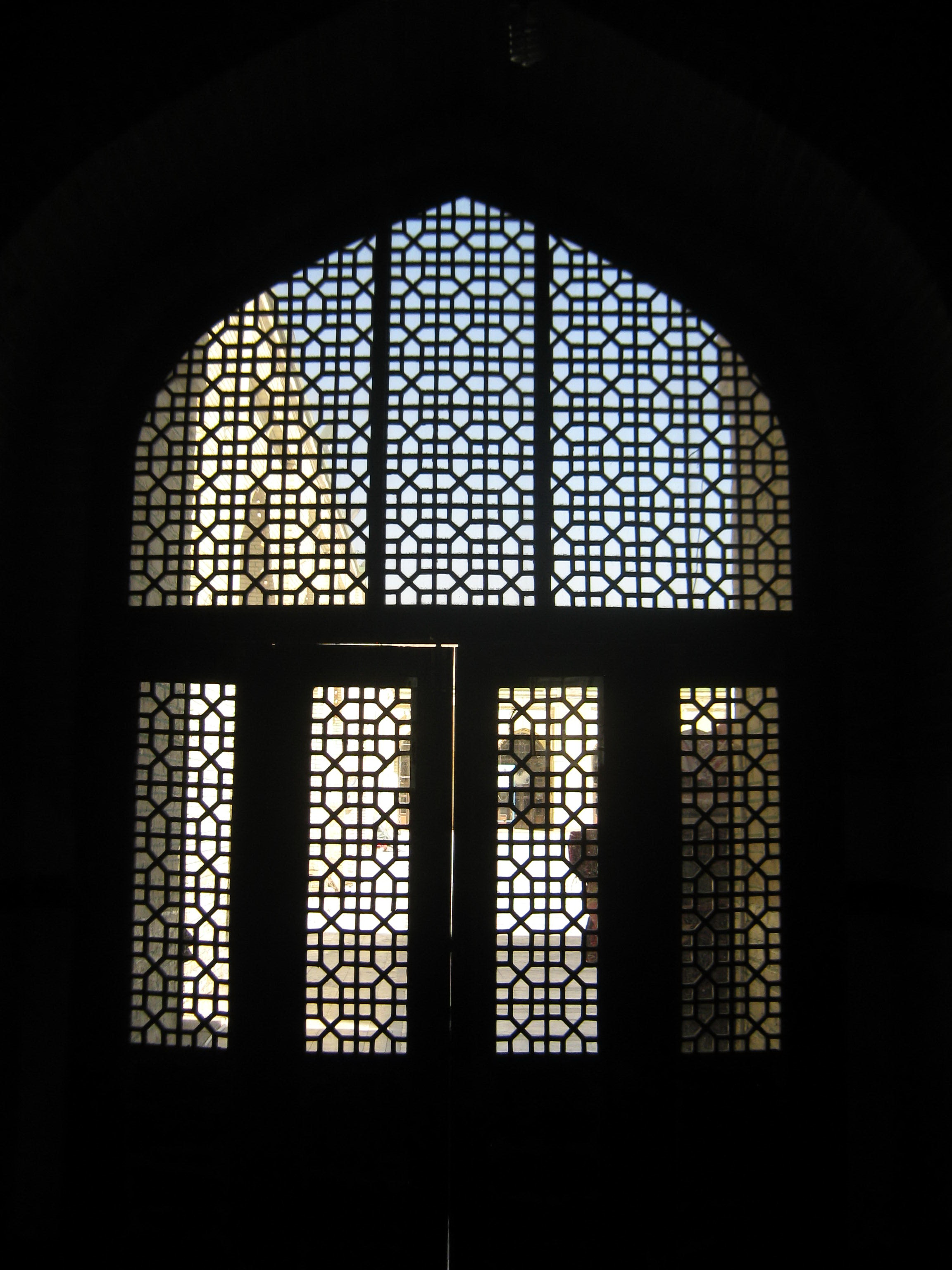

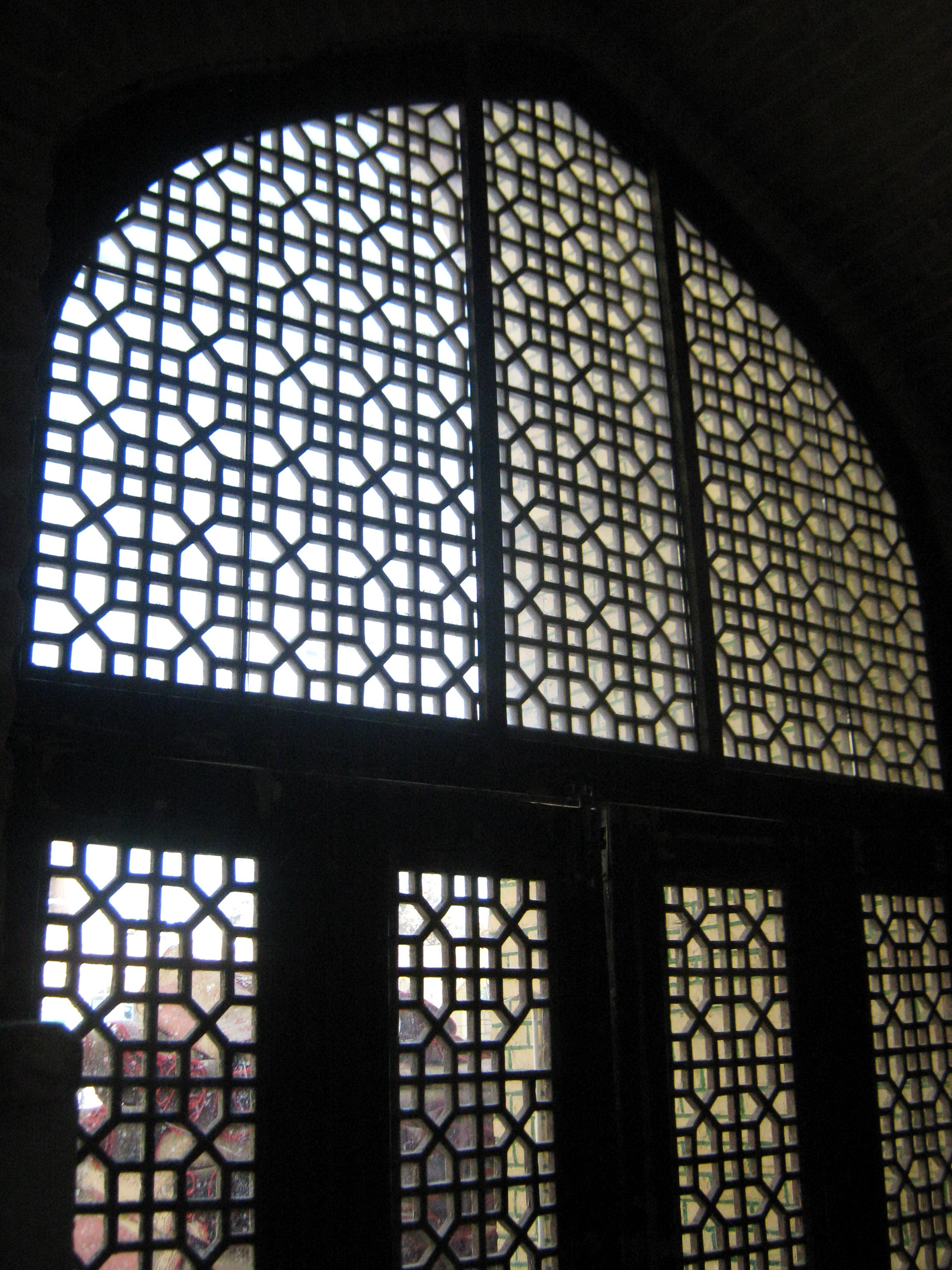

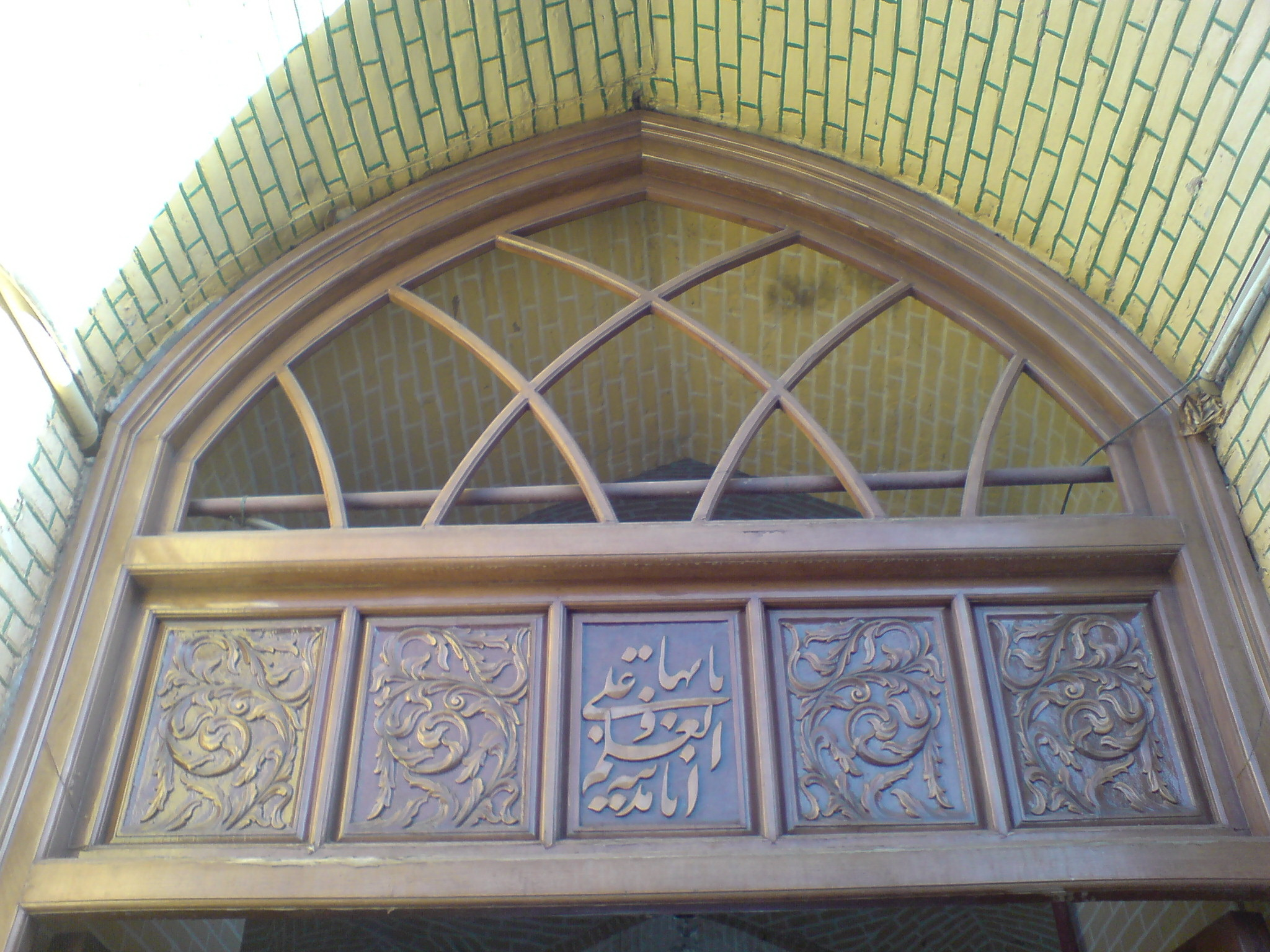

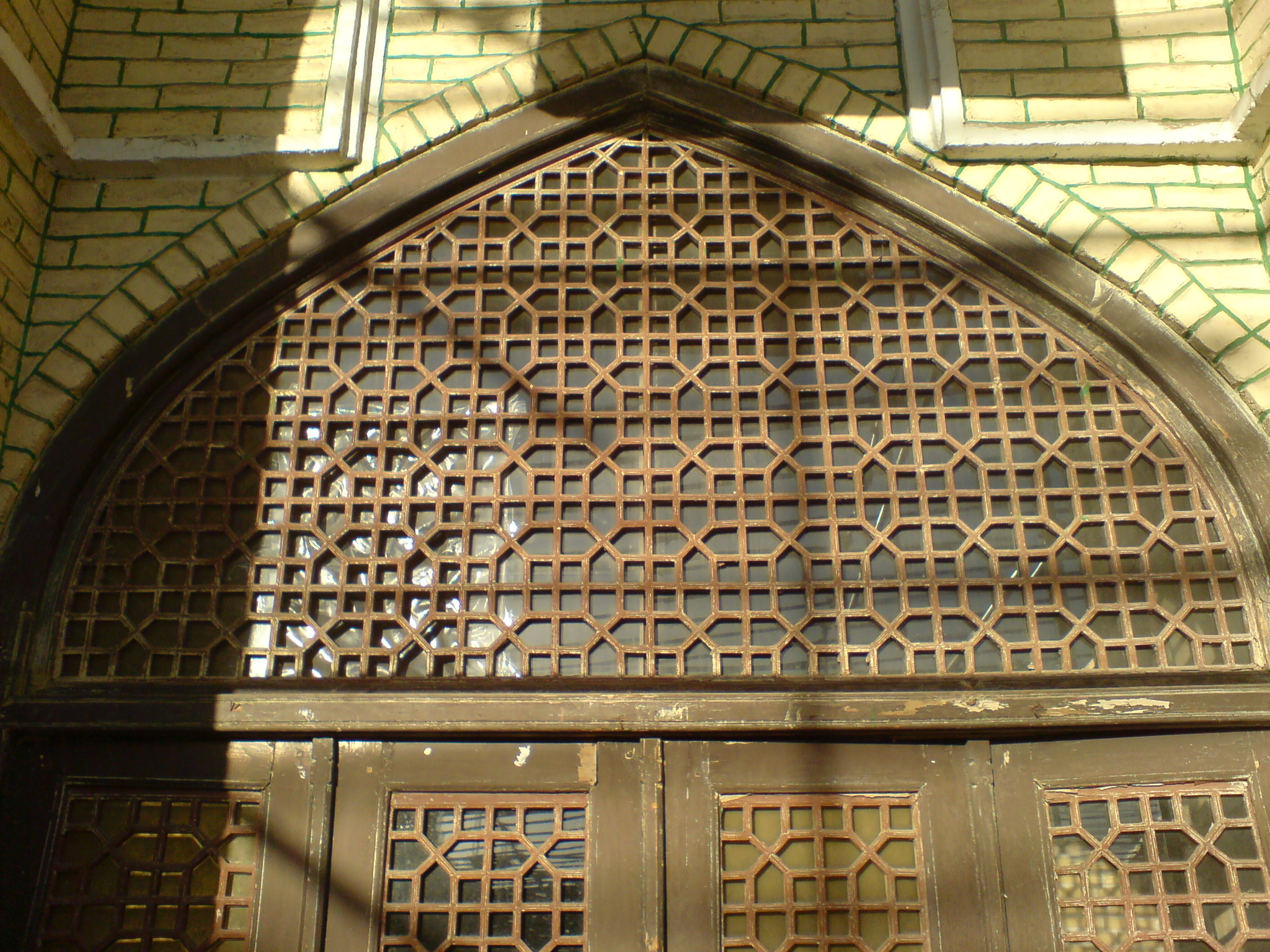

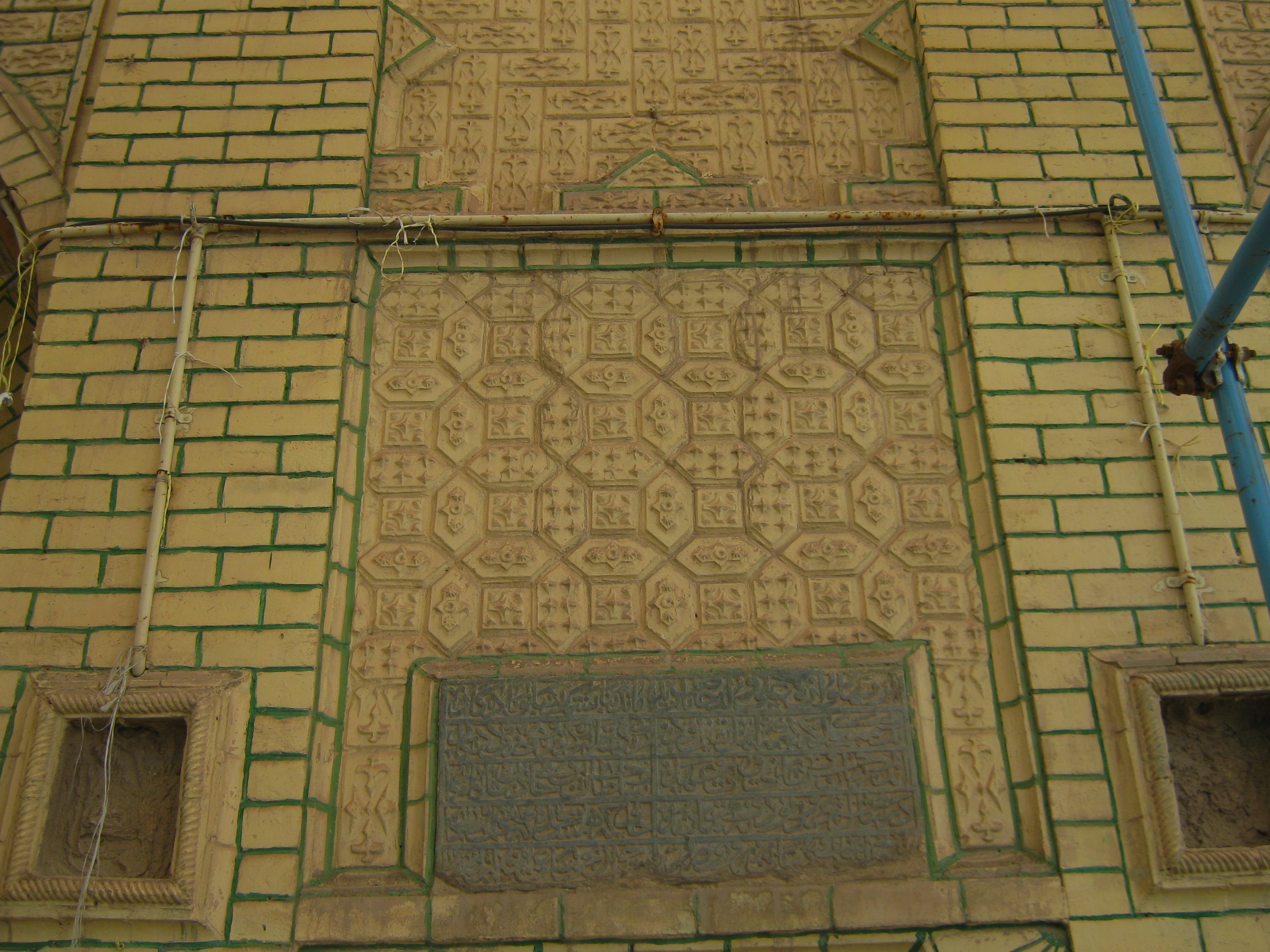

== See also ==
- Shia Islam in Iran
- List of mosques in Iran
