= Sa'd al-Din al-Hamawi =

Saʿd al-Dīn Muḥammad ibn al-Muʾayyad ibn Ḥamuwayh al-Ḥamuwayī al-Juwaynī (Note: There is much confusion over the spelling of Saʿd al-Dīn's family name. This especially concerns the vocalization, since traditional written Arabic does not indicate most vowels. The Arabic sources give various spellings for the name: ḥmwya, al-ḥmwwyh, al-ḥmwwʾy, al-ḥmwyy and, especially in later sources, al-ḥmwi. The form ḥmwya, which appears after ibn ("son of"), may be rendered Ḥamūya, Ḥamawiyya or Ḥamuwiyya. Other spellings include Ḥammūya and Ḥamawayh. The nisba form al-ḥmwyy may be rendered al-Ḥamūyaī or al-Ḥamūyiyī, while al-ḥmwi gives al-Ḥamawī. Other spellings include al-Ḥammūʾī and al-Ḥamūʾī. The most likely spelling of the name is Ḥamuwayh and for the nisba forms al-Ḥamuwayī, al-Ḥamuwwayī and al-Ḥamuwwaīʾī, with the first of these being most likely. A copy of the ijāza (teaching licence) issued by Najm al-Dīn Kubrā to Saʿd al-Dīn in April or May 1214 gives his name as Muḥammad ibn al-Muʾayyad ibn Abī Bakr al-Ḥmwwyy. A copy of a letter sent to Saʿd al-Dīn by a fellow pupil of Kubrā, Sayf al-Dīn Bākharzī, on 22 February 1220 gives his name as Saʿd al-Milla wa ʾl-Dīn Muḥammad ibn al-Muʾayyad ibn Abī Bakr al-Ḥusayn ibn Muḥammad ibn Ḥamwyh al-Ḥmwyy. The interpretation of the name has also provoked confusion. An early biographer, ʿAbd al-Raḥmān al-Isnawī, interpreted the name as referring to Hama in Syria, but no members of the family are known to have lived there. The family originated in Juwayn (Joveyn) in Persia. It is more likely that Ḥamuwayh was the personal name of an ancestor. The earliest known member of the family was Muḥammad, son of Ḥamuwayh, who died in Juwayn in 1135 or 1136. Ḥamuwayh may in turn be a Persianized diminutive form of Aḥmad or Muḥammad.) (1190/99 – 1252/60) (Note: The primary sources give contradictory dates for Saʿd al-Dīn's birth and death. According to Faṣīḥ Khwāfī, he was born on 23rd day of the month of Dhu ʾl-Ḥijja in AH 585, which would correspond to 1 February 1190. The family mashyakha (spiritual lineage chart), composed by his great-grandson Ghiyāth al-Dīn, agrees with the day but places it in the year 586, which corresponds to 21 January 1191. Both sources place his death on 18 Dhu ʾl-Ḥijja 649, which is 3 March 1252. A marginal notice in a 14th-century manuscript (Garrett Collection, Mach 2753) gives his dates as 15 Jumādā al-ʾawwal 588 and 12 Dhu ʾl-Ḥijja 649, which are 29 May 1192 and 25 February 1252. An early copy of Saʿd al-Dīn's Kitāb al-maḥbūb (manuscript A1418 Topkapı) contains an ijāza issued by his son, which gives his father's date of death as 10Dhu ʾl-Ḥijja 649 (23 February 1252). According to his contemporary, Sibṭ ibn al-Jawzī, he died in AH 650. The Persian poet Jāmī in his Nafaḥāt al-uns agrees with Ibn al-Jawzī on the year and, drawing from al-Yāfiʿī, specifies the day as 10 Dhu ʾl-Ḥijja, corresponding to 11 February 1253. He makes his age at death 63, which puts his birth in 587 (1191). The Tārīkh-i guzīda agrees with the day 10 Dhu ʾl-Ḥijja, but puts it in the year 658, which corresponds to 16 November 1260, which puts his birth as late as 595 (1198/99).) was a Persian Ṣūfī shaykh from a prominent Ṣūfī family. He belonged to the order of the Kubrāwiyya. A prolific writer, he is credited with at least 47 works plus poetry. He was a noted mystic and much of his writing is esoteric and numerological.

Born and died in Khorasan, he studied in Damascus, went on a pilgrimage to Mecca and lived for a time in Tabrīz and Mosul. He fled the Mongol invasion of Khwārazm in 1220. By 1242 he had contracted an illness that resulted in the loss of a finger.

== Life ==
Saʿd al-Dīn was born in Baḥrābād. His full name was Muḥammad ibn al-Muʾayyad ibn Abī Bakr ibn Abu ʾl-Ḥasan ibn Muḥammad ibn Ḥamuwayh. A fuller name, complete with honorifics is given in the mashyakha: Saʿd al-Dīn Abu ʾl-Saʿādāt Muḥammad ibn Muʿīn al-Dīn Muʾayyad ibn Jamāl al-Dīn Abū Bakr ʿAbd Allāh Ḥasan ibn ʿAlī ibn Abū ʿAbd Allāh Muḥammad ibn Ḥamuwayh. Saʿd al-Dīn's brother Muʿīn al-Dīn ʿUmar was also a Ṣūfī. He should not be confused with his like-named second cousin, Saʿd al-Dīn ibn Tāj al-Dīn. His family is known as the Awlād al-Shaykh (Banū Ḥamawiya).

In his youth, Saʿd al-Dīn studied at Jabal Qāsiyūn outside Damascus under his father's paternal cousin, Ṣadr al-Dīn Abu ʾl-Ḥasan Muḥammad al-Ḥamuwayī. The source do not agree on what he studied. Jāmī believed it was mysticism, but al-Dhahabī calls Ṣadr al-Dīn a Shāfiʿī jurist.

It is not known when Saʿd al-Dīn became a disciple of Najm al-Dīn Kubrā, but it was before the Mongol invasion of Khwārazm in 1220. He had already completed his ḥajj (pilgrimage) at the time. At the approach of the Mongols, Kubrā ordered all his students to return to their homes. Saʿd al-Dīn's ijāza was issued around this time. Saʿd al-Dīn appears to have returned to his uncle (then in Mosul) shortly before the latter's death in 1220. He eventually returned to Jabal Qāsiyūn, where he taught Ṣadr al-Dīn al-Qūnawī, who relayed Saʿd al-Dīn's works to his step-father Ibn al-ʿArabī, who is said to have admired them.

How long Saʿd al-Dīn remained in Jabal Qāsiyūn is unknown, but he eventually moved back to Baḥrābād, where he resided in his family's khānqāh (Ṣūfī school). He made a short trip to Gūrpān to visit with Aḥmad al-Jūrfānī, a student of Rāzī al-Dīn ʿAlī Lālā, a student of Kubrā. He spent nine months in Tabrīz in 1242–1243. According to Ibn al-Karbalāʾī, shortly before his arrival in Tabrīz, he developed a disease which caused him to lose a finger. Possibly this was leprosy. His followers in Tabrīz buried his finger in a local cemetery. According to a legend associated with this stay says that he saw the young Najm al-Dīn Zarkub Tabrīzī playing with other children in the street, placed his hand on his head and predicted his future greatness. Saʿd al-Dīn's son Ṣadr al-Dīn Ibrāhīm was born in Amol in Tabaristan in 644 (1247).

Jāmī records two anecdotes of Saʿd al-Dīn entering into trances. In one, after sitting with his eyes closed for a long time, he called Ṣadr al-Dīn al-Qūnawī to him, opened his eyes and told him, "I wished that the first face my eyes looked upon after they had been honored by a vision of [the Prophet's] beauty should be yours." In the other, he spirit left his body and he lay still for thirteen days. People believed he had died, and when he came to he was unaware how long he had been gone. Ibn al-Karbalāʾī in his Rawḍāt al-jinān (1567) records instances of Saʿd al-Dīn predicting the future.

Saʿd al-Dīn died in Khorasan. The cause of his death is unknown; possibly it was related to the disease he had contracted almost two decades earlier.

== Works ==
Saʿd al-Dīn wrote in both Arabic and Persian. There are at least 29 extant prose works attributed to him, plus another 18 attributed that are possibly lost. His prose works range from short treatises to lengthy books. He also wrote poetry. His works can be roughly divided between those that are esoteric, which often contain ʿilm al-ḥurūf (letter and number mysticism), and those that are exhortative in a typically Kubrawī style. The latter include commentaries on the Qurʾān and the Ḥadīth.

There are 23 titled works that survive in manuscript copies. There are six further works that survive in copies but untitled. There are 18 works cited by title, but not known to survive. They include a work on the New Testament.

Works in Persian

- Questions and Answers
- On the Particulars of Sūra Yāsīn
- On the Complete Actualization of Prayer
- On the Science of Letters and Symbol
- The Subtleties of Unity in the Wonders of Solitary Devotion
- Treatise of the Lamp
- Commentary on the Tradition "I Was a Hidden Treasure"
- Commentary on Ten Traditions
- On Mystical Explanations
- On the Recollection of Gabriel
- Commentary on the Basmala

Works in Arabic

- The Ocean of Meanings
- On the Removal of the Curtain and Lifting of the Veil
- Book of the Beloved
- Book of the Point
- Mirror of the Spirits and Signs on the Tablets
- On Mystical Journeying and Flight
- On the Science of Absolute Realities
- On the Appearance of the Seal of Saints
- The Seven Paths
- Keys to the Secrets
- The Nature of Letters and Symbols
- On the Meaning of the Letters of the Alphabet

Lost works

- The Cause of Separation of the Exile
- The Book of the Eye and Vision
- Treatise on the Knot and Untying
- On the Reality of Time and Hour
- On the Letter of the Ascension
- On the Equanimity of the Compassionate
- Words from the New Testament
- The Stages of Burning
- The Revelatory Encounter
- The Trigonometry of the King and Kingdom
- The Covering of Letters and Words
- Exploration of the Meaning of Unveiling
- The Purification of the Prophet, Upon Him be Peace
- The Book of Support and Victory
- Manufactured Traditions in the Collected Recension
- Heart of the Hereafter
- The Vessel of the Virtuous on the Sea of Secrets
- Peace for the Pious in Comprehending the Conditions of Certitude

== Bibliography ==
- Elias, Jamal J. (1994). "The Sufi Lords of Bahrabad: Saʾd al-Din and Sadr al-Din Hamuwayi". Iranian Studies. 27 (1–4): 53–75. doi:10.1080/00210869408701820.
- Hofer, Nathan (2014). "The Origins and Development of the Office of the 'Chief Sufi' in Egypt, 1173–1325". Journal of Sufi Studies. 3 (1): 1–37. doi:10.1163/22105956-12341260.
- Landolt, Hermann (1997). "Saʿd al-Dīn al-Ḥammūʾī". In Bosworth, C. E.; van Donzel, E.; Heinrichs, W. P. & Lecomte, G. (eds.). The Encyclopaedia of Islam, Second Edition. Volume IX: San–Sze. Leiden: E. J. Brill. pp. 703–704. ISBN 978-90-04-10422-8.
- Köprülü Zāde Fuʾād (1934). "Saʿd al-Dīn al-Ḥamawī". In M. Th. Houtsma; A. J. Wensinck; H. A. R. Gibb; W. Heffening; É. Lévi-Provençal (eds.). The Encyclopaedia of Islam, Volume IV: S–Z. Leiden: E. J. Brill. pp. 31–32. ISBN 978-90-04-08265-6.
- Uy II, Cyril Villarosa (2025). Lost in a Sea of Letters: Saʿd al-Dīn Ḥamūya and the Plurality of Sufi Knowledge. Leiden: Brill. ISBN 978-90-04-72506-5.
