= Ghiyath al-Din Pir Ahmad Khvafi =

Timurid vizier (died 1453)

Ghiyath al-Din Pir Ahmad Khvafi was a Persian statesman who was the vizier of the Timurid ruler Shah Rukh (r. 1405–1447) from 1417 to 1447. He played a key role in reforming the Timurid bureaucratic administration. After his vizierate ended, he worked under several Timurid princes, including Abdal-Latif Mirza, Ala al-Dawla Mirza, Sultan-Muhammad and Abul-Qasim Babur Mirza. He died in 1453.

He was survived by his son, Majd al-Din Muhammad Khvafi, who was also vizier.

== Sources ==
- Manz, Beatrice Forbes (2007). Power, Politics and Religion in Timurid Iran. Cambridge University Press. ISBN 978-1-139-46284-6.
- Subtelny, Maria (2007). Timurids in Transition: Turko-Persian Politics and Acculturation in Medieval Iran. Brill. ISBN 978-90-04-16031-6.
