= Bahrabad, Razavi Khorasan =

Bahrabad بهراباد
- Village
- Location within Iran
- Coordinates: 36.751149202060034°N 57.263295598075835°E
- Country: Iran
- Province: Razavi Khorasan
- County: Joveyn
- Time zone: UTC+3:30 (IRST)
  - Summer (DST): UTC+4:30 (IRDT)

Bahrabad (Persian: بهراباد, also Romanized as Baḥrābād or Bahr Abad) is a village in Joveyn County, Razavi Khorasan Province, Iran.

Bahrabad was the hometown of the Awlad al-Shaykh, a prominent Sufi family who dominated the khanqah there in the 12th and 13th centuries. Saʿd al-Dīn al-Ḥamuwayī was born there in the 1190s. The place is mentioned in passing by Fasih Khwafi and Dawlatshah Samarqandi. According to Hamdallah Mustawfi, it lay fifteen parsakhs, from Jajarm and twenty-three from Nishapur.
