= Fasih Khwafi =

Fasih Ahmad ibn Jalal al-Din Muhammad Khwafi (died 1442) was a Persian bureaucrat and historian of the Timurid court. His major work was Mujmal i-Fasihi.

His lineage is obscure; his father's family was from Bakharz, and claimed descent from the Islamic prophet Muhammad; his mother was a native of Khwaf in the Khorasan region of eastern Iran. She was the granddaughter of the warlord Khvaja Majd, who ruled in Khwaf in the early 14th-century. Moreover, her family also claimed descent from the Ghaznavid vizier Abu Nasr Mushkan. It was seemingly because of her illustrious descent that Fasih assumed the nisba of Khwafi (meaning "from Khwaf"). Despite his nisba, however, Fasih was from his father's birthplace of Bakharz, as reported by Uqayli. He was related to the bureaucrat Khvaja Qivam al-Din Nizam al-Mulk Khvafi.

== Sources ==
- Manz, Beatrice Forbes (2007). Power, Politics and Religion in Timurid Iran. Cambridge University Press. ISBN 978-1-139-46284-6.
