= Ak-Saray Palace =

Historical site in Shahrisabz

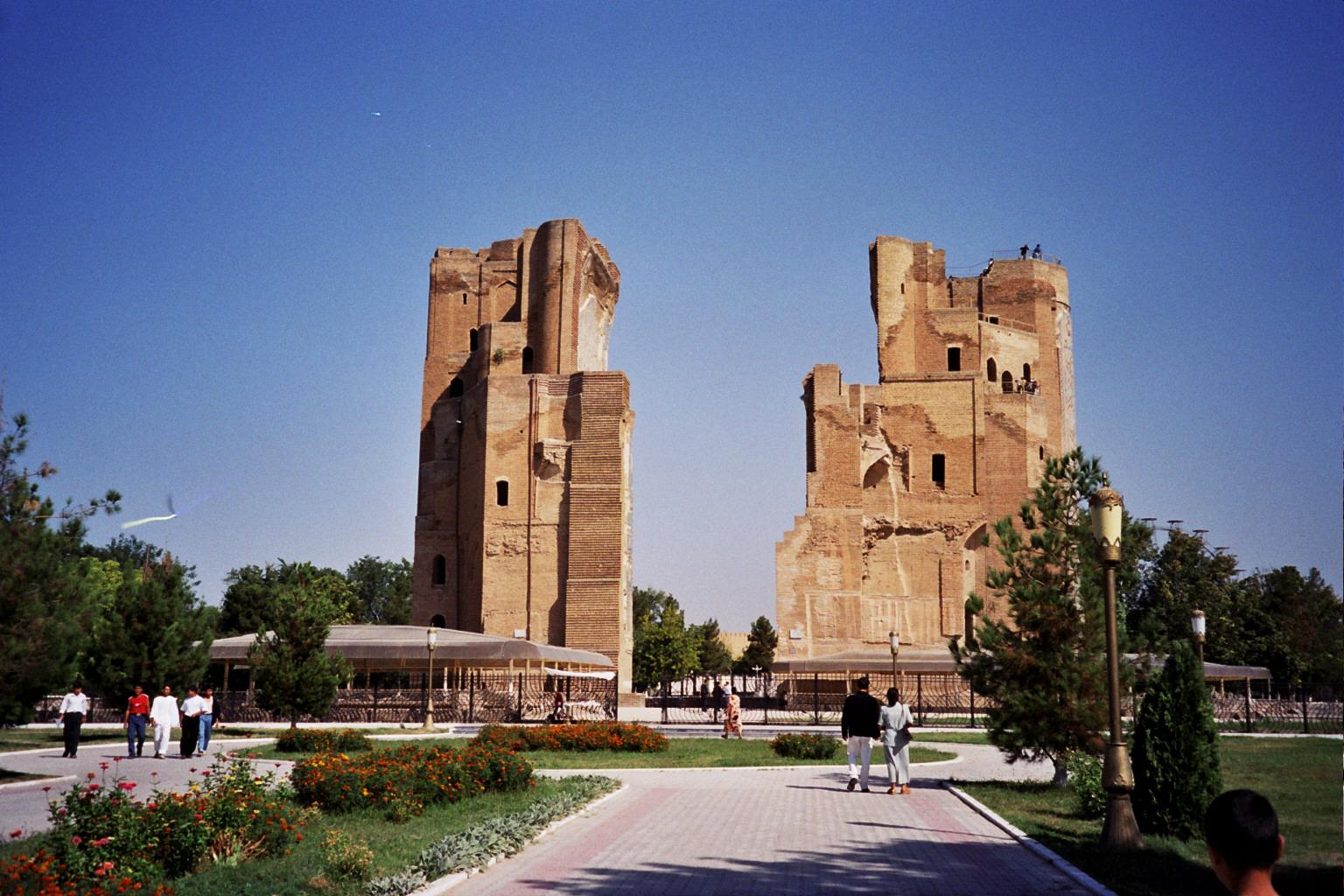

- Location within Uzbekistan

General information
- Architectural style: Architecture
- Location: Shahrisabz, Uzbekistan
- Coordinates: 39°03′39″N 66°49′45″E
- Construction started: 1380
- Completed: 1404

Ak-Saray Palace is a ruined palace and historic site in Shahrisabz, Uzbekistan. The palace was built at the beginning of the Timurid period, between 1380 and 1404, under the reign of Timur. In 2000, the palace was declared a UNESCO World Heritage Site.

== History ==
Timur was born near Shahrisabz, which was known as Kesh during that period, and wanted to make the city the capital of his empire instead of Samarkand. So he had a mighty palace built here. Construction of the castle began in 1380 and lasted 24 years until 1404, just before Timur's death.

In the 16th century, Shahrisabz along with Ak-Saray Castle were destroyed by the forces of Abdullah Khan II, the Khan of Bukhara. After Uzbekistan gained independence, conservation works were carried out between 1994 and 1998. A colossal statue of Timur was erected on a high pedestal on the original site of the palace.

== Architecture ==
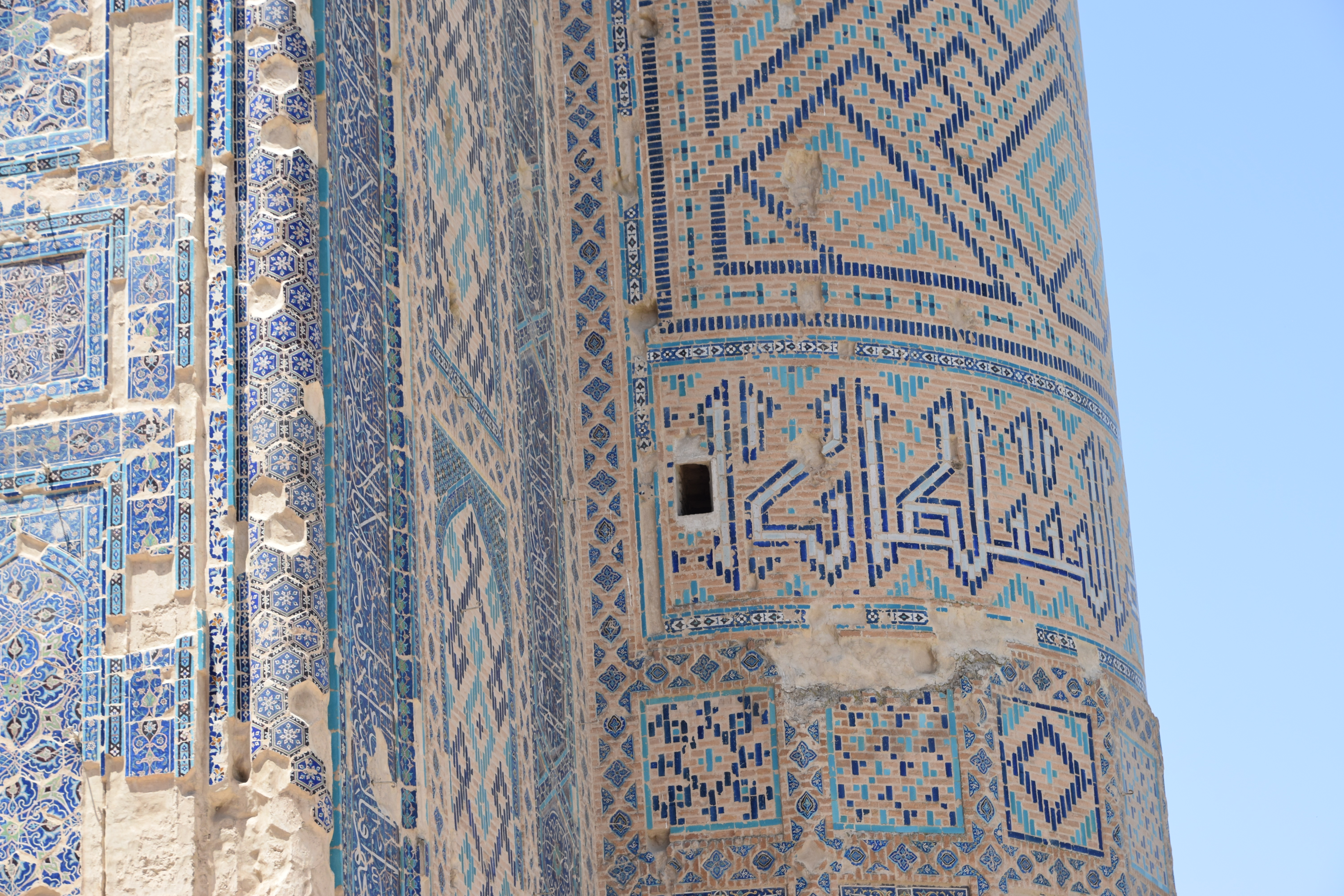
Mosaic tiles in Ak-Saray Palace

The remains Ak-Saray Palace lie to the north of the historic center of Shahrisabz in a park near the north gate in the city walls. Above all, the remains of the 38 m (125 ft) high pylons of the former portal, whose vault had a span of 22 m (72 ft), have been preserved. The facade is decorated with large patterns of ocher and dark blue and light blue glazed bricks. A scroll bears the inscription "God prolong the Sultan's days." The arcaded main courtyard of the palace with a water basin was 120–125 m (394–410 ft) wide and 240–250 m (790–820 ft) long. It was surrounded by buildings, one of which is said to have been six stories high. The number and size of other farms could not be determined due to destruction in the 16th century.

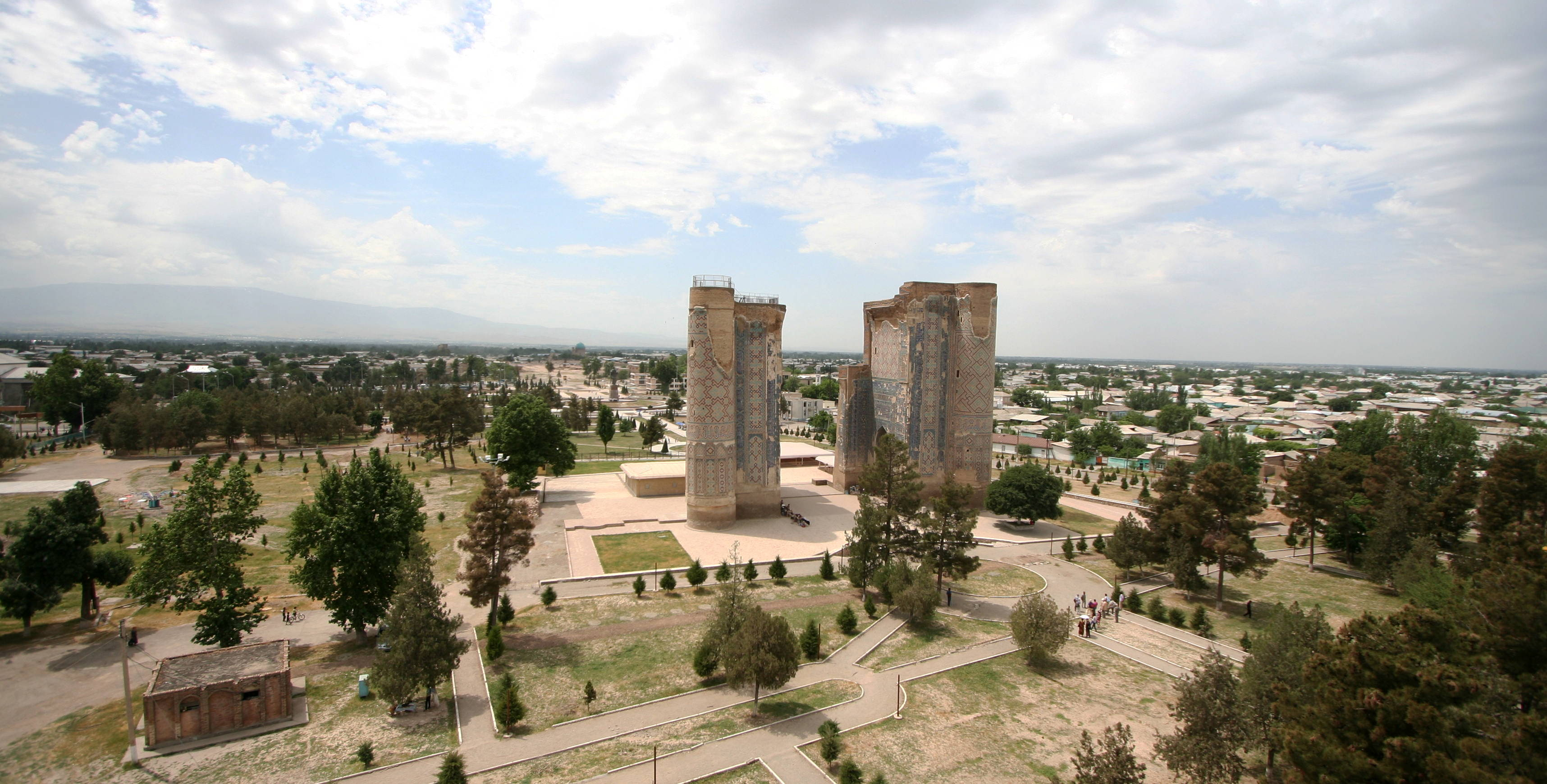
Aerial view of Ak-Saray Palace in 2014
