= Beatrice Forbes Manz =

American historian

Beatrice Forbes Manz is an American historian of the Middle East and Central Asia who specializes in nomads and the Timurid dynasty. She currently works as a professor of history at Tufts University. Her 1989 book The Rise and Rule of Tamerlane is considered one of the most authoritative accounts of the career of the conqueror Timur.

She received a bachelor's from Harvard University in 1970 and a master's in Middle Eastern studies from the University of Michigan in 1974, then returned to Harvard for a doctorate in Inner Asian and Altaic studies which she received in 1983. She is a fellow of the Massachusetts Historical Society and, as of 2014, president of the American Institute of Iranian Studies.

She is the child of William H. Forbes and the well-known endocrinologist Anne Pappenheimer Forbes.

Her book publications include:

- The Rise and Rule of Tamerlane (Cambridge University Press, 1989)
- Power Politics and Religion in Timurid Iran (Cambridge University Press, 2007), winner of the Middle East Studies Association's 2007 Houshang Pourshariati Iranian Studies Book Award
- Nomads in the Middle East (Cambridge University Press, 2022)

A selection of her articles include:

- "Tamerlane's Career and its Uses," Journal of World History 13.1 (2002)
- "Temür and the Problem of a Conqueror's Legacy," Journal of the Royal Asiatic Society (April 1998)
- "Nomad and Settled in the Timurid Military," in Reuven Amitai and Michal Biran, eds., Mongols, Turks, and Others: Eurasian Nomads and the Sedentary World (Brill, 2005)

Beatrice Manz speaks English, French, German, Russian, Persian, Turkish, and Arabic.

== See also ==
- John E. Woods
