= Khvandamir =

16th-century Persian historian

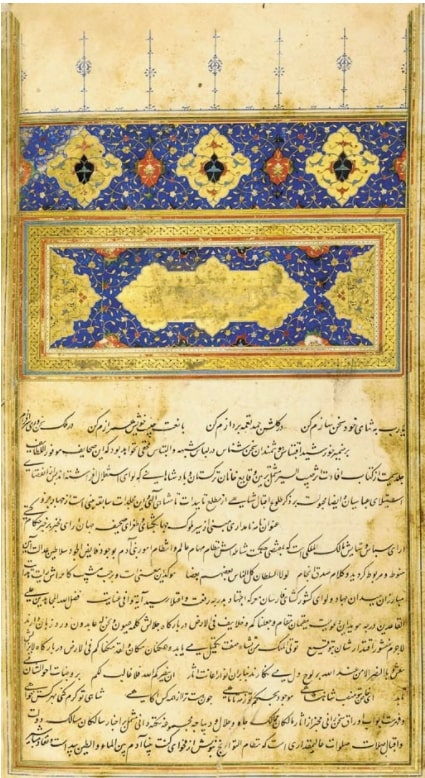
- Manuscript of Khvandamir's Habib al-siyar. Copy made in Safavid Iran, dated 17th-century
- Born: 1475/6 Herat, Khurasan, Timurid Empire
- Died: 1535/6 (aged 59–60) Delhi, Mughal India
- Occupation: Historian
- Notable works: Habib al-siyar Qanun-i Humayuni
- Relatives: Mirkhvand (grandfather); Humam al-Din Muhammad (father); Amir Mahmud (son); Abdallah Khan (son)

Ghiyath al-Din Muhammad, commonly known as Khvandamir (Persian: غیاث‌الدین خواندمیر, also spelled Khwandamir; 1475/76–1535/36) was a Persian historian who was active in the Timurid, Safavid and Mughal empires. He is principally known for his Persian universal history, the Habib al-siyar (The beloved of careers), which was regarded by both the Safavids and Mughals as their first official court account.

Another notable work by Khvandamir is the Qanun-i Humayuni (The regulations of Humayun), a biography of the Mughal emperor Humayun (r. 1530–1540, 1555–1556), which contains important information regarding the early Mughal symbolism of rulership.

Khvandamir is buried near the shrine of Nizamuddin Auliya (died 1325) in Delhi, India.

== Background ==
Khvandamir was the son of Humam al-Din Muhammad, who was the vizier of Sultan Mahmud Mirza (r. 1494–1495), the ruler of the northern Timurid branch in Transoxiana. However, Khvandamir's family lived in Herat, the capital of the southern Timurids. Khvandamir was tutored by his maternal grandfather Mirkhvand (died 1498), which played a major role in his career as a historian. Furthermore, Khvandamir also inherited the patronage networks of his grandfather. Mirkhvand was one of the most prominent historians during the reign of Sultan Husayn Bayqara (r. 1469–1506), well known for his universal history, the Rawzat as-safa' (The garden of purity), which he wrote under the patronage of the high-ranking functionary Ali-Shir Nava'i (died 1501).

Khvandamir likewise wrote under the patronage of Nava'i, dedicating his first works to him, the first one being the Ma'athir al-muluk (Memorials of the kings), a compilation of sayings ascribed to pre-Islamic and Islamic sages and rulers; and the second being the Khulasat al-akhbar fi bayan ahval al-akhyar (Summary reports on the affairs of those gone by), a concise version of the Rawzat as-safa'. After Nava'i's death in 1501, Khvandamir wrote a praiseful biography of the latter, the Makarim al-akhlaq (Laudable virtues). Khvandamir also completed volume seven and epilogue of the Rawzat as-safa', which had been left incomplete after Mirkhvand's death in 1498.

== Career ==
=== Under the Timurids ===
In the subsequent years, Khvandamir worked as a munshi (secretary) and diplomat under Sultan Husayn Bayqara's oldest son and heir Badi' al-Zaman Mirza (died 1514), under whom he composed the Dastur al-vuzara' (Exemplary viziers), a biography list of pre-Islamic and Islamic viziers. Following the co-succession of Badi al-Zaman and his brother Muzaffar Husayn to the throne in 1506, Khvandamir was installed as one of the two sadrs (head of religious fundings) of the entire kingdom. Khvandamir retained his position following conquest of Herat by the Uzbek leader Muhammad Shaybani (died 1510), which led to the fall of the Timurids. Regardless, Khvandamir seems to have been dissatisfied with the new government, as indicated in his later universal history Habib al-siyar. He soon found himself unemployed following the conquest of Herat by the Safavid shah (king) Ismail I (r. 1501–1524) in 1510. This was most likely due to religio-political reasons, as Khvandamir was a Sunni Muslim, whereas the Safavids were zealous Shia Muslims. Khvandamir soon left for the neighbouring region of Gharjistan, where he briefly served Badi al-Zaman's son Muhammad Zaman Mirza (died 1540), who unsuccessfully attempted to establish his rule in the area.

=== Under the Safavids ===
In 1521, Khvandamir started writing his universal history Habib al-siyar for the Safavid sadr Amir Ghiyas al-Din Mohammad ibn Amir Yusuf Hosseini, seemingly in order to revitalize his career in Herat. The latter, however, was executed the same year by the governor of the city, Amir Khan Mawsillu (died 1522). Durmish Khan Shamlu (died 1526) was soon made the new governor of Herat, whose vizier Karim al-Din Khvaja Habiballah Savaji became the new patron of Khvandamir. While it is generally agreed that the name of Khvandamir's Habib al-siyar referred to his new patron Habiballah Savaji, it may have in fact referred to Shah Ismail, as the latter is often called habib-i ilahi (friend of God) in the work. In 1524, Khvandamir finished his first version (called A) of the book, and the following year a second version (B), which was an extension of the previous version.

=== Under the Mughals ===
The murder of Habiballah Savaji in 1526 seemingly made Khvandamir reassess his situation in Herat. He accepted the invitation of the Timurid prince and Mughal emperor Babur (r. 1526–1530), who had in the same year established his authority over North India, including the cities of Delhi and Agra. Khvandamir reached India 1528, where wrote a third version (C) of the Habib al-siyar at Babur's court. Khvandamir later wrote the Qanun-i Humayuni ("The regulations of Humayun"), a biography of Babur's son and successor Humayun (r. 1530–1540, 1555–1556), which has important information regarding the early Mughal symbolism of rulership.

== Death, burial and issue ==
Khvandamir died in 1535 or 1536, and was buried near the shrine of Nizamuddin Auliya (died 1325) in Delhi. He was survived by two sons; Amir Mahmud (died after 1550), who stayed in Iran and wrote a history book about the first fifty years of Ṣafavid rule, the Tarikh-i Shah Isma'il va Shah Tahmasb-i Safavi; and Abdallah Khan (died 1589), who served as a government official under the Mughal emperor Akbar (r. 1556–1605).

== Sources ==
- Bashir, Shahzad (2015). "A Perso-Islamic universal chronicle in its historical context: Ghiyās al-Dīn Khwāndamīr's Ḥabīb al-siyar". In Otto, Bernd-Christian; Rau, Susanne; Rüpke, Jörg (eds.). History and Religion: Narrating a Religious Past. Religionsgeschichtliche Versuche und Vorarbeiten 68. Berlin: De Gruyter. pp. 207–223.
- Bockholt, Philip (2020a). "Khvāndamīr". In Fleet, Kate; Krämer, Gudrun; Matringe, Denis; Nawas, John; Rowson, Everett (eds.). Encyclopaedia of Islam (3rd ed.). Brill Online. ISSN 1873-9830.
- Bockholt, Philip (2020b). "Mīrkhvānd". In Fleet, Kate; Krämer, Gudrun; Matringe, Denis; Nawas, John; Rowson, Everett (eds.). Encyclopaedia of Islam (3rd ed.). Brill Online. ISSN 1873-9830.
- Manz, Beatrice Forbes (2007). Power, Politics and Religion in Timurid Iran. Cambridge University Press. ISBN 978-1-139-46284-6.
- Manz, Beatrice Forbes (2014). "ʿAbd al-Razzāq Samarqandī". In Fleet, Kate; Krämer, Gudrun; Matringe, Denis; Nawas, John; Rowson, Everett (eds.). Encyclopaedia of Islam (3rd ed.). Brill Online. ISSN 1873-9830.
- Melville, Charles (2020). The Timurid Century: The Idea of Iran Vol.9. I.B. Tauris. ISBN 978-1838606886.
- Newman, Andrew J. (2008). Safavid Iran: Rebirth of a Persian Empire. I.B.Tauris. pp. 1–296. ISBN 978-0857716613.
- Pollock, Sheldon (2003). Literary Cultures in History: Reconstructions from South Asia. University of California Press. ISBN 978-0520228214.
- Quinn, Sholeh A. (2020). Persian Historiography Across Empires: The Ottomans, Safavids, and Mughals. Cambridge University Press. ISBN 978-1108842211.
- Roemer, H. R. (1986). "The successors of Tīmūr". In Lockhart, Laurence; Jackson, Peter (eds.). The Cambridge History of Iran: The Timurid and Safavid Periods. Vol. 6. Cambridge: Cambridge University Press. ISBN 0-521-20094-6.
- Spuler, Bertold (2003). Persian Historiography and Geography: Bertold Spuler on Major Works Produced in Iran, the Caucasus, Central Asia, India, and Early Ottoman Turkey. Pustaka Nasional Pte Ltd. ISBN 978-9971774882.
