= Mirkhvand =

Persian-language historian (1433/4 – 1498)

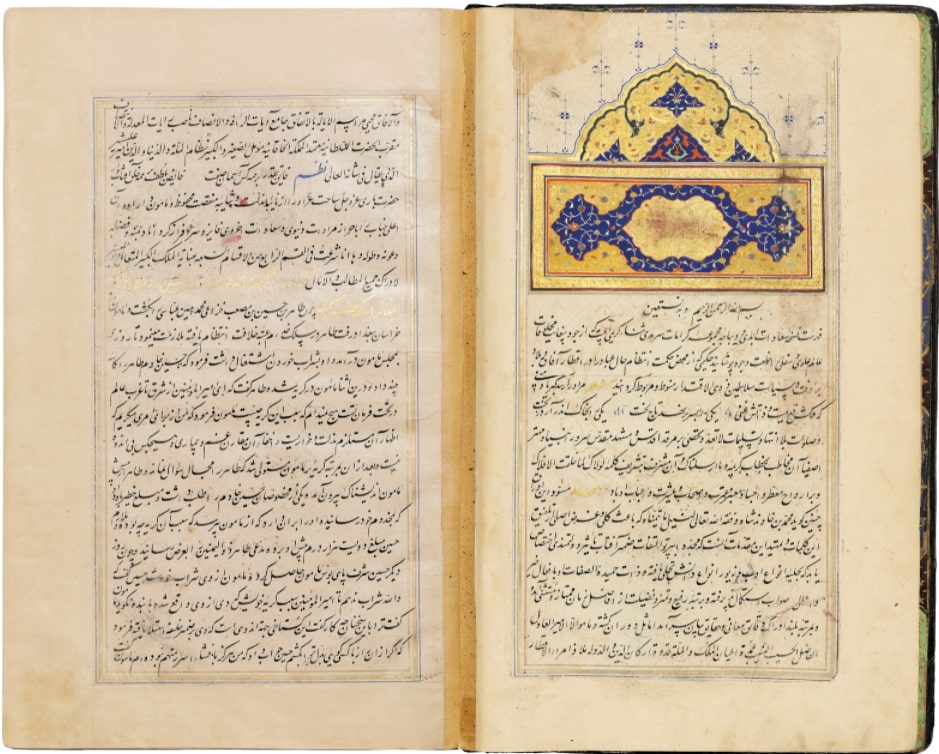
- Manuscript of Mirkhvand's Rawżat aṣ-ṣafāʾ. Copy made in Safavid Iran, dated 1635
- Native name: میرخواند
- Born: 1433/34 Bukhara, Timurid Empire
- Died: 22 June 1498 (aged 64–65) Herat, Timurid Empire
- Occupation: Historian
- Notable works: Rawżat aṣ-ṣafāʾ
- Relatives: Khvandamir (grandson)

Muhammad ibn Khvandshah ibn Mahmud, more commonly known as Mirkhvand (Persian: میرخواند, also transliterated as Mirkhwand; 1433/34 – 1498), was a Persian historian active during the reign of the Timurid ruler Sultan Husayn Bayqara (r. 1469–1506). He is principally known for his universal history, the Rawżat aṣ-ṣafāʾ ("The garden of purity"), which he wrote under the patronage of the high-ranking functionary Ali-Shir Nava'i (died 1501). According to the German orientalist Bertold Spuler, the Rawżat aṣ-ṣafāʾ is the greatest universal history in Persian regarding the Islamic world.

== Life ==
Born in c. 1433/4 in the city of Bukhara in Timurid-ruled Transoxiana, Mirkhvand belonged to a family of sayyids, descendants of the Islamic prophet Muhammad. He was the son of Burhan al-Din Khvandshah (died 1466/7), who was a disciple of the Sufi shaykh Baha al-Din Umar Jaghara'i (died 1453) in the city of Herat, where Mirkhvand's family had distinguished themselves. Mirkhvand's brother was the sadr (head of religious fundings) of the Timurid crown prince Badi' al-Zaman Mirza (died 1514), the eldest son of the incumbent ruler Sultan Husayn Bayqara (r. 1469–1506).

Mirkhvand wrote under the patronage of Ali-Shir Nava'i (died 1501), an important counselor of Husayn Bayqara and advocate of arts and literature. Mirkhvand enjoyed good relations with Nava'i, as indicated of Mirkhvand's description of the latter in his universal history Rawżat aṣ-ṣafāʾ ("The garden of purity"), as well as the positive account of Mirkhvand in Nava'i's biographical dictionary Majālis al-nafāʾis ("The assemblies of rare talents"). Using the Timurid history book Maṭlaʿ al-saʿdayn of Abd al-Razzaq Samarqandi (died 1482) as his cornerstone, Mirkhvand started writing his Rawżat aṣ-ṣafāʾ in 1474/5. Mirkhvand spent many years in the Ilkhlasiyya khanqah, a house for Sufis erected by Nava'i in 1483. Towards the end of his life, he lived for a year at the shrine of the prominent Hanbali and Sufi scholar Khwaja Abdullah Ansari (died 1088), near Herat. Mirkhvand died in Herat on 22 June 1498, and was buried in the shrine of Baha al-Din Umar Jaghara'i, the same place as his father.

Mirkhvand's daughter's son Khvandamir (died 1535/6), whom he had trained and handed over his patronage networks, wrote a concise version of his grandfathers work in 1500, the Khulāṣat al-akhbār fī bayān aḥwāl al-akhyār ("Summary reports on the affairs of those gone by").

== Rawżat aṣ-ṣafāʾ ==
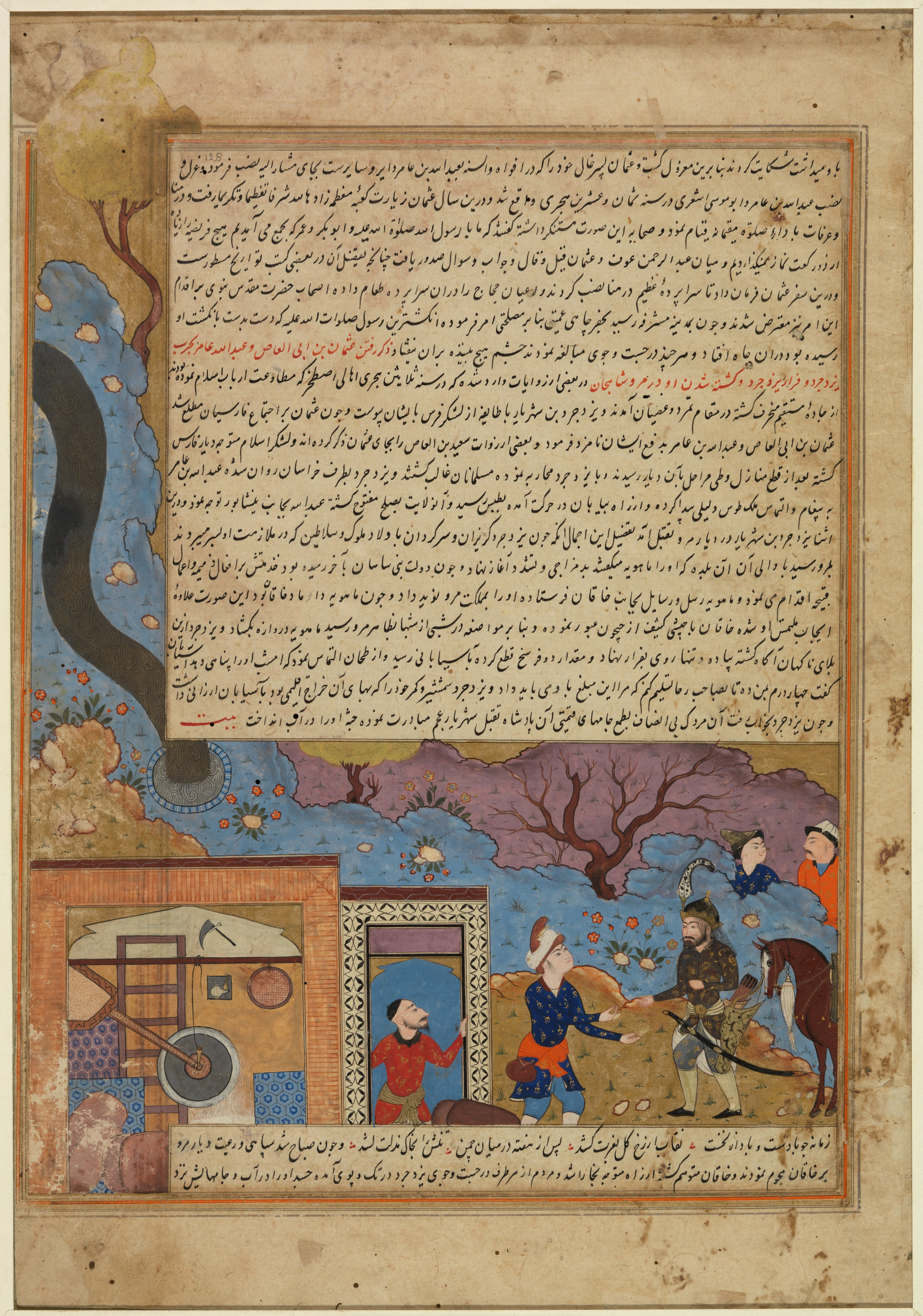
The Sasanian king Yazdegerd III (r. 632–651) flees to the mill in Merv. From a manuscript of the Rawżat aṣ-ṣafāʾ, dated 1595

Mirkhvand's only known work is the Rawżat aṣ-ṣafāʾ, a history of the world since creation from a Muslim point of view, divided into a preface, seven volumes, and an epilogue. The final volume and the epilogue were incomplete at the time of Mirkhvand's death, and were later completed by Khvandamir. A discussion on the advantages of studying history is included in the Rawżat aṣ-ṣafāʾ, a tradition that goes back to at least the 12th century, when Ibn Funduq (died 1169) did the same in his Tarikh-i Bayhaq (1168). Mirkhvand's discussion on the advantages of studying history was copied and modified by three other distinguished historians; Qasim Beg Hayati Tabrizi's Tarikh (1554); Hossein Nishapuri Vuqu'i's Majma al-akhbar (1591/2); and Sharaf Khan Bidlisi's Sharafnama (1596). Mirkhvand's work attracted much attention, as demonstrated by its numerous translations, such as the Ottoman Ḥadīqat al-ʿulyā dedicated by Mustafa ibn Hasanshah to the Ottoman grand vizier Rüstem Pasha (d. 1561) in 1550 and Tercümān-i düstūr fī ḥavādisel-zamān wa-l-dühūr written by Mehmed Kemal Balatzade in 1555. The Rawżat aṣ-ṣafāʾ was one of the three works generally read by history students in Mughal India.

There exist hundreds of copies of Rawżat aṣ-ṣafāʾ, making it one of the most copied Persian history books. However, neither the current editions by Parviz (1959/60) and Kiyanfar (2001) nor the 19th-century lithographs are based on the oldest version of the books. For example, Kiyanfar's edition is based on the Rawżat al-ṣafā-yi Nasir (written in 1854–6) of the 19th-century Iranian writer Reza-Qoli Khan Hedayat (died 1871), a continuation of the Rawżat aṣ-ṣafāʾ and based on a lithograph printed in Bombay in 1849/50. The Rawżat aṣ-ṣafāʾ was frequently used by western orientalists from the 17th to the 19th-century to understand the history of Iran. As a result, there are numerous incomplete translations of it in European languages.

According to the German orientalist Bertold Spuler, the Rawżat aṣ-ṣafāʾ is the greatest universal history in Persian regarding the Islamic world.

== Sources ==
- Bockholt, Philip (2020a). "Mīrkhvānd". In Fleet, Kate; Krämer, Gudrun; Matringe, Denis; Nawas, John; Rowson, Everett (eds.). Encyclopaedia of Islam (3rd ed.). Brill Online. ISSN 1873-9830.
- Bockholt, Philip (2020b). "Khvāndamīr". In Fleet, Kate; Krämer, Gudrun; Matringe, Denis; Nawas, John; Rowson, Everett (eds.). Encyclopaedia of Islam (3rd ed.). Brill Online. ISSN 1873-9830.
- Manz, Beatrice Forbes (2007). Power, Politics and Religion in Timurid Iran. Cambridge University Press. ISBN 978-1-139-46284-6.
- Manz, Beatrice Forbes (2014). "ʿAbd al-Razzāq Samarqandī". In Fleet, Kate; Krämer, Gudrun; Matringe, Denis; Nawas, John; Rowson, Everett (eds.). Encyclopaedia of Islam (3rd ed.). Brill Online. ISSN 1873-9830.
- Melville, Charles, ed. (2020). The Timurid Century: The Idea of Iran Vol.9. I.B. Tauris. ISBN 978-1838606886.
- Pollock, Sheldon (2003). Literary Cultures in History: Reconstructions from South Asia. University of California Press. ISBN 978-0520228214.
- Quinn, Sholeh A. (2020). Persian Historiography Across Empires: The Ottomans, Safavids, and Mughals. Cambridge University Press. ISBN 978-1108842211.
- Roemer, H. R. (1986). "The successors of Tīmūr". In Lockhart, Laurence; Jackson, Peter (eds.). The Cambridge History of Iran: The Timurid and Safavid Periods. Vol. 6. Cambridge: Cambridge University Press. ISBN 0-521-20094-6.
- Spuler, Bertold (2003). Persian Historiography and Geography: Bertold Spuler on Major Works Produced in Iran, the Caucasus, Central Asia, India, and Early Ottoman Turkey. Pustaka Nasional Pte Ltd. ISBN 978-9971774882.
