= Muhammad Muhsin Mirza =

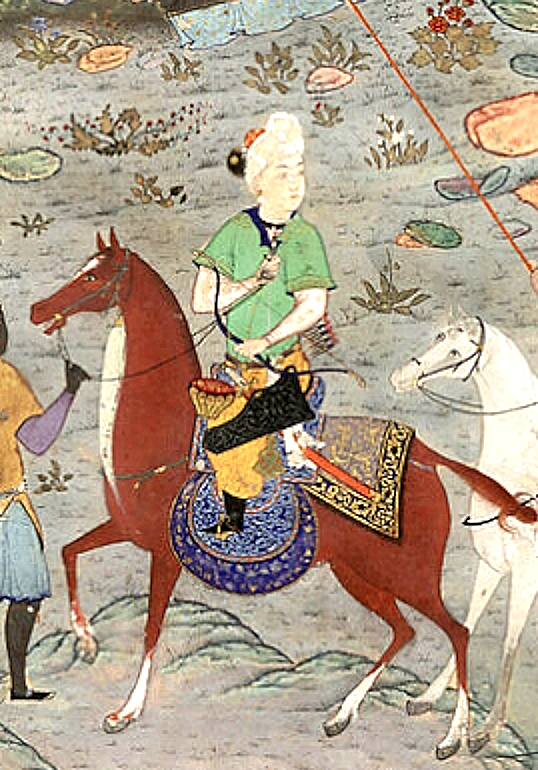
- Likely depiction of Timurid Prince Muhammad Muhsin on horse, circa 1496.

Governor of Abivard
- Reign: 1505-1507
- Born: 1474/6; Herat
- Died: 1507
- House: Timurid
- Dynasty: Timurid dynasty
- Father: Sultan Husayn Bayqara
- Mother: Latif Sultan Aghacha
- Religion: Sunni Islam

Muhammad Muhsin Mirza ("Sultan Muhammad Muhsin Bahadur Khan", also called "Kipek Mirza", or "Kebek Khan" meaning "hunchback") was a son of Sultan Husayn Bayqara, and a Timurid Empire Governor of Abivard from 1505 to 1507. Together with his brother Abu'l Muhsin, he rebelled against his father, and ruled in Mashhad from 1506 to 1507. He died in 1507, killed by Uzbeks.

In 1497, Muhammad Muhsin Mirza was involved in a conflict with Muzafar-Husayn, but was defeated and narrowly escaped assassination.

Muhammad Muhsin Mirza is connected to the end of Timurid Herat. His father Husayn Bayqara fought against the Uzbeks and requested the support of Babur, but died in May 1506. His sons Badi' al-Zaman Mirza and Muzaffar Husayn Mirza, as joint successors, attempted to reestablish Timurid control and tried to reunite the Timurid princes. Babur came to their support in October 1506, but had to leave in December for lack of provisions, criticizing that the Timurids as "Dreamers, they moved through a dream". Still, Muhammad Muhsin Mirza and his brother Abu'l Muhsin refused to leave their fief in Mashhad, but were eventually killed by the Uzbeks in 1507. The Uzbeks under Muhammad Shaybani finally captured Herat on 23 May 1507.

Muhammad Muhsin Mirza is known for the commissioning of a sumptuous manuscript, a 1496 copy of Hasht Bihisht (Topkapı Sarayı Kütüphanesi, H. 676), in which the frontispiece shows him leading a hunt.

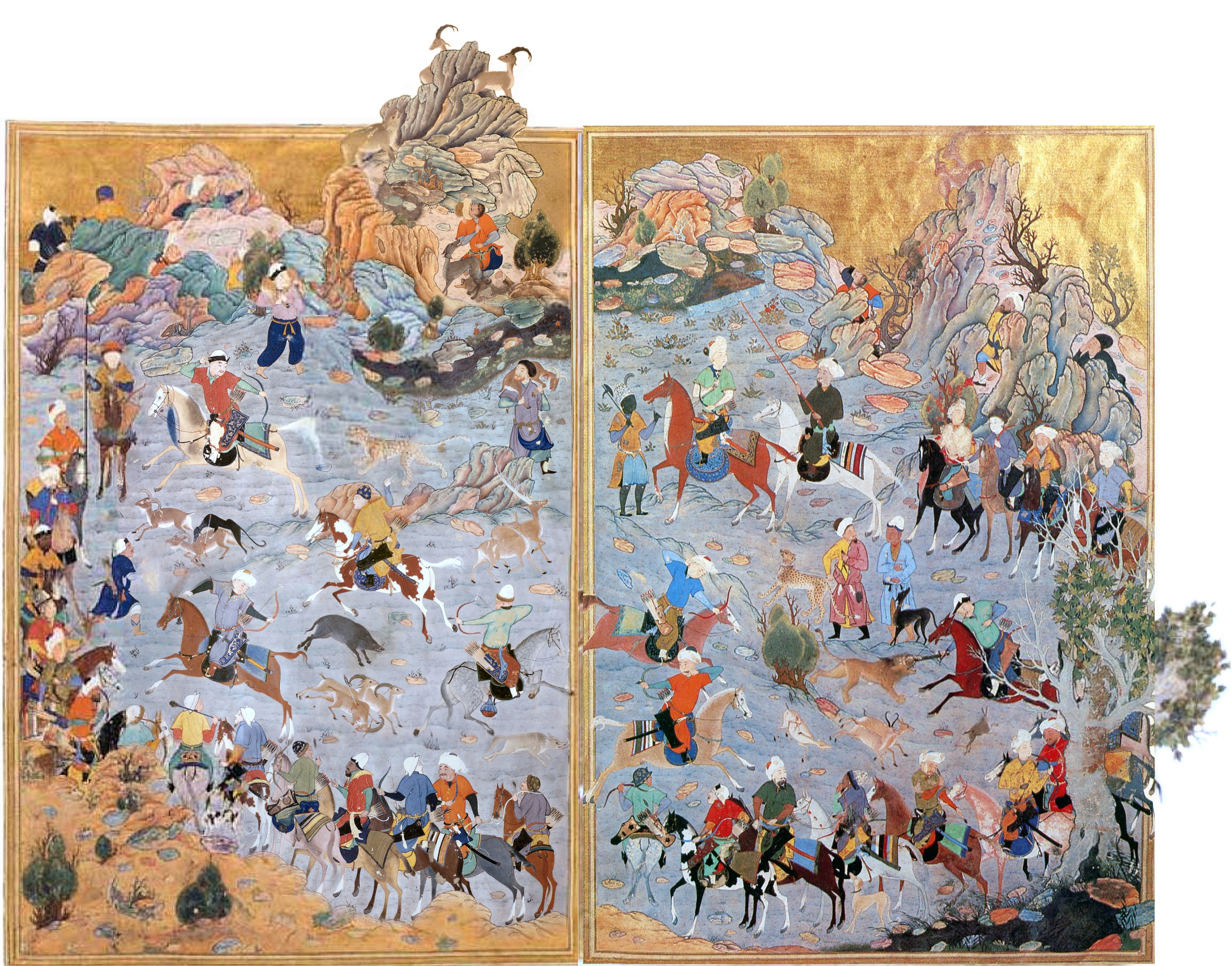
Hunting scene led by Muhammad Muhsin Mirza, from the Hast Bahist by Kamal al-Din Bihzad, Herat, 1496.
