= Khadija Begi Agha =

Wife of Sultan Husayn Bayqara

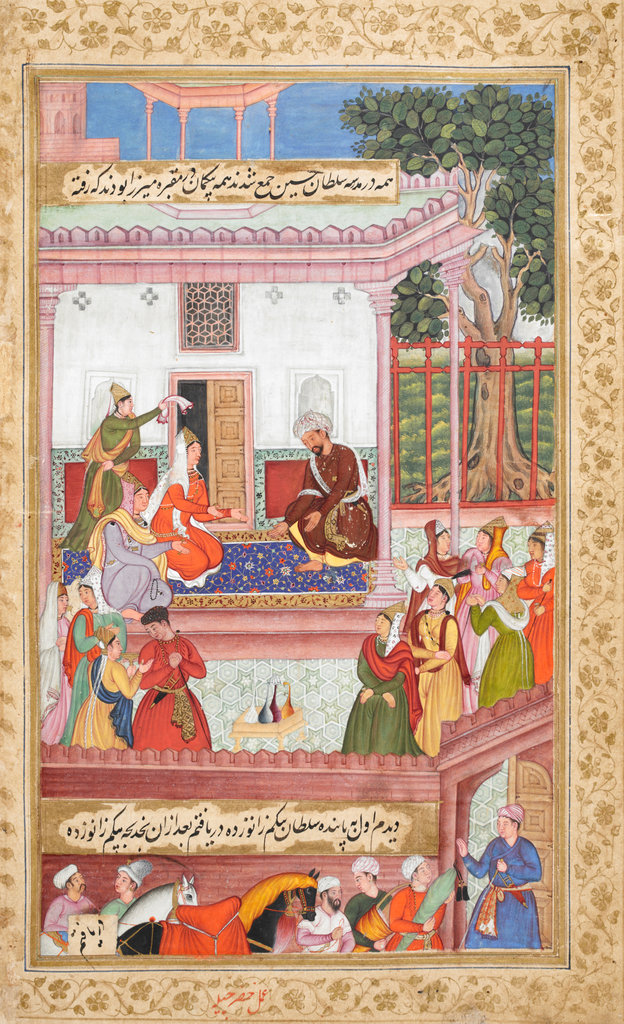

Consort of Timurid Empire
- Tenure: 1450s – 1506
- Born: 1451
- Died: after 1509
- Spouse: Abu Sa'id Mirza Sultan Husayn Bayqara (died 1506)
- Issue: With Abu Sa'id Mirza; Aq Begim; With Sultan Husyan Bayqara; Muzaffar Husayn Mirza; Shah Gharib Mirza; Sultan Jahangir Mirza; Jahangir Husain Mirza; Khanum Sultan Begum
- House: Timurid dynasty (by marriage)
- Father: Amir Muhammed Sariq ibn Muhammad Khoja

Khadija Begi Agha was a Timurid royal consort. She was the concubine of Abu Sa'id Mirza (r. 1451–1469), the legal wife of sultan Husayn Bayqara (r. 1496–1506), and the mother of Muzaffar Husayn Mirza (r. 1506–1507). She belonged to the few politically influential women of the Timurid dynasty.

== Sultan concubine ==
Khadija Begi Agha was the daughter of Amir Muhammed Sariq, a local nobleman of little significance. She was given as a concubine to the Timurid harem of Abu Sa'id Mirza. She had a daughter named Aq Begim.

The Timurid dynasty broke Islamic law about slavery in islam which dictated that the sex slaves (concubines) of Muslims should always be slaves. In addition to their traditional enslaved concubines (sarariy), the Timurid dynasty controversially had free Muslim women as concubines (qumayan) in addition to their free legal wives (khavatin). This was highly controversial and criticized, but ultimately accepted by the families of the free concubines, who thereby had a higher chance of getting their daughters to become consorts of the Timurid rulers. Most of the women of the Timurid dynasty, wives as well as concubines, are only fragmentarily known, and Khadija Begi Agha is one of a few acknowledged to have had any political influence.

When Abu Sa'id Mirza died in 1469, his successor sultan Husayn Bayqara also took her as his concubine. He appear to have done this because of personal attraction or emotional infatuation, since it was not the tradition for a Timurid ruler to take his predecessors concubines, nor did she come from an influential family that could provide any political advantage.

In 1471, she gave birth to her first son, Shah-Grarib (1471-1497), and afterward the sultan married her. This was not the custom or because of any political advantage but was described as unique.

== Sultan wife ==
Her personal influence over the affairs of state via her consort attracted growing attention and criticism after her marriage. Her eldest son was appointed governor of Herat, but he was sickly, and she engaged actively in the ambition and promotion of her younger son, and used her influence to favor his career. She created a network of contacts within the Timurid court as well as with the literary elite to benefit her son Muzaffar Husayn Mirza in his ambitions to succeed his father. He was appointed governor of Astrabad in 1497.

She worked against her stepsons Badi al-Zaman and Muhammad-Mumin. During the rebellion of her stepsons against their father and her husband Husayn Bayqara, he was advised against a reconciliation by his vizier Khvaja Nizam al-Mulk, who was known to be one of her loyal allies, and the sabotage of the reconciliation has been attributed to her. When her stepson Muhammad-Mumin was captured and imprisoned in Herat, she gave the order of his execution.

== Sultan mother ==
Khadija Begi Agha was widowed in 1506. Her husband was succeeded by her son Muzaffar Husayn Mirza in co-regency with her stepson Badi' al-Zaman Mirza, based in Herat. As the mother of the sultan she was in a high position, but was subjected to much criticism and slander because of her influence. Muhammad Hayder Dughlat referred to her as "the instigator of all mischief", and claimed that when prince Jahangir Mirza Babur became ill after having consumed vine in Herat, "it was communly rumoured that Khadija Begi Agha was up to her old tricks and had poisoned his wine".

== Legacy ==
Khadija Begi Agha was described in the work of Babur as well as in Muizz al-Ansad.
