= Forster Fitzgerald Arbuthnot =

British orientalist (1833–1901)

Forster Fitzgerald Arbuthnot (21 May 1833 – 25 May 1901) was a notable British Orientalist and translator.

== Biography ==
Arbuthnot's early career was spent as a civil servant in India; his last post was as Collector for the Bombay government. He was named after his grandfather, Field Marshal Sir John FitzGerald. His first name is sometimes spelled "Foster".

Arbuthnot was well versed in the ancient literature of India. He collaborated with his close friend Sir Richard Burton in the translations of two Sanskrit erotic texts, the Kama Sutra of Vatsayana (1883) and The Ananga Ranga (1885), both privately printed by the Kama Shastra Society (a fictitious organisation consisting of himself and Burton, a legal device to avoid obscenity laws). He also wrote the books Arabic Authors, The Mysteries of Chronology, Early Ideas (1881, under the pseudonym Anaryan) and Sex Mythology, Including an Account of the Masculine Cross (1898, privately printed), which attempts to trace the phallic origins of religious symbols. He edited the Rawżat aṣ-ṣafāʾ (روضة الصفا, ‘garden of purity’) by Mīr-Khvānd, translated by the Orientalist Edward Rehatsek from 1891 to 1894.

It is largely due to his work that several of the masterpieces of Arabic, Persian and Indian literature first became available in English translation.

== Publications ==
=== Written ===
- Early Ideas : A Group of Hindoo Stories. London: W. H. Allen and Co. 1881. OCLC 1080679008.
- Free Trade in Land. London: Cassell & Company. 1885. OCLC 1051491107.
- Persian Portraits. A Sketch of Persian History, Literature and Politics. London: Bernard Quaritch. 1887. OCLC 634978922.
- Arabic Authors; a Manual of Arabian History and Literature. London: William Heinemann. 1890. OCLC 1051484584.
- The Mysteries of Chronology, with Proposal for a New English Era, to be called the Victorian. London: William Heinemann. 1900. OCLC 1013417308.

=== Translated ===
- Vatsyayana (1883). The Kama Sutra of Vatsyayana. Translated by Arbuthnot, Forster Fitzgerald; Burton, Richard Francis. "Cosmopoli": Kama Shastra Society.
- Kalyāṇamalla (1885). Ananga-ranga (stage of the bodiless one) or, The Hindu Art of Love. Translated by Arbuthnot, Forster Fitzgerald; Burton, Richard Francis. "Cosmopoli": Kama Shastra Society.

=== Edited ===
- Muhammad ibn Khvandshah ibn Mahmud (1891–94). Arbuthnot, Forster Fitzgerald (ed.). The Rauzat-us-safa; or, Garden of Purity. Translated by Rehatsek, Edward. London: Royal Asiatic Society. OCLC 473658564. Part 1 Vol 1, Part 1 Vol 2, Part 2 Vol 1, Part 2 Vol 2, Part 2 Vol 3
