= Muhammad Sultan Mirza (late Timurid) =

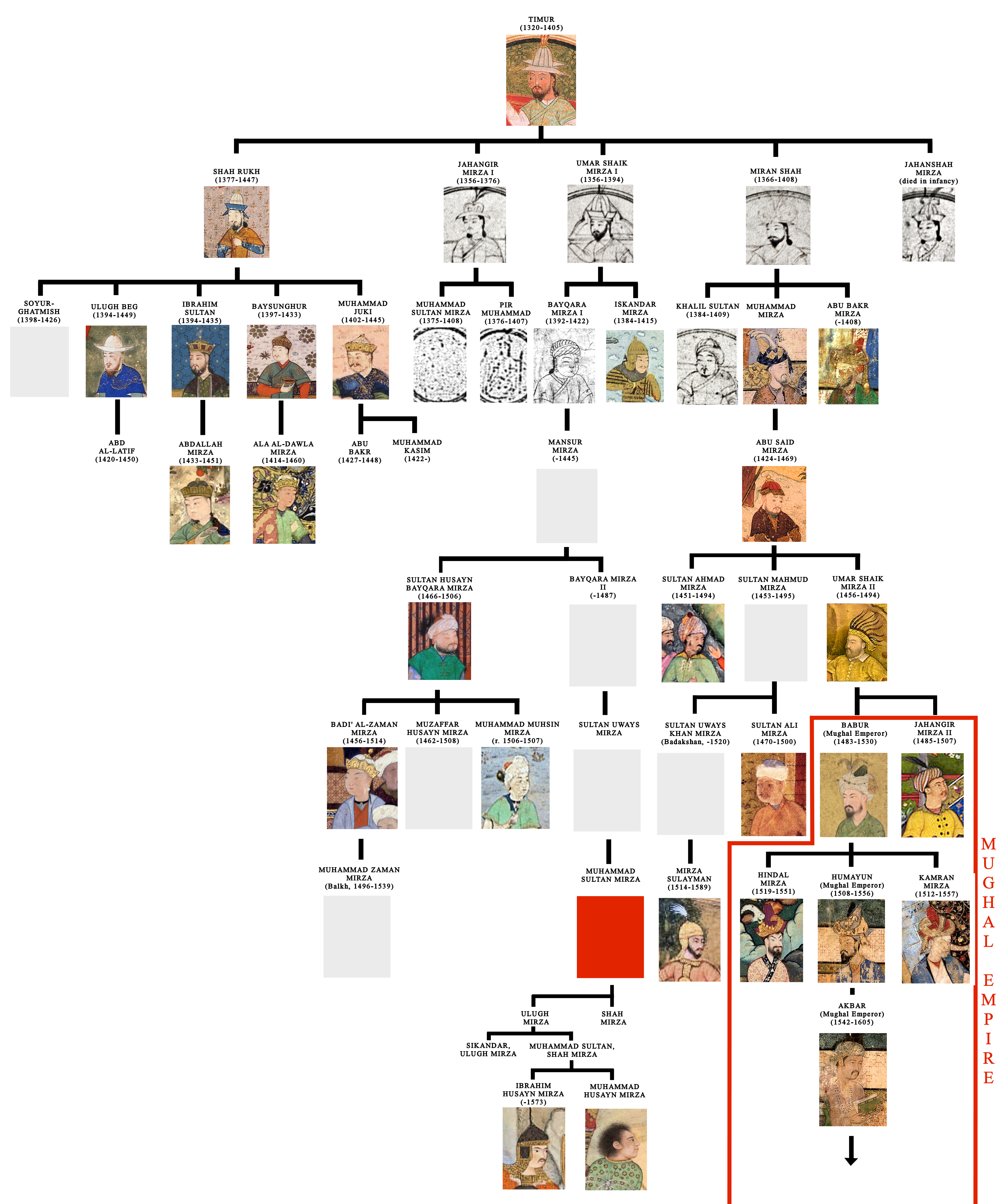
Muhammad Sultan Mirza ( ) in Timurid genealogy

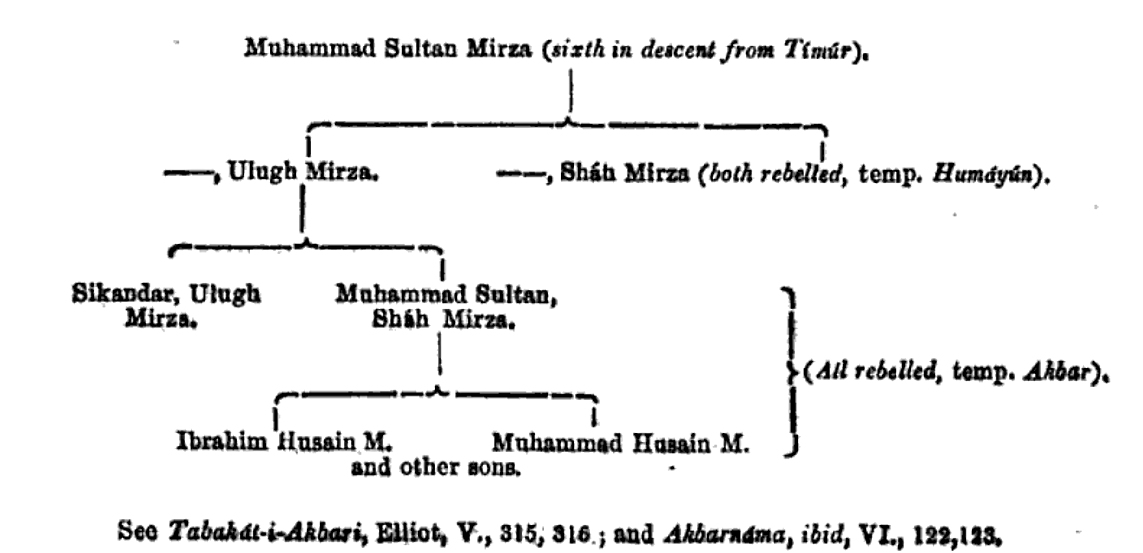
Descendents of Muhammad Sultan Mirza

Muhammad Sultan Mirza was a member of the late Timurid dynasty, and one of Emperor Babur's favourite officers. He was the son of Sultan Uways Mirza, and was therefore a "Bayqara Timurid", a descendant of Sultan Husayn Bayqara, together with Muhammad Zaman Mirza.

Muhammad Sultan Mirza participated to the Battle of Panipat in 1526, together with Junaid Barlas, Qasim Husain Sultan Mirza and Muhammad Zaman Mirza. In 1527, Babur nominated Muhammad Sultan Mirza Governor of the regions beyond the Ganges, which were still occupied by Afghan forces.

In 1534, Muhammad Sultan Mirza rebelled against the new Mughal Emperor Humayun, raising an army of 6000 Afghans and Rajputs at Kannauj. Muhammad Sultan Mirza attempted to capture Delhi from the Mughal Empire. He was a descendent of Abu Sa'id's second son, Sultan Mahmud Mirza, which theoretically gave him a claim to the Mughal throne of India, currently held by descendents of Abu Sa'id's third son Umar Shaikh Mirza II, in the person of Babur, Humayun or Akbar. Hindustan had been conquered by Timur in 1398, which gave justification for later Timurids to claim overlordship in these regions. The troops of Muhammad Sultan Mirza were finally vanquished by Hindal Mirza in 1537.

Muhammad Sultan Mirza had numerous sons and grandsons who fought for his cause against the Mughal Empire, mainly trying to occupy Delhi.Several battles took place between the Mughal ruler Akbar and the various Timurid princes, generally called "Mirza" (a princely title derived from the Persian Amirzadeh, meaning "born of the amir", i.e. Timur). Ultimately, Muhammad Sultan Mirza was vanquished and captured by Mughal loyalist troops.

His sons and grandsons however continued to be active in the area of Gujarat, which they tried to acquire for themselves. Among his sons or grandsons were Muhammad Husain Mirza and his brother Ibrahim Husayn Mirza. In July 1573, Muhammad Husain Mirza attempted to capture the region of Gujarat after Akbar’s departure from the region, laying siege to Ahmedabad. Mughal forces were called in by the Governor of the region Aziz Koka, and they eventually defeated Muhammad Husain Mirza on 2 September. After his defeat, Muhammad Husain Mirza found refuge in the Deccan, at the court of Ahmadnagar. He had to flee following diplomatic action by the Mughals, and arrived in Khandesh. Akbar sent an expedition to Khandesh, and the Raja Ali surrendered Muhammad Husain Mirza to the Mughals.

== Sources ==
- Chandra, Satish (2005). Medieval India: From Sultanat to the Mughals Part - II. Har-Anand Publications. p. 190. ISBN 978-81-241-1066-9.
- Richards, John F. (1993). The Mughal Empire. Cambridge University Press. p. 18. ISBN 978-0-521-56603-2.
- Sheth, Sudev (30 November 2023). Bankrolling Empire: Family Fortunes and Political Transformation in Mughal India. Cambridge University Press. p. 66. ISBN 978-1-009-33026-8.
- Victoria and Albert Museum (2025). "Husain Mirza". Victoria and Albert Museum.
- Dale, Stephen F. (3 May 2018). Babur: Timurid Prince and Mughal Emperor, 1483–1530. Cambridge University Press. pp. 203–204, note 19. ISBN 978-1-316-99637-9.
