= Sultan Uways Mirza =

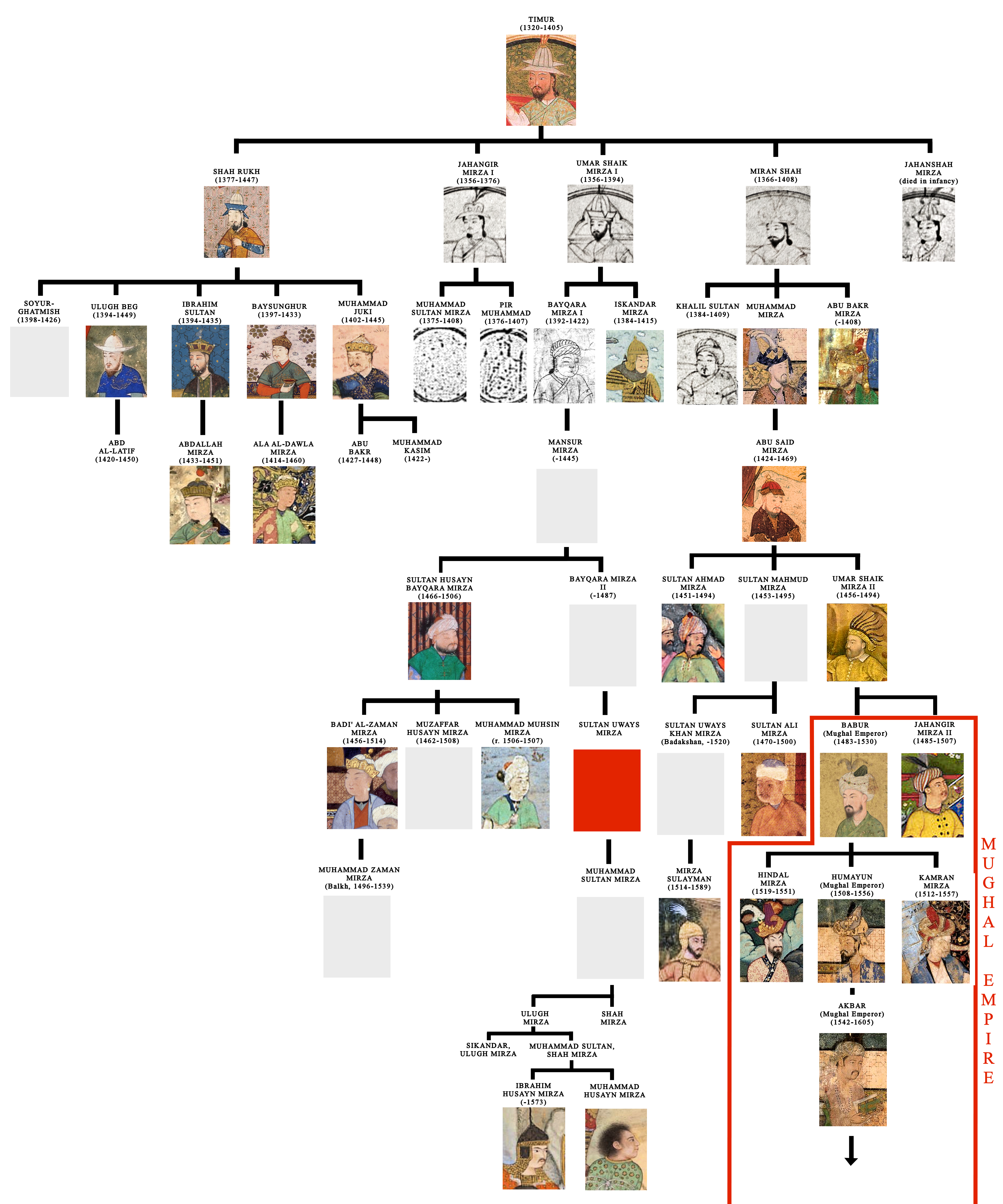
Sultan Uways Mirza in Timurid genealogy

Sultan Uways Mirza, also Uwais Mirza,Wais Mirza, was a prince of the late Timurid dynasty. He was a son of Bayqara Mirza II (d.1487) with his wife Sa'ādat Sultan, and a grandson of Mansur Mirza. He had two wives named Zaynab Sultan and Turdi Sultan. Sultan Uways was therefore a nephew of Sultan Husayn Bayqara.

He was the father of Muhammad Sultan Mirza who became one of the most trusted officers of Babur, but later rebelled against the Mughal Empire.

== Issue ==
By Zaynab Sultanum, daughter of Sultan Husayn Bayqara

- Farrukh Nizhad
- Muhammad Mansur
- Muhammad Sultan
- Ruqaye Sultan
- Zubayde Sultan
- Qutluq Sultan

By Turdi Sultan

- Agha Biki

Unknown wife

- Biki Bike

A lesser Sultan Uways is also known, son of Muhammad Mirza with Maryam, grandson of Bayqara Mirza I (1393-1423), without known descendants.

== Sources ==
- Dale, Stephen F. (3 May 2018). Babur: Timurid Prince and Mughal Emperor, 1483–1530. Cambridge University Press. pp. 203–204, note 19. ISBN 978-1-316-99637-9.
