= Rawzat as-safa =

Book by Mirkhvand

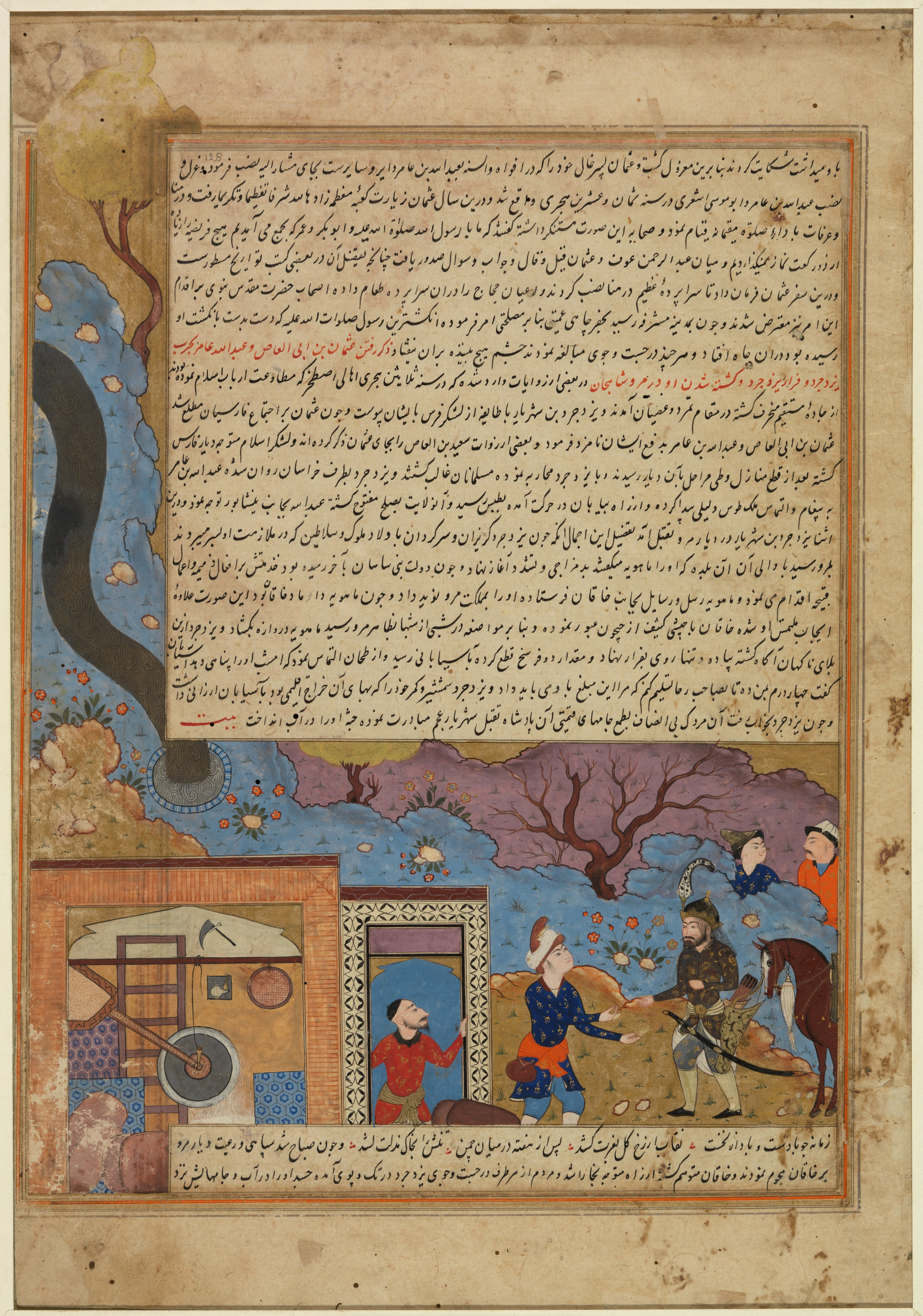
Yazdegerd III flees to the mill in Merv. Page from the Safavid manuscript of Rawzat as-safa from 1595. Chester Beatty Library

Rawżat aṣ-ṣafāʾ fī sīrat al-anbiyāʾ w-al-mulūk w-al-khulafāʾ (روضة الصفا في سیرة الانبياء والملوك والخلفاء, ‘The Gardens of purity in the biography of the prophets and kings and caliphs’) or Rawdatu 's-safa is a Persian-language history of the origins of Islam, early Islamic civilisation, and Persian history by Mirkhvand. The text was originally completed in seven volumes in 1497 AD; the eighth volume is a geographical index. The work is very scholarly: Mirkhvand used nineteen major Arabic histories and twenty-two major Persian ones as well as others which he occasionally quotes. His work was the basis for many subsequent histories, including the works of Hajji Khalifa.

== Style ==
Mirkhvand made little attempt at a critical examination of historical traditions and wrote in a flowery and often bombastic style. It comprises seven large volumes and a geographical appendix; but the seventh volume, the history of the sultan Hosayn, together with a short account of some later events down to 1523, cannot have been written by Mirkhvand himself, who died in 1498. He may have compiled the preface, but it was his grandson, the historian Khvandamir (1475–1534), who continued the main portion of this volume and to whom also a part of the appendix must be ascribed.

=== Manuscripts, editions and translations ===
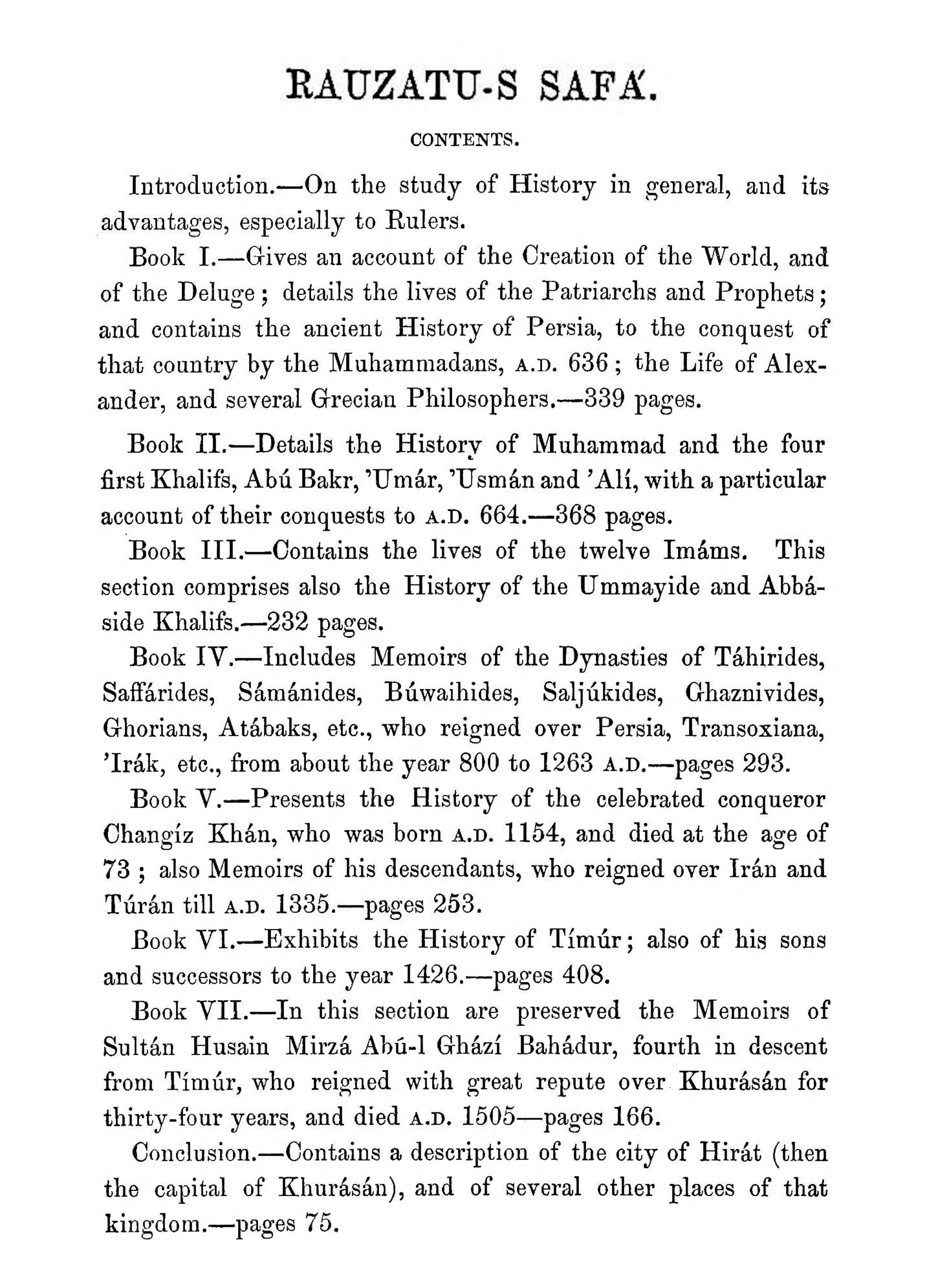
Rawzat as-safa, Table of content.

There are various different Persian manuscripts in Iran, Vienna, Paris, and London. A Persian edition was published in Paris in 1843 as Histoire des Samanides par Mirkhond. It was published fully in Persian in 1843 (Paris) and lithographed in Mumbai (1848 or 1852). The standard edition used in scholarship is the Persian edition Tarikh-i Rawzat al-Safa (7 vols) by Abbas Parviz (Tehran, 1959).

=== Translations ===
Owing to its popularity, the Rawzat as-safa' has undergone several editions and translations. Around 1596, Pedro Teixeira prepared a Spanish translation of the Rawzat as-safa'. The book was partially translated into English in 1715, the Tahirid and Saffarid portions (of chapter 2.3-4) into Latin in 1782, and the Sassanid portion (of chapter 1.2) into French in 1793. A section was translated as Mirchondi Historia Seldschukidarum (1838) by Johann August Vullers.

From 1892 to 1893, a translation of the first book (up to the Rashidun caliphs) into English was prepared by the Orientalist Edward Rehatsek and edited by Forster Fitzgerald Arbuthnot for the Royal Asiatic Society, in two parts. The Vie de Mahomet d'après la tradition by E. Lamairesse and Gaston Dujarric was translated from the English (1897).

== Mentions of Jesus ==
Mir Khvand makes mention of Jesus from the Quran. Mir Khvand records a number of miracles related to Jesus, including those mentioned in the Koran, such as Jesus speaking from the cradle, healing lepers, and raising the dead.

The text in Edward Rehatsek's translation of the Garden of Purity contains a version of the Abgar legend, regarding the conversion of King Abgar of Edessa (called Nassibin or Nasibain in the Persian text) before the crucifixion:

Historians have reported that in the time of I’sa — u. w. b., etc. — there was a king in the country of Nassibin who was very arrogant and tyrannical. I’sa having been sent on a mission to him, started towards Nassibin. When he arrived in the vicinity, he halted and said to his apostles: ‘Which of you will enter the city and say: I’sa, who is a servant of Allah, His messenger and His word, is coming to you.’

Ghulam Ahmad (Urdu 1899, English 1978) and later publications of the Ahmadiyya Muslim Community such as Review of Religions give a paraphrase of the Abgar story from Mir Kvand's Rawzat as-safa', also apparently placing the story of Jesus’s travels to Syria during his ministry and before the crucifixion, though later Ahmadi writers infer the events are after the crucifixion. Ahmad considered that "If the report in the Rauzat-us-Safaa is correct, it appears that, by travelling to Nasibain, Jesus intended to go to Afghanistan through Persia, and to invite to the Truth the lost tribes of Jews who had come to be known as Afghans."

== Editions ==
- English (re-print) via Zavia Books, with translation by Sheikh Syed Mubarik Ali Jilani Hashimi (2005).
- English in 1832 – “no oriental work that stood higher in public estimation than this”.
- Nawal Kishore Press, Lucknow, (n.d.)
- Arabic (1988) – روضة الصفا في سيرة الأنبياء والملوك والخلفاء - محمد بن خاوندشاه - الدار المصرية للكتاب؛ المحقق السباعس محمد السباعي, أحمد عبد القادر الشاذلي

== Work online ==
- Elliot, H. M. (Henry Miers), Sir; John Dowson (1871). "23. Rawżat aṣ-ṣafāʾ, of Mirkhond". The History of India, as Told by Its Own Historians. The Muhammadan Period (Vol 4.). London : Trübner & Co. p. 127.
- https://archive.org/details/b29318981

== See also ==
- List of Sunni books
