= Muhammad Husain Mirza =

Mughal nobleman

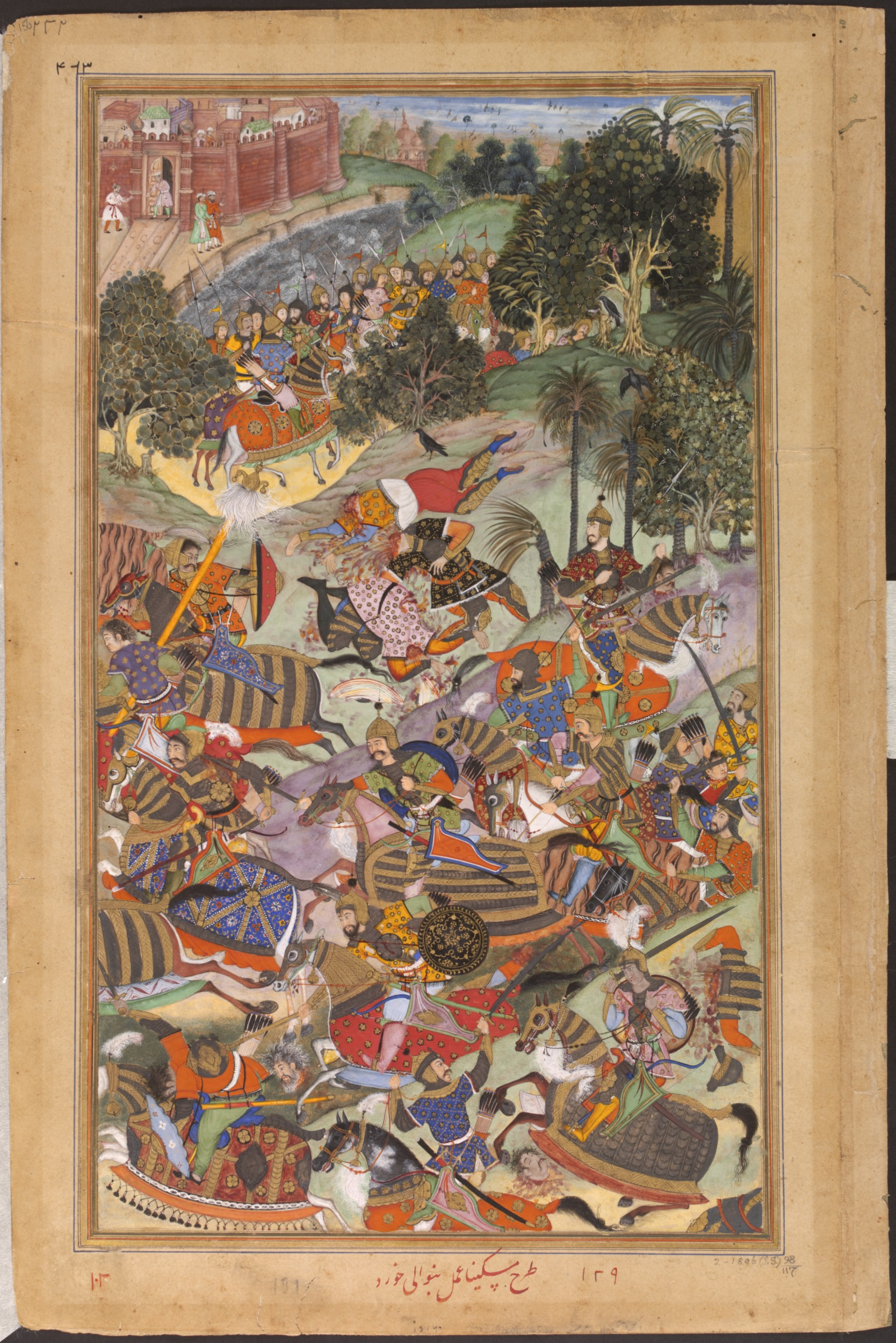
Battle between the Imperial Mughal Army and Muhammad Husain Mirza near Ahmadabad in 1573. Akbarnama

Muhammad Husain Mirza (died 1573) was a member of the late Timurid dynasty who attempted to secure the territory of Gujarat against the Mughal Empire. He was the great-grandson of Muhammad Sultan Mirza, and brother of Ibrahim Husayn Mirza.

Hindustan had been conquered by Timur in 1398, which gave justification for later Timurids to claim overlordship in these regions. Several battles took place between the Mughal ruler Akbar and the various Timurid princes, generally called "Mirza" (a princely title derived from the Persian Amirzadeh, meaning "born of the amir", i.e. Timur).

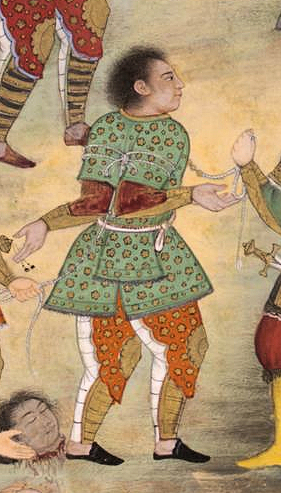
Captured Muhammad Husayn Mirza, being remitted to Akbar, 2 September 1573

In July 1573, Muhammad Husain Mirza attempted to capture the region of Gujarat after Akbar’s departure from the region. Ibrahim Husayn Mirza, Muhammad Husayn Mīrzā and Shāh Mīrzā finally succeeded in capturing the cities of Baroda, Surat and Champaner, finally laying siege to Ahmedabad. Mughal forces were called in by the Governor of the region Aziz Koka, and they eventually defeated Muhammad Husain Mirza on 2 September.

After his defeat, Muhammad Husain Mirza found refuge in the Deccan, at the court of Ahmadnagar. He had to flee following diplomatic action by the Mughals, and arrived in Khandesh. Akbar threatened Khandesh, and the Raja Ali Khan surrendered Muhammad Husain Mirza to the Mughals.

The Mughal conquest of Gujarat against the Mirzas is extensively covered in the Akbarnama, being the subject of twelve paintings.

== Sources ==
- Chandra, Satish (2005). Medieval India: From Sultanat to the Mughals Part - II. Har-Anand Publications. p. 190. ISBN 978-81-241-1066-9.
- Sheth, Sudev (30 November 2023). Bankrolling Empire: Family Fortunes and Political Transformation in Mughal India. Cambridge University Press. p. 66. ISBN 978-1-009-33026-8.
- Victoria and Albert Museum (2025). "Husain Mirza". Victoria and Albert Museum.
