= Tarikh-i Bayhaq =

Tarikh-i Bayhaq (Persian: تاریخ بیهق) is a book on the history of Bayhaq, written in the Persian language in the 12th century, by Abu'l-Hasan Bayhaqi.

== Contents ==
The Tarikh-i Bayhaq contains invaluable information about the Eastern parts of Iran during Ghaznavid and Seljuk eras. Its most important aspect is that it is based on earlier sources which are no longer available. Bayhaqi stated the Tarik-i Bayhaq was written using an earlier history of Bayhaq and the Târîkh `Ulamâ' Ahl Naysabûr by Al-Hakim Nishapuri. Bayhaq makes note of Abul-Fazl Bayhaqi's work, Tarikh-i Bayhaqi, stating it consisted of 30 volumes and that he had seen partial sets in Sarakhs and Nishapur, but never complete sets.

Ahmad ibn Mohammad Khwafi states the Tarikh-i Bayhaq was completed in c.1150/544 AH during the reign of Sultan Sanjar of Seljuk Empire, but according to Bayhaqi, the book was completed in c.1168/563 in Sheshtomad. Yaqut al-Hamawi and Fasih Khafi mentioned this book in their works.

== Modern era ==
In 1895, Charles Pierre Henri Rieu analysed the book's contents in Supplement to the Catalogue of Persian MSS. in the British Museum. Ahmad Bahmanyar published an edition of the Tarikh-i Bayhaq in 1938, which contained an introduction written by M. Kazwini.
