= Muzaffar Husayn Mirza =

- Sultan of Herat

Emir of Timurid in Herat
- Reign: 1506-1507
- Predecessor: Husayn Bayqarah
- Successor: Muhammad Shaybani
- Born: 1472/3
- Died: 1507/9 (aged 35-37)
- Father: Husayn Bayqarah
- Mother: Khadija Begi Agha

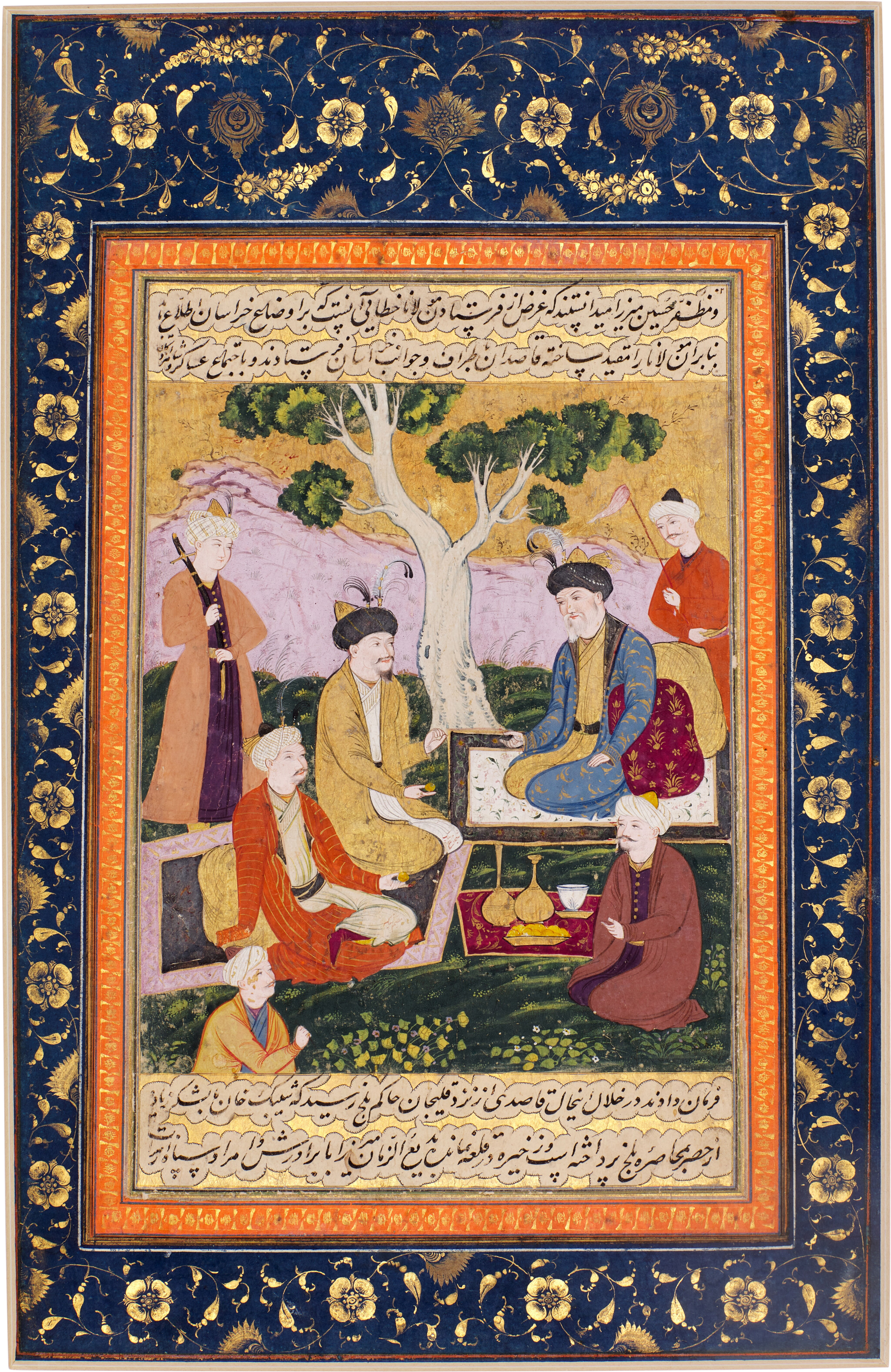
Muzaffar Husayn Mirza and Badi' al-Zaman Mirza Receive Muqi Beg and Shuja Beg in Herat, following the death of their father, attributable to Mu'in Musavvir circa 1686-1690

Muzaffar Husayn was the last Timurid sultan of Herat who ruled from 1506 to 1507, together with his brother Badi' al-Zaman Mirza.

He was the son of Sultan Husayn Bayqara and Khadija Begi Agha. Badi al-Zaman, his older brother, had revolted at least twice against the father, but when their father died, Badi al-Zaman proclaimed himself successor. Muzaffar Husayn, who had been his father's favorite and who had some support among the nobility and emirs, did not recognize his brother and proclaimed himself Sultan.

In the meantime, the threat from the Uzbeks under Muhammad Shaybani was imminent. Emir Babur from Kabul arrived in Herat to help defend the city, but the two brothers did not stop their infight and Babur retreated to Kabul. A few months later, Muhammad Shaybani and his Uzbeks conquered Herat.

The two brothers fled and Muzaffar died from illness soon after (around 1508) in Astrabad.

== Sources ==
- Babur (1826). Memoirs of Zehir-Ed-Din Muhammed Babur: Emperor of Hindustan. Longman, Rees, Orme, Brown, & Green. pp. 198–208.

Muzaffar Husayn Mirza End of the Umarid Timurid dynasty
Preceded by Husayn Bayqarah	Timurid Empire (in Herat); 1506–1507	Succeeded by Muhammad Shaybani (as leader of the Uzbek Khanate of Bukhara)
