= Husayn Bayqara =

Timurid ruler of Herat (c.1469–1506)

Sultan Husayn Bayqara
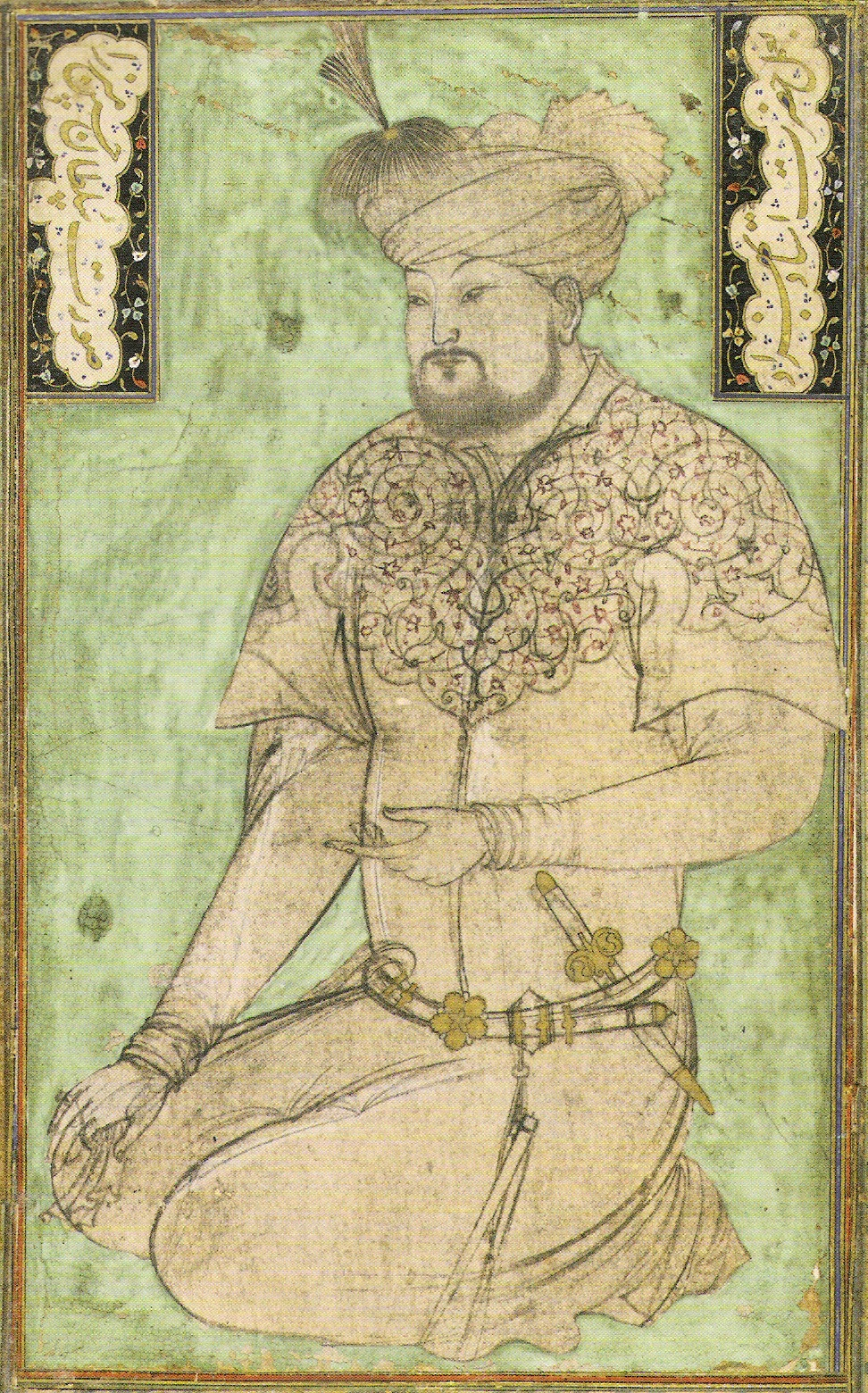
- Portrait of Sultan Husayn Mirza Bayqara at the age of about 50 years. Copy from Kamāl ud-Dīn Behzād's original about 1490

Amir of the Timurid Empire
- Reign: 24 March 1469 – 4 May 1506
- Predecessor: Abul-Qasim Babur Mirza; Abu Sa'id Mirza
- Successor: Badi' al-Zaman Mirza & Muzaffar Husayn Mirza
- Born: June 1438; Herat, present-day Afghanistan
- Died: 4 May 1506 (age 68); Baba Ilahi, Khurasan
- Burial: Musalla Complex, Herat, present-day Afghanistan
- Spouses: Bega Sultan Begum; Chuli Begum; Shahr Banu Begum; Payanda Sultan Begum; Khadija Begi Agha; Zainab Sultan Begum; Afak Begum; Zobeida Sultan Aghacha; Baba Aghacha; Latifa Sultan Aghacha; Mangeli Bi Aghacha; Begi Sultan Aghacha
- Issue: Badi' al-Zaman Mirza; Muzaffar Husayn Mirza; Shah Gharīb Mirza; Abul Hassan Mirza; Muhammad Muhsin Mirza; Abu Tarab Mirza; Muhammad Husayn Mirza; Feridun Husayn Mirza; Haider Mirza; Muhammad Maasum Mirza; Farrukh Husayn Mirza; Ibrahim Husayn Mirza; Ibn Husayn Mirza; Muhammad Qasim Mirza; Sultanim Begum; Ak Begum; Kechek Begum; Bega Begum; Agha Begum; Fatima Sultan Begum; Nizhad Sultan Begum; Sa'adat Bakht Begum; Aisha Sultan Begum; Maryam Sultan Begum; Munawar Sultan Begum
Names
- Husayn Mirza bin Mansur bin Bayqarah bin Umar Shaikh bin Timur
- House: Timurid
- Dynasty: Timurid dynasty
- Father: Mansur Mirza
- Mother: Firuza Sultan Begum
- Religion: Sunni Islam

Husayn Bayqara Mirza (Persian: سلطان حسین بایقرا Husayn Bāyqarā; June/July 1438 – 4 May 1506) was the Timurid ruler of Khurasan with his capital at Herat from 1469 until 4 May 4 1506, with a brief interruption in 1470.

A skilled statesman, Husayn Bayqara was best known for his interest in the arts and was renowned as a benefactor and patron of learning in his kingdom, with his reign being heralded as the second Timurid Renaissance. He has been described as "the quintessential Timurid ruler of the later period in Transoxiana" and his sophisticated court and generous artistic patronage was a source of admiration, particularly from his cousin, the Mughal emperor Babur. Sultan Husayn Bayqara was the last Timurid ruler of consequence in Khurasan.

== Early life and lineage ==
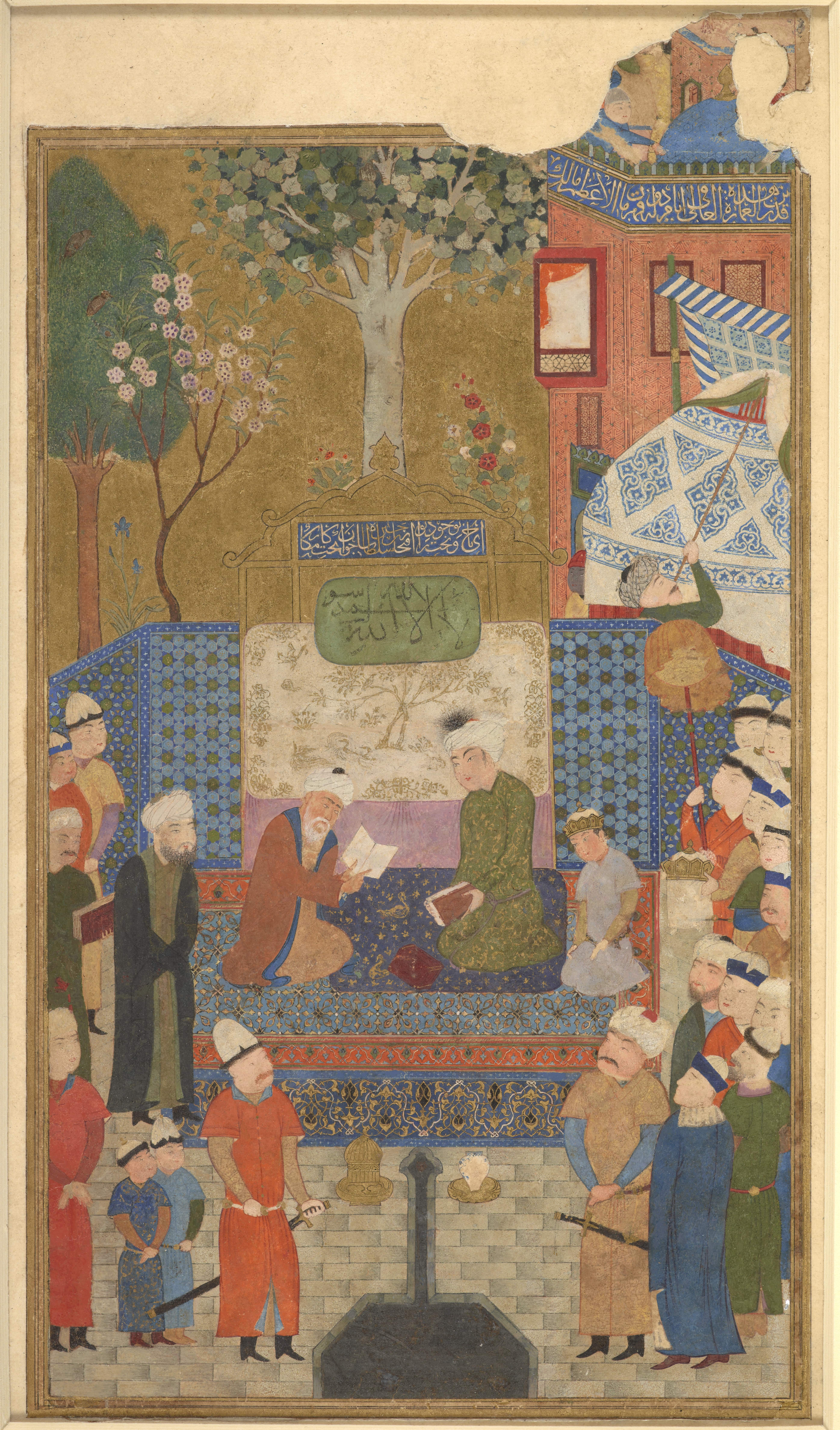
Coronation of Sultan Husayn Bayqara (attributed to Mansur). Kneeling on a throne inscribed with his name, the ruler is accompanied by his son Badi al-Zaman. To the right, an attendant carries a gold crown, while another shields it with a small, gold parasol. Both objects were the most important attributes of kingship in the Timurid era. Herat, c. 1469. Art and History Collection

Born in Herat in June or July 1438, Husayn Bayqara's parents were Ghiyas ud-din Mansur Mirza of the Turco-Mongol Barlas tribe and his wife, Firuza Sultan Begum. His parents had four other children; a son, Bayqara Mirza II, as well as three daughters, Aka Biki, Badi al-Jamal and Urun Sultan Khanum.

Husayn's father was a great-grandson of the Central Asian conqueror Timur. His mother was the daughter of Sultan Husayn of the powerful Tayichiud tribe, for whom he was named. Firuza was also herself a great-granddaughter of Timur twice over. Both his parents were also descendants of the Mongol emperor, Genghis Khan. In addition to this, he claimed descent in the ninth generation from Khwaja Abdullah Ansari of Herat, also known as Pir-e-Herat ('Sage of Herat').

Husayn's father Ghiyas ud-din died when he was 7 or 8 years old. Given that the latter was not a noteworthy personality in the Timurid family, Husayn adopted the name Bayqara after his more illustrious grandfather, Bayqara Mirza I. After consulting with his mother, Husayn Bayqara entered the service of his older cousin, Abul-Qasim Babur Mirza, ruler of Herat in 1452. Abul-Qasim Babur Mirza was considered an incompetent ruler. He mismanaged his territory and went into battle against Abu Sa'id Mirza, the Timurid ruler of Samarkand. Husayn Bayqara, not happy with his employment, tried to go over to Abu Sa'id Mirza by meeting with him. Although Abu Sa'id was inclined to take him into his service, a rebellion on part of Husayn Bayqara's relative, Sultan Awais Mirza, son of Muhammad Mirza, son of Bayqara Mirza, induced Abu Sa'id to arrest Husayn Bayqara and other relatives as a precaution. Eventually on the plea of his mother, Firuza Begum, he was freed and he rejoined Abul-Qasim Babur Mirza till the latter's death two years later.

== Period of anarchy in Khurasan ==
Following Babur's death in 1457, a period of anarchy ensued in Khurasan. Economic instability and lack of central authority with frequent regime changes invited the invasion of the region by the ruler of Samarkand, Abu Sa'id Mirza who occupied Herat on July 19, 1457. But Abu Sa'id Mirza immediately abandoned the city in order to deal with troubles at home. Next came the invasion of the Kara Koyunlu leader, Jahan Shah who took Mazandaran. During this chaotic time Khurasan was divided into many territories;

- Asterabad to Sabzevar – Jahan Shah of Kara Koyunlu
- Balkh – Abu Sa'id Mirza, ruler of Transoxiana
- Abivard – Ala al-Dawla Mirza
- Herat – Ibrahim Mirza
- Tus and Imad – Shah Mahmud Mirza
- Marv – Sultan Sanjar Mirza
- Sistan, Farah and Isfizar – Malik Qasim ibn Amir Iskander Turkmen, an Amir.

== In Merv and Khwarazm ==
Husayn Bayqara, unable to compete with these rivals, adopted the life of a mercenary and joined Sultan Sanjar Mirza of Merv who married him to his daughter, Beqa Sultan Begum. To them was born Badi' al-Zaman Mirza.

Sultan Sanjar Mirza and Husayn Bayqara got along well, but in June/July 1457 when Sanjar appointed Husayn in charge of the city while he was absent, Husayn tried to take power. This was due to him suspecting that the chief dignitary, Hasan Arlat was plotting to kill him. Amirs loyal to Sanjar revolted and the attempt failed. Husayn Bayqara was forced to escape with just five horsemen. But outside the city he was joined by the head of security of trade caravans of Iranji sector, Hasan Charkas and his 200 men. This would become Husayn Bayqara's first mercenary force. To solidify this new relationship, he married Hasan Charkas' daughter, Afāk Begum.

He was chased by Sanjar Mirza to Karakum Desert. He was continuously pursued until he was forced to march towards Khwarazm, where he remained between the deserts of Merv and Khiva.

== Timurid-Kara Koyunlu conflict ==
Recognizing the weakness of Timurid authority in Herat, Jahan Shah invaded and took the city on June 28, 1458, which was now occupied by Ibrahim Mirza's father, Ala al-Dawla Mirza. But Abu Sa'id Mirza could not tolerate this and after negotiations, Jahan Shah decided to return territorial demarcation to Shah Rukh's times. Thus, Khurasan, Mazandaran and Jurjan were returned to the Timurids and Abu Sa'id Mirza returned and took Herat a second time on December 22, 1458.

== Conflict with Abu Sa'id Mirza ==
Husayn Bayqara had now mustered a force of 1,000 men and took Jurjan on October 19, 1458 from the Kara Koyunlu. Abu Sa'id Mirza invaded Jurjan, which Husayn Bayqara hastily abandoned and fled towards Khwarazm again. Abu Sa'id Mirza appointed his son, Sultan Mahmud Mirza as Jurjan's governor. When Husayn Bayqara learned that Abu Sa'id Mirza had left Herat to crush the rebellion of his relative Muhammad Juki, he attacked Jurjan again and at the Battle of Jauzi Wali in May 1461, he defeated Sultan Mahmud Mirza and appointed Abdal-Rahman Arghun the territory's governor.

However, he could not follow up this victory when he besieged Herat from August–October 1461. Abu Sa'id Mirza returned and Husayn Bayqara again fled towards Khwarazm, from where he began making pillaging raids into Khurasan; these raids were conducted in earnest starting in 1464. Seeking to protect himself against Abu Sa'id, he requested the help of the Uzbeks. But that help never came since Abul-Khayr Khan, the Uzbek leader died in 1468. This period of 8 to 10 years was the worst in Husayn Bayqara's life. He wandered from one place to the next at times in dire straits.

== Becoming ruler of Khurasan ==
When Abu Sa'id Mirza went to war against the Aq Qoyunlu, he was defeated at the Battle of Qarabagh and captured. The leader of the Aq Qoyunlu, Uzun Hasan handed him over to the 19-year-old Timurid Yadgar Muhammad Mirza, who had him executed. Upon Abu Sa'ids death, the Timurid Empire collapsed. Taking advantage of Abu Sa'id Mirza's absence, Husayn Bayqara had again entered Khurasan and besieged Herat which he finally captured on March 24, 1469. Thus he became the ruler of Khurasan. The sons of the late Abu Sa'id Mirza attempted to march against him, but turned back when they learned that not only had Husayn Bayqara consolidated his control over the city, but the defeated army of their father had joined him.

== Conflict with Aq Qoyunlu and Yadgar Muhammad Mirza ==
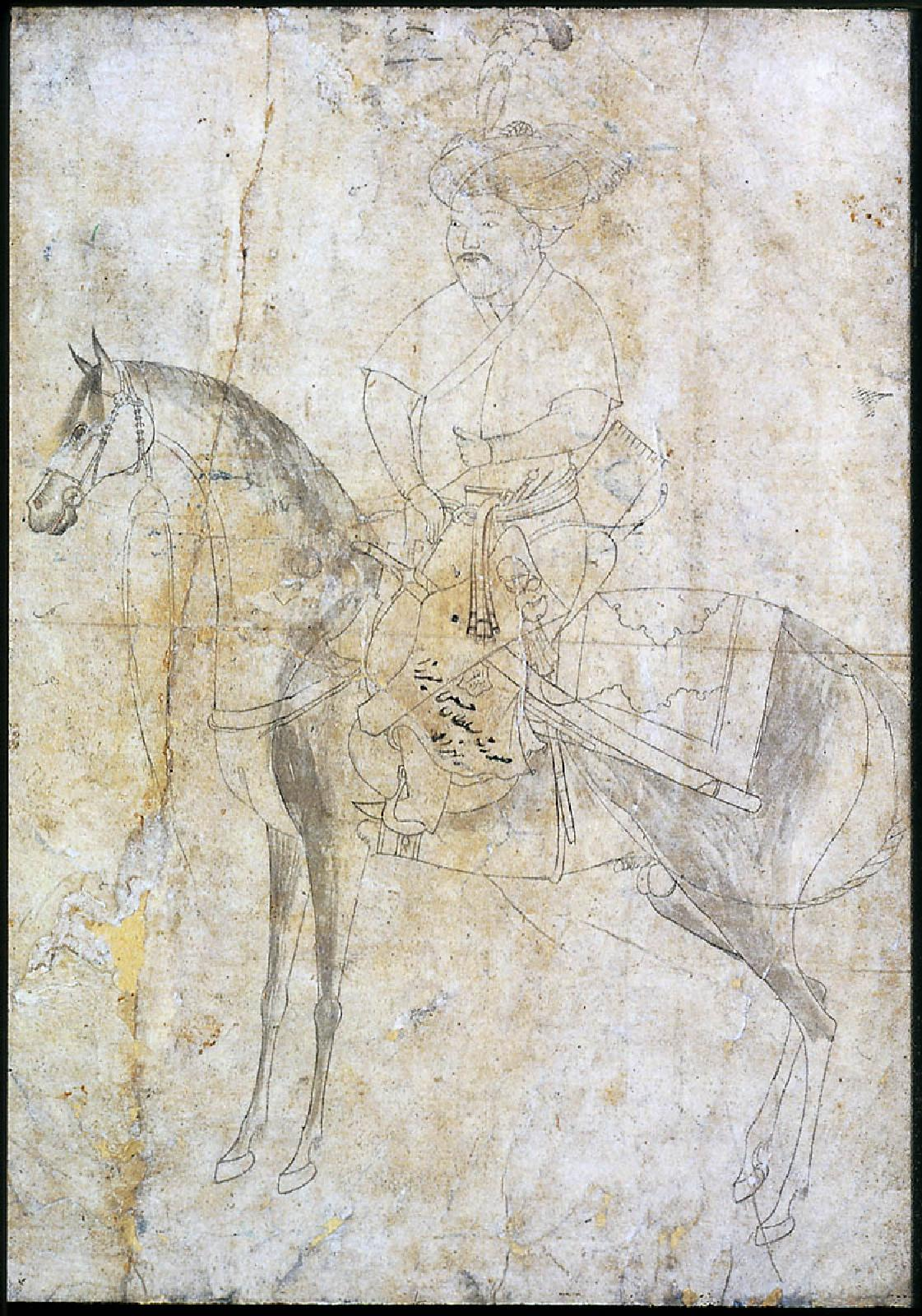
Sultan Husayn Mirza on horse, by Bihzad.

Meanwhile, Uzun Hasan sent his protege, Yadgar Muhammad Mirza, to conquer Khurasan. Husayn defeated Yadgar at the Battle of Chenaran on September 15, 1469, but the latter was sent reinforcements. Uzun Hasan demanded that Husayn hand over various Kara Koyunlu officials who had fled to him, a demand which Husayn refused. Yadgar therefore continued his assault, and Husayn was unable to match his forces due to mass desertions. He ended up fleeing Herat, which was occupied on July 7, 1470. Six weeks later, Husayn reoccupied the city after Abu Sa'id fended off the attack of some of his sons and his forces and defeated the Aq Qoyunlu Turkmens, He gathered his forces and defeated the Aq Qoyunlu Turkmens again and killed an Emir of Uzun Hasan, who were trying to advance into the region. so much so that Husayn defeated the Aq Qoyunlu Turkmens with only 850 Soldiers In the Marghab River, Husayn who were attempting to advance into the region. Afterwards Husayn captured Yadgar scolded him for collaborating with the Aq Qoyunlu Turkmens and the leaders Uzun Hasan. and executed him. Aq Qoyunlu Turkmens scared fled the Khorasan when they hear about the execution.

Husayn's empire was now secure. The Aq Qoyunlu made no further attempts against him, and the Timurids in Transoxiana were too weakened by internal conflicts to advance into his territory. His boundary with the Aq Qoyunlu started on the southern edge of the Caspian Sea, running south, then east across the north of the Dasht-e Lut, ending at Lake Hamun. His border with the Timurids was the Oxus River. He more or less respected both borders, refusing to cross north in an attempt to capture Transoxiana from his former enemies. He was probably aware of the Uzbek threat to the region, and was wise enough not to pursue a border with this dangerous tribal people.

== Administration ==
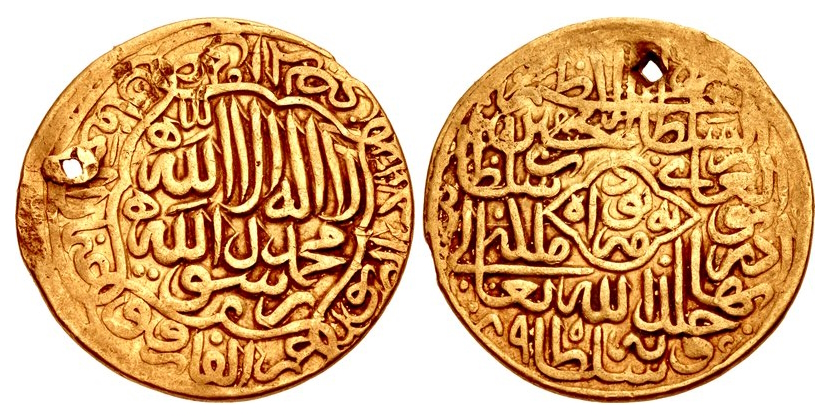
Coinage of Sultan Husayn. Herat mint. Dated AH 895 (1489-90)

Husayn was viewed as "a good king, a lover of peace and justice", and he built numerous structures including a famous school; however, he was sick with a palsy for twenty years of his reign. He was forced to deal with several revolts and incursions. In 1490 the brother of Husayn's son Ibrahim Husain's guardian, Darvish 'Ali, conspired with Sultan Mahmud, who by that time ruled in Hisar. Mahmud moved against Balkh, which Ibrahim resided in, forcing Husayn to mobilize against him. Some years later, Husayn transferred his eldest son, Badi' al-Zaman, from Astarabad (renamed Gorgan in 1937) to Balkh, but Badi' revolted when his son Muhammed Mu'min was denied rule in Astarabad. Husayn defeated both Muhammed, whom he executed, and Badi', whom he reconciled with. The truce fell apart afterwards, however, and in 1499 Badi' besieged Herat.

Husayn Bayqara introduced a ban on the drinking of wine and the shaving of beards. He said that “Although in the days of some [other rulers], the principles of the Sharia and the community of Islam were at the mercy of heretics ... (in his time) the arms of the Holy Law and the laws of the Prophet are so strong that...." going on to boast about how his police maintained morality.

== Culture ==
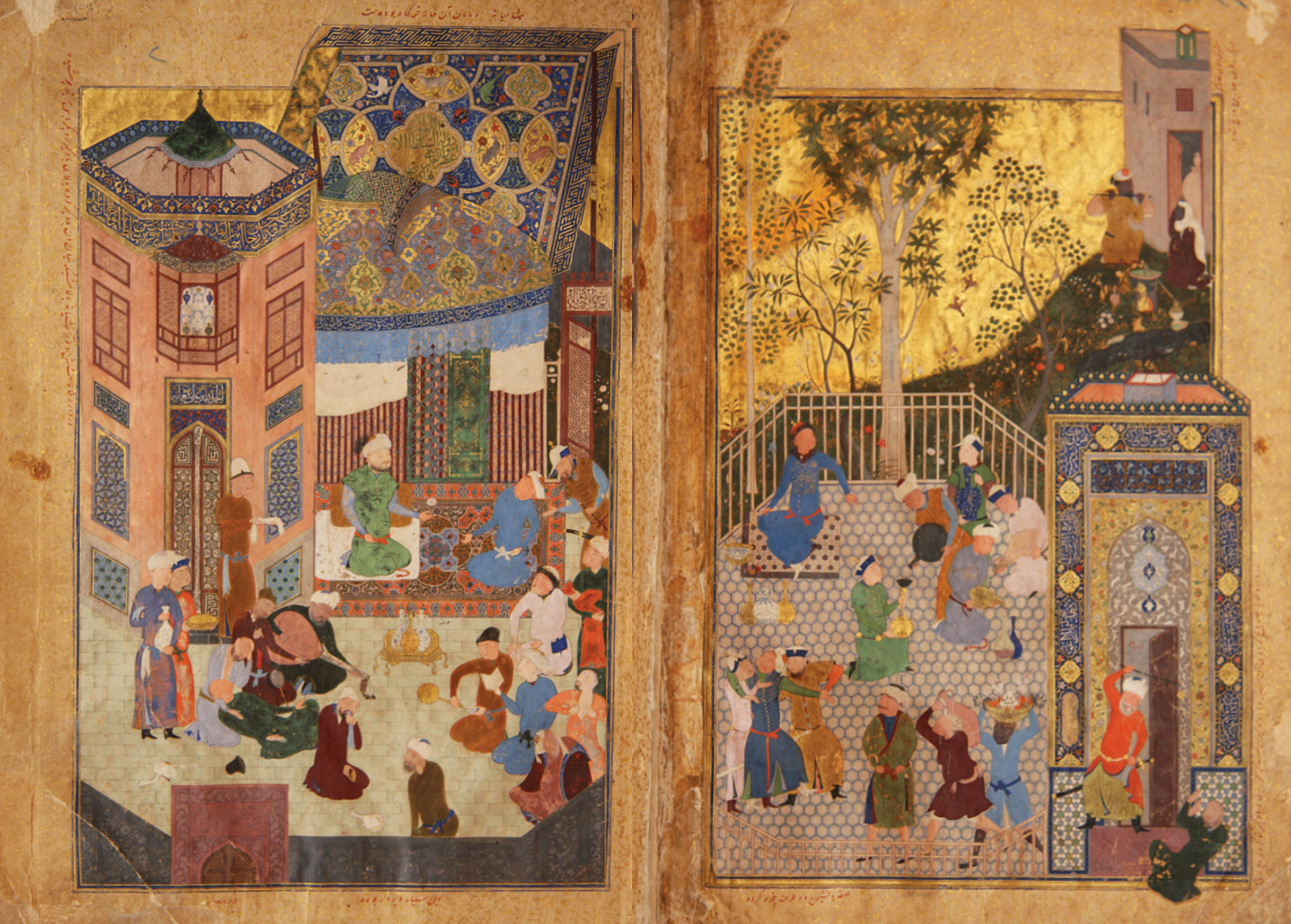
Frontispiece from the Cairo Bustan, depicting Sultan Husayn Bayqara and his court. Herat, c. 1488

Husayn Bayqara was notably a patron of arts and literature, particularly of poets, which led to the blossom of literal culture in Herat. The leading poets of the court were Jami (died 1492) and Ali-Shir Nava'i (died 1501). The former is acknowledged as the last of the great classical Persian poets, while the latter is renowned for being the founder of Chagatai Turkic literature. Under Husayn Bayqara, the amalgation of the cultural sphere of the Turks and Persians reached its zenith, as demonstrated by his support and involvement in the literary culture of both languages. Regardless, Persian remained the dominant language of realm.

For a time, early in his reign, he was disposed to making Shi'ism the religion of the state but was dissuaded from this.

=== Architecture ===
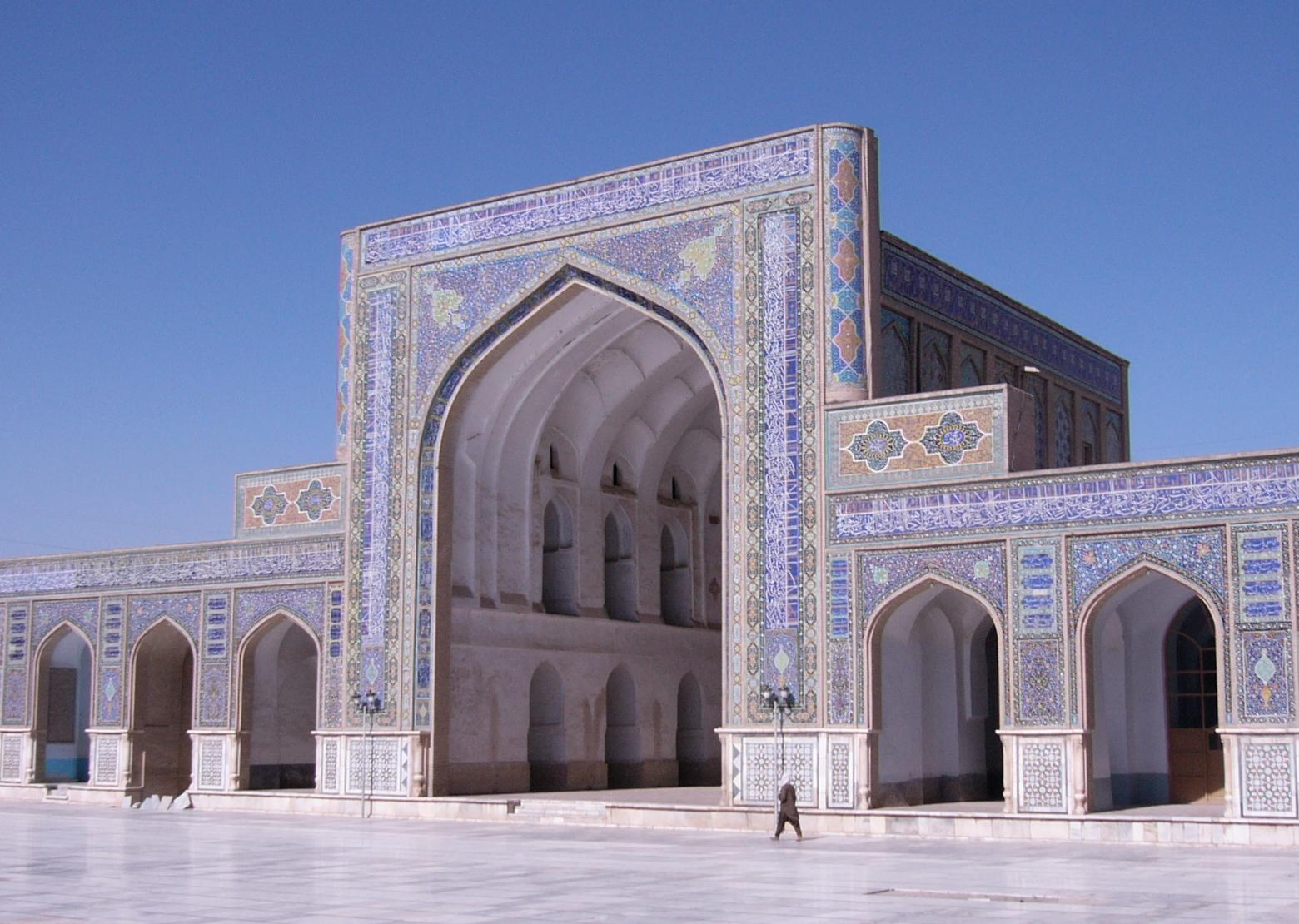
Under Sultan Husayn Bayqara, the Great Mosque of Herat reached its "period of greatest magnificence", with decorations abounding in Timurid features.

Husayn Bayqara was highly involved in architectural pursuit. His rule saw an "explosion of architecture": about half of all known Timurid building endeavours (constructions, renovations, expansions...) were accomplished during his reign, through himself directly or through his family members or officials, mostly in the area of Herat. He built a madrasa and a mausoleum in the Musalla complex, Herat, where he was buried. Under his sponsorship the Great Mosque of Herat reached its "period of greatest magnificence", with decorations abounding in Timurid features. In Herat, he built his own palace, Bāḡ-e Jahān-ārā.

== Uzbek threat and death ==
In 1501 the Uzbeks conquered Transoxiana from Abu Sa'id's grandson, Babur. Under Muhammad Shaybani, the Uzbeks could now threaten Khurasan. Suffering from the effects of advanced age, Husayn made no move against them, even after Babur advised him to act. The Uzbeks began conducting raids into his kingdom. Finally changing his mind, he began to march against them but died in 1506 just after beginning his advance.

The inheritance of his empire was disputed between his sons Badi' al-Zaman and Muzaffar Husain. Babur, who had begun an expedition in support of Husayn, noted the infighting between the brothers, decided the area was impossible to defend and retreated. The next year, Muhammad Shaybani conquered Herat and caused Husayn's successors to flee, putting an end to Timurid rule in Khurasan.

== Family ==
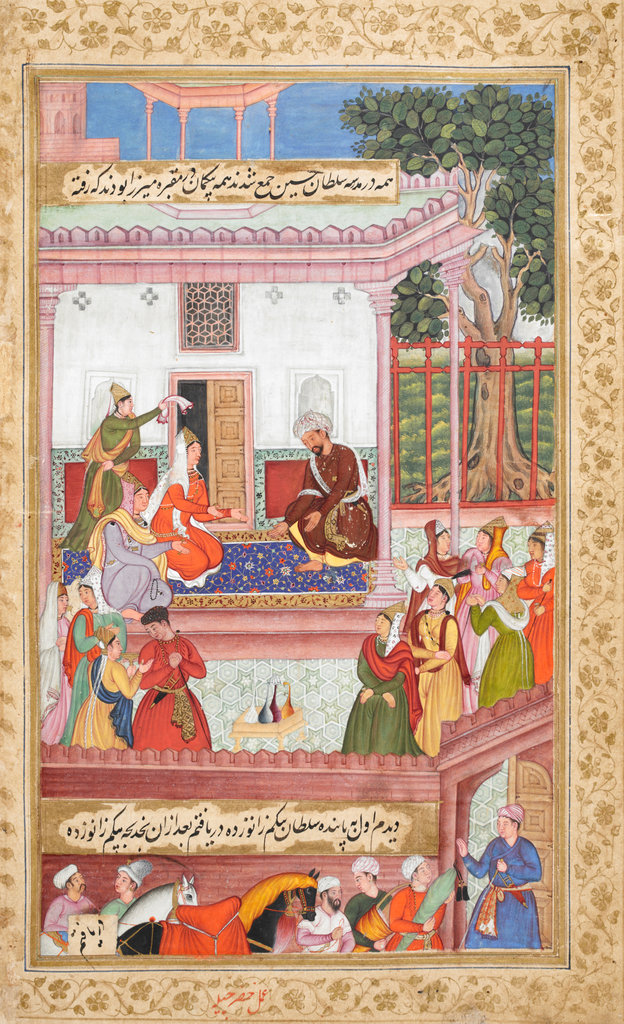
Babur visiting Sultan Husayn Bayqara’s mausoleum at the Musalla complex in Herat in 1506, soon after his death. Baburnama (1590).

Consorts

Husayn had twelve consorts (wives and concubines):

- Bega Sultan Begum (m. 1457 - div., died 1488), daughter of Sanjar Mirza of Merv, son of Mirak Ahmad Mirza, son of Umar Shaikh Mirza, son of Timur;
- Tulak Begum known as Chuli Begum (div.), daughter of Husayn Sufi, a chief of the Azaks, and sister of Amir Yusuf Sufi Jandar;
- Shahr Banu Begum (m. 1469 - div.), daughter of Sultan Abu Sa'id Mirza;
- Payanda Sultan Begum, another daughter of Sultan Abu Sa'id Mirza;
- Khadija Begi Agha, daughter of Amir Muhammad Sarik bin Amir Muhammad Khawaja, and widow of Abu Sa'id Mirza;
- Zainab Sultan Begum, daughter of Amir Taj-al-din Hasan bin Nizam-al-din Charkas;
- Afak Begum, another daughter of Amir Taj-al-din Hasan bin Nizam-al-din Charkas;
- Zobayda Sultan Aghacha, daughter of Hasan bin Hussain Sheikh Taimur, of the race of the Shaban Sultans;
- Latifa Sultan Aghacha, daughter of Amir Sultan Husayn Chaharshanba and a relative of Jahan Shah;
- Mangeli Bi Aghacha, an Uzbek concubine, and former slave girl of Shahar Banu Begum;
- Baba Aghacha, daughter of Khawaja Muhammad Ataka, and foster sister of Afak Begum;
- Begi Sultan Aghacha, a concubine, and mother of Afrasiyab Mirza;

Sons

Husayn had eighteen sons:

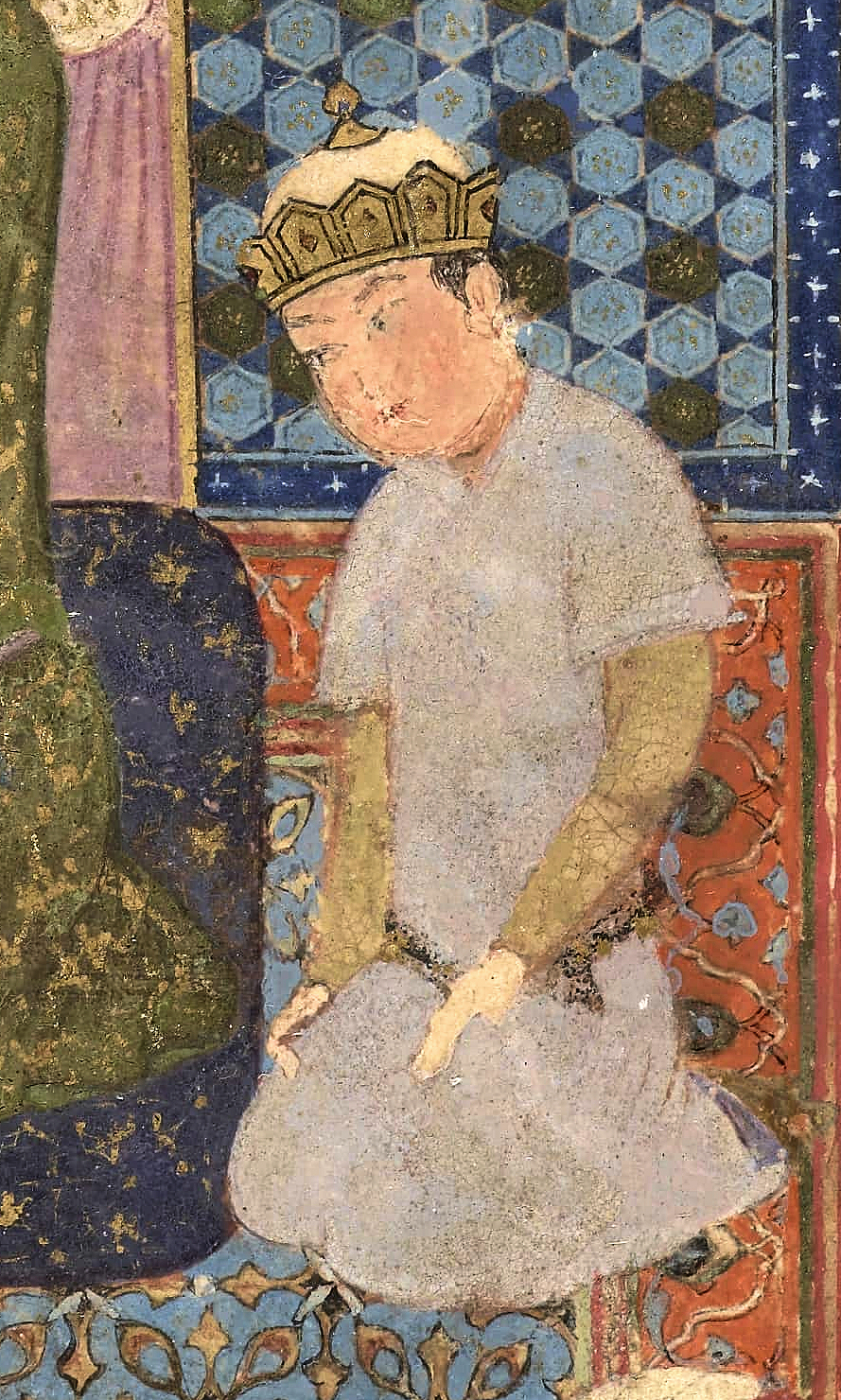
Contemporary portrait of Prince Badi' al-Zaman Mirza at the coronation of his father Sultan Husayn Bayqara in Herat in 1469 (age 10).

- Badi' al-Zaman Mirza — with Bega Sultan Begum;
- Shah Gharib Mirza — with Khadija Begi Agha;
- Muzaffer Hussain Mirza — with Khadija Begi Agha;
- Abul Hassan Mirza — with Latifa Sultan Aghacha;
- Muhammad Muhsin Mirza — with Latifa Sultan Aghacha;
- Abu Tarab Mirza — with Mangeli Bi Aghacha;
- Muhammad Hussain Mirza — with Mangeli Bi Aghacha;
- Feridun Hussain Mirza — with Mangeli Bi Aghacha;
- Haidar Muhammad Mirza — with Payanda Sultan Begum;
- Muhammad Ma'asum Mirza — with Baba Aghacha;
- Farrukh Hussain Mirza — with Baba Aghacha;
- Ibrahim Hussain Mirza — with Baba Aghacha;
- Ibn Hussain Mirza - with Baba Aghacha;
- Muhammad Qasim Mirza — with Baba Aghacha;
- Afrasiyab Mirza — with Begi Sultan Aghacha;
- Masum Ali Mirza - Latifa Sultan Aghacha;
- Sultan Jahangir Mirza — with Khadija Begi Agha;
- Jahangir Husain Mirza — with Khadija Begi Agha;

Daughters

Husayn had eighteen daughters:

- Zainab Sultan Begum known as Sultanim Begum - with Tulak Begum, married firstly to Sultan Wayis Mirza, son of Bayqara Mirza II and Sa'adat Bakht Begum, married secondly to Abdul Baqi Mirza, son of Usman Mirza, son of Sidi Ahmad Mirza, son of Miran Shah;
- Ak Begum - with Payanda Sultan Begum, married to Muhammad Qasim Mirza, son of Abu'l-Qasim Arlat and Bega Begum;
- Kechek Begum - with Payanda Sultan Begum, married to Mullah Khwajah;
- Bega Begum - with Payanda Sultan Begum, married to Babar Mirza, son of Muhammad Qasim Mirza and Rabia Sultan Begum;
- Agha Begum - with Payanda Sultan Begum, married to Sultan Murad Mirza, son of Muhammad Qasim Mirza and Rabia Sultan Begum;
- Fatima Sultan Begum - with Mengli Bi Aghach, married to Yadgar Farrukh Mirza, son of Farrukhzad Mirza, son of Sidi Ahmad Mirza, son of Miran Shah;
- Maryam Sultan Begum - with Mengli Bi Aghacha, married to Sayyid Abdullah Mirza;
- Sultan Nizhad Begum - with Baba Aghacha, married to Iskandar Mirza, son of Bayqara Mirza and Sa'adat Bakht Begum;
- Sa'adat Bakht Begum known as Begum Sultan - with Baba Aghacha, married to Sultan Masud Mirza, son of Sultan Mahmud Mirza and Khanzada Begum;
- Munawar Sultan Begum - with Baba Aghacha, married to Sayyid Mirza of Andekhud, descendant of Ulugh Beg;
- Aisha Sultan Begum - with Zobayda Sultan Aghacha, married firstly to Qasim Sultan, a Shaibani Sultan, married secondly to Buran Sultan, a relative of Qasim;
- Khanum Sultan Begum - with Khadija Begi Agha;
- Sa'adat Nizhad Begum - with Baba Aghacha;
- Salima Sultan Begum - with Baba Aghacha;
- Badi-al-Mulk Begum - with Latifa Sultan Aghacha;
- Umm Salima Begum - with Latifa Sultan Aghacha;
- Munisa Sultan Begum - with Zubayda Sultan Aghacha;
- Khurshid Bakht Begum - with Baba Aghacha;

== Ancestry ==
Ancestors of Husayn Bayqara

16. Timur (= 26, 28)
8. Umar Shaikh Mirza I
17. Tolun Agha
4. Muhammad Bayqara I
18. Khizr Ughlan Chaghatay
9. Malikat Agha
2. Ghiyas ud-din Mansur Mirza
20. Amir Iskandar of the Eljigidey tribe
10. Ali
5. Qutlugh Sultan Begum
22. Kay-Khusrow, King of Khattalani
11. Bibi Fatima
23. Tuman Qutlugh Khanum (Granddaughter of Kebek Khan)
1. Sultan Husayn Bayqara
24. Amir Musa of the Tayichiud
12. Amir Muhammad Beg
6. Sultan Husayn Tayichiud
26. Timur (= 16, 28)
13. Aqa Begum
27. Turmish Agha
3. Firuza Sultan Begum
28. Timur (= 16, 26)
14. Miran Shah
29. Mengli Khatun
7. Qutlugh Sultan Begum
30 Suyurghatmish Khan, Khan of the Western Chagatai Khanate
15. Urun Sultan Khanum

== Sources ==
- Francis Robinson (2007). "The Mughal Emperors and the Islamic Dynasties of India, Iran and Central Asia". ISBN 978-0-500-25134-8
- Manz, Beatrice Forbes (2007). Power, Politics and Religion in Timurid Iran. Cambridge University Press. ISBN 978-1-139-46284-6.
- Peter Jackson (1986). The Cambridge History of Iran, Volume Six: The Timurid and Safavid Periods. ISBN 0-521-20094-6
- Roemer, Hans R. (2004). "Ḥosayn Bāyqarā". In Yarshater, Ehsan (ed.). Encyclopædia Iranica. Vol. XII/5: Homosexuality III–Human migration II. London and New York: Routledge & Kegan Paul. pp. 508–511. ISBN 978-0-933273-79-5.
- Subtelny, Maria (1988). "Centralizing Reform and Its Opponents in the Late Timurid Period". Iranian Studies. 21 (1/2): 129–151. doi:10.1080/00210868808701712. JSTOR 4310597. (registration required)
- Subtelny, Maria (2007). Timurids in Transition: Turko-Persian Politics and Acculturation in Medieval Iran, Volume 7. BRILL. ISBN 9789004160316.
- Woods, John E. (1990), The Timurid dynasty, Indiana University, Research Institute for Inner Asian Studies

Husayn Bayqara Timurid dynasty
Preceded by Yadigar Muhammad	Timurid Empire (in Herat); 1469–1506	Succeeded by Badi' al-Zaman
