= Badi' al-Zaman Mirza =

Timurid ruler of Herat (16th century AD)

Badi' al-Zaman
- Mirza
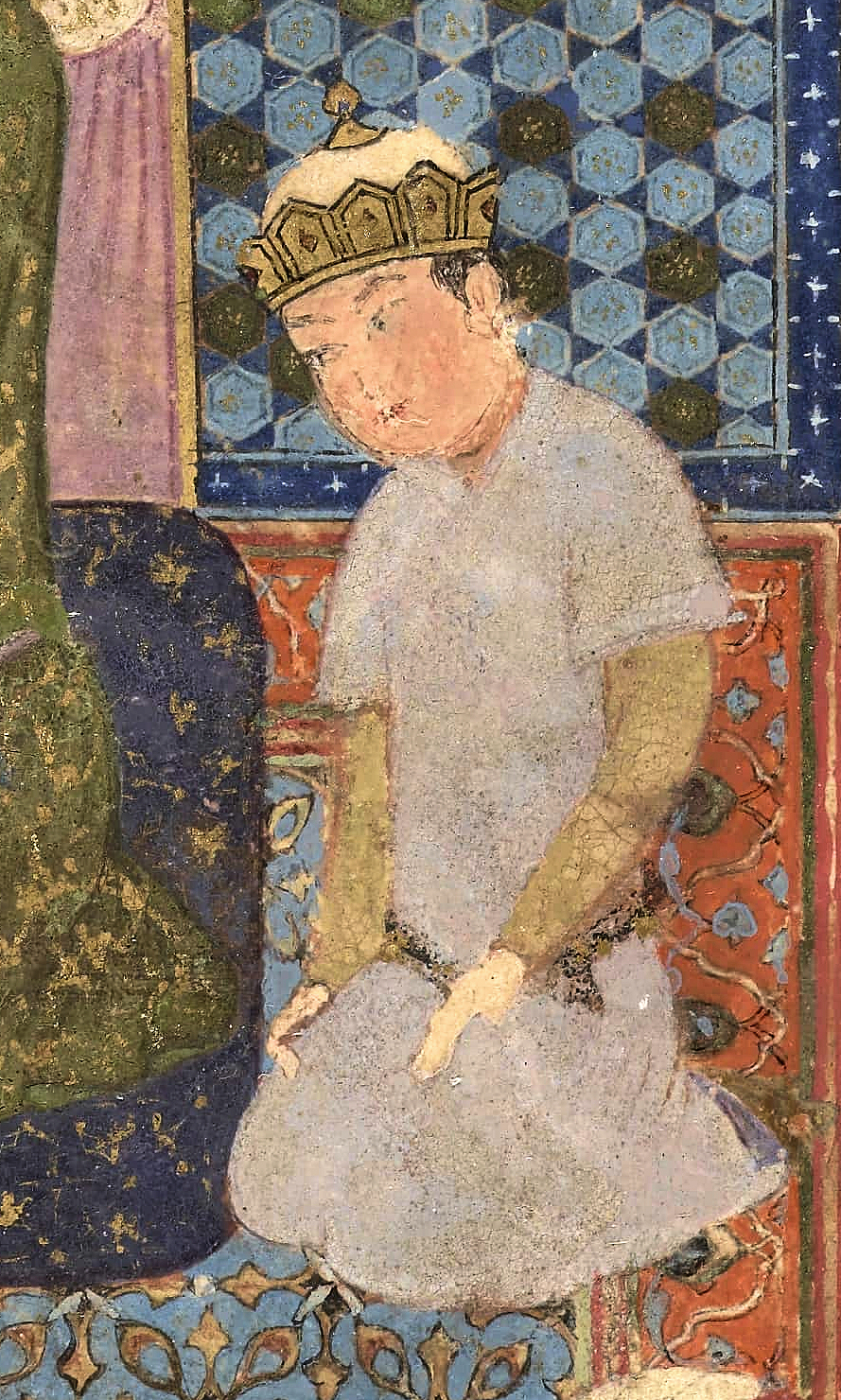
- Contemporary portrait of Prince Badi al-Zaman at the coronation of his father Sultan Husayn Bayqara in Herat in 1469 (age 10).

Amir of the Timurid Empire
- Reign: 4 May 1506–1507
- Predecessor: Sultan Husayn Mirza Bayqara
- Successor: position abolished of State Succeeded by Babur as a lineage
- Born: 1456; Herat, Timurid Empire
- Died: 1514 (aged 57-58); Constantinople, Ottoman Empire
- Spouse: Urun Sultan Khanum; Kabuli Begum; Ruqaiya Agha; Chuchak Begum; One other wife
- Issue: Muhammad Mumin Mirza; Muhammad Zaman Mirza; Kuchek Begum
- Dynasty: Timurid dynasty
- Father: Sultan Husayn Bayqara
- Mother: Bega Sultan Begum
- Religion: Sunni Islam

Badi' al-Zaman Mirza (Persian: بدیع‌الزمان‌ میرزا; died 1514) was the last Timurid ruler of Herat from 1506 to 1507. He was the son of Husayn Bayqarah, who was a great-great-grandson of Timur. He was the Timurid emperor from 1506 to 1507, after him his cousin Babur succeeding as only surviving Timurid ruler at Kabul and later in India and founding Mughal Dynasty.

== Biography ==
During the 1490s a conflict broke out between Badi' and his father. Husayn had transferred Badi' from his governorship in Astarabad, present day Gorgan, to Balkh, and then passed over Badi's son Muhammad Mu'min to replace him in Astarabad. Enraged by his father's decision, Badi' launched a rebellion. He was defeated, and around the same time his son, who had been imprisoned in Herat, was executed. Husayn made peace with his son Badi', but tension remained between the two, and in 1499 Badi' besieged Herat.

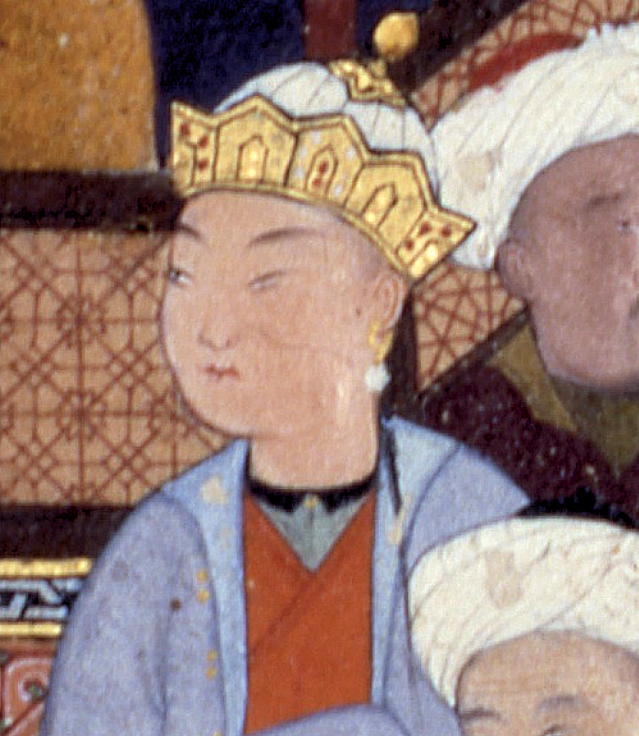
Likely portrait of Prince Badīʿ al-Zamān, Herat in 1486 (age 30).

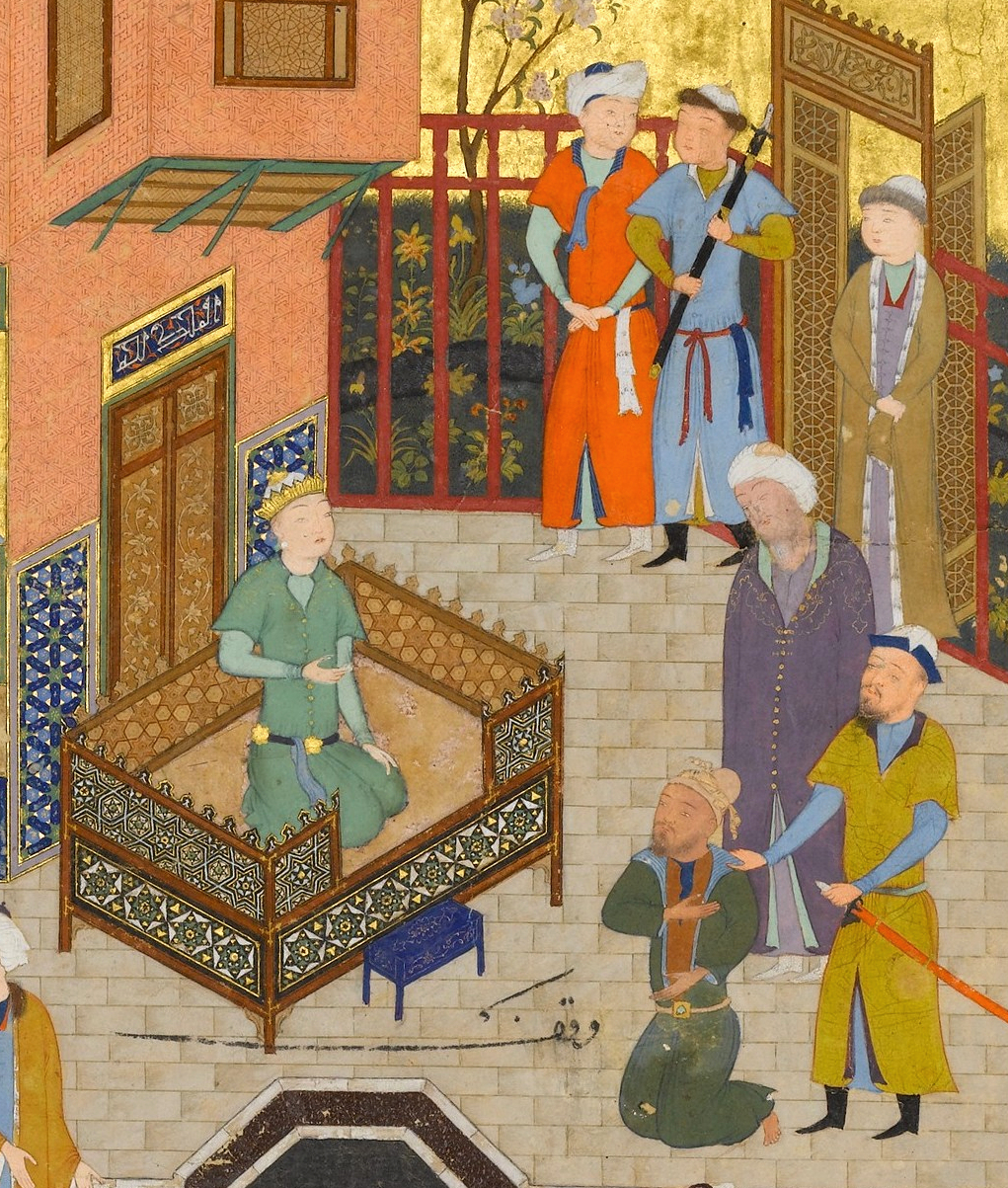
Young prince in a Timurid court scene in Herat in 1487. "The Beggar who Professed his Love for a Prince", Mantiq al-tair (Language of the Birds)

In 1506 his father Sultan-Husayn Bayqara died, and Badi' took the throne. However, he quickly became embroiled in a conflict with his brother Muzaffar Husain. In the midst of this, the Uzbeks under Muhammad Shaybani were threatening the realm.

=== Visit of Babur ===
Babur, who had marched from Kabul in an effort to assist Husayn, arrived in Herat and stayed there for a while, but noted the weakness of the brothers and left without making battle with the Uzbeks. In his Baburnama, Babur reccounts his stay in Herat, in particular a party held by Badi' al-Zaman Mirza in which he was offered delicate roast goose and was entertained to poetry recitals, music and dancing. The next year in 1507, the Uzbeks under Muhammad Shaybani captured Herat, bringing an end to Timurid rule there, and the brothers fled. Muzaffar died shortly after.

Badi' went to Kandahar to muster forces and marched against the Uzbeks, but was defeated. He then came to the court of Ismail I of Persia, where he was given lands surrounding Tabriz and 3650 gold shorafins a year. He helped influence Ismail's decision to undertake an expedition against the Uzbeks in 1510, in which Ismail killed Muhammad Shaybani.

In 1512 he lost a war against some small nations. Badi' stayed seven years at Tabriz until it was conquered by Ottoman sultan Selim I, at which point he travelled to Constantinople, where he died during the plague in 1514.

== Family ==
Badi' al-Zaman had five consorts:

- Urun Sultan Khanum, daughter of Sultan Abu Sa'id Mirza and Ruqaiya Sultan Begum, daughter of Ala al-Dawla Mirza bin Baysunghur bin Shah Rukh;
- Kabuli Begum (div. 1507), daughter of Ulugh Beg Mirza II, married by Qambar Mirza Kukaltash in 1507;
- Ruqaiya Agha, known as Andalib, a concubine, married by Timur Sultan Uzbeg, son of Muhammad Shaybani in 1507;
- Chuchak Begum (m. 1498), daughter of Zun Nun Arghun, and sister of Shah Shuja and Muhammad Muqim;
- A daughter of Tahamtan Beg, niece of Asad Beg, and mother of Muhammad Zaman Mirza;

Sons

Badi' al-Zaman had two sons:

- Muhammad Mumin Mirza - with Urun Sultan Khanum;
- Muhammad Zaman Mirza - with the daughter of Tahamtan Beg, married to Masuma Sultan Begum, daughter of Babur;

Daughter

Badi' al-Zaman had one daughter:

- Chuchak Begum known as Kuchek Begum (died April 1507) - with Chuchak Begum;

== Ancestry ==
Ancestors of Badi' al-Zaman Mirza

16. Umar Shaikh Mirza I (= 24)
8. Muhammad Bayqara I
17. Malikat Agha of Moghulistan (= 25)
4. Ghiyas ud-din Mansur Mirza
1. Ali of the Eljigidey tribe
9. Qutlugh Sultan Begum
19. Bibi Fatima of Khattalani
2. Sultan Husayn Mirza Bayqara
20. Amir Muhammad Beg of the Tayichiud
10. Sultan Husayn Tayichiud
21. Aqa Begum
5. Firuza Sultan Begum
22. Miran Shah
11. Qutlugh Sultan Begum
23. Urun Sultan Khanum of the Western Chagatai Khanate
1. Badi' al-Zaman Mirza
24. Umar Shaikh Mirza I (= 16)
12. Ahmad Mirza
25. Malikat Agha of Moghulistan (= 17)
6. Sanjar Mirza
26. Amir Sayf ud-din Nukuz
13. Taj al-Mulk
3. Bega Sultan Begum
7. Bakht Sultan

Badi' al-Zaman Mirza End of the Umarid Timurid dynasty
Preceded by Husayn Bayqarah	Timurid Empire (in Herat); 1506–1507	Succeeded by Muhammad Shaybani (as leader of the Khanate of Bukhara)
