= Babur Mirza's Invasion of Khorasan =

Timurid invasion of Khorasan (1448-1449)

- Part of the Timurid Civil Wars
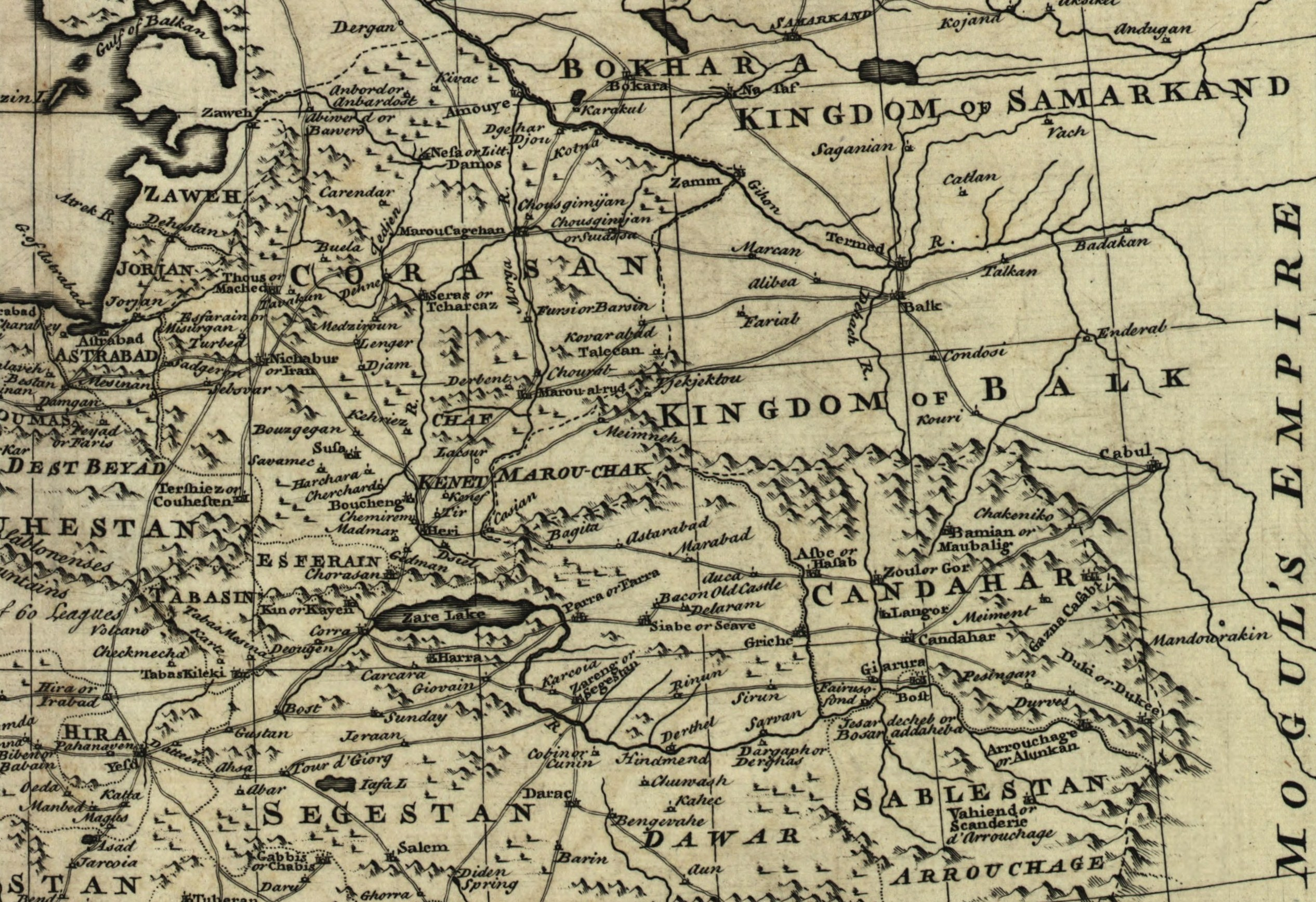
- Map of Khorasan
Date	Winter of 1448–1449
Location	Khurasan
Result	Timurids of Khorasan victory

Belligerents
Timurids of Khorasan	Timurids of Samarkand

Commanders and leaders
Abu'l-Qasim Babur Mirza; Ala al-Dawla Mirza; Khalil Hendugha	Ulugh Beg; Abdal-Latif Mirza; Yar Ali (POW) (executed)

Abul-Qasim Babur Mirza, a Timurid ruler in Khorasan, invaded other parts of the region in the winter of 1448–1449 that were held by the Timurids of Samarkand, led by Ulugh Beg. Abdul-Qasim Babur Mirza was victorious and ruled over the area until his death in 1457.

== Background ==
Babur Mirza was in possession of Jurjan and Mazandaran of Iran as well as Quchan in Khurasan in 1448 C.E. His brother Ala al-Dawla Mirza, after his defeat at the Battle of Tarnab, sought refuge with him at Quchan. Babur Mirza had been preparing for an invasion of Khurasan well before the invasion of Ulugh Beg in that region.

== Invasion ==
Babur waited until the winter of 1448 to make his move. Babur Mirza set out with his army towards Mashad which was abandoned by Abdal-Latif Mirza, who fled to join his father in Herat on the approach of his army. From there Babur marched towards Sarakhs.

Meanwhile, circumstances in Samarkand became serious while Ulugh Beg was away. The leader of the Uzbeks, Abul-Khayr Khan, had invaded Transoxiana and raided the suburbs of Samarkand. Ulugh Beg was at that time chasing after Ala al-Dawla Mirza and had reached Bistam and Pul-e-Ibrahim. With this invasion Ulugh Beg had no time to consolidate his control over Khurasan and he left for his beloved city of Samarkand with the body of Shahrukh Mirza leaving Abdal-Latif Mirza in charge of Herat.

On arrival at Sarakhs, Abul-Qasim Babur Mirza sent forces in two directions; one under the command of Khalil Hendugha in direction of Amu Darya to harass Ulugh Beg's forces and the other in direction of Herat. Hinduka attacked the baggage train of Ulugh Beg and captured Ibrahim, the son of Edigu-Timur (an Amir of Ulugh Beg). When Ulugh Beg was crossing the river Amu Darya, he was attacked and looted by the Uzbeks. He then rushed towards the city of Bukhara and stayed the winter there, and sent the body of Shahrukh Mirza ahead to Samarkand to be buried in Timur's mausoleum. Meanwhile, when the other forces of Abul-Qasim Babur Mirza moved towards Herat, Abdal-Latif Mirza abandoned the city and was crossed the Amu Darya when he received orders from Ulugh Beg to take his position in Balkh, which meant he could avoid seeing his father, whom Abdal-Latif Mirza faulted for not sending him reinforcements during the campaign.

After Abdal-Latif Mirza abandoned Herat, Yar Ali besieged the city and took it after three days. Finally, after 20 days, the army of Abul-Qasim Babur Mirza arrived and besieged the city yet again. Yar Ali was defeated and captured. He was immediately executed in the bazar of the city town center in February 1449. The city of Tūn was given over to Ala al-Dawla Mirza, but out of fear, jealousy or both, he had him arrested along with his son Ibrahim Mirza and imprisoned in Herat.

== Aftermath ==
The conquest of Khorasan in 1449 by Abul-Qasim Babur Mirza was decisive. Although, it was briefly taken by Sultan Muhammad Mirza, another brother of Abul-Qasim from Fars, in 1450; it remained in Abul-Qasim's hands until his death in 1457.
