= Battle of Nishapur (1447) =

Battle of the Timurid Civil Wars

- Part of the Timurid Civil Wars
Date	April 20, 1447
Location	Nishapur, Razavi Khorasan Province, Iran
Result	Timurids of Khurasan victory

Belligerents
Timurids of Khurasan	Timurids of Samarkand

Commanders and leaders
Unknown Amirs? Ala al-Dawla Mirza	Abdal-Latif Mirza

During the Second Timurid Succession Crisis, the sons of Baysunghur; Ala al-Dawla Mirza and Abul-Qasim Babur Mirza had acted in cognizance and blocked Abdal-Latif Mirza's chances of uniting with his father Ulugh Beg. Abul-Qasim Babur Mirza had taken Mazandaran and Jurjan whereas Ala al-Dawla Mirza had taken Mashad thereby surrounding Abdal-Latif Mirza at Nishapur.

On April 20, 1447, Ala al-Dawla Mirza's army surprised and attacked the city of Nishapur. Abdal-Latif Mirza was defeated and imprisoned whereas, Gawhar Shad and the Tarkhans were freed. They then marched towards Sadabad, Nishapur where Ala al-Dawla Mirza met Gawhar Shad and together they marched with the army towards Herat. At Herat, Abdal-Latif Mirza was kept in the fort of Iktiyar-al-Din. The army of Khurasan now marched against Ulugh Beg towards Samarkand.

== Aftermath ==
But when Ala al-Dawla Mirza reached Murghab he received news of the betrayal of his brother Abul-Qasim Babur Mirza who was marching forward to take Herat. At that moment arrived Ulugh Beg's envoy Sadr Nizam-al-Din Mirak Mahmud who conveyed to Ala al-Dawla Mirza a message of peace and a treaty was concluded whereby Chechektu valley (east of Murghab River) was the limit of Ala al-Dawla Mirza's territory and of the Murghab basin his North-western limit. Abdal-Latif Mirza was released as a part of the treaty and was now appointed governor of Balkh by his father. Ala al-Dawla Mirza then turned his attention towards his renegade brother Abul-Qasim Babur Mirza whom he managed to stave off by making another territorial treaty with him settling Quchan as the border between them.
