= Qutb al-Din Ta'us Simnani =

Qutb al-Din Ta'us Simnani (fl. 15th century) was a Persian bureaucrat who served as the vizier of the Timurid rulers Abul-Qasim Babur Mirza and Abu Sa'id Mirza. He traced his descent back to two prominent families of Simnan; from his maternal side he was a descendant of the Balich, and from his paternal side the Bahrami.

== Sources ==
- Manz, Beatrice Forbes (2007). Power, Politics and Religion in Timurid Iran. Cambridge University Press. ISBN 978-1-139-46284-6.
- Subtelny, Maria (2007). Timurids in Transition: Turko-Persian Politics and Acculturation in Medieval Iran. Brill. ISBN 978-90-04-16031-6.
