= Ibrahim Mirza (Timurid) =

Timurid ruler of Herat (15th century AD)

Mirza Ibrahim

Sultan of the Timurid Empire in Herat
- Reign: 1457 – 1459
- Predecessor: Mirza Shah Mahmud
- Successor: Abu Sa'id Mirza
- Born: 1440; Herat, Timurid Empire
- Died: 1459 (aged 18–19); Herat, Timurid Empire
- Burial: Gawhar Shad Mausoleum, Herat
- Religion: Sunni Islam (Hanafi)

Mirza Ibrahim (1440–1459) was a Timurid ruler of Herat in the fifteenth century. He was the son of Ala al-Dawla Mirza, a great-grandson of Timur.

Ibrahim came to power in Herat in the aftermath of the death of Abul-Qasim Babur Mirza. Babur's son Mirza Shah Mahmud had succeeded him but, as he was still a boy, his hold on power was weak. Ibrahim overthrew Shah Mahmud weeks after Babur's death and therefore became the ruler of Khurasan.

Following the defeat of Shah Mahmud, Wajih al-Din Isma'il joined forces with Mirza Ibrahim, but was later imprisoned and tortured to death.

In July 1457, the Timurid ruler of Transoxiana, Abu Sa'id Mirza, invaded. Abu Sa'id occupied Balkh but was unable to conquer Herat. Soon after Jahan Shah of the Black Sheep Turkmen invaded as well and after occupying Gurgan, defeated Ibrahim outside Astarabad. Ibrahim's father Ala al-Dawla Mirza met up with him in Herat to offer assistance, but in the end they both fled from the region. Jahan Shah entered Herat on June 28, 1458 but soon withdrew. Ibrahim was not able to recover his realm; Khurasan instead fell to Abu Sa'id Mirza.

Shortly after, Ibrahim and Ala al-Dawla Mirza formed an alliance with Sultan Sanjar Mirza (a grandson of Timur's son 'Umar Shaikh) against Abu Sa'id Mirza. The opposing forces met during the Battle of Sarakhs in March 1459, where Abu Sa'id defeated them. Ibrahim and his father fled, while Sultan Sanjar Mirza was executed. Ibrahim died only a few months later; his father died the following year.

== Ancestry ==
Ancestors of Ibrahim Mirza (Timurid)

8. Shah Rukh, Timurid Emperor
4. Ghiyath ud-din Baysunghur
9. Gawhar Shad
2. Ala al-Dawla Mirza
10. Amir Chulpan Qauchin
5. Jan Malik
1. Ibrahim Mirza
6. Barat Khwaja Bakshi
3. Murad Sultan Agha

Ibrahim Mirza (Timurid) Timurid dynasty
Preceded by Mirza Shah Mahmud	Timurid Empire (in Herat); 1457-1459	Succeeded by Interregnum (Black Sheep), then Abu Sa'id Mirza
