= Siege of Shahrukhiya =

Battle of the Timurid Civil Wars

- Part of Timurid Civil Wars
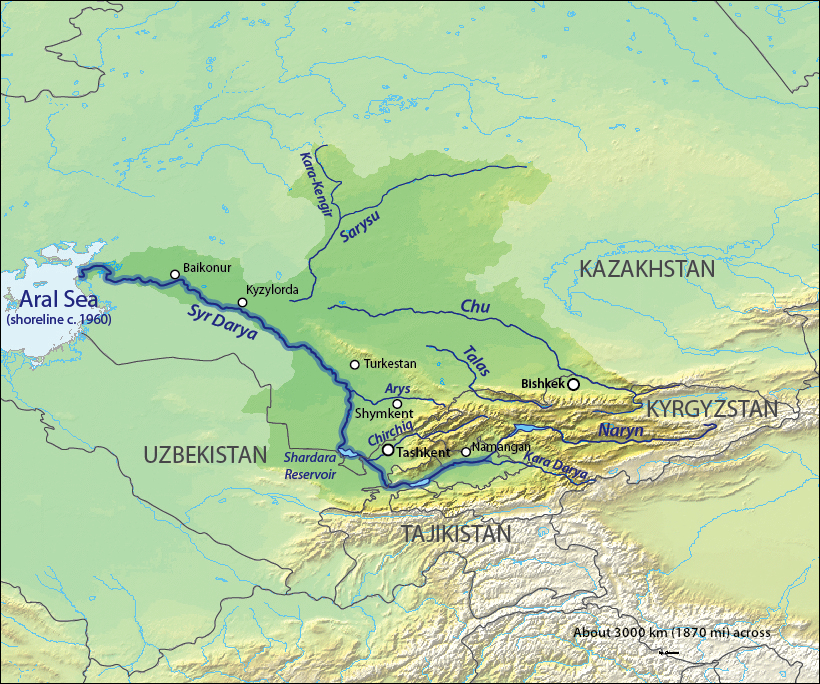
- Syrdarya
Date	1st siege 1461; 2nd siege 1462- Autumn, 1463
Location	Shahrukhiya, on the eastside of Syrdarya, Uzbekistan
Result	Decisive Timurids of Samarkand victory

Belligerents
Timurids of Shahrukhiya (Uzbekistan) Uzbek Confederates	Timurids of Samarkand

Commanders and leaders
Juki Mirza (POW); Burke Sultan	Abu Sa'id Mirza

Abu Sa'id Mirza occupied Herat on July 19, 1457. But he had to immediately abandon the city in order to deal with the Balkh revolt by the sons of Abdal-Latif Mirza, one of whom he killed in battle while the other Juki Mirza escaped to the steppes in the north under the protection of Abul-Khayr Khan, the Khan of the Uzbek principality of Tura, a part of the empire of Desht-i Kipchak region that lies to the east of Ural Mountains.

Meanwhile, Sultan Husayn Mirza Bayqarah had mustered a force of 1,000 men and had taken Jurjan on October 19, 1458, from Kara Koyunlu. Sultan Husayn Mirza was just 20 years old. Abu Sa'id Mirza invaded Jurjan which Sultan Husayn Mirza hastily abandoned and fled towards Khwarazm again. Abu Sa'id Mirza appointed his son Sultan Mahmud Mirza as Jurjan's governor.

Around 1459–60, Juki Mirza received aid from Abul-Khayr Khan and his wife (a daughter of Ulugh Beg), an Uzbek army under Burke Sultan was sent in his support. Some of the late Ulugh Beg's troops also joined Juki Mirza. Before Abu Sa'id Mirza could join his army it was defeated and Juki Mirza advanced as far as Kufin. From there he invaded the Transoxiana up to Amu Darya. Abu Sa'id Mirza received intelligence of this and marched with his army out of Herat to face this threat.

When Sultan Husayn Mirza Bayqarah learned that Abu Sa'id Mirza had left Herat to crush the rebellion of his relative Juki Mirza, he attacked Jurjan again and at the Battle of Jauzi Wali in May, 1461 he defeated Sultan Mahmud Mirza and appointed Abdal-Rahman Arghun the territory's governor. He then besieged Herat from August–October, 1461.

Meanwhile, Abu Sa'id Mirza followed up the predatory Uzbek bands as well as Juki Mirza. On his approach the Uzbek horde retreated across the Syrdarya, while Juki Mirza was besieged at Shahrukhiya. But it was then Abu Sa'id Mirza received the bad news of the defeat of his son Sultan Mahmud Mirza by Sultan Husayn Mirza Bayqarah at the Battle of Jauzi Wali and that his beloved new capital Herat was now besieged. He speedily concluded a truce with Juki Mirza and marched towards Herat but before he arrived Sultan Husayn Mirza Bayqarah raised the siege. Abu Sa'id Mirza drove him out of his territories and following him into his own lands taking Jurjan and Mazandaran.

This success enabled Abu Sa'id Mirza to turn his undivided force to complete the destruction of Juki Mirza. He besieged that prince in Shahrukhiya, a strong and populous city on the Syrdarya, and after a siege of one year Khwaja Ubaydullah Ahrar negotiated a surrender. Abu Sa'id Mirza took the city and he spared its inhabitants. He treated his captor Juki Mirza with respect in Shahrukhiya and Samarkand. But in January 1464 he was transferred to Qila Ikhtiyar-al-Din in Herat where he died in that year.
