= Siege of Balkh =

The siege of Balkh can refer to one of these historical events:

- Siege of Bactra, by Seleucid Empire between 208 and 206 BC
- Siege of Balkh (1220), by Mongol Empire during Mongol invasion of the Khwarazmian Empire
- Siege of Balkh (1370), by Timur
- Siege of Balkh (1447), during the Timurid Civil Wars
- Siege of Balkh (1648), by Kazakh-Bukhara army
