= Sultan Sanjar Mirza =

Muiziddin Sultan Sanjar Mirza (1405–1459) was a Timurid prince. He was son of Mirza Ahmad bin Umar Shaykh bin Timur.

== Biography ==
Sultan Sanjar Mirza was appointed as the viceroy of Persia during the reign of Abul-Qasim Babur Mirza and left Shiraz for Isfahan to fulfill his duties. In 1452/3, the army of Jahan Shah Qaraquyunli conquered Shiraz and Isfahan, and Sultan Sanjar was forced to flee to Herat. In 1453, Abul-Qasim Babur Mirza sent Sultan Sanjar to reoccupy Kerman. In 1454/55, A.Babur granted the provinces of Merv, Mokhan, and Jam to Sultan Sanjar as fiefs. Mirza Sanjar had great influence in Babur's court. Abdurrazaq Samarkandi reported that he had resolved some conflicts in the country during the Mirza's illness. After the death of Abul-Qasim Babur (1457), Sultan Sanjar did not want to bow to his successor Shah Mahmud. In 1458, when Jahan Shah Turkman captured Herat, Sultan Sanjar was forced to declare vassalage to him. When the throne of Khorasan fell to Abu Sa'id Mirza, Sultan Sanjar rebelled with Ala al-Dawla Mirza. However, in the Battle of Sarakhs in 1459, Mirza Sanjar was defeated and taken prisoner by Abu Said's son Sultan Murad. On April 19, 1459, by order of Abu Said, Sultan Sanjar and his emirs Sheikh Zunnun and Muhammadbek were executed. When Abu Said Mirza ordered the execution of Sanjar, Sayyid Sadriddin Kummi, one of the Herat scholars, asked the ruler to cancel the execution. However, Abu Said did not agree. His head was brought to Herat.

== Family ==
In 1457, Sanjar Mirza gave his daughter Beka Begum to Sultan Husayn Bayqara. Later, their relationship deteriorated and reached the point of conflict.
