= Siege of Balkh (1447) =

Battle of the Timurid Civil Wars

- Part of the Timurid Civil Wars
Date	Winter of 1447
Location	Balkh, Afghanistan
Result	Status quo ante bellum

Belligerents
Timurids of Khurasan	Timurids of Samarkand

Commanders and leaders
Ala al-Dawla Mirza	Abdal-Latif Mirza

After the Battle of Nishapur and the peace treaty which gave the Chechektu valley to Ala al-Dawla Mirza, he placed in that outpost a certain Mirza Saleh who was an enemy of Abdal-Latif Mirza. Furthermore, Ala-ud-Daulah Mirza kept hostages, certain men of importance, who were in the entourage of Abdal-Latif Mirza against the treaty. This forced Abdal-Latif Mirza's hand to take action which he did by attacking Mirza Saleh who then escaped to Herat. On this Ala al-Dawla Mirza marched from Herat with his army and besieged Balkh in the winter of 1447 C.E. Abdal-Latif Mirza sent a letter to his father Ulugh Beg for reinforcements. In response Ulugh Beg sent an envoy to Ala al-Dawla Mirza to admonish him and to let him know to address his grievances to Samarkand in the future rather than go to war. Finally, realizing his mistake Ala al-Dawla Mirza agreed to move his army back to Herat.
