= Yadgar Muhammad Mirza =

Timurid ruler of Herat in 1470

Timurid ruler of Herat
- Reign: 1470
- Predecessor: Sultan Husayn Bayqara
- Successor: Sultan Husayn Bayqara
- Born: c. 1452
- Died: 1470 (aged 17–18)
- House: Timurid dynasty
- Father: Sultan Muhammad
- Mother: Tundi Biki

Yadgar Muhammad Mirza (c. 1452 – 1470) was a Timurid prince who briefly ruled Herat in opposition to Sultan Husayn Bayqara in 1470. He was the last member of Shah Rukh's line to play a significant role in the Timurid dynastic struggles.

Yadgar Muhammad was the son of Sultan Muhammad bin Baysunghur, a grandson of Shah Rukh, and Tundi Biki, a daughter of the Qara Qoyunlu ruler Jahanshah. After the Aq Qoyunlu ruler Uzun Hasan defeated and killed Jahanshah near Muş in November 1467, Yadgar Muhammad was captured along with other Qara Qoyunlu and Timurid leaders.

In early 1469, the Timurid ruler Abu Sa'id Mirza was defeated by Uzun Hasan at the Battle of Qarabagh and captured while attempting to withdraw toward Khurasan. Uzun Hasan handed him over to Yadgar Muhammad, who held Abu Sa'id responsible for the killing of his great-grandmother Gawhar Shad. Abu Sa'id was executed on 5 February 1469.

Later in 1469, Uzun Hasan backed Yadgar Muhammad in a bid to take Khurasan from Husayn Bayqara. Astarabad was initially taken in Uzun Hasan's name, but Husayn defeated Yadgar Muhammad in September and drove him back across the frontier at Simnan. After relations between Husayn and Uzun Hasan deteriorated, Uzun Hasan sent three armies into Khurasan, including forces under his sons Zaynal and Sultan Khalil. In May 1470, he issued a rescript proclaiming Yadgar Muhammad governor of Khurasan.

Husayn was forced to leave Herat in early summer, and Yadgar Muhammad entered the city and was installed as ruler. Once in power, he pressed Uzun Hasan to recall the Aq Qoyunlu troops that had installed him. His rule nevertheless alienated many of Herat's notables, who agreed to restore Husayn on the night of 21 August 1470. Yadgar Muhammad was caught by surprise and executed several days later.

== Sources ==
- Melvin-Koushki, Matthew (2011). "The Delicate Art of Aggression: Uzun Hasan's Fathnama to Qaytbay of 1469". Iranian Studies. 44 (2): 193–214. doi:10.1080/00210862.2011.541688.
- Woods, John E. (1990). The Timurid Dynasty. Papers on Inner Asia. Vol. 14. Bloomington: Indiana University, Research Institute for Inner Asian Studies. OCLC 23143576.
- Woods, John E. (1999). The Aqquyunlu: Clan, Confederation, Empire (Revised and expanded ed.). Salt Lake City: University of Utah Press. ISBN 0-87480-565-1.

Yadgar Muhammad Mirza Timurid dynasty
Preceded by Sultan Husayn Bayqara	Timurid ruler of Herat; 1470	Succeeded by Sultan Husayn Bayqara
