= Mughal war of succession =

Mughal war of succession may refer to:

- Mughal war of succession (1627–1628), after the death of emperor Nuruddin Salim Jahangir of the Mughal Empire
- Mughal war of succession (1658–1659), after grave illness of emperor Shah Jahan of the Mughal Empire
- Mughal war of succession (1707–1709), after the death of emperor Aurangzeb of the Mughal Empire
- Mughal war of succession (1712–1720), after the death of emperor Bahadur Shah I of the Mughal Empire

== See also ==
- Princely rebellion § Mughal Empire, for princely wars against well-established Mughal emperors
- Pandyan Civil War (1169–1177), between Parakrama Pandyan I and his son
- Pandyan Civil war of 1308-1323, after the death of Maravarman Kulasekara Pandyan I
- Marava war of succession (1720–1729), after the death of raja Raghunatha Kilavan of the Ramnad estate
- Maratha war of succession (1749–1752), after the death of maharaja Shahu I of the Maratha Empire
- Persian war of succession (disambiguation)
- Indian War (disambiguation)
- Mughal–Safavid war (disambiguation)
- Mughal (disambiguation)
