= Abu Sa'id Mirza =

Sultan of the Timurid Empire (1451–1469)

Abu Sa'id Mirza ابو سعید میرزا
- Mirza; Sultan
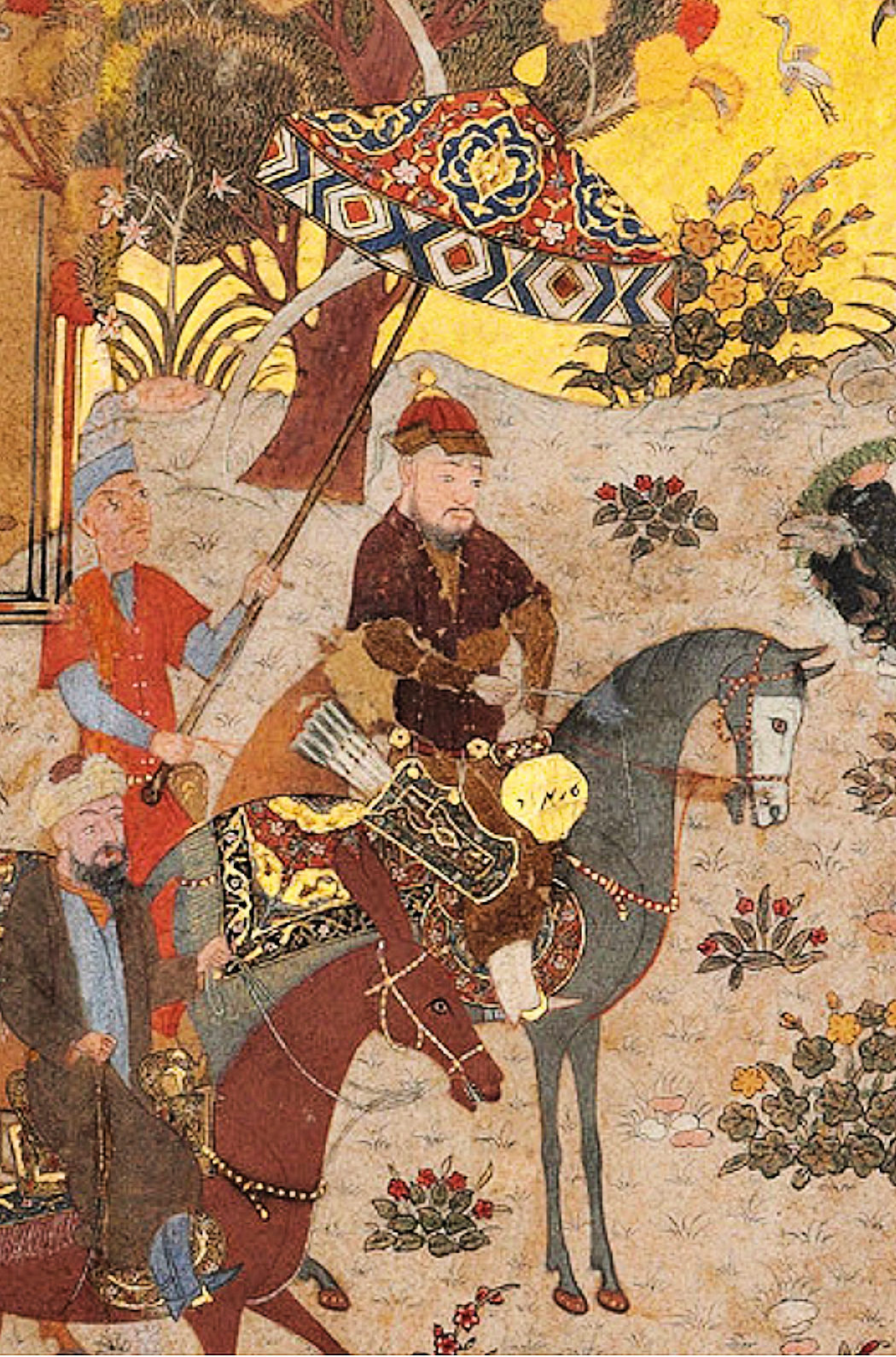
- Contemporary depiction of Abu Sa'id Mirza

Ruler of the Timurid Empire
- Reign: Samarkand: 1451–5 February 1469; Herat: 1459–5 February 1469
- Predecessor: Abdullah Mirza
- Successor: Sultan Ahmed Mirza
- Born: c. 1424; Herat, Timurid Empire (present-day Afghanistan)
- Died: 5 February 1469 (aged 44–45)
- Burial: Cairo, Egypt (head only)
- Spouse: See below
- Issue: Sultan Ahmad Mirza; Sultan Mahmud Mirza; Umar Shaikh Mirza II; Ulugh Beg Mirza II; Many other children
- Dynasty: Timurid
- Father: Muhammad Mirza

Abu Sa'id Mirza (Chagatay/Persian: ابو سعید میرزا; 1424 – 5 February 1469) was the ruler of the Timurid Empire during the mid-fifteenth century.

Born a minor prince of the Timurid dynasty, Abu Sa'id quickly established himself as the most prominent among his warring relations. Over the course of two decades, he reunified much of the Timurid Empire, which had become fractured in the aftermath of the death of his great-uncle Shah Rukh. However, Abu Sa'id's hopes of restoring the empire to its former extent at the time of Timur ultimately failed after he was killed during an invasion of what is now western Iran.

He was the paternal grandfather of Babur, who later founded the Mughal Empire of India.

== Early life and power struggles ==
Abu Sa'id Mirza was born in 1424, the second son of the Timurid prince Muhammad Mirza, a son of Miran Shah, himself the third son of Timur. Muhammad Mirza appears to have had little involvement in political matters, though did maintain a close relationship with his influential cousin Ulugh Beg, son of the ruling sultan Shah Rukh and governor of Transoxiana. When the former visited Muhammad Mirza on his death-bed, the dying prince took Abu Sa'id's hand and placed it in Ulugh Beg's, putting the boy under his protection.

=== Initial power struggles ===
Abu Sa'id was given a role at Ulugh Beg's court, later receiving his daughter in marriage through good service. However, upon Ulugh Beg's ascension to the Timurid throne following the death of Shah Rukh, Abu Sa'id turned against his benefactor. In 1449, while the former was suppressing the rebellion of his son Abdal-Latif, Abu Sa'id left his post on the northern borders and used a group of Arghun tribesmen to lead an attack on the capital Samarqand. Ulugh Beg's other son Abdal-Aziz retreated to the citadel and warned his father, who marched his army back to the city, forcing Abu Sa'id to retreat. However, Abdal-Latif used this distraction to his advantage, pursuing and defeating Ulugh Beg, whom he had assassinated soon after. Abu Sa'id led his forces against his cousin, but was also defeated, as well as being taken captive.

Abu Sa'id escaped his imprisonment in Samarqand in 1450, fleeing to Bukhara. However, he found little support there and was imprisoned, only being spared execution when news of Abdal-Latif's death reached the city. The Bukhari nobles hastened to release the prince and swore their allegiance to him, upon which he immediately marched against the new ruler, Ulugh Beg's nephew Abdullah Mirza. After an initial failed assault on Samarqand, Abu Sa'id and his small group of followers seized the frontier town of Yasi. When Abdullah marched his forces out in retaliation, Abu Sa'id appealed to the Uzbek ruler Abu'l-Khayr Khan for aid. The latter agreed and their combined forces defeated Abdullah in June 1451. Given that his rival was killed during the battle, the victors were able to enter Samarqand unopposed. Abu Sa'id claimed the Timurid throne and in thanks to the Uzbeks, gave Abu'l-Khayr Khan rich presents as well as Ulugh Beg's daughter in marriage.

== Reign ==
=== Encounters with Timurid princes ===
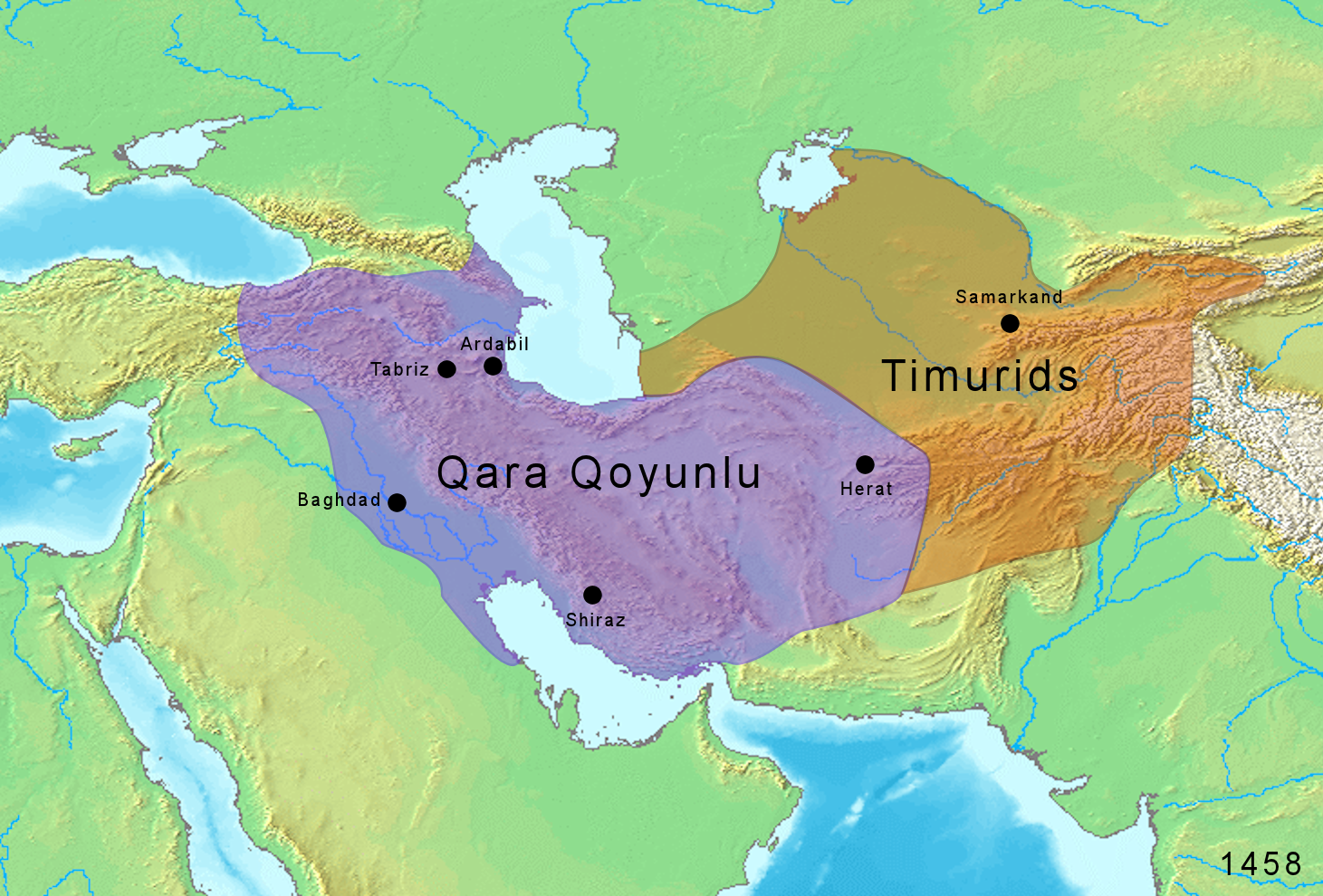
Maximum extent of Qara Qoyunlu territory in 1458 under Jahan Shah

When Abu Sa'id annexed Balkh in 1454, another Timurid, Abul-Qasim Babur of Herat, led his forces against him in response, culminating in a siege on Samarqand. However, the two sides eventually agreed on a truce, establishing the Amu Darya river as a border. This treaty remained in effect until Abul-Qasim Babur's death in 1457, when his young son and successor Mahmud was ousted from Herat by Ibrahim Mirza, a great-nephew of Ulugh Beg. Abu Sa'id, who desired to conquer the city as well as the surrounding region of Khorasan, led his forces against Ibrahim, forcing the latter to flee. However, he was unable to capture the city until 1456. The following year, Abu Sa'id had Shah Rukh's aged widow, the influential dowager-empress Gawhar Shad executed, having accused her of conspiring with Ibrahim, who was her great-grandson.

Noting the conflict among the Timurid princes, Jahan Shah, ruler of the Qara Qoyunlu, took advantage of the situation and marched his forces into the region, capturing Herat in 1458. Jahan Shah had already had great success in conquering much of the western Timurid territories. However, as he was facing a revolt by his son Hasan Ali, he was forced to abandon his latest conquests, allowing the re-annexation of Khorasan by Abu Sa'id, who subsequently made Herat his capital. Friendly relations were established between the two rulers, with multiple embassy missions taking place throughout the 1460s. During this period, Abu Sa'id continued to consolidate his power. In 1459, he defeated the combined forces of the three Timurid princes, Sultan Sanjar, Ibrahim Mirza and Ala al-Dawla, in the Battle of Sarakhs. Sanjar was captured and executed after the battle and the latter two died in exile in the following years. Abul-Qasim Babur's ousted son Mahmud also died around this time. With the deaths of so many rivals, Abu Sa'id now had the resources to extend his dominion up to Mazandaran and Sistan. The sultan even succeeded in conquering Badakhshan, a region which Timur himself had gained only nominal suzerainty over.

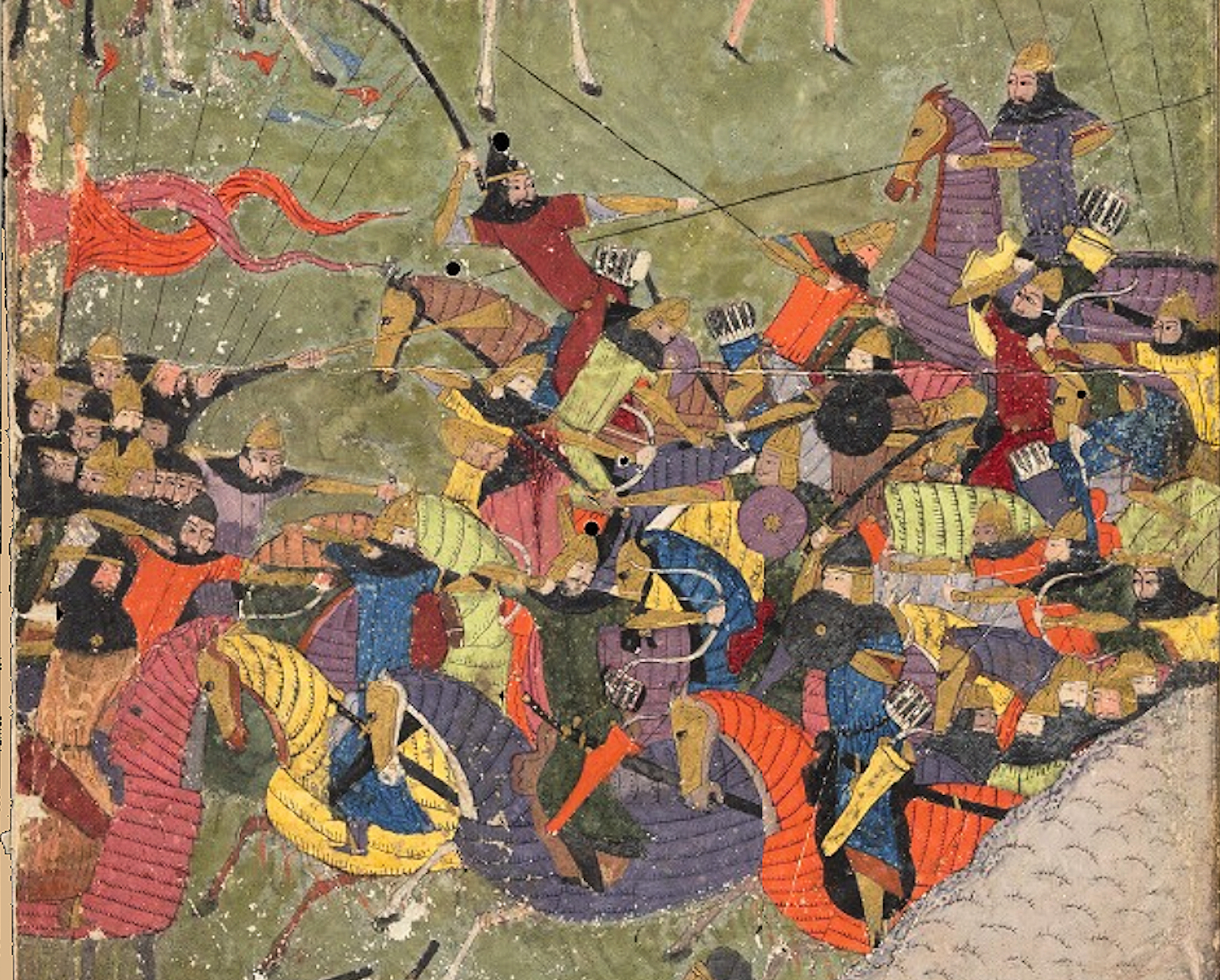
Contemporary depiction of Qara Qoyunlu forces (left) in battle against Timurid forces (right). 1430 Shahnama, Bodleian Library.

However, other Timurid princes remained who continued to challenge his rule. In 1454, Uways Mirza, a descendant of Timur's eldest son Umar Shaikh, started an uprising with the aid of Abu'l-Khayr Khan, Abu Sa'id's erstwhile ally, during which the latter suffered a serious defeat. Abu Sa'id faced similar threats from another descendant of Umar Shaikh, Sultan Husayn Bayqara. The latter had previously captured Gorgan from a Qara Qoyunlu chief when Jahan Shah had withdrawn from the region. Although he initially swore fealty to Abu Sa'id, when his overlord was distracted by a rebellion in 1460, Husayn Bayqara occupied Mazandaran and then laid siege to Herat the following year. Although he was later expelled from these lands, Husayn Bayqara nevertheless continued to make raids into Abu Sa'id's territories with impunity. In 1461, Muhammad Juki, son of Abdal-Latif, also rose in rebellion. He pillaged his way through Transoxiana before occupying the city of Shahrukhiyya, where Abu Sa'id was forced to launch an extended siege which lasted from November 1462 to September 1463.

=== War with the Aq Qoyunlu ===
Towards the end of 1467, Abu Sa'id received word of the death of Jahan Shah at the hands of Uzun Hasan, the ruler of the Aq Qoyunlu, a kingdom which had previously been the traditional allies of the Timurids. Abu Sa'id, in spite of his warm relations with Jahan Shah, had never truly abandoned hopes of recapturing the western territories which had previously been conquered by the Qara Qoyunlu. Seeing these lands now being absorbed by the Aq Qoyunlu, Abu Sa'id was aware that any chance of reclaiming them was unlikely if Uzun Hasan's rise was not checked. Therefore, under the pretext of responding to Jahan Shah's son Hasan Ali's appeal for aid, Abu Sa'id launched a campaign against the Aq Qoyunlu in February 1468.

It seems that this campaign was an impulsive undertaking, with little initial planning being involved. This became clear when Abu Sa'id began to advance without waiting for all his troops to arrive, thus failing to ensure that he had adequate reserves. Though he did manage to dislodge the Aq Qoyunlu governors of Iraq-i Ajam and Fars, as well as having his authority recognised in areas such as Gilan, he did not do enough to establish order in the hinterland as he advanced. Some important strongholds were not captured and were even bypassed entirely, such as the city of Ray. He also paid little attention to declarations of friendship and peaceful intentions from Uzun Hasan which reached him en route.

However, Abu Sa'id's situation during this time was relatively favourable. Following Jahan Shah's death, there were a fair number of his former amirs who were eager to support a new leader in a fight against Uzun Hasan. Therefore, upon the arrival of the Timurid army in Miyana, Abu Sa'id was joined by these amirs as well as 50,000 Turkmen troops. Jahan Shah's sons Yusuf and Hasan Ali, as well as the latter's son Amirzada Ali, also lent their support. When the army reached the banks of the Araxes, the Shirvanshah Farrukh Yassar too joined in the coalition.

In spite of this strength, the Timurid army soon found itself in a dangerous situation before any true fighting was engaged. Already suffering from difficulties posed by the Azerbaijani winter, the troops began to face serious supply issues. This was due to the supply routes back to Khorasan, stretching over 1200 miles, being vulnerable to disruption. A supply column was intercepted by Uzun Hasan, who also blocked off access to ships carrying provisions from Shirvan. In addition to this, he quickly succeeded in blocking all routes through which reinforcements could be brought, and mounted attacks from Ray against Timurid communications. The lack of food, winter clothing, riding and transport animals as well as continual surprise raids by the Aq Qoyunlu undermined the morale of Abu Sa'id's troops. This worsened when Uzun Hasan convinced Farrukh Yassar to defect from the Timurids, resulting in a large number of desertions.

=== Death and aftermath ===
The demoralised and depleted army marched via Ardabil into the Mugan steppes, where they were met by the Aq Qoyunlu troops. In the ensuing disastrous Battle of Qarabagh, Abu Sa'id suffered heavy losses and was taken prisoner. Uzun Hasan handed the captive sultan over to Yadgar Muhammad Mirza, a Timurid who had been taking refuge with him. In vengeance for the execution of his great-grandmother Gawhar Shad twelve years previously, Yadgar Muhammad had Abu Sa'id executed on 5 February 1469. Uzun Hasan sent his severed head to Qaitbay, the Mamluk Sultan of Egypt, who gave it an Islamic burial.

Abu Sa'id's death resulted in the final loss of all Timurid lands west of Khorasan to the Aq Qoyunlu. What remained of the empire was divided among various princes. Abu Sa'id's eldest son Sultan Ahmad received Samarqand, while his second son Sultan Mahmud gained Badakhshan and Hissar. A third son, Ulugh Beg II, became ruler of Kabul and Ghazni while the fourth, Umar Shaikh (future father of Babur) inherited Ferghana. However, the greatest of the new Timurid rulers was not one of Abu Sa'id's sons, but rather Husayn Bayqara, who reigned from his former overlord's capital of Herat.

== Administration ==
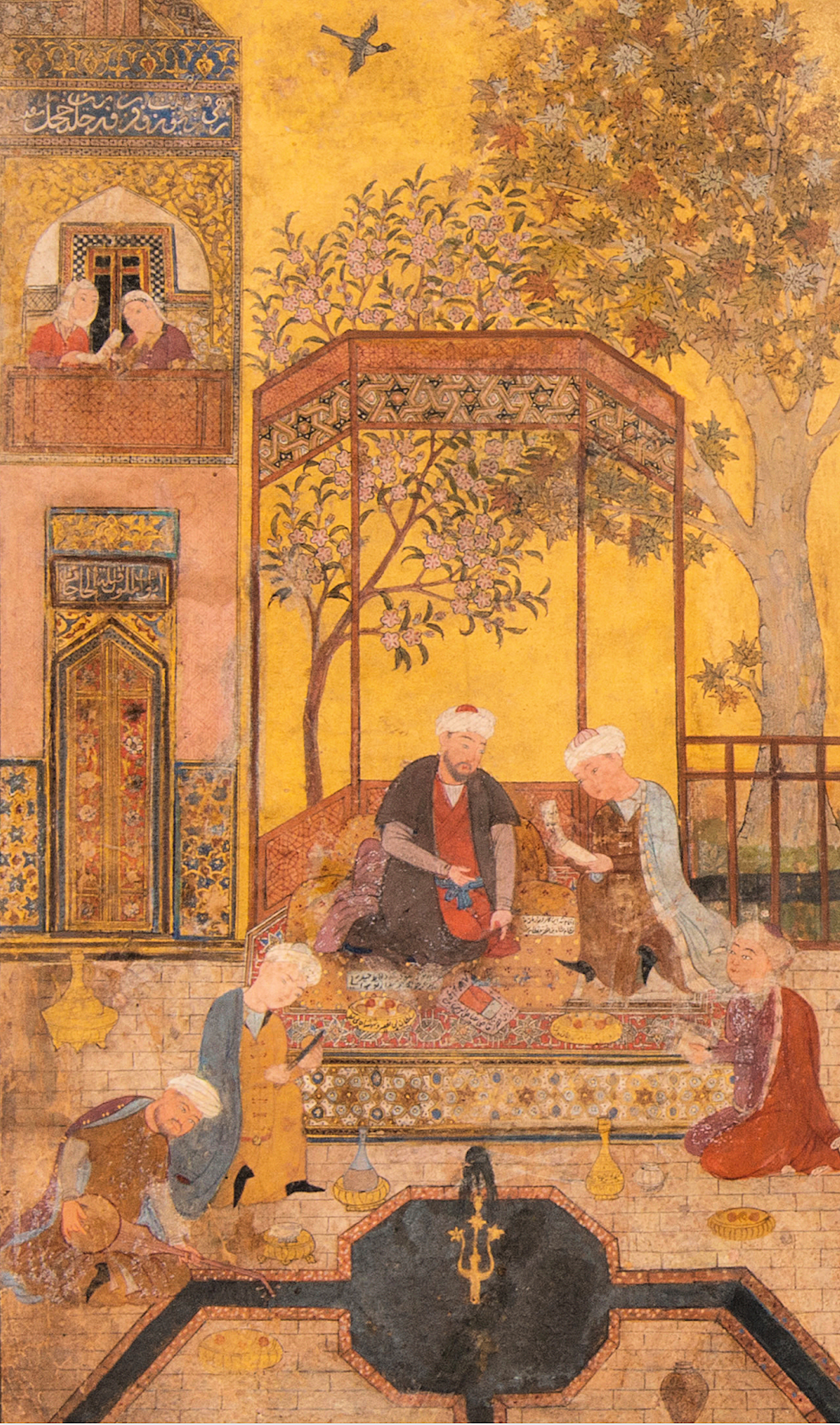
Court scene in the Jam’i Jam (The Cup of Jamshid), which includes a eulogy of the reigning Sultan Abu-Sa’id in 1459-60 in Herat.

Abu Sa'id was able to bring stability to the internal situation of his empire, in a region that had previously been subject to the conflicts of multiple bellicose factions. However, this was not achieved without considerable bloodshed, with his advent to power being accompanied by murders and executions which surpassed in cruelty even those seen during Timur's reign. The scholar Khwandamir reports that court officials were deposed and sometimes killed for misappropriating funds, including Abu Sa'id's vizier Qutb al-Din Simnani. When the army tax-collector Khwaja Mu'izz al-Din and moneychanger Shaikh Ahmad were accused of bribery and extortion in 1462, Abu Sa'id had the pair brutally executed. Shaikh Ahmad was skinned alive at the gates of Herat, while Khwaja Mu'izz al-Din was boiled in a cauldron at the foot of the citadel. Women could also be caught up in the court intrigues. This includes Abu Sa'id's execution of Gawhar Shad, which was viewed negatively by contemporary chroniclers.

He is generally seen as a typical representative of the Turkmen military aristocracy. His main prop to power was the Arghuns, a Turk tribe which had early on elected him as their chief and upon whom he counted for support in his political and military ventures. In return, the tribe was greatly favoured, with it being notable that Abu Sa'id's chief wife was the daughter of an Arghun lord. He consolidated his power through the granting of fiefs, which he provided generously to leading members of the tribe, his sons, as well as secular and religious dignitaries.

Abu Sa'id's rule was also buoyed by the support of the religious classes. His policies were subsequently greatly influenced by Islamic dervishes, who tended to oppose the cultural expressions which marked the reign of his predecessor Ulugh Beg. The most prominent among these dervishes was the Sufi Naqshbandi shaikh, Ubaydullah al-Ahrar, with whom the sultan shared a close relationship. Under Ahrar's encouragement, Abu Sa'id re-instituted Sharia law in Samarqand and Bukhara, and removed taxes on commerce which could not be reconciled with religious doctrine. (Note: The removal of this tax may have been as much a reversal of an act by an earlier, little-liked ruler as a shift in policy toward Islamic taxation systems.) It was also partially through the shaikh's persuasion that Abu Sa'id launched his final, fatal campaign against the Aq Qoyunlu. However, another powerful dervish, Burhan al-Din, titled "Shaikh al-Islam", also held great power in the royal court. Unlike Ahrar, Burhan al-Din sought to preserve the traditions of Ulugh Beg. Abu Sa'id made use of the authority of either shaikh depending on the circumstance. Ahrar's influence held sway among the common people as well as the army, while Burhan al-Din's cultural interests more closely aligned with that of the government, which proved useful when faced with popular uprisings.

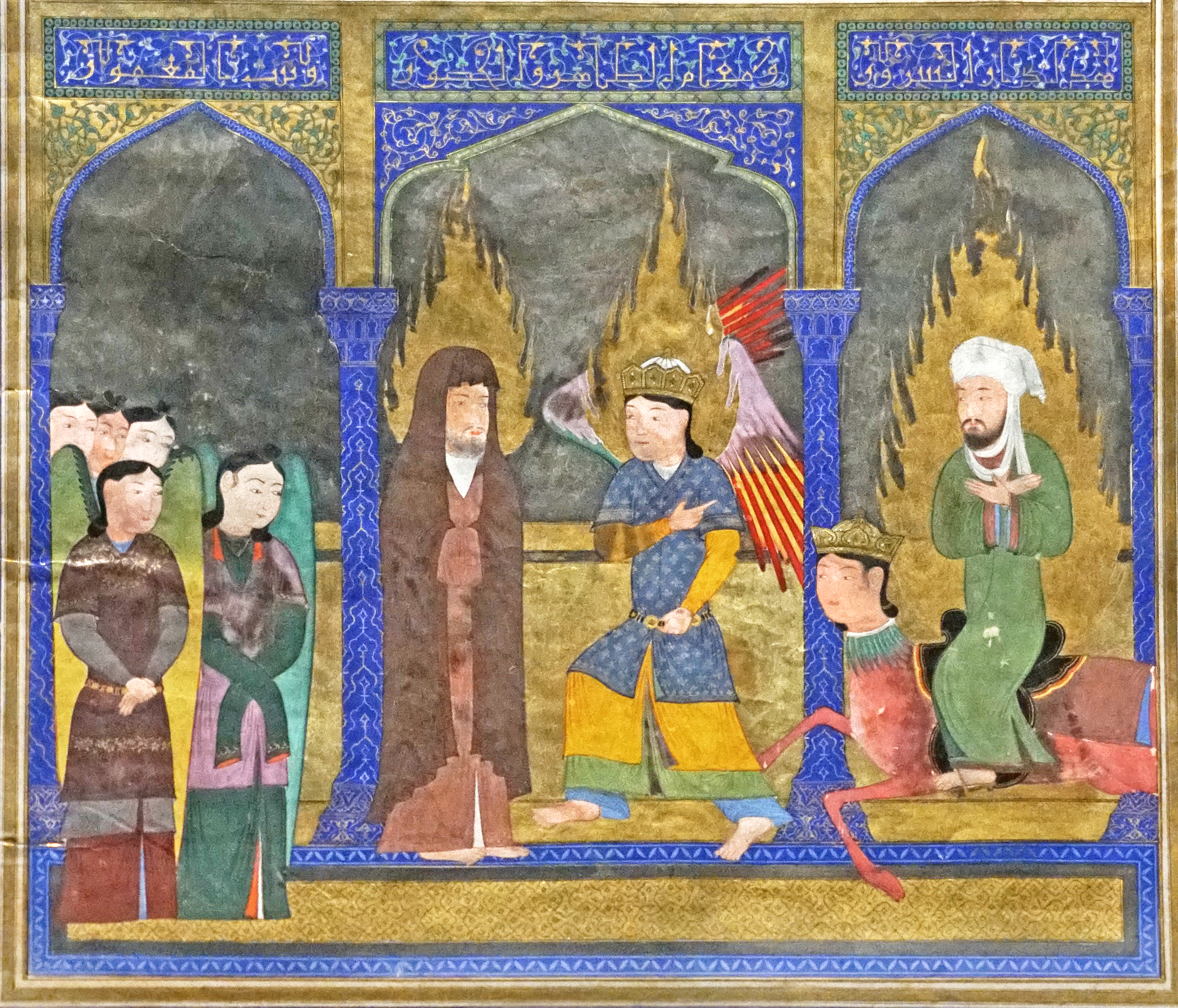
Jesus and Muhammad introduced by an angel in paradise. Timurid, 1466.

It is perhaps in response to these types of uprisings that Abu Sa'id developed a special interest in agriculture and the welfare of peasants. Among other policies, he began tax provisions which favoured agriculture and made improvements to existing irrigation systems. In regard to the latter, his vizier Qutb al-Din Simnani was particularly active in the construction of the Juy-i Sultani Canal to the north of Herat.

Abu Sa'id himself does not seem to have personally engaged in large-scale building projects, perhaps because of the time he spent on campaigns. However, there are some works which have been credited to him. This includes the Aq Saray (white palace) in Herat, which shifted the royal living space to outside the city walls, "marking a conscious break with the past." Other public works attributed to him include repairs to the Gulistān dam "while at the same time appropriating the lands it watered". Buildings include an aiwan at the musalla in Herat, repairs to Ghār-i Karukh which includes an inscription, and construction of a spa and bath at Ūba (Obeh), a "resort for the Timurids" in their summer quarters.

== Legacy ==
Views on Abu Sa'id tend to be favourable based on his success in maintaining a large, cohesive dominion for nearly two decades, in spite of being involved in a near continual state of warfare. The 15th-century historian Mīr-Khvānd in his Rawżat aṣ-ṣafāʾ described Abu Sa'id as "supreme amongst the princes of the House of Timur in high enterprise, lofty rank and perfect discernment. He was a friend and patron of scholars, theologians and men of letters, and during the period of his rule the lands of Turkistan, Turan, Khorasan, Zabulistan, Sistan and Mazandaran attained the zenith of prosperity."

However, in spite of his achievements, Abu Sa'id failed in his endeavour to restore the Timurid Empire to its extent at the time of Timur, or even that of Shah Rukh. He was unable to achieve a lasting peace in his domains and within forty years of his death, nearly all his territories were lost to external invasions. However, these losses eventually pushed his grandson Babur to begin his conquests in the Indian subcontinent, leading to the foundation of the Mughal Empire.

== Marriages ==
Abu Sa'id had thirty-nine consorts (wives and concubines):

- Khanzada Begum, daughter of Abu'l Khayr Khan
- Rabia Sultan Begum, daughter of his paternal uncle Muhammad Timur Mirza and Khand Sultan Begi
- Aqa Begum (Taghay Shah), daughter of Ulugh Beg
- Qutlugh Sultan Khanum
- Malik Sultan Begum, daughter of Ordu Bugha Tarkhan Arghun
- Shah Sultan Begum Mughal
- Shahzada Begum, daughter of Shah Sultan Muhammad of Badakshan
- Khanzada Begum, daughter of Khanzada Taj-al-Din Tirmizi
- Saliha Sultan Agha, daughter of Chake Barlas
- Jamal Begi Agha Barlas
- Dawlat Bakht Agha, daughter of Qazan Shaikh Mughal
- Kanizak Begi Agha, daughter of Shaikh Yusuf Ilke
- Umid Agha, daughter of Sultan Ahmad, son of Ghiyas Beg
- Qutlugh Begi Agha, daughter of Muhammad son of Khudaidad, former wife of Ibrahim Mirza
- Ruqaiya Sultan Begum, daughter of Ala al-Dawla Mirza
- Khurshid Begi Aghacha, daughter of Murad Akhtaji
- Dilshad Aghacha, daughter of Amir Buzurg, son of Amir Bayan
- Bay Malik Aghacha, daughter of Jan Darvish
- Aafaq Aghacha Kukaltash, foster sister of Ibrahim Mirza
- Shahum Aghacha, daughter of Amir Yahya Qushji
- Hanifa Sultan Aghacha, daughter of Amir Ajab Mughal
- Dawlat Sultan Aghacha, daughter of Rustam Tuta
- Bulghan Aghacha
- Makhdum Aghacha, relative of Sultan Muhammad, son of Ghiyas Beg
- Sa'adat Bakht Aghacha, daughter of Ali Araka, Pirzada of Baghdad
- Afaq Aghacha
- Gohar Sultan Aghacha, daughter of Khwaja Rasti
- Gulshah Aghacha
- Shah Sultan Aghacha
- Subur Sultan Aghacha, daughter of Abd al-Shaikh
- Khadija Begi Khurd, daughter of Mawlana Nasr-al-Din
- Nusrat Sultan Aghacha, daughter of Shah Saqd Wali Suldoz
- Bibi Sultan Aghacha, daughter of FarrukhShah Qauchin
- Gulrukh Sultan Aghacha, daughter of Yusuf, son of Hamza
- Zainab Begi Agha, daughter of Sultan Ahmad Suldoz
- Khadija Begum, daughter of Amir Muhammad Sarik bin Amir Muhammad Khawaja
- Habiba Sultan Begum, daughter of Amir Jalal-ud-din Suhrab

== Children ==
Abu Sa'id had sixty known children:

By Khanzada Begum (daughter of Abu'l Khayr Khan):

- Sultan Muhammad

By Aqa Begum (Taghay Shah):

- Sultan Badi al-Mulk
- Gawhar Shad Begum (d. after 1531) (Note: These women were recorded to have travelled to Agra in 1531 to attend the "Mystic Feast", a celebration hosted by their great-nephew Humayun to commemorate the fourth anniversary of his ascension to the Mughal throne.)
- Khanzada Begum

By Malik Sultan Begum: (Note: John E. Woods has more recently identified the mother of Sultan Ahmad and Sultan Mahmud as being Aqa Begum (Taghay Shah), daughter of Ulugh Beg.)

- Sultan Ahmad (1451 – 1494)
- Sultan Mahmud (1453 – 1495)
- Khadija Sultan Begi (d. after 1531)

By Shah Sultan Begum Mughal: (Note: The background of Umar Shaikh's mother is uncertain, though Annette Beveridge had suggested that she may be identical to the mother of Sultan Ahmad and Sultan Mahmud.)

- Umar Shaikh Mirza II (1456 – 1494)

By Shahzada Begum:

- Abu Bakr (d. 1479)

By Khanzada Begum (daughter of Khanzada Taj-al-Din Tirmizi):

- Shah Muhammad

By Saliha Sultan Agha:

- Zubayda Sultan Begi

By Dawlat Bakht Agha:

- Muhammad Jahangir
- Sultan Jahangir
- Sultan Khalil
- Sa’adat Sultan Begi
- Sahib Sultan Begi
- Bibi Begum

By Kanizak Begi Agha:

- Sultan Ibrahim
- Sultan Bakht Begi (d. after 1531)
- Jahan Sultan Begi

By Umid Agha:

- Aman Sultan Begi

By Qutlugh Begi Agha:

- Umar (d. after 1478)

By Ruqaiya Sultan Begum:

- Shah Rukh (1459 – 1493/4)
- Baysunghur (b. 1456)
- Urun Sultan Khanum; married Badi' al-Zaman Mirza

By Khurshid Begi Aghacha:

- Qutlugh Tarkan Agha

By Dilshad Aghacha:

- Sultan Sanjar
- Payanda Sultan Begum; married Sultan Husayn Bayqara
- Rabia Sultan Begi; married Muhammad Qasim, a descendant of Miran Shah
- Aisha Sultan Begi

By Bay Malik Aghacha:

- Abdullah
- Sultan Murad (d. after 1475)
- Shahrbanu Begi; married Sultan Husayn Bayqara
- Mihr Nush Begi
- Mihr Banu Begi

By Afaq Aghacha Kukaltash:

- Sultan Begi
- Badr Jamal Begi (d. after 1531)

By Shahum Aghacha:

- Tuman Agha
- Shirin Beg Agha

By Hanifa Sultan Aghacha:

- Sultan Muhammad (d. c. 1494)

By Dawlat Sultan Aghacha:

- Iskandar

By Bulghan Aghacha:

- Shah Mansur
- Maryam Sultan Begi

By Makhdum Aghacha:

- Qutlugh Sultan Begi

By Sa'adat Bakht Aghacha:

- Khvand Sultan Begi

By Gohar Sultan Aghacha:

- Miran Shah
- Fakhr Jahan Begi (d. after 1531); married Mir Ala-al-Mulk of Termez
- Bibi Khan Begi

By Gulshah Aghacha:

- Rustam
- Dawlat Sultan Begi

By Shah Sultan Aghacha:

- Zainab Begi

By Subur Sultan Aghacha:

- Sultan Usman

By Nusrat Sultan Aghacha:

- Sultan Walad (d. after 1469)

By Bibi Sultan Aghacha:

- Muzaffar

By Gulrukh Sultan Aghacha:

- Aisha Sultan Begi

By Zainab Begi Agha:

- Qutlugh Sultan Begi

By unnamed mothers:

- Ulugh Beg II (d. 1501/2)
- Khvand Sultan Begi
- Khadija Sultan Begi
- Aq Begum (d. after 1531)

== Notes ==
Abu Sa'id Mirza Timurid dynasty
Preceded by Abdullah	Timurid Empire (in Samarkand); 1451–1469	Succeeded by Sultan Ahmad
Preceded by Ibrahim, then Interregnum (Black Sheep)	Timurid Empire (in Herat); 1459–1469	Succeeded by Sultan Husayn Bayqara
