= Sultan Muhammad (Badakhshan) =

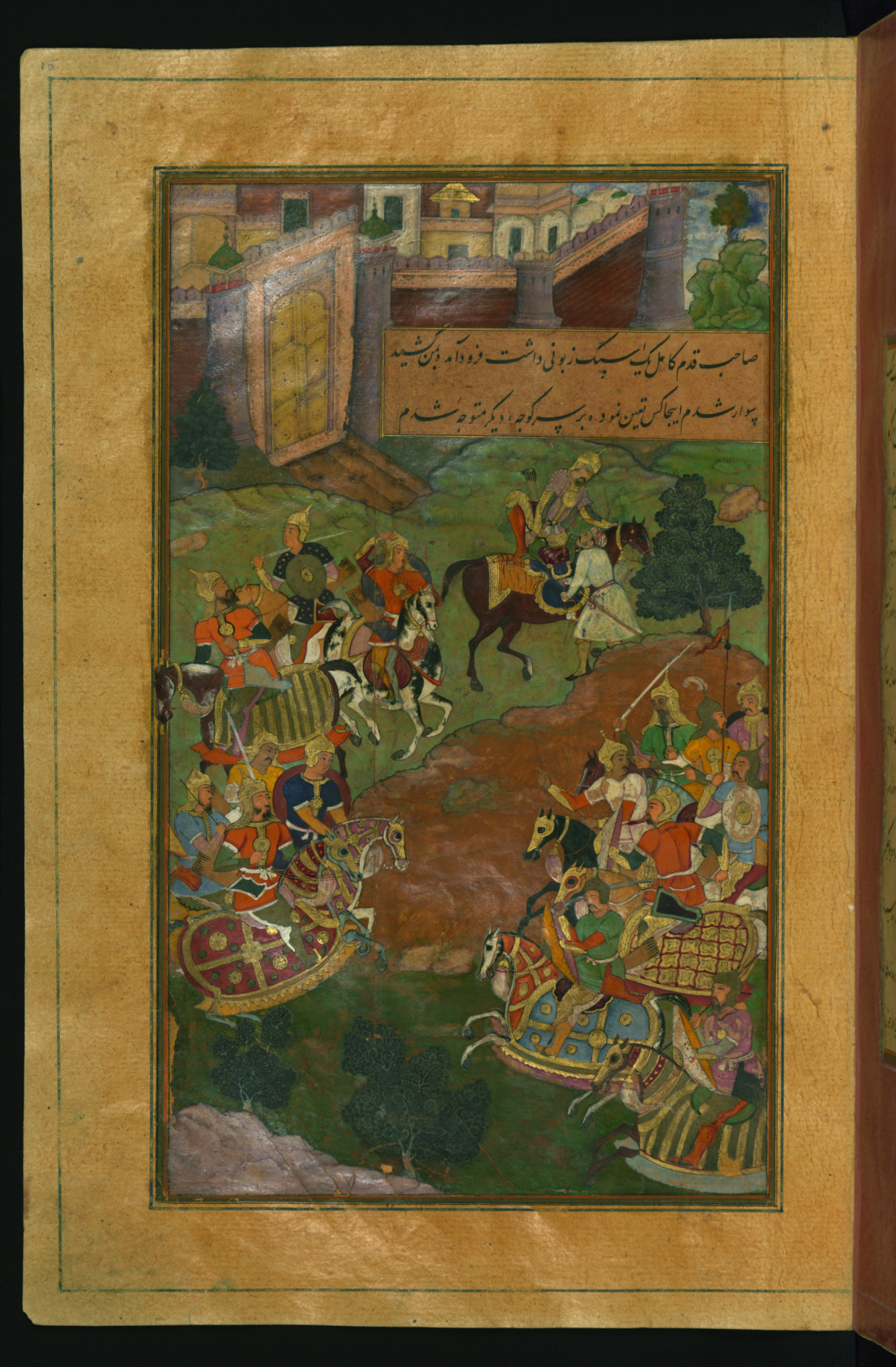
Sultan Muḥammad Vays offers Babur a healthy horse to replace his ailing one.

Sultan Muhhammad (Persian: سلطان محمد) was a 15th-century ruler of Badakhshan. Abu Sa'id Mirza, ruler of the Timurid Empire, supplanted him as ruler of the territory.

== Lineage ==
Shah Sultan Muhammad's family claimed of their descent from Alexander the Great. They contended that they had swayed the scepter of Badakhshan from three thousand years.

== Family ==
He had six daughters:

1. One was married to Sultan Masud Kabuli, who was a descendant of Amir Timur;
2. Shahzada Begum, married to Sultan Abu Sa'id Mirza, and bore him Abubakr Mirza. The Mirza, after the death of his father, engaged in war with Sultan Husain Mirza, and caused much disturbance in the kingdom;
3. One married to Ibrahim Barlas, who bore him a son, Jihangir Barlas, who at the end of Chaghatai rule became chief minister;
4. Shah Begum, married to Yunus Khan of Moghulistan;
5. One married to Sayyid Shah Buzurg Arhangi;
6. One married to Shaikh Abdullah Barlas, who bore him three sons, Sultan Vais Barlas, Mizrab Barlas and Sultan Sanjar;
