= Battle of Tarnab (1448) =

Battle of the Timurid Civil Wars

- Part of the Timurid Civil Wars
Date	Spring 1448
Location	Tarnab (east of Herat), Afghanistan
Result	Timurids of Samarkand victory

Belligerents
Timurids of Khurasan	Timurids of Samarkand

Commanders and leaders
Ala al-Dawla Mirza	Ulugh Beg; Abdal-Latif Mirza

The Battle of Tarnab took place in 1448.

In spring 1448, Ala al-Dawla Mirza was making preparations for the celebration of his son's circumcision ceremony. He had announced a general relief from taxes to all citizens of Herat when he heard the news that Ulugh Beg had crossed the Amu Darya with 90,000 troops. He hastily made his way towards the Tarnab through the Sanjab Pass. The two forces met at Tarnab and after a brief engagement, Ulugh Beg decisively defeated Ala al-Dawla Mirza who fled towards Mashad and then towards Quchan in the protection of his brother Abul-Qasim Babur Mirza. Ulugh Beg followed up his victory by taking Herat and then Mashad. Gawhar Shad and many Tarkhans left Herat before Ulugh Beg's arrival.

== Bibliography ==
=== General sources ===
Other sources:

W. Weberhard (1959), Journal of Oriental Studies, University of Hong Kong
