= Mirza Shah Mahmud =

Sultan of the Timurid Empire in Herat
- Reign: 1457
- Predecessor: Abul-Qasim Babur Mirza
- Successor: Ibrahim Mirza
- Born: c. 1446
- Died: c. 1459; Seistan or Kabul

Mirza Shah Mahmud (born c. 1446) was briefly a Timurid ruler of Herat. He was the son of Abul-Qasim Babur Mirza, who was a great-grandson of Timur. Shah Mahmud succeeded his father upon his death in 1457 at the age of eleven. Only a few weeks later, his cousin Ibrahim Mirza, a son of Ala al-Dawla Mirza, expelled him from Herat. Shah Mahmud failed to distinguish himself in the following years, and died sometime in the 1460s.

Mirza Shah Mahmud Timurid dynasty
Preceded by Abul-Qasim Babur Mirza	Timurid Empire (in Herat); 1457	Succeeded by Ibrahim Mirza
