= Tarnab =

Coordinates: 34°13′12″N 71°40′51″E

Tarnab is a town and union council of Charsadda District in Khyber Pakhtunkhwa province of Pakistan. It is located at 34°13'12N 71°40'51E and has an altitude of 299 metres (984 feet).

There are two towns in same province with the same names. 1st is mentioned above and is located on bank of river swat. The other town - "Tarnab" is located on Peshawar - Nowshehra Road and is especially famous for the Tarnab Experimental Fruit Farms, run by the Government of Khyber-Pakhtunkhwa.
