= Ala al-Dawla Mirza =

Timurid prince (1417–1460)

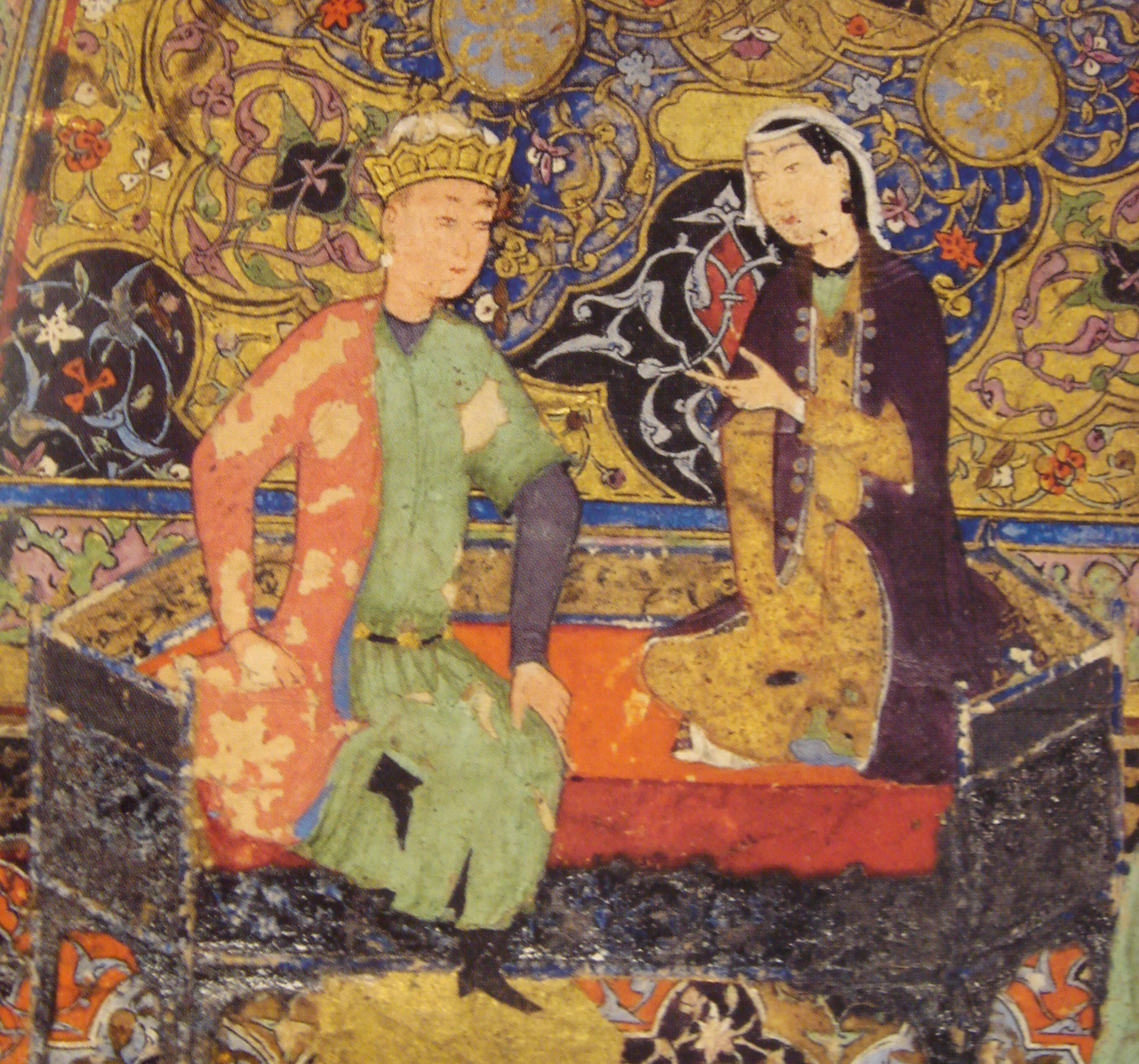
- Born: June/July 1417; Herat, Timurid Empire (present-day Afghanistan)
- Died: 1460 (aged 42–43); Rostamdar, Timurid Empire (present-day Iran)
- Burial: Gawhar Shad Mausoleum, Herat
- Spouse: Zaynab Arlat; Murad Sultan Agha
- Issue: Baysunghur Mirza; Ibrahim Mirza; Ruqaya Sultan Begum; Shahzade
- Rukn-ud-din Ala al-Dawla Mirza
- House: House of Timur
- Father: Baysunghur Mirza
- Mother: Jan Malik Agha
- Religion: Sunni Islam (Hanafi)

Rukn-ud-din Ala al-Dawla Mirza, also spelt Ala ud-Dawla Mirza and Ala ud-Daula Mirza, (1417 – 1460) was a Timurid prince and a grandson of the Central Asian ruler Shah Rukh. Following his grandfather's death, Ala al-Dawla became embroiled in the ensuing succession struggle. Though he initially possessed a strategic advantage, he was eventually overtaken by his more successful rivals. Ala al-Dawla died in exile after numerous failed attempts to gain the throne.

== Early life and career ==
Ala al-Dawla was born in Herat in June/July 1417, the eldest son of Baysunghur Mirza, as well as the only one born of a free wife. His father was himself a son of the Timurid Sultan Shah Rukh. His mother, Jan Malik Agha, a daughter of the Timurid officer Amir Chulpan Qauchin, had been previously married to Baysunghur's cousin Iskandar Mirza. Unlike his younger brothers, Ala al-Dawla was raised at the royal court alongside his cousin Abdal-Latif Mirza by their grandmother, the empress Gawhar Shad. It is likely that she and Shah Rukh were grooming the boys, the firstborns of their two eldest sons, as potential successors to the throne. However, Ala al-Dawla quickly emerged as his grandmother's favourite.

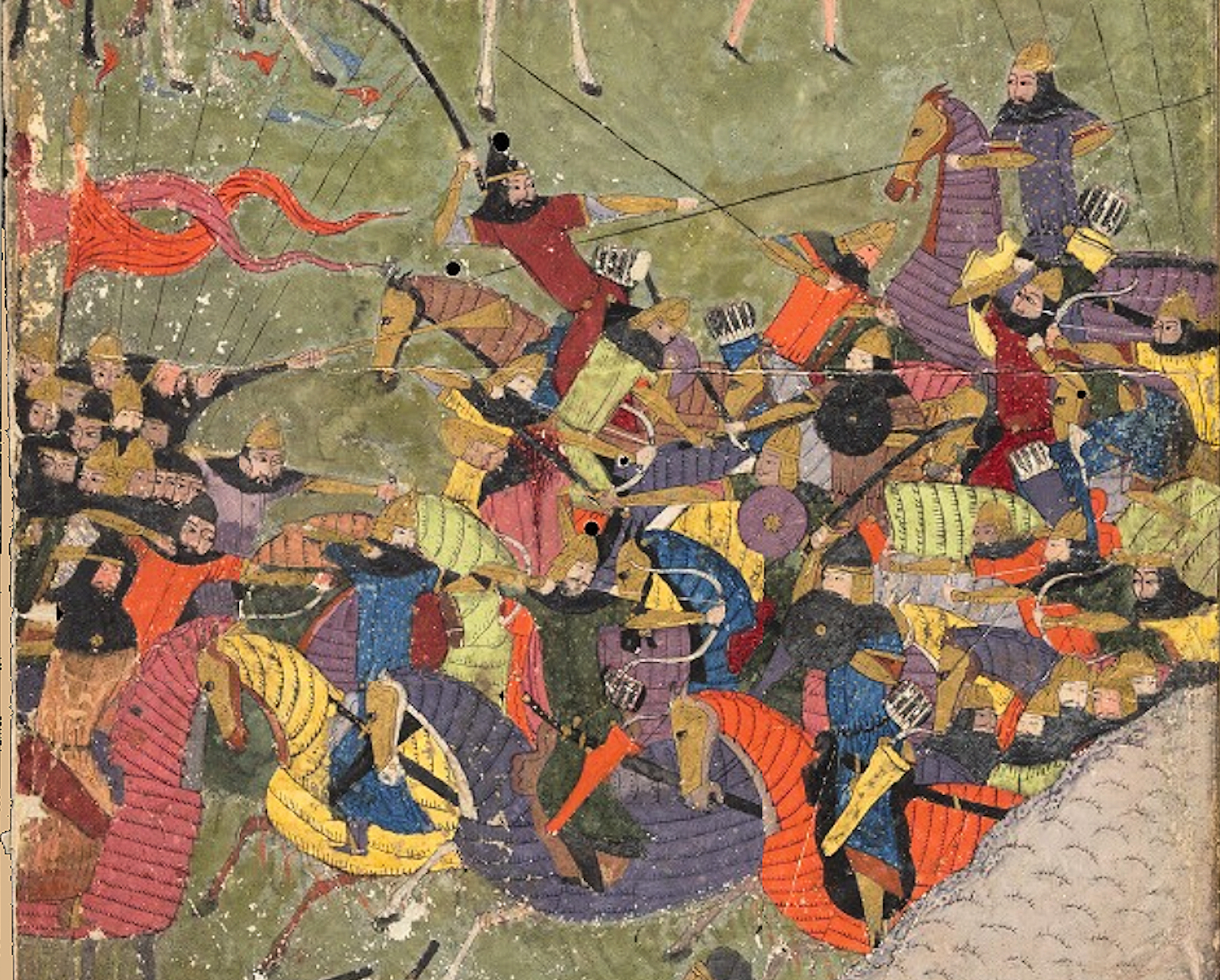
Contemporary depiction of Qara Qoyunlu forces (left) in battle against Timurid forces (right). 1430 Shahnama, Bodleian Library.

Upon Baysunghur's premature death in 1433, Ala al-Dawla, then sixteen years old, inherited his father's position as amir-e diwan, as well as his post as governor of Mazandaran, a strategic position and important in the empires defence against Uzbek tribes. However, the prince's focus appears to have been more on the affairs of the royal court rather than his official posting. The following year, he participated in his grandfather's third campaign in Azerbaijan against the Qara Qoyunlu. When Shah Rukh fell ill in 1444, Gawhar Shad, anticipating his death, pushed the powerful Amir Firuzshah to support Ala al-Dawla's succession to the throne, angering the other princes. When Shah Rukh recovered from his illness and learned of this, he rebuked Firuzshah, who was unable to bear the disgrace and subsequently died of illness.

== War of succession ==
Shah Rukh died of illness in his winter quarters in Rayy soon after putting down the revolt of another grandson, Sultan Muhammad, in March 1447. Gawhar Shad, who had been with him, quickly dispatched a message to Ala al-Dawla, who had been left as Shah Rukh's deputy in Herat, informing him of the sultan's death. However, whilst she and Abdal-Latif were escorting the body back to Herat for burial, the latter turned on his grandmother, taking both her and the corpse hostage. His reasons for this are uncertain, with it being possible that he was attempting to preempt Ala al-Dawla and advance his own claims to the throne. Alternatively, this may have been part of a pre-arranged plan to support the claims of his father Ulugh Beg, who was by this point Shah Rukh's last surviving son. Ala al-Dawla, who had been biding his time in Herat, declared himself sultan upon learning of the situation, and distributed his grandfather's treasury among the troops. The prince's soldiers then launched an attack against his renegade cousin, freeing the dowager empress and rescuing his grandfather's body, which he had buried in the Gawhar Shad Mausoleum in Herat. (Note: Shah Rukh was later reburied in the Gur-e-Amir in Samarqand by Ulugh Beg.)

Over the following few months, the various regions of the Timurid Empire were parcelled off by Shah Rukh's descendants, with the respective princes opting to remain cautious and defensive. During this time, Ala al-Dawla was in an enviable position, holding the wealthy region of Khorasan, which included his grandfather's former capital of Herat. In addition to this, he commanded the allegiance of most of Shah Rukh's nobles, as well as enjoying the favour of the influential dowager empress Gawhar Shad.

The hiatus ended in May when Ulugh Beg, who was ruling from Samarqand, took Abu Bakr, son of Muhammad Juki captive and stationed his own troops in Balkh, which had formerly been the latter's territory. When Ulugh Beg heard that Ala al-Dawla had gathered his army in a move to block him, his amir's advised him to make peace with his nephew. Ala al-Dawla, who had just learned that his brother Abul-Qasim Babur was making raids near Herat, agreed to the proposal, allowing Ulugh Beg to keep much of Abu Bakr's former territories. As Ala al-Dawla marched to Mashhad to confront his brother's forces, the amirs of both princes urged them to make an alliance, pointing out that Ulugh Beg was aiming for total conquest over his rivals. They agreed to a border at Khabushan and returned to their respective capitals.

In the winter of that year, Ala al-Dawla became embroiled in a quarrel with Abdal-Latif, who had been stationed in Balkh as his father's governor. Ala al-Dawla launched a campaign against his cousin and plundered the region. Ulugh Beg used this as a pretext to attack and together with Abdal-Latif, he launched an invasion against his nephew in the spring of 1448. The two armies met in Tarnab, where Ala al-Dawla was defeated, forcing him to withdraw to Abul-Qasim Babur in Astarabad. Mashhad was occupied by Ulugh Beg's forces, while Abdal-Latif conquered Herat. With this failure, Ala al-Dawla lost much support among his followers and never recovered his former pre-eminence. Even his grandmother Gawhar Shad appears to have doubted him, taking refuge instead with his brother Sultan Muhammad in Isfahan, bringing with her many of her relatives, nobles and a large number of troops.

== Conflict with his brothers ==
By February 1449, Abul-Qasim Babur had gained control of Herat, having earlier inflicted a defeat on Ulugh Beg. Though Ala al-Dawla was still with him at this point, Abul-Qasim Babur was now undoubtedly the more prominent of the two. In spite of this, Ala al-Dawla still remained a threat due to his popularity among the population of Khorasan as well as his receiving their grandmother's continued favour. Abul-Qasim Babur therefore opted to imprison him alongside his son Ibrahim.

However, Ala al-Dawla soon escaped, fleeing first to Ghur and then to Sistan. When his brother continued to pursue him, he retreated to Yazd, then held by Sultan Muhammad. Ala al-Dawla, alongside Gawhar Shad, encouraged Sultan Muhammad to march on Herat, which resulted in the defeat of Abul-Qasim Babur's forces and the capture of the city. Like his brother, Sultan Muhammad was concerned by Ala al-Dawla's continued support in the region and sent him away to Kabul to act as governor. However, by 1451 Ala al-Dawla had gained the support of the Arlat tribe, with whom he had marriage ties, allowing him to make another attempt for the throne. Whilst Sultan Muhammad was absent fighting their brother, Ala al-Dawla took control of Herat with the aid of the city's population. Sultan Muhammad, then facing an insurgency amongst his nobles, was unable to counteract this, instead being forced to devote resources to reestablishing his control over his central territories. However, Abul-Qasim Babur used this opportunity to attempt to retake Herat himself. On his approach Ala al-Dawla retreated to Balkh, though even in his absence it required a long siege by Abul-Qasim Babur to gain the city's surrender.

In June of that year, Ala al-Dawla made a bid to capture Samarqand from Abdallah Mirza, who had taken the city following the deaths of Ulugh Beg and Abdal-Latif. Ala al-Dawla seized the cities of Shapurqan, Balkh and Hisar, from where he planned to launch his invasion. Abdallah marched out from Shahrisabz to meet him, though both armies separated without fighting, with each ruler returning to their respective cities. Ala al-Dawla then followed with another attempt to take Herat, this time while in league with the Qara Qoyunlu, which also failed. This resulted in him being blinded by Abul-Qasim Babur as punishment.

== Final years and death ==
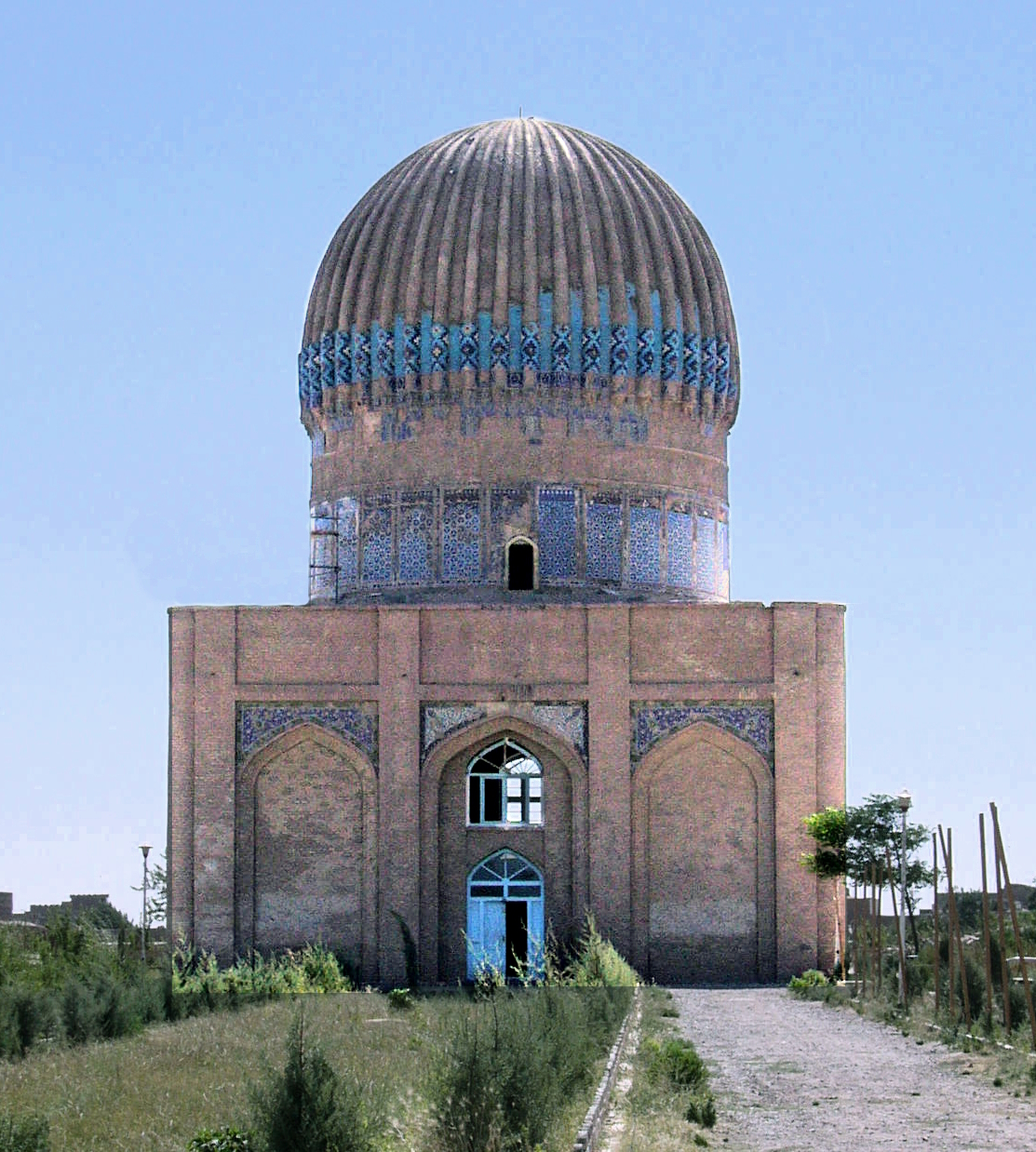
Ala al-Dawla Mirza was buried in the Gawhar Shad Mausoleum in Herat

In the following years, Abdallah Mirza was executed by Abu Sa'id Mirza, a grandson of Shah Rukh's elder brother Miran Shah, while Sultan Muhammad was killed by Abul-Qasim Babur, who himself died in 1457. The latter's successor, his eleven-year-old son Mahmud, was driven out of Herat by Ala al-Daula's son Ibrahim after a rule of only a few weeks. However, Ibrahim himself fled upon the approach of Abu Sa'id in July of that year, though the latter failed in capturing the city. These conflicts attracted the attention of Jahan Shah, the ruler of the Qara Qoyunlu, who defeated Ibrahim near Astarabad, forcing him to withdraw to Herat, where he was soon joined by Ala al-Dawla and his forces. However, neither had the strength to resist Jahan Shah and were forced to abandon the city, which was captured in June 1458.

The following spring, the two princes made an alliance with Sultan Sanjar, who was a grandson of Shah Rukh's eldest brother Umar Shaikh, against Abu Sa'id. The two forces met in the Battle of Sarakhs, where Abu Sa'id emerged victorious. While Sultan Sanjar was captured and executed, Ala al-Dawla and his son escaped, though Ibrahim died only a few months later. Ala al-Dawla himself died in 1460, while in exile in the Caspian province of Rostamdar. He was buried in the Gawhar Shad Mausoleum complex in Herat.

== Family ==
=== Wives ===
- Zaynab, daughter of Yadigar Shah Arlat
- Murad Sultan Agha, daughter of Barat Khwaja Bakhshi

=== Issue ===
- Baysunghur Mirza (1435 – 1456) (by Zaynab)
- Ibrahim Mirza (1440 – 1459) (by Murad Sultan Agha)
- Ruqaya Sultan Begum – married Abu Sa'id Mirza
- Shahzade
