= Mughal war of succession (1712–1720) =

Mughal war of succession (1712–1720) refers to the war between the four sons of Bahadur Shah I; Jahandar Shah, Azim-ush-Shan, Rafi-ush-Shan and Jahan Shah.

The war ended after Muhammad Shah, the grandson of Bahadur Shah I, was installed by Sayyid brothers in 1719. Sayyid brothers were assassinated in the subsequent years after Muhammad Shah took the help of Nizam-ul-Mulk, Asaf Jah I in order to get rid of them.
