= Sadabad, Nishapur =

Sadabad سعداباد
- Village
- Location within Iran
- Coordinates: 36°10′47″N 58°52′15″E
- Country: Iran
- Province: Razavi Khorasan
- County: Nishapur
- Bakhsh: Central
- Rural District: Fazl

Population (2006)
  - Total: 404
- Time zone: UTC+3:30 (IRST)
  - Summer (DST): UTC+4:30 (IRDT)

Sadabad (Persian: سعداباد, also Romanized as Sa‘dābād; also known as Sa‘adābād) is a village in Fazl Rural District, in the Central District of Nishapur County, Razavi Khorasan Province, Iran. At the 2006 census, its population was 404, in 124 families.
