= Persian war of succession =

Persian war of succession may refer to:

- Persian war of succession (404–401 BCE) ending with the Battle of Cunaxa, after the death of Darius II of the Achaemenid Empire
- Parthian war of succession (57–54 BCE), between Mithridates IV and his brother Orodes II after killing their father, king Phraates III of the Parthian Empire
  - The Roman invasion of Parthia in 54 BCE, ending catastrophically at the Battle of Carrhae in 53 BCE, was partially motivated by or justified as supporting Mithridates' claim to the Parthian throne
- Parthian wars of succession between Vologases III, Osroes I, Parthamaspates, Mithridates V and Vologases IV (105–147), after the death of king Pacorus II of Parthia
  - Trajan's Parthian campaign (115–117), the intervention of the Roman emperor Trajan in favour of Parthamaspates
- Dynastic struggle between Vologases VI and Artabanus IV (213–222), after the death of their father Vologases V of Parthia
  - Parthian war of Caracalla (216–217), Roman intervention in the Parthian dynastic struggle against Artabanus IV
- Sasanian war of succession (457–459) between Hormizd III and Peroz I after the death of their father, shahanshah Yazdegerd II of the Sasanian Empire
- Persian or Iranian Wars of Succession (1725–1796)
  - Safavid war of succession (1725–1729), after a Hotak invasion and the imprisonment of shah Sultan Husayn of Safavid Persia
  - Afsharid war of succession (1747–1757), after the death of shah Nadir Shah of Afsharid Persia
  - Zand war of succession (1779–1796), after the death of Karim Khan of Zand Persia

== See also ==
- Mughal war of succession (disambiguation)
- Roman–Parthian War or War of the Armenian Succession (54–66), caused by the death of Roman emperor Claudius, after which the rival pretender Tiridates was installed by king Vologases I of Parthia, unacceptable to new emperor Nero
