= Sultan Muhammad (Timurid) =

Sultan of the Timurid Empire in Persia and Fars

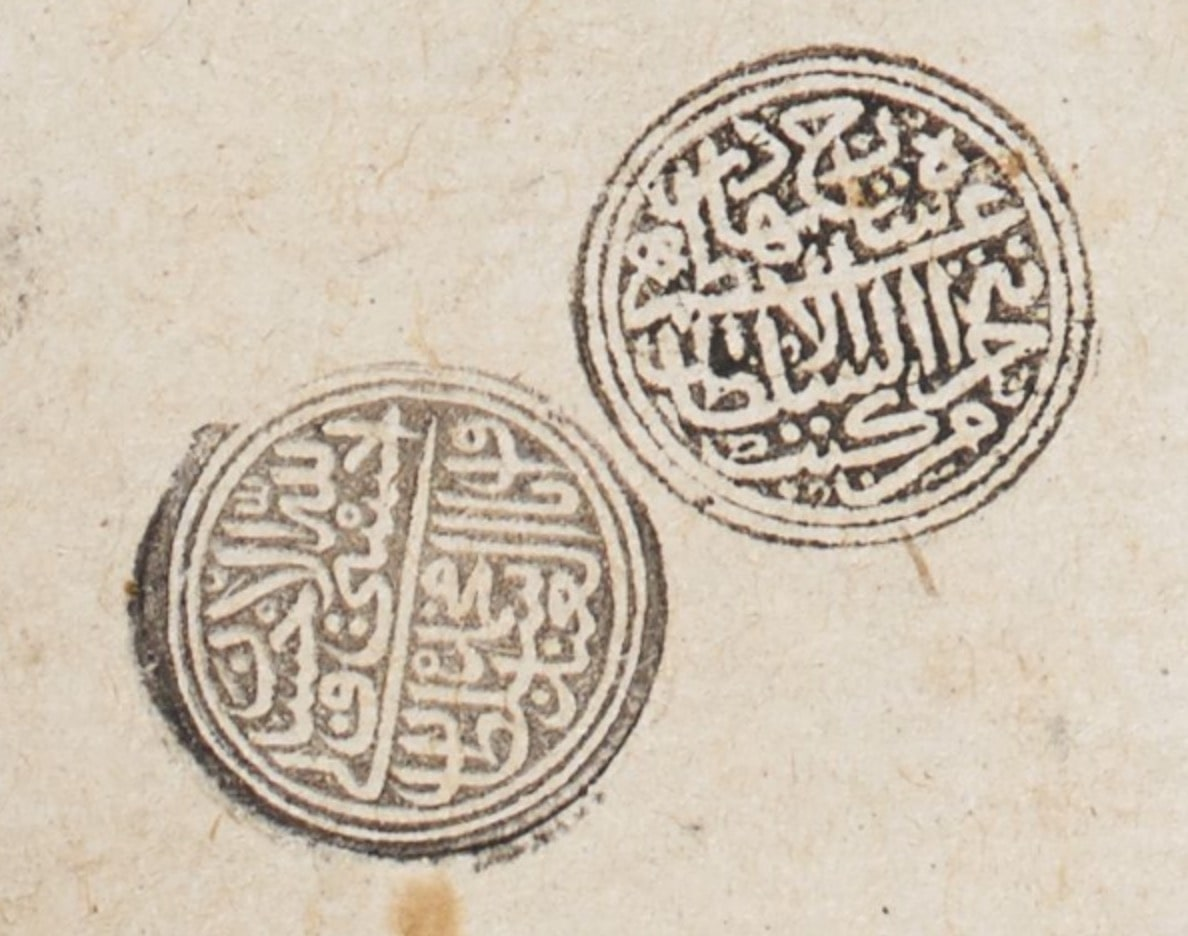
- Seals of Shahrukh and Muhammad Sultan in the manuscript of "Jāmi' al-Tavārīkh".

Sultan of the Timurid Empire in Fars
- Reign: 1447–1451
- Predecessor: Shah Rukh
- Successor: Abul-Qasim Babur Mirza
- Born: c.1418
- Died: 1452 (aged 33–34)
- Burial: Gawhar Shad Mausoleum, Herat
- Issue: Yadgar Muhammad Mirza
- House: Timurid dynasty
- Father: Baysunghur
- Mother: Khandan Agha

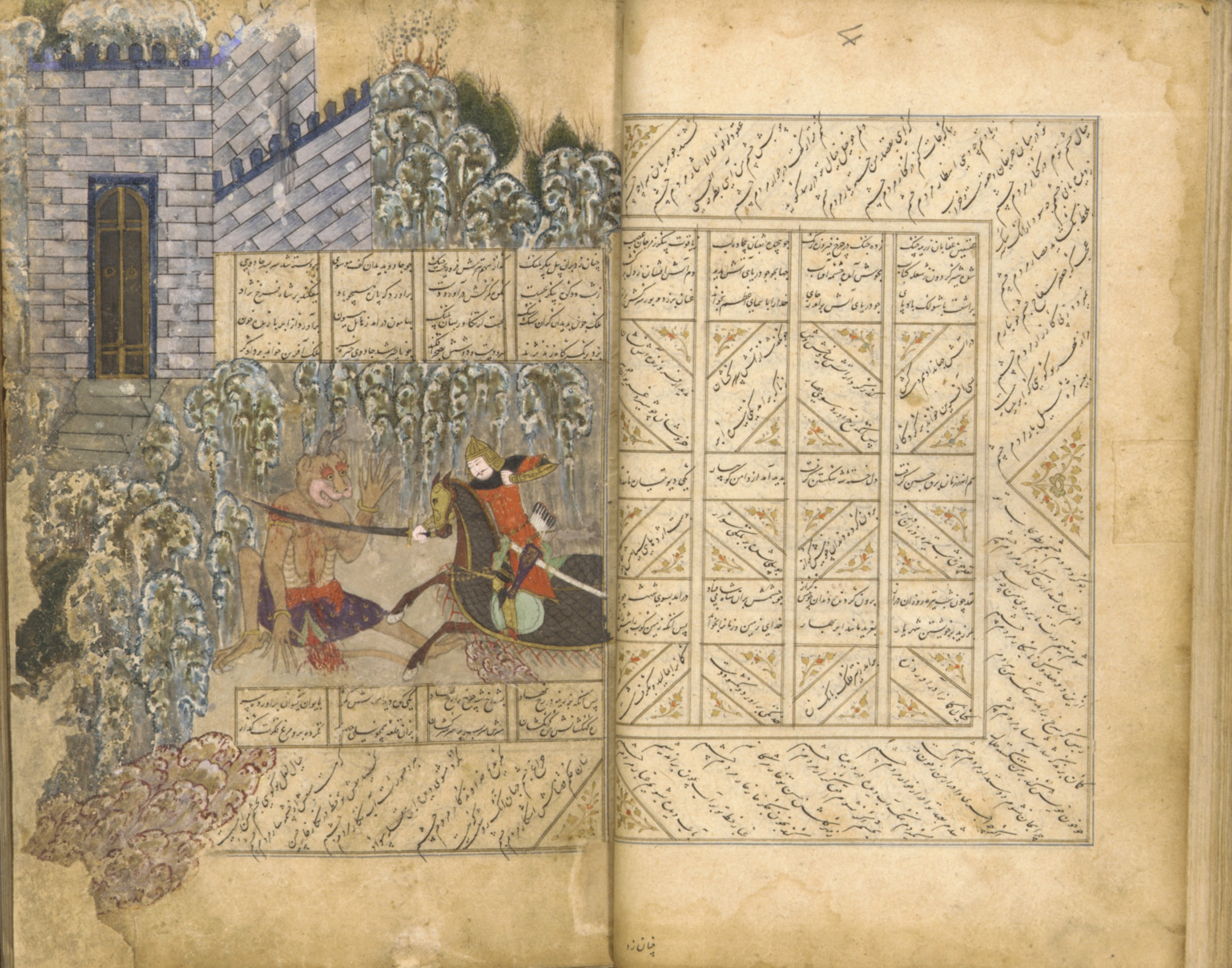
Khamsa and Divan of Khwaju Kirmani (1438, Shiraz)

Sultan Muhammad (Persian: سلطان محمد; c.1418 – 1452) was the Timurid ruler of Persia and Fars from around 1447 until his death. He was the son of Baysunghur son of Shah Rukh.

During the last years of his grandfather Shah Rukh's reign, Sultan Muhammad raised a revolt in the western provinces of the Timurid Empire. Shah Rukh was able to stop the revolt and capture many of its supporters in 1446, but Sultan Muhammad took refuge in Luristan. Following Shah Rukh's death, Sultan Muhammad returned from Luristan, and took control of central Persia and Fars (Shiraz) from 1447 to around 1451.

Together with his half-brother Abul-Qasim Babur Mirza of Khurasan and uncle Ulugh Beg of Transoxiana, he became one of the three most powerful rulers of the splintering Timurid empire.

Sultan Muhammad, eager to expand his domain, soon started a war with Mirza Abul-Qasim Babur and invaded Khurasan. At first the campaign went well; in 1450 he defeated his brother at Mashhad, following which the latter yielded some of his lands to him. Things soon turned south, however, and he was captured by Mirza Abul-Qasim Babur, who had him executed. From 1451 Mirza Abul-Qasim Babur then took over Sultan Muhammad's territories, but soon lost them to the Qara Qoyunlu Turkmen under Jahan Shah. His son was Yadgar Muhammad Mirza, who would become ruler of Khorasan for 6 weeks.

== Personal life ==
Wives

- Agha Begi, daughter of Yusuf Tarkhan
- Tundi Begi
- Tutuq 'Ismat, daughter of Jahan Shah, ruler of the Qara Qoyunlu

Issue

- Yadgar Muhammad Mirza (by Tundi Begi)
- Ulugh Agha (by Agha Begi)

Preceded by Shah Rukh	Timurid dynasty (in central Persia); 1447–1451	Succeeded by Abul-Qasim Babur Mirza
