= Timurid wars of succession =

15th and 16th century succession wars in the Timurid Empire

The Timurid wars of succession were a set of three wars of succession in Central Asia waged between princes (amirs) of the Timurid Empire during the 15th century and early 16th century following deaths of important monarchs.

- First Timurid War of Succession (1405–1409/11), after the death of Timur
- Second Timurid war of succession (1447–1459), after the death of Shahrukh Mirza
- Third Timurid war of succession (1469–1507), after the death of Abu Sa'id Mirza

== See also ==
- Mughal war of succession (disambiguation)
- Persian war of succession (disambiguation)
