= Abul-Qasim Babur Mirza =

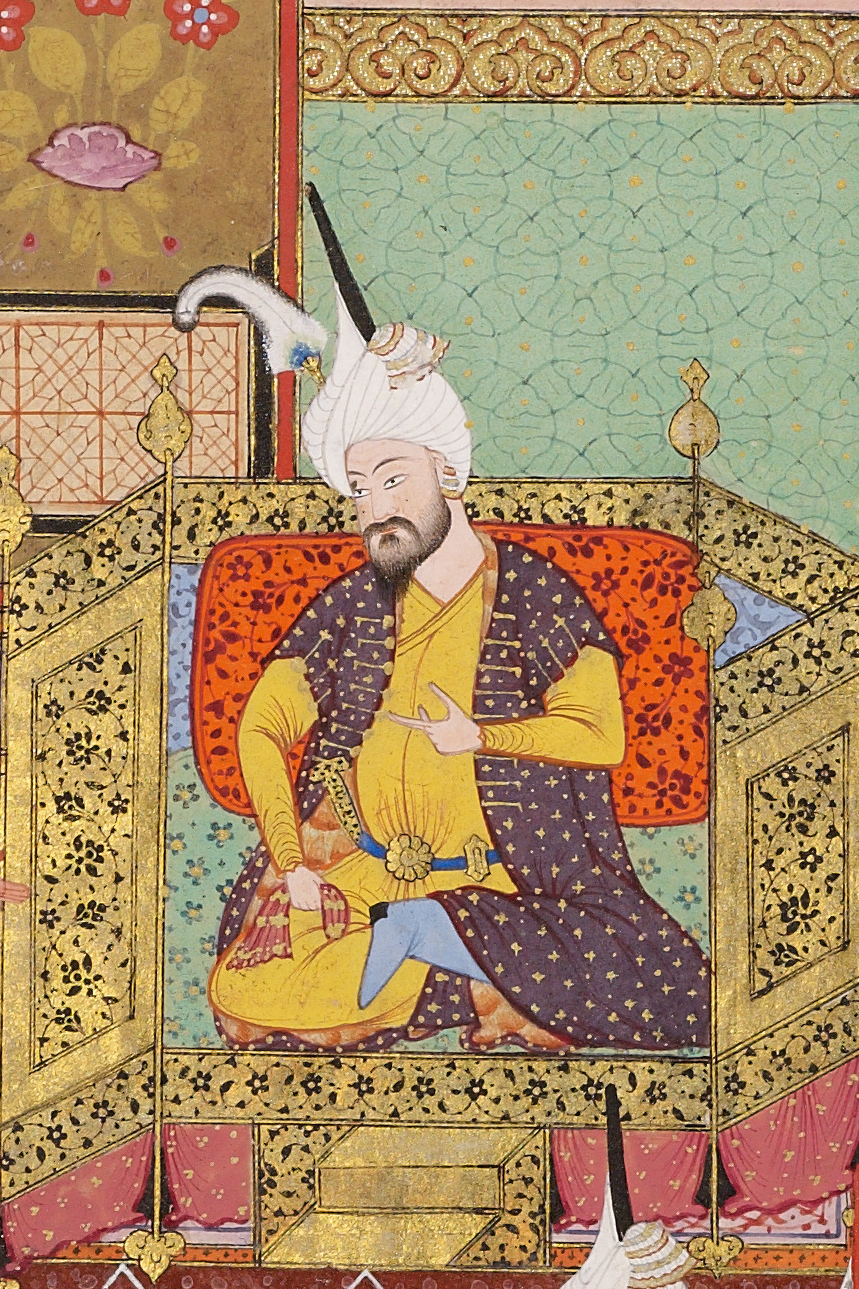
- 1552 Safavid depiction of Abu’l-Qasem Babor son of Baysonghor. The Bodleian Libraries, MS Ouseley Add. 24, fol. 174r

Timurid Ruler
- Reign: 1449–1457
- Predecessor: Ulugh Beg
- Successor: Mirza Shah Mahmud
- Born: 7 June 1422
- Died: 1457 (aged 34–35); Mashhad, Timurid Empire (present-day Iran)
- Burial: Imam Reza shrine, Mashhad
- Spouse: Daulat Sultan Begum; Begi Jan Agha; Kanizak Begi Agha
- Issue: Sultan Mahmud unnamed daughter
- House: House of Timur
- Father: Baysunghur Mirza
- Mother: Gawhar Nasab Agha Khwarizmi
- Religion: Islam

Abul-Qasim Babur Mirza (Persian: ابوالقاسم بابر میرزا بن بایسنقر بیگ), was a Timurid ruler in Khurasan (1449–1457). He was the son of Ghiyath-ud-din Baysunghur ibn Shah Rukh Mirza, and thus a great-grandson of Amir Timur.

Babur was one of the many people involved in the succession struggle that took place during Shah Rukh's last years. Together with Khalil Sultan (a great-great-grandson of Timur), he plundered the baggage-train of the army and then made his way to Khurasan. Meanwhile, Ulugh Beg also invaded Khurasan in 1448 in an attempt to defeat Ala al-Dawla Mirza, who held Herat. Ulugh Beg defeated him at Tarnab and took Mashhad, while his son Abdal-Latif Mirza conquered Herat. Ala al-Dawla Mirza fled to south-western Afghanistan. However, Ulugh Beg felt Transoxiana, where he had already ruled for decades, to be more important, and soon left the area. On the way back, Babur sent a force that inflicted heavy losses on his army.

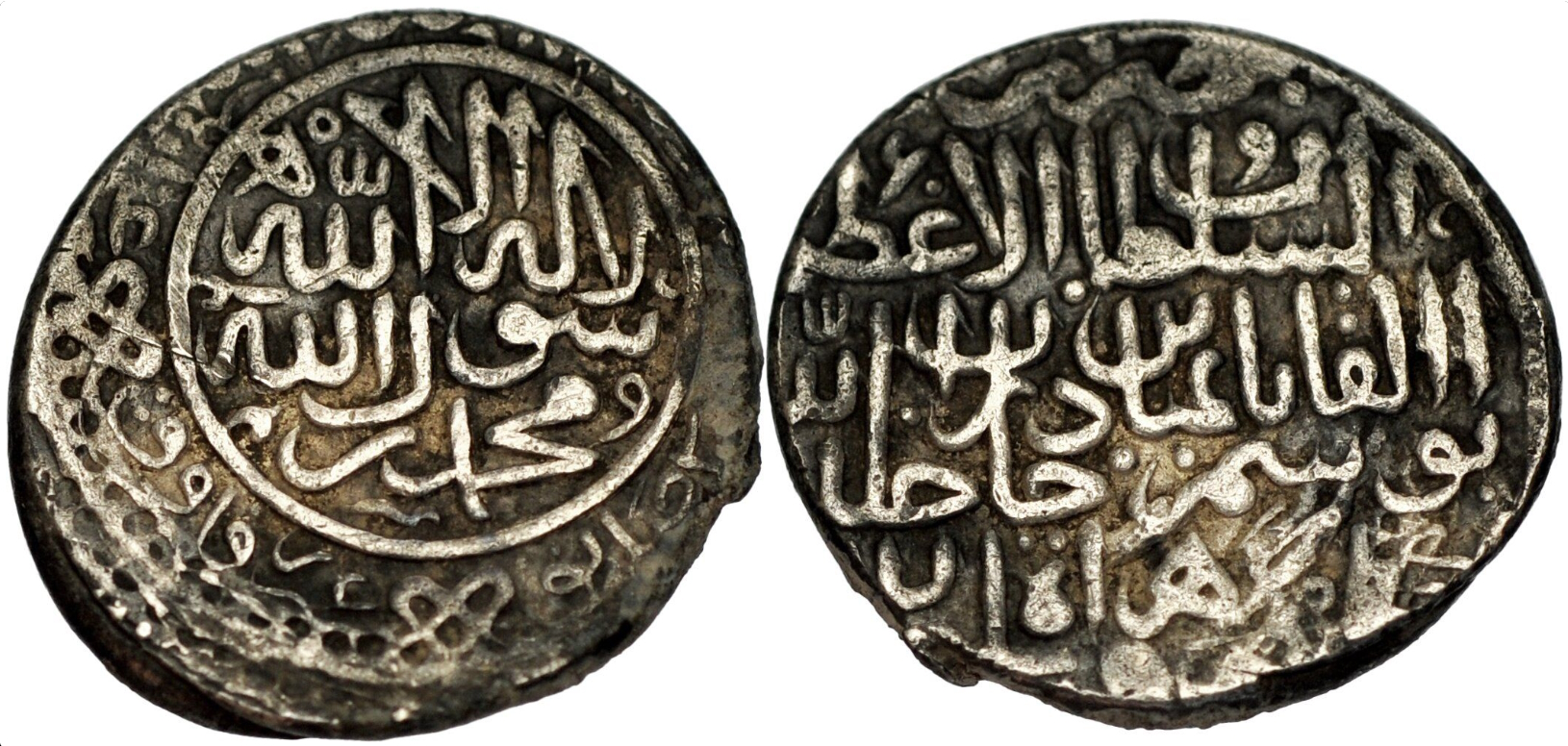
Coinage of Abu'l-Qasim Babur. Harat mint. Dated AH 860 (1455-6)

With a power vacuum now in Khurasan, Babur quickly seized control. Mashad and Herat fell to him in 1449. Ala al-Dawla Mirza occasionally raided the area but was not a significant factor. Together with Ulugh Beg and Sultan Muhammad (who gained control of central Persia), Babur became one of the three important Timurid rulers. This balance of power was soon upset by Sultan Muhammad, who invaded Khurasan. The campaign started out badly for Babur, with a defeat at Mashad in March 1450 convinced him to cede parts of his territory. However, Babur soon recovered and took Sultan Muhammad prisoner, and then executed him. He then marched to Shiraz to take control of Sultan Muhammad's lands.

At this point, Jahan Shah of the Black Sheep Turkmen ended his loyalty to the Timurids. He quickly put Qum and Saveh to siege. Babur began to march against him but was forced to return to Herat, due to the overwhelming superiority of the Black Sheep's armies and a plot hatched against him by Ala al-Dawla Mirza. Most of Persia was taken from the Timurids by 1452, with the exception of Abarquh, which was conquered by the Black Sheep in 1453. While Kirman was temporarily conquered some time later and a few attempts were made to seize Ray, Persia as a whole was never retaken by the Timurids.

In 1454, Babur invaded Transoxiana, then under the control of Abu Sa'id Mirza in retaliation for the latter's seizure of Balkh. He quickly laid siege to Samarkand. The conflict between the two soon ended, however, with the Oxus River agreed to as the border. This remained in effect until Babur's death in 1457. He was succeeded by his son Mahmud.

== Personal life ==
Babur had three consorts:

- Daulat Sultan Begum, daughter of Abu Sa'id Darughe, mother of Sultan Mahmud Mirza;
- Begi Jan Agha, daughter of Khudaidad;
- Kanizak Begi Agha, mother of a daughter;

== Sources ==
- Peter Jackson (1986). The Cambridge History of Iran, Volume Six: The Timurid and Safavid Periods. ISBN 0-521-20094-6

Abul-Qasim Babur Mirza Timurid dynasty
Preceded by Ulugh Beg	Timurid Empire (in Herat); 1449–1457	Succeeded by Mirza Shah Mahmud
