= Amir Taraghai =

Emir of Barlas under the Chagatai Khanate

Amir Taraghai, Amir Taraghai Noyan, Taraghai Noyan, Taraghai Barlas or, Amir Taraghai of Barulas (b. 1290/1300 – d. 12 March 1360 C.E.) was a lesser emir of the Turco-Mongol Barlas tribal confederation in Transoxiana region, under the Chagatai Khanate.

He was serving as minor noblemen of Chagatai Khans court's, he was more famously known as Islamized men who following his spiritual lifestyles as Sufi, and follow and practice Naqshbandi orders more, rather than his semi-nomad tribal kinsmens who were living militaristic lives. He was also the father of the Central Asian Turco-Mongol conqueror Timur, who founded Timurid Empire in 1370, and he was also the great-grandfather of the Timurid Sultan, astronomer and mathematician Ulugh Beg, who ruled Central Asia from 1411 to 1449, and the great-great-great-great-grandfather of Babur (1483–1530), founder of the Mughal Empire.

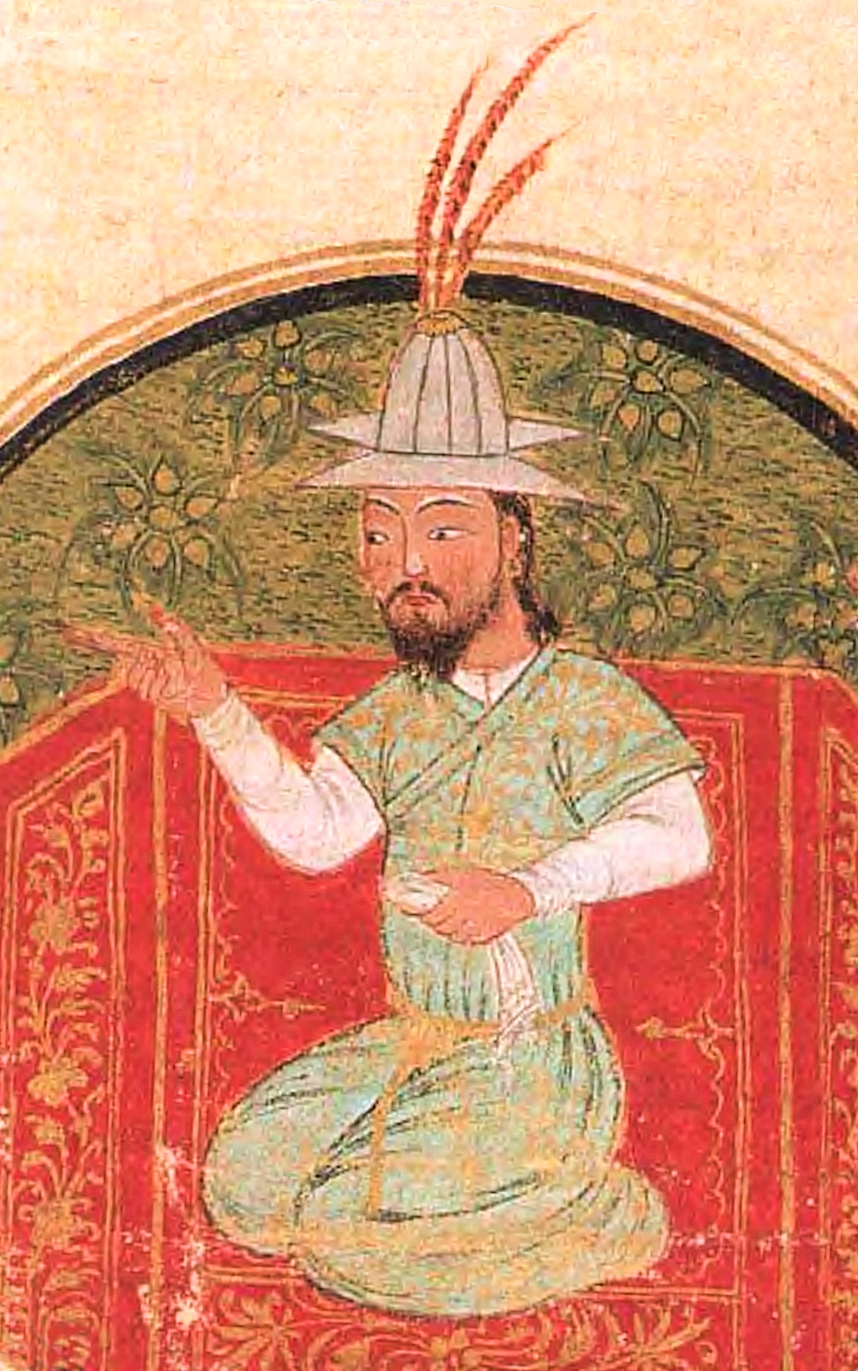
Timur was the son of Amir Taraghai. Earliest known portrait of Timur, commissioned right after his death in 1405–1409.

Taraghai was described as a minor noble of this tribe. However, Manz argues that Timur may have later understated his father's social position to make his own successes appear more remarkable. She states that though he is not believed to have been especially powerful, Taraghai was reasonably wealthy and influential. This is shown in the Zafarnama, which states that Timur later returning to his birthplace following the death of his father on 12 March 1360 AD, suggesting concern over his estate. Taraghai's social significance is further hinted at by Arabshah, who described him as a magnate in the court of Amir Husayn Qara'unas. In addition to this, the father of the great Amir Hamid Kereyid of Moghulistan is stated as a friend of Taraghai's.

Amir Taraghai was married to Tekina Khatun, who, according to the Timurids, was a descendant of Genghis Khan. He had total four sons and two daughters, one of them being Kutlug Turkan‑Aga, whose mausoleum is visible in Samarkand, the Turkan Ago Mausoleum, where he was buried with her daughter Shad‑i Mulk Aga.

== Sources ==
- Banarsi Prasad Saksena (1992) [1970]. "The Khaljis: Alauddin Khalji". In Mohammad Habib and Khaliq Ahmad Nizami (ed.). A Comprehensive History of India: The Delhi Sultanat (A.D. 1206-1526). Vol. 5 (Second ed.). The Indian History Congress / People's Publishing House. OCLC 31870180.
