= Tekina Khatun =

Tekina Khatun was the mother of Timur, founder of the Timurid Empire. Her husband was Amir Taraghai, a lesser emir of a Turco-Mongol Barlas Confederation.

According to the Timurids, Tekina Khatun was a descendant of Genghis Khan.
