= Gürkan =

Gürkan is a Turkish surname and given name for males.

== People named Gürkan or Gurkan ==
=== Given name ===
- Gürkan Coşkun (1941–2022), Turkish painter
- Gürkan Ekren (born 1974), Turkish football player
- Gürkan Sermeter (born 1974), Swiss football player of Turkish descent
- Gürkan Uygun (born 1974), Turkish actor

=== Nickname ===
- Gustav Björkman (born 1986), Swedish retired bandy player

=== Surname ===
- Aydın Güven Gürkan (1941–2006), Turkish academic and politician
- Cevat Gürkan (1907–1984), Turkish equestrian
- Emrah Safa Gürkan (born 1981), Turkish historian and academic
- Fatoş Gürkan (born 1966), Turkish lawyer and politician
- Recep Gürkan (born 1964), Turkish politician
- Selma Gürkan (born 1961), Turkish unionist and politician
- Umut A. Gurkan, Turkish–American engineer

== As a title ==
Gurkan is a Persianized form of the Mongolian word "kuragan" (or guregen) meaning "son-in-law". This was an honorific title used by the Timurid dynasty as the Timurids were in-laws of the line of Genghis Khan, founder of the Mongol Empire, as Timur had married Saray Mulk Khanum, a direct descendant of Genghis Khan.
