= Siege of Sarai (1395) =

Siege during the Tokhtamysh–Timur war

- Part of the Tokhtamysh–Timur war
Date	1395
Location	Golden Horde, near Caspian Sea, Sarai
Result	Timurid victory

Belligerents
Golden Horde	Timurid Empire

Commanders and leaders
Tokhtamysh	Timur

The siege of Sarai (1395) occurred during the winter season when the forces of Tamerlane, the leader of the Timurid Empire marched to the mouth of Volga, then continued to Sarai which sieged the city. This is subjected as partially one of the four campaigns that Timur launched in the same year of 1395, others being the Astrakhan, Shirvan and Terek.

It concluded as a Timurid victory, leading to the conquest of Sarai and its integration into the Timurid Empire.

== Aftermath ==
After the siege, most of the skilled craftsmen from Sarai were deported to Central Asia, hence depriving the Horde of its systemic advantages over the resurgent Muscovy, which would assert their independence in later years.
