= Timur =

Turco-Mongol conqueror (1320s–1405)

- Beg; Sultan; Güregen (Note: To legitimize his rule, Timur claimed the title güregen (lit. 'royal son-in-law') to a princess of Chinggisid line.); Ghazi
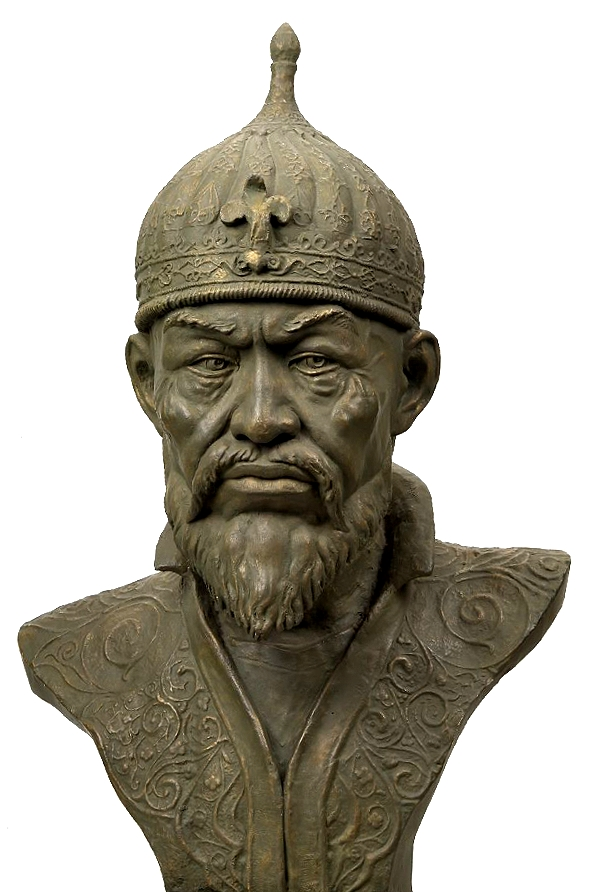
- Facial reconstruction from Timur's skull, by Mikhail Mikhaylovich Gerasimov

Amir of the Timurid Empire
- Reign: 9 April 1370 – 18 February 1405
- Coronation: 9 April 1370, Balkh
- Successor: Khalil Sultan
- Born: 1320s near Kesh, Chagatai Khanate
- Died: 17/18 February 1405; Farab, Timurid Empire
- Burial: Gur-e-Amir
- Consort: Saray Mulk Khanum
- Wives: Chulpan Mulk Agha; Aljaz Turkhan Agha; Tukal Khanum; Dil Shad Agha; Touman Agha
- Issue Detail: Umar Shaikh Mirza I; Jahangir Mirza I; Miran Shah; Shah Rukh
Names
- Shuja-ud-din Timur
Regnal name
- Sahib-e-Qiran Amir Timur Gurqani
- Dynasty: Timurid
- Father: Amir Taraghai
- Mother: Tekina Khatun
- Religion: Sunni Islam
- Military career
- Conflicts: Timurid wars (1370-1405); Rise to power; Battle of Tashkent; Siege of Balkh; Siege of Urgench; Conquest of Persia; Siege of Herat (1381); Siege of Isfahan (1387); Battle of Shiraz (1393); Tokhtamysh-Timur war; Battle of the Kondurcha River; Battle of the Terek River; Siege of Astrakhan (1395); Siege of Sarai (1395); Siege of Baghdad (1393); Timur's invasion of Georgia; Siege of Tbilisi (1386); Siege of Birtvisi (1403); Timur's South Georgia Campaign; Siege of Alinja; Timur's campaigns in Dagestan; Battle of Ushkudzhe; Battle of Khankala (1395); Timur's invasion of India; Siege of Multan (1398); Sack of Delhi (1398); Timur's invasion of Levant; Sack of Aleppo (1400); Siege of Damascus (1400); Siege of Baghdad (1401); Timur's invasion of Anatolia; Sack of Sebaste (1400); Battle of Ankara; Siege of Smyrna

Timur (Note: /tɪˈmʊər/ tim-OOR; Chagatay: تیمور, romanized: Temür, lit. 'Iron'. Sometimes romanized Taimur or Temur.) (1320s – 17/18 February 1405), also known as Tamerlane, (Note: /ˈtæmərleɪn/ TAM-ər-layn; Persian: تيمور لنگ, romanized: Temūr(-i) Lang; Chagatay: اقساق تیمور, romanized: Aqsaq Temür, lit. 'Timur the Lame'. Historically best known as Amir Timur or by his epithet Sahib-i-Qiran (lit. 'Lord of the Auspicious Conjunction').) was a Turco-Mongol conqueror, first ruler of the Timurid dynasty, and the founder of the Timurid Empire, which ruled over modern-day Afghanistan, Iran, and Central Asia. He was undefeated in most battles and is widely regarded as one of the greatest military leaders and tacticians in history, as well as one of the most brutal and deadly. Timur is also considered a great patron of the arts, for he interacted with scholars and poets such as ibn Khaldun, Hafez, and Hafiz-i Abru. His reign led to the Timurid Renaissance.

Born into the Turkicized Mongol confederation of the Barlas in Transoxiana (now in Uzbekistan) in the 1320s, Timur gained control of the western Chagatai Khanate by 1370 and from there he led a series of military campaigns defeating the Khans of the Golden Horde, the Mamluk Sultanate in Egypt and Syria, the emerging Ottoman Empire, as well as the Delhi Sultanate in the Indian subcontinent, thus becoming the most powerful ruler in the Muslim world. These conquests led to the creation of the Timurid Empire, which fragmented shortly after his death. He spoke several languages, including the Karluk Turkic language Chagatai (an ancestor of modern Uzbek and Uyghur), as well as Classical Mongolian and New Persian, which he used for diplomatic correspondence.

Timur was the last of the major nomadic conquerors of the Eurasian Steppe, and his empire set the stage for the rise of the more organized and lasting Muslim gunpowder empires of the 16th and 17th centuries. Timur was of Mongol descent, and, while probably not a direct descendant on either side, he shared a common ancestor with Genghis Khan on his father's side, though some authors have suggested his mother may have been a descendant of the Khan. He clearly sought to revive the legacy of Genghis Khan and saw himself as the restorer of the Mongol Empire. According to Gérard Chaliand, Timur considered himself Genghis Khan's heir.

Timur referred to himself as the "Sword of Islam". He was a patron of religion and the arts, but styled himself a ghazi (Arabic: غازي, romanized: ghāzī, lit. 'religious warrior') in the last years of his life. By the end of his reign, Timur had gained complete control over all the remnants of the Chagatai Khanate, the Ilkhanate, and the Golden Horde, and had even attempted to restore the Yuan dynasty in China. Timur's armies were multi-ethnic and much feared, and laid waste to sizable parts of Asia, Africa, and Europe. Scholars estimate that his military campaigns caused the deaths of millions of people. Of all the areas he conquered, Khwarazm suffered the most, as it repeatedly rose against him.

He was the grandfather of the Timurid sultan, astronomer and mathematician Ulugh Beg, who ruled Central Asia from 1411 to 1449, and the great-great-great-grandfather of Babur (1483–1530), founder of the Mughal Empire.

== Ancestry ==
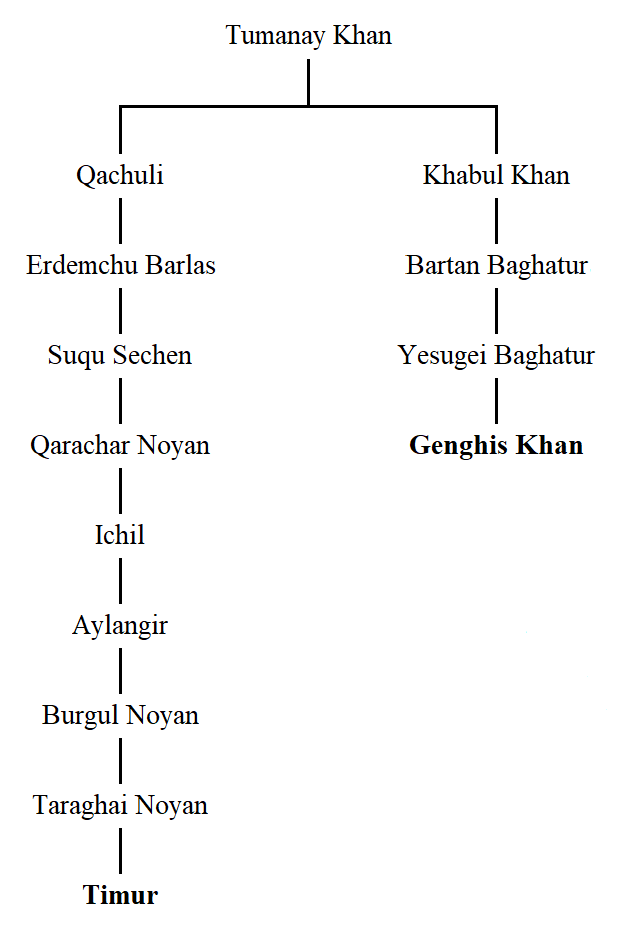
The genealogical relationship between Timur and Genghis Khan, according to Timurid sources

Historian Peter Jackson considers it generally accepted that Timur was of "unimpeachable Mongol ancestry". Timurid histories, such as Yazdi's Zafarnama, Hafiz-i Abru's Zubdat at-tawarikh, and the Muiz al-Ansab, trace his paternal descent from Tumbinai Khan, a male-line ancestor of Genghis Khan. However, while Rashid al-Din's Jami' al-tawarikh and the Secret History of the Mongols assign a common ancestry with Genghis Khan to Timur's tribe as a whole, no written evidence from Timur's lifetime or earlier makes such a link to him directly.

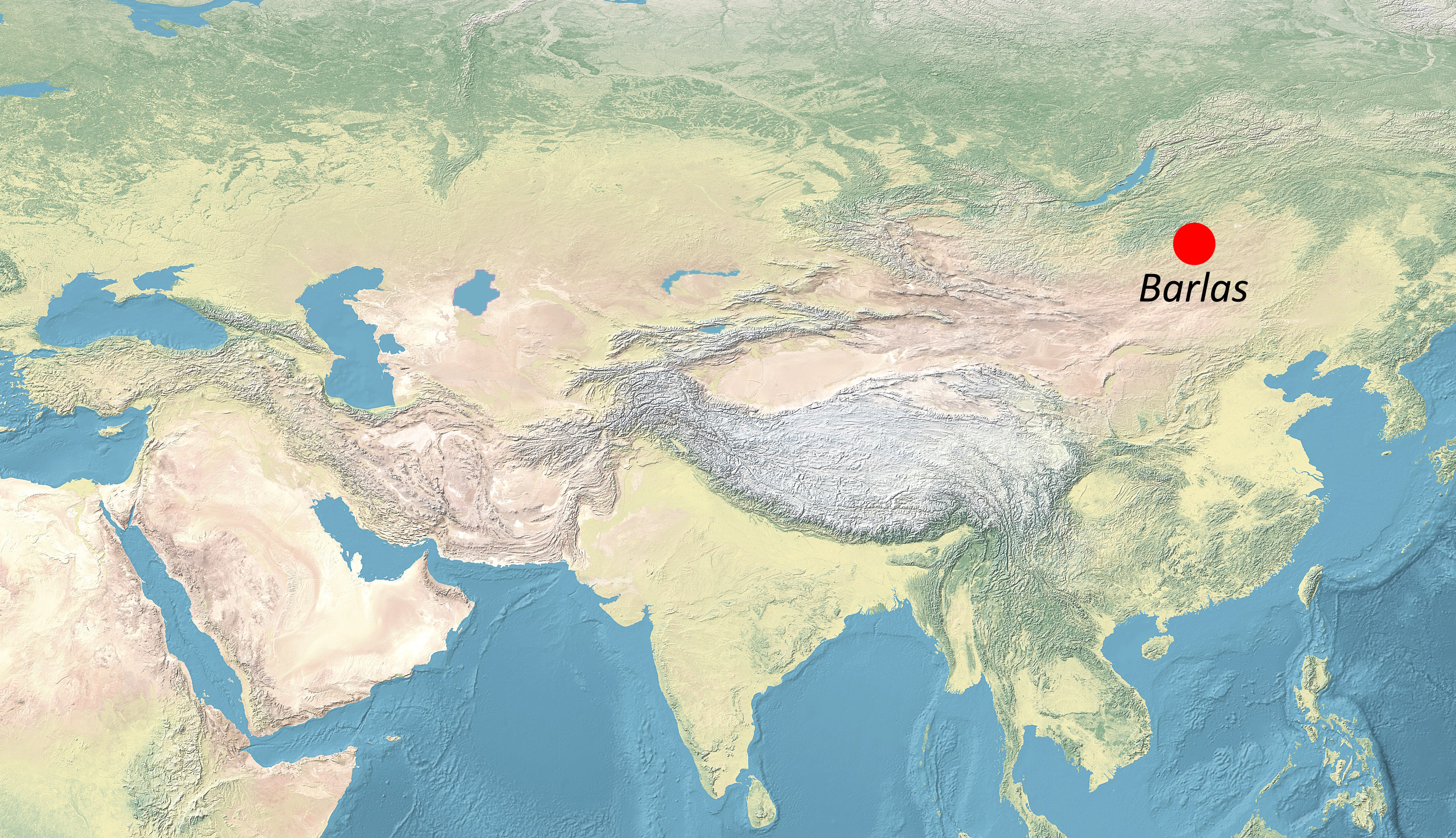
Original location of Timur's Mongol Barlas tribe

Timur's ancestor Qarachar Noyan, written in Timurid works as Tumanay's great-great-grandson, was a military commander under Genghis Khan, and was later assigned to the latter's son Chagatai in Transoxiana. Though there are not many mentions of Qarachar in 13th and 14th century records, later Timurid sources greatly emphasized his role in the early history of the Mongol Empire. These histories also state that Genghis Khan later established the "bond of fatherhood and sonship" by marrying Chagatai's daughter to Qarachar. Through his claimed descent from this marriage, Timur could assert kinship with the Chagatai Khans.

The Barlas had longstanding ties to the Chinggisid political order. Members of Timur's family had served its rulers from the thirteenth century onward, including in the imperial guard, while later generations also occupied military and administrative positions.

The origins of Timur's mother, Tekina Khatun, are less clear. The Zafarnama merely states her name without giving any information regarding her background. Writing in 1403, John III, Archbishop of Sultaniyya, claimed that she was of lowly origin. The Mu'izz al-Ansab, written decades later, says that she was related to the Yasa'uri tribe, whose lands bordered that of the Barlas. Ibn Khaldun recounted that Timur himself described to him his mother's descent from the legendary Persian hero Manuchehr. Ibn Arabshah suggested that she was a descendant of Genghis Khan. The 18th century Books of Timur identify her as the daughter of 'Sadr al-Sharia', which is believed to refer to the Hanafi scholar Ubayd Allah al-Mahbubi of Bukhara.

Practically all of Timur’s contemporaries identified him as a Mongol, including Ibn Khaldun, who personally met Timur in Damascus in 1401, the Arab historian Ibn Arabshah, and the Castilian envoy Ruy González de Clavijo, who met Timur in 1404. In his work describing his encounter with Timur, Ibn Khaldun refers to him as the "sultan of the Mongols (Mughul) and Tatars (Ṭaṭar)", and describes the language of his court as the "Mongol language (al-lisān al-Mughulī)". He also uses the term "Chaghatay" (Jaqatay) alongside the designation "Mongol" (Mughul) when referring to Timur and his commanders. Clavijo also reports that after the death of Chagatai Khan (r. 1227–1242), the Timurid nomads began calling themselves Chaghatays and that they traced their origins to the Mongols of Genghis Khan (Tartaros). Ibn Arabshah refers to Timur’s army as "Tatars" and, quoting Timur’s own words, portrays both him and the Qara Tatars, a surviving group of Ilkhanid Mongols who lived in Anatolia, as belonging to the same people. The term Mughul was never used in the contemporary sense to refer to a speaker of the Mongolian language. In the Zafarnama, the Mongols who lived in the territory of modern-day Mongolia at the turn of the 15th century are referred to as Qalmaq, not Mughul.

Nevertheless, Timur and his descendants (the Timurids) regarded themselves as belonging to the Mongol ulus and were perceived as such by their contemporaries. They identified themselves with the Chagatay Mongols, and those around them likewise recognized them as such. Timur’s Mongol identity was not constructed as an attempt to legitimize his rule; it reflected his ethnic origin and was a product of his Mongol descent.

== Early life ==
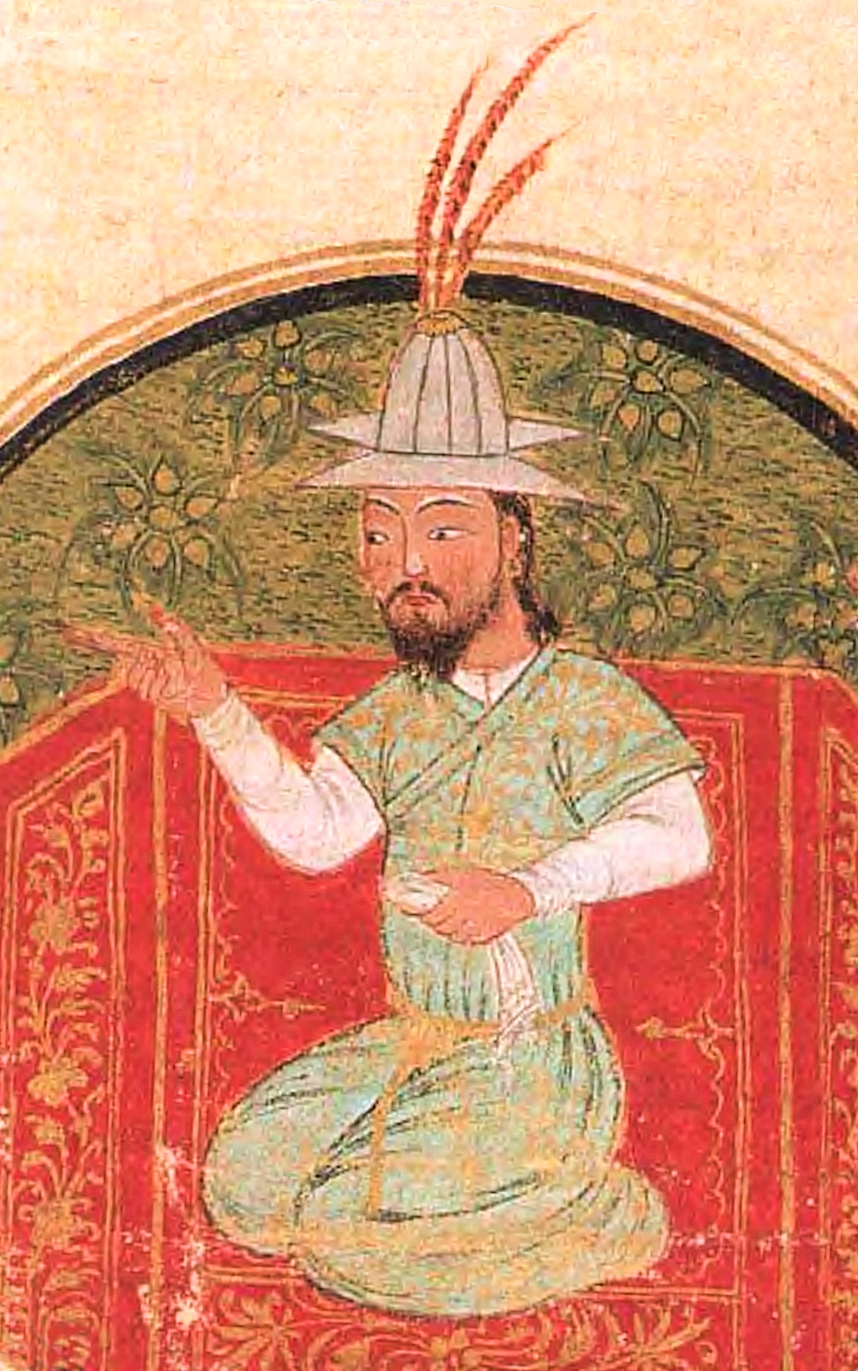
Earliest known portrait of Timur, commissioned right after his death in 1405–1409, by his grandson Khalil Sultan for an illustrated Timurid genealogy (TSMK, H2152).

Timur was born in Transoxiana near the city of Kesh (now Shahrisabz, Uzbekistan), some 80 kilometres (50 mi) south of Samarkand, part of what was then the Chagatai Khanate. His name, Temur, means "iron" in Chagatai, his mother tongue (cf. Uzbek Temir, Turkish Demir). It is likely cognate with Genghis Khan's birth name, Temüjin, a loan from Common Turkic *temürči(n) "blacksmith".

Later Timurid dynastic histories claim that Timur was born on 8 April 1336, but most sources from his lifetime give ages that are consistent with a birthdate in the late 1320s. Several scholars suspect that the 1336 date was intended to link Timur to the legacy of Abu Sa'id Bahadur Khan, the last ruler of the Ilkhanate and a descendant of Hulegu Khan, who died in that year.

Timur was a member of the Barlas, a Mongol tribe that had been turkified in many aspects. His father, Taraghai, was described as a minor noble of this tribe. However, Manz argues that Timur may have later understated his father's social position to make his own successes appear more remarkable. She states that though he is not believed to have been especially powerful, Taraghai was reasonably wealthy and influential. This is shown in the Zafarnama, which states that Timur later returned to his birthplace following the death of his father on 12 March 1360 AD, suggesting concern over his estate. Taraghai's social significance is further hinted at by Arabshah, who described him as a magnate in the court of Amir Husayn Qara'unas. In addition to this, the father of the great Amir Hamid Kereyid of Moghulistan is stated as a friend of Taraghai's.

In his childhood, Timur and a small band of followers raided travellers for goods, especially animals such as sheep, horses, and cattle. Around 1363, it is believed that Timur tried to steal a sheep from a shepherd but was shot by two arrows, one in his right leg and another in his right hand, where he lost two fingers. Both injuries disabled him for life. Some believe that these injuries occurred while serving as a mercenary to the khan of Sistan in what is today the Dasht-e Margo in southwest Afghanistan. Timur's injuries and disability gave rise to the nickname "Timur the Lame" or Temūr(-i) Lang in Persian, which is the origin of Tamerlane, the name by which he is generally known in the West.

== Military leader ==
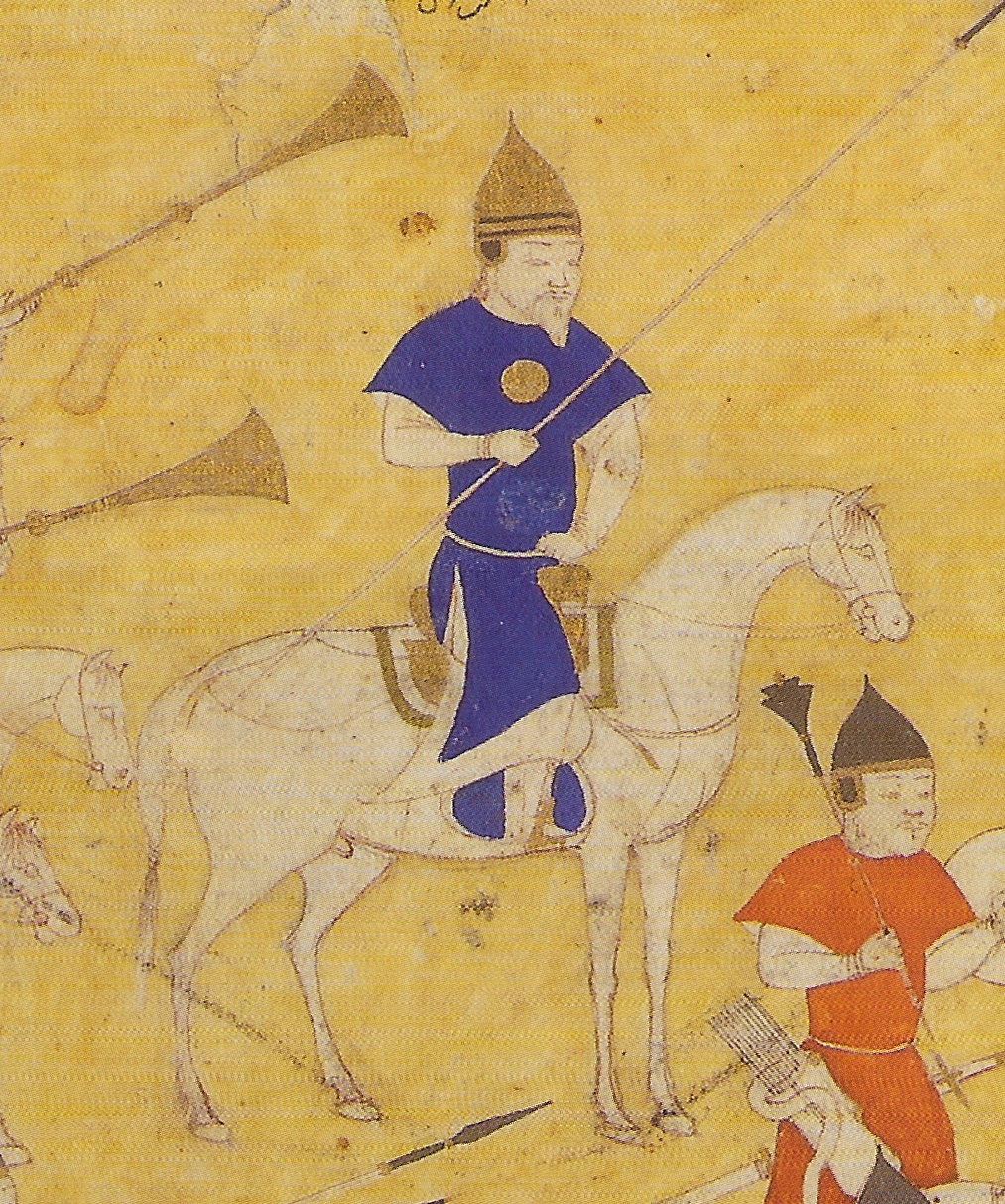
Timur on horse in a battle with Tokhtamysh, Khan of the Golden Horde. 1420–1440 manuscript (partially colored), possibly Herat. Topkapi H.2153

By about 1360, Timur had gained prominence as a military leader whose troops were mostly Turkic tribesmen of the region. He took part in campaigns in Transoxiana with the Khan of the Chagatai Khanate. Allying himself both in cause and by family connection with Amir Qazaghan, the dethroner and destroyer of Volga Bulgaria, he invaded Khorasan at the head of a thousand horsemen. This was the second military expedition that he led, and its success led to further operations, among them the subjugation of Khwarazm and Urgench in the Siege of Urgench (1379).

Following Qazaghan's murder, disputes arose among the many claimants to sovereign power. Tughlugh Timur of Kashgar, the Khan of the Eastern Chagatai Khanate, another descendant of Genghis Khan, invaded, interrupting this infighting. Timur was sent to negotiate with the invader but instead joined him and was rewarded with Transoxiana. Around this time, his father died, and Timur also became the chief of the Barlas. Tughlugh then attempted to set his son Ilyas Khoja over Transoxiana, but Timur repelled this invasion with a smaller force.

== Rise to power ==
In this period, Timur reduced the Chagatai khans to the position of figureheads while he ruled in their name. Also during this period, Timur and his brother-in-law Amir Husayn, who were at first fellow fugitives and wanderers, became rivals and antagonists. The relationship between them became strained after Husayn abandoned efforts to carry out Timur's orders to finish off Ilyas Khoja (former governor of Mawarannah) close to Tashkent.

Timur gained followers in Balkh, consisting of merchants, fellow tribesmen, Muslim clergy, aristocracy and agricultural workers, because of his kindness in sharing his belongings with them. This contrasted Timur's behavior with that of Husayn, who alienated these people, took many possessions from them via his heavy tax laws and selfishly spent the tax money building elaborate structures. Around 1370, Husayn surrendered to Timur and was later assassinated, which allowed Timur to be formally proclaimed sovereign at Balkh. He married Husayn's wife Saray Mulk Khanum, a descendant of Genghis Khan, allowing him to become imperial ruler of the Chaghatay tribe.

== Legitimization of Timur's rule ==
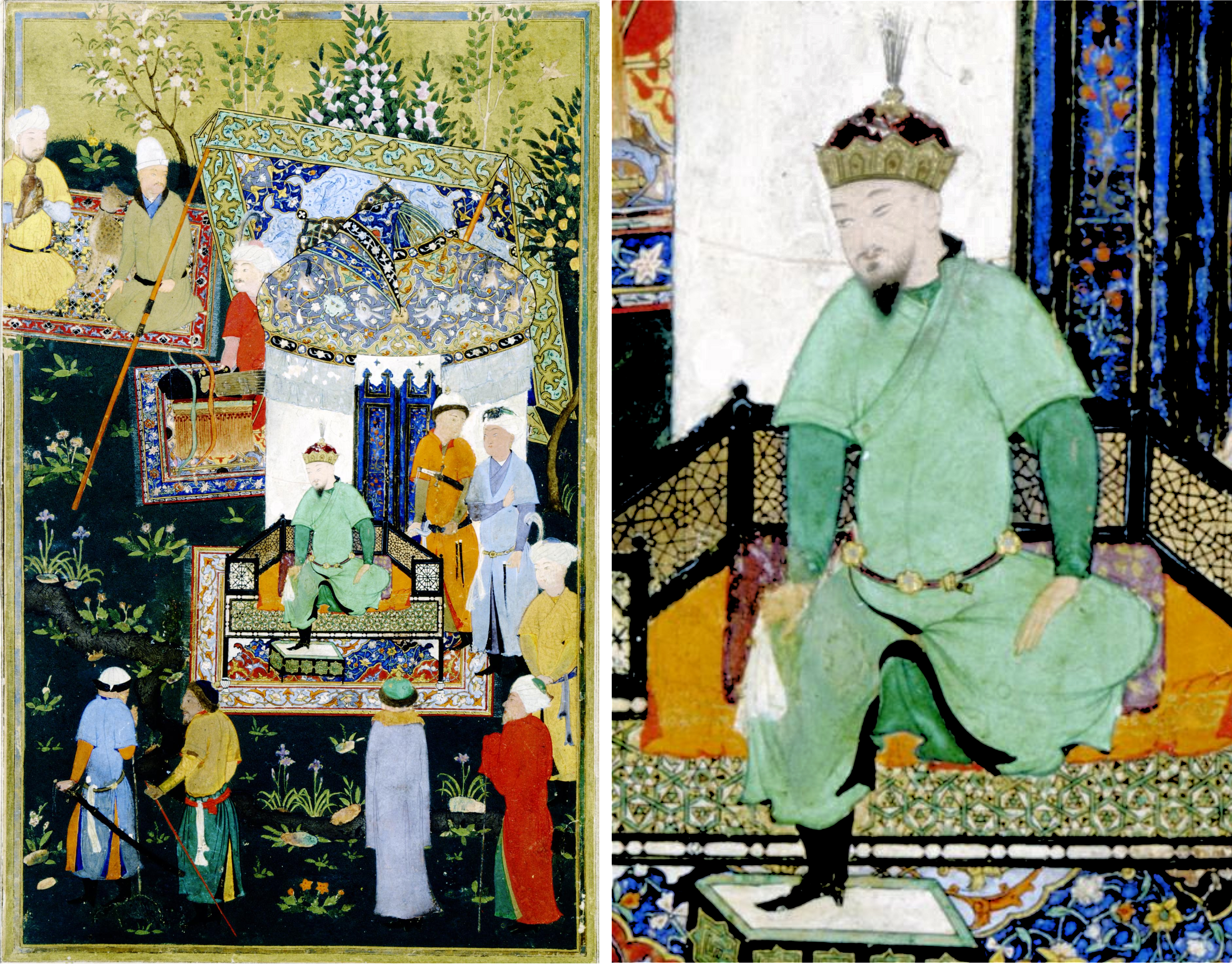
Depiction of Timur granting audience on the occasion of his accession in Balkh in 1370. Zafarnama (1467), commissioned by Sultan Husayn Bayqara

Timur's Turco-Mongolian heritage provided opportunities and challenges as he sought to rule the Mongol Empire and the Muslim world. According to the Mongol traditions, Timur could not claim the title of khan or rule the Mongol Empire because he was not a descendant of Genghis Khan. Therefore, Timur set up a puppet Chaghatayid Khan, Suyurghatmish, as the nominal ruler of Balkh as he pretended to act as a "protector of the member of a Chinggisid line, that of Genghis Khan's eldest son, Jochi". Timur instead used the title of Amir meaning general, and acting in the name of the Chagatai ruler of Transoxiana. To reinforce this position, Timur claimed the title güregen (royal son-in-law) to a princess of Chinggisid line.

As with the title of Khan, Timur similarly could not claim the supreme title of the Islamic world, Caliph, because the "office was limited to the Quraysh, the tribe of the Prophet Muhammad". Therefore, Timur reacted to the challenge by creating a myth and image of himself as a "supernatural personal power" ordained by God. Timur's most famous title was Sahib Qiran (صَاحِبِ قِرَان, 'Lord of Conjunction'), which is rooted in astrology a title that was used before him to designate Hamza ibn Abd al-Muttalib, the paternal uncle of Muhammad and which was taken by the Mamluk Sultan Baybars and by various rulers of the Ilkhanate to designate themselves. In that regard, he simply pursued an existing tradition in the Muslim world to designate conquerors.

The title was referring to the conjunction of the two "superior planets", Saturn and Jupiter, which was held to be an auspicious sign and the mark of a new era. According to A. Azfar Moin, Sahib Qiran was a messianic title, implying that Timur might potentially be the "awaited messiah descended from the prophetic line" who would "inaugurate a new era, possibly the last one before the end of time." Otherwise he depicted himself as a spiritual descendant of Ali, thus claiming the lineage of both Genghis Khan and the Quraysh.

== Period of expansion ==
Timur spent the next 35 years in various wars and expeditions. He not only consolidated his rule at home by the subjugation of his foes, but sought extension of territory by encroachments upon the lands of foreign potentates. His conquests to the west and northwest led him to the lands near the Caspian Sea and to the banks of the Ural and the Volga. Conquests in the south and southwest encompassed almost every province in Persia, including Baghdad, Karbala and Northern Iraq.

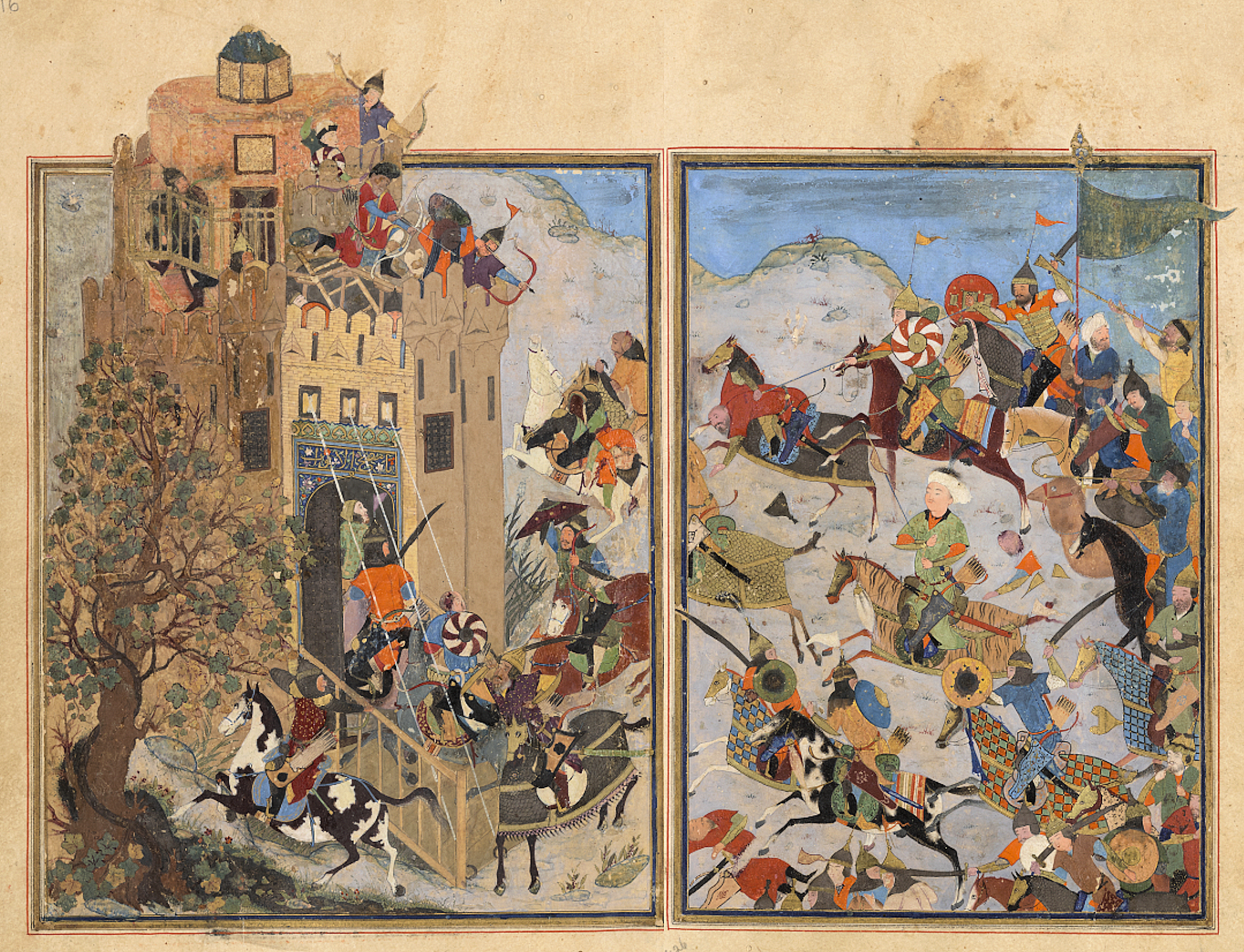
Timur's army, commanded by his son Umar Shaykh, in the Siege of Urgench (1379). Garrett Zafarnama (1480)

One of the most formidable of Timur's opponents was another Mongol ruler, a descendant of Genghis Khan named Tokhtamysh. After having been a refugee in Timur's court, Tokhtamysh became ruler both of the eastern Kipchak and the Golden Horde. After his accession, he quarreled with Timur over the possession of Khwarizm and Azerbaijan. However, Timur still supported him against the Russians, and in 1382, Tokhtamysh invaded the Muscovite dominion and burned Moscow.

Russian Orthodox tradition states that later, in 1395, having reached the frontier of the Principality of Ryazan, Timur had taken Yelets and started advancing towards Moscow. Vasily I of Moscow went with an army to Kolomna and halted at the banks of the Oka River. The clergy brought the famed Theotokos of Vladimir icon from Vladimir to Moscow. Timur stopped his advance and withdrew from Russian territory, with the Russian chroniclers claiming that a vision of the Virgin defending Moscow, accompanied by a heavenly host, convinced him to turn back.

== Conquest of Persia ==
After the death of Abu Sa'id, ruler of the Ilkhanate, in 1335, there was a power vacuum in Persia. In the end, Persia was split amongst the Muzaffarids, Kartids, Eretnids, Chobanids, Injuids, Jalayirids, and Sarbadars. In 1383, Timur started his lengthy military conquest of Persia, though he already ruled over much of Persian Khorasan by 1381, after Khwaja Mas'ud, of the Sarbadar dynasty surrendered. Timur began his Persian campaign with Herat, capital of the Kartid dynasty. When Herat did not surrender he reduced the city to rubble and massacred most of its citizens; it remained in ruins until Shah Rukh ordered its reconstruction around 1415. Timur then sent a general to capture rebellious Kandahar. With the capture of Herat the Kartid kingdom surrendered and became vassals of Timur; it would later be annexed outright less than a decade later in 1389 by Timur's son Miran Shah.

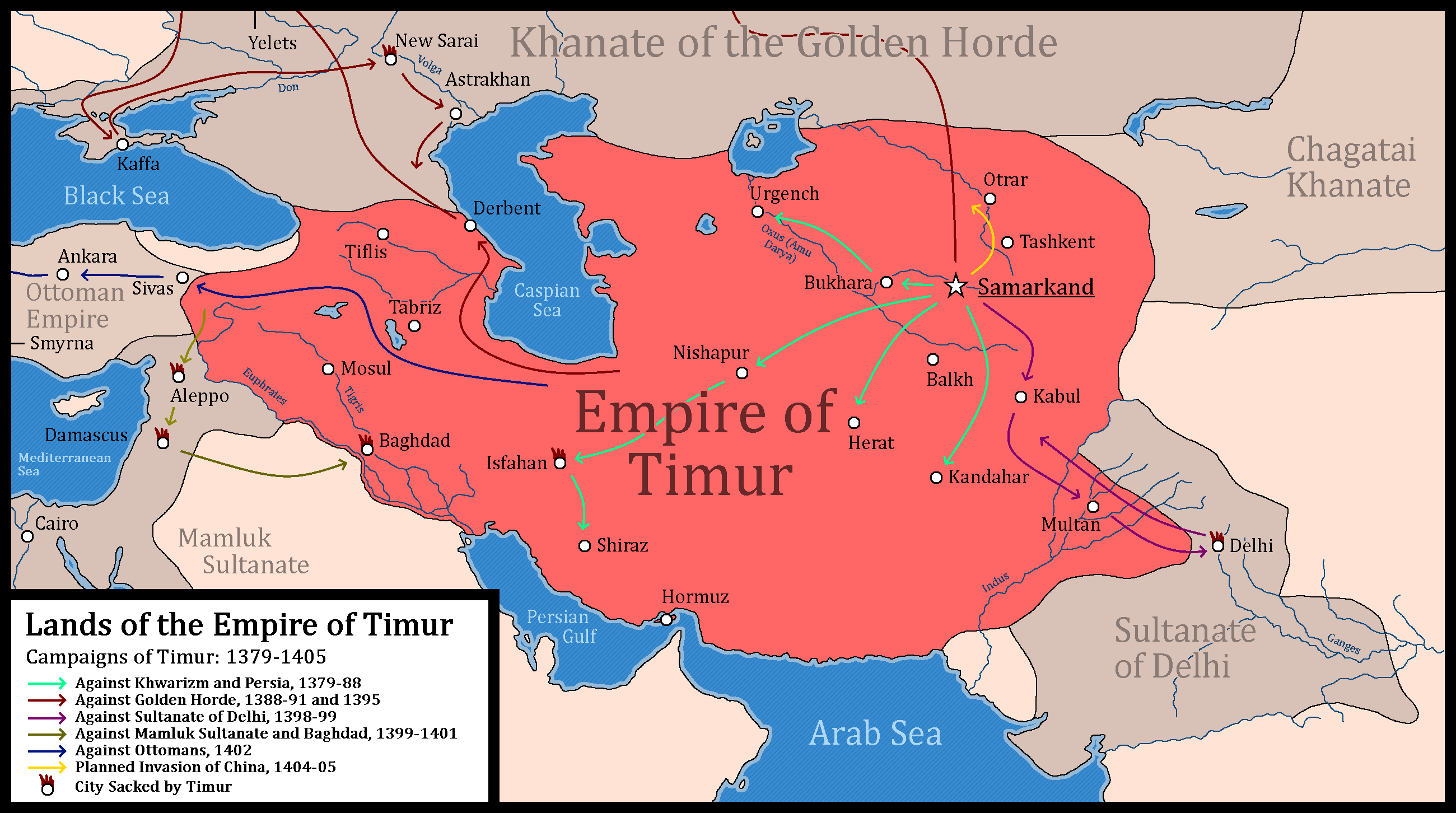
Timur's empire and his military campaigns

Timur then headed west to capture the Zagros Mountains, passing through Mazandaran. During his travel through the north of Persia, he captured the then town of Tehran, which surrendered and was thus treated mercifully. He laid siege to Soltaniyeh in 1384. Khorasan revolted one year later, so Timur destroyed Isfizar, and the prisoners were cemented into the walls alive. The next year the kingdom of Sistan, under the Mihrabanid dynasty, was ravaged, and its capital at Zaranj was destroyed. Timur then returned to his capital of Samarkand, where he began planning for his Georgian campaign and Golden Horde invasion. In 1386, Timur passed through Mazandaran as he had when trying to capture the Zagros. He went near the city of Soltaniyeh, which he had previously captured but instead turned north and captured Tabriz with little resistance, along with Maragha. He ordered heavy taxation of the people, which was collected by Adil Aqa, who was also given control over Soltaniyeh. Adil was later executed because Timur suspected him of corruption.

Timur then went north to begin his Georgian and Golden Horde campaigns, pausing his full-scale invasion of Persia. When he returned, he found his generals had done well in protecting the cities and lands he had conquered in Persia. Though many rebelled, and his son Miran Shah, who may have been regent, was forced to annex rebellious vassal dynasties, his holdings remained. So he proceeded to capture the rest of Persia, specifically the two major southern cities of Isfahan and Shiraz. When he arrived with his army at Isfahan in 1387, the city immediately surrendered; he treated it with relative mercy as he normally did with cities that surrendered (unlike Herat). However, after Isfahan revolted against Timur's taxes by killing the tax collectors and some of Timur's soldiers, he ordered the massacre of the city's citizens; the death toll is reckoned at between 100,000 and 200,000. An eye-witness counted more than 28 towers constructed of about 1,500 heads each. This has been described as a "systematic use of terror against towns...an integral element of Tamerlane's strategic element", which he viewed as preventing bloodshed by discouraging resistance. His massacres were selective and he spared the artistic and educated. This would later influence the next great Persian conqueror: Nader Shah.

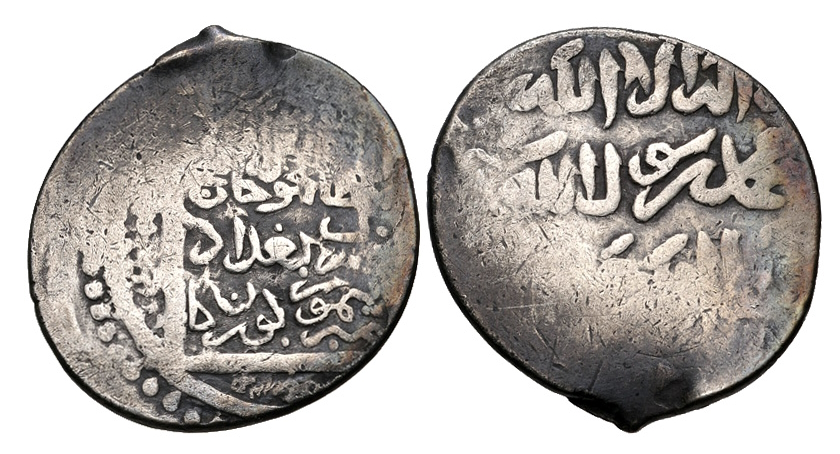
Rare coinage of Timur while in Jalayirid Baghdad, following the Siege of Baghdad (1393). Citing Chagatai khan Mahmud.

Timur then began a five-year campaign to the west in 1392, attacking Persian Kurdistan. In 1393, Shiraz was captured after surrendering, and the Muzaffarids became vassals of Timur, though prince Shah Mansur rebelled but was defeated at the Battle of Shiraz (1393), and the Muzaffarids were annexed. Shortly after Georgia was devastated so that the Golden Horde could not use it to threaten northern Iran. In the same year, Timur caught Baghdad by surprise in August by marching there in only eight days from Shiraz. Sultan Ahmad Jalayir fled to Syria, where the Mamluk Sultan Barquq protected him and killed Timur's envoys. Timur left the Sarbadar prince Khwaja Mas'ud to govern Baghdad, but he was driven out when Ahmad Jalayir returned. Ahmad was unpopular but got help from Qara Yusuf of the Kara Koyunlu; he fled again in 1399, this time to the Ottomans.

== Tokhtamysh–Timur war ==
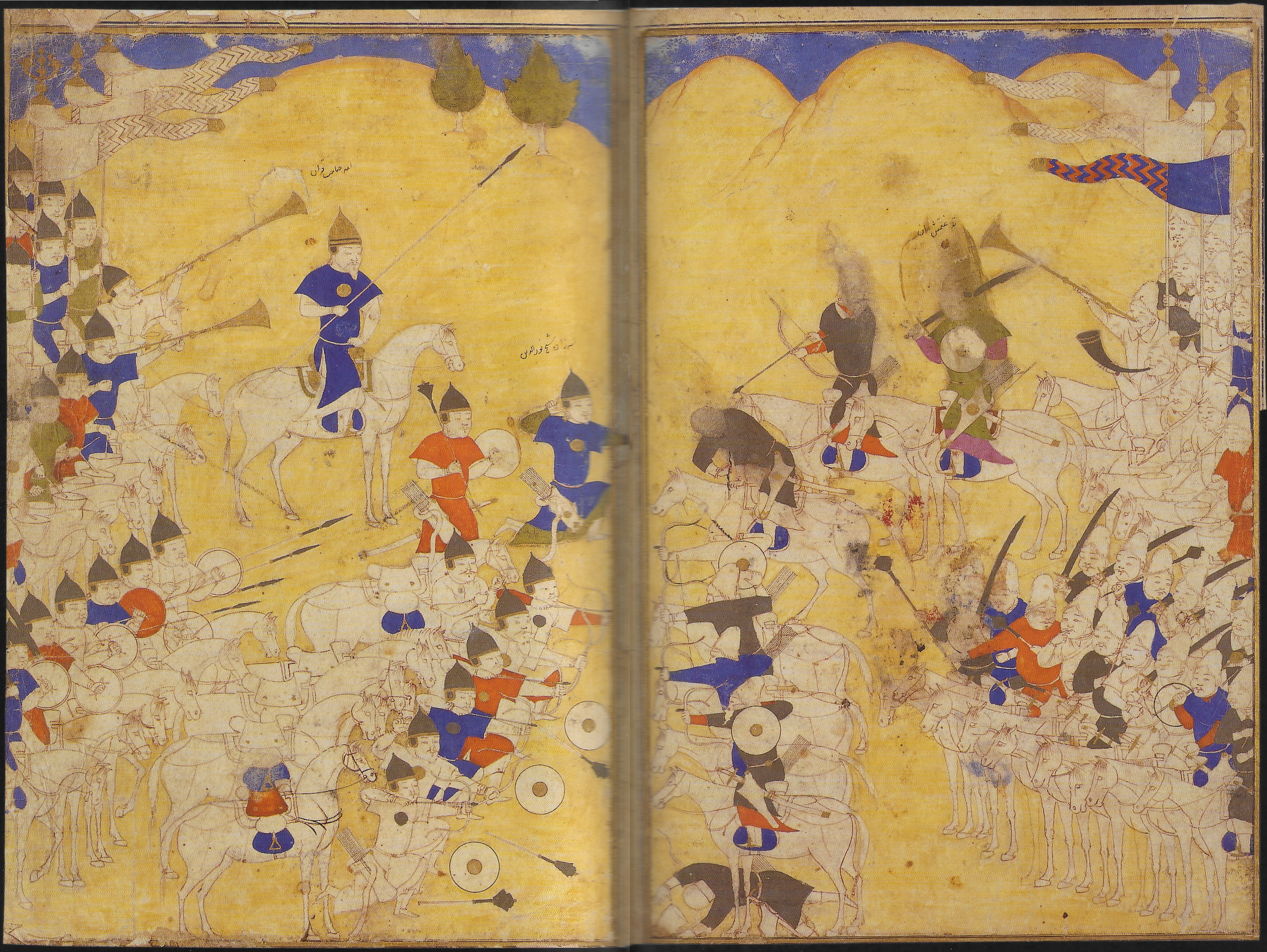
Battle between Timur (left) and Tokhtamysh (right), 1420–1440, possibly Herat. Topkapi H.2153.

In the meantime, Tokhtamysh, now khan of the Golden Horde, turned against his patron and in 1385 invaded Azerbaijan. The inevitable response by Timur resulted in the Tokhtamysh–Timur war. In the initial stage of the war, Timur won a victory at the Battle of the Kondurcha River. After the battle Tokhtamysh and some of his army were allowed to escape. After Tokhtamysh's initial defeat, Timur invaded Muscovy to the north of Tokhtamysh's holdings. Timur's army burned Ryazan and advanced on Moscow. He was pulled away before reaching the Oka River by Tokhtamysh's renewed campaign in the south.

In the first phase of the conflict with Tokhtamysh, Timur led an army of over 100,000 men north for more than 700 miles into the steppe. He then rode west about 1,000 miles advancing in a front more than 10 miles wide. During this advance, Timur's army got far enough north to be in a region of very long summer days causing complaints by his Muslim soldiers about keeping a long schedule of prayers. It was then that Tokhtamysh's army was boxed in against the east bank of the Volga River in the Orenburg region and destroyed at the Battle of the Kondurcha River, in 1391.

In the second phase of the conflict, Timur took a different route against the enemy by invading the realm of Tokhtamysh via the Caucasus region. In 1395, Timur defeated Tokhtamysh in the Battle of the Terek River, concluding the struggle between the two monarchs. Tokhtamysh was unable to restore his power or prestige, and he was killed about a decade later in the area of present-day Tyumen. During the course of Timur's campaigns, his army destroyed Sarai, the capital of the Golden Horde, and Astrakhan, subsequently disrupting the Golden Horde's Silk Road. The Golden Horde never recovered from its losses to Timur and ultimately disintegrated into a number of smaller khanates within the next half-century, which allowed Moscow to continue the "gathering of the Russian lands" and emerge as the dominant Russian state.

=== Ismailis ===
In May 1393, Timur's army invaded the Anjudan, crippling the Ismaili village only a year after his assault on the Ismailis in Mazandaran. The village was prepared for the attack, evidenced by its fortress and system of tunnels. Undeterred, Timur's soldiers flooded the tunnels by cutting into a channel overhead. Timur's reasons for attacking this village are not yet well understood. However, it has been suggested that his religious persuasions and view of himself as an executor of divine will may have contributed to his motivations. The Persian historian Khwandamir explains that an Ismaili presence was growing more politically powerful in Persian Iraq. A group of locals in the region was dissatisfied with this and, Khwandamir writes, these locals assembled and brought up their complaint with Timur, possibly provoking his attack on the Ismailis there.

== Campaign against the Delhi Sultanate ==
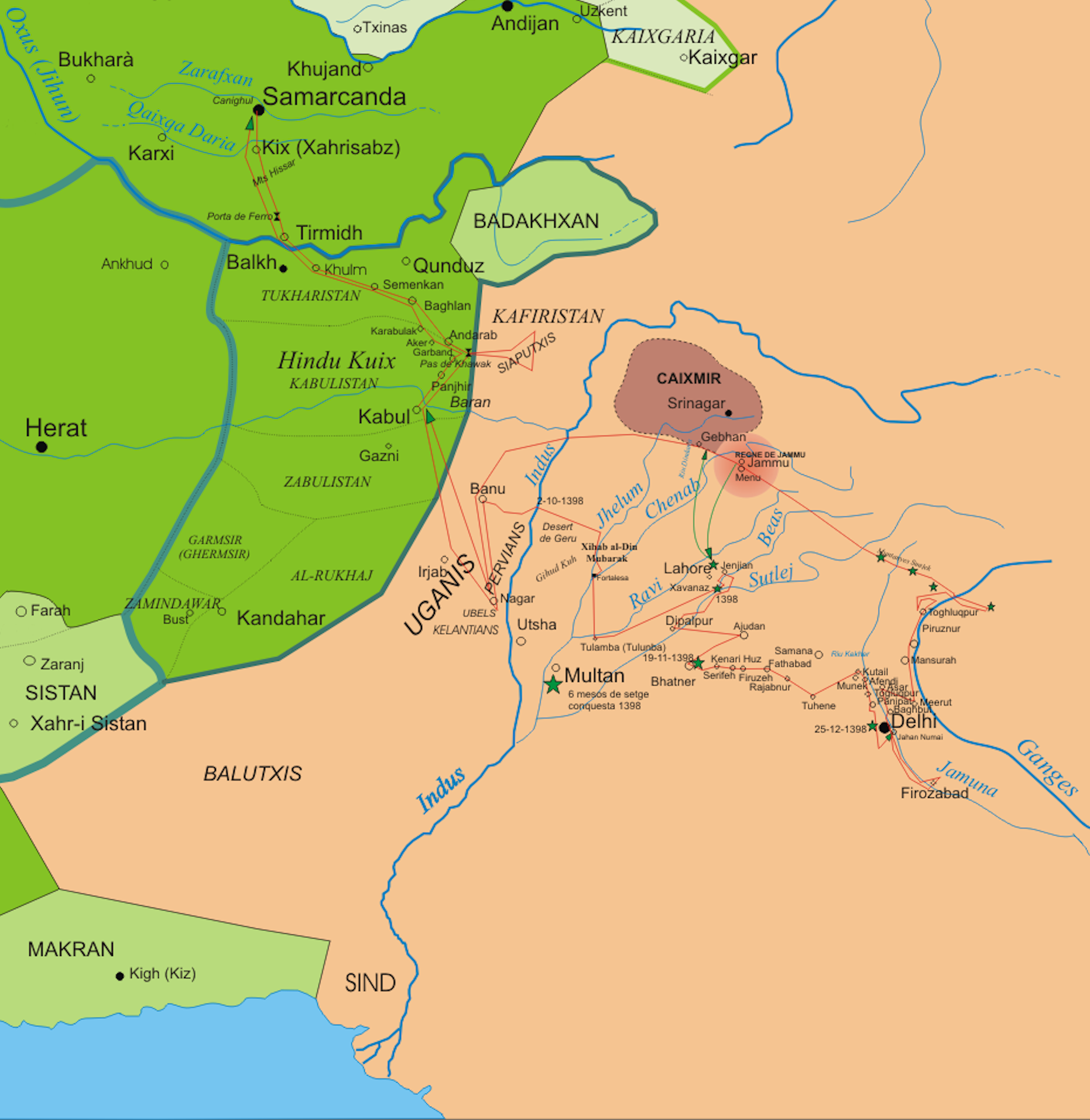
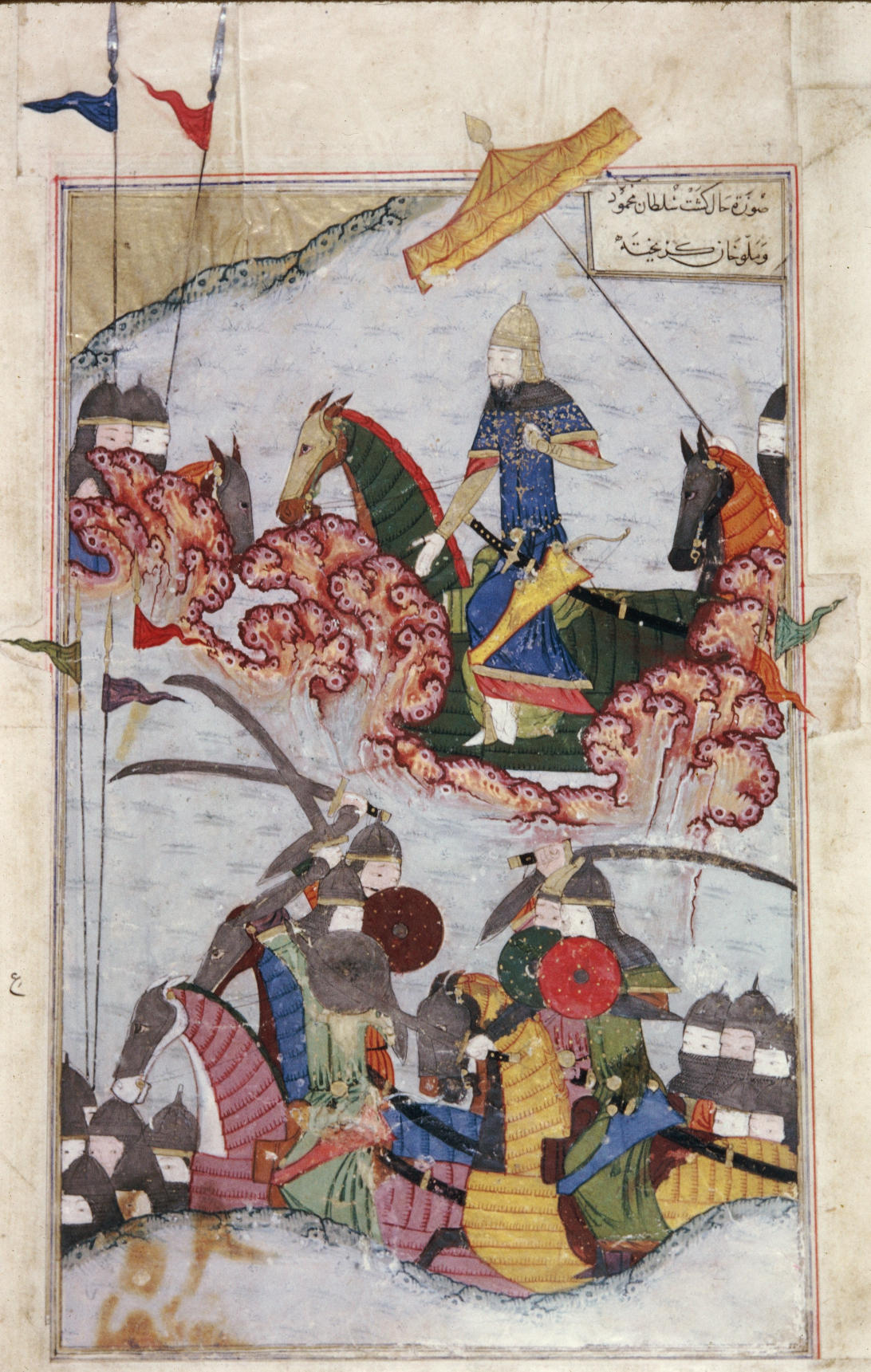
Map of Timur's invasion of India in 1398-99, and painting of Timur defeating the Sultan of Delhi, Nasir Al-Din Mahmud Tughluq, in the winter of 1397–1398 (painting dated 1436).

In the late 14th century, the Tughlaq dynasty, which had ruled the Delhi Sultanate since 1320, had declined. Most provincial governors had asserted their independence, and the Sultanate was reduced to a fraction of its former extent. This anarchy drew the attention of Timur, who in 1398 invaded the Indian subcontinent during the reign of Sultan Mahmud Shah II. After crossing the Indus River on 30 September 1398 with a force of 90,000, he sacked Tulamba and massacred its inhabitants. He sent an advance guard under his grandson Pir Muhammad, who captured Multan after a siege of six months. His invasion was unopposed as most of the nobility surrendered without a fight. He encountered resistance from a force of 2000 under Malik Jasrat at the Sutlej between Tulamba and Dipalpur. Jasrat was defeated and taken into captivity. Next he captured the fort of Bhatner which was being defended by Rajput chief Rai Dul Chand and demolished it.

While on his march towards Delhi, Timur was opposed by the Jat peasantry, who would loot caravans and then disappear in the forests. He had thousands of Jats killed and many taken captive. But the Sultanate at Delhi did nothing to stop his advance.

=== Capture of Delhi (1398) ===
The battle took place on 17 December 1398. Before the battle, Timur slaughtered some 100,000 slaves who had been captured previously in the Indian campaign. This was done out of fear that they might revolt.

Sultan Nasir-ud-Din Mahmud Shah Tughluq and the army of Mallu Iqbal had war elephants armored with chain mail and poison on their tusks. As his Tatar forces were afraid of the elephants, Timur ordered his men to dig a trench in front of their positions. Timur then loaded his camels with as much wood and hay as they could carry. When the war elephants charged, Timur set the hay on fire and prodded the camels with iron sticks, causing them to charge at the elephants, howling in pain: Timur had understood that elephants were easily panicked. Faced with the strange spectacle of camels flying straight at them with flames leaping from their backs, the elephants turned around and stampeded back toward their own lines. Timur capitalized on the subsequent disruption in the forces of Nasir-ud-Din Mahmud Shah Tughluq, securing an easy victory. Nasir-ud-Din Mahmud Shah Tughluq fled with remnants of his forces.

The capture of the Delhi Sultanate was one of Timur's largest and most devastating victories as at that time, Delhi was one of the richest cities in the world. The city of Delhi was sacked and reduced to ruins, with the population enslaved. After the fall of the city, uprisings by its citizens against the Turkic-Mongols began to occur, causing a retaliatory bloody massacre within the city walls. After three days of citizens uprising within Delhi, it was said that the city reeked of the decomposing bodies of its citizens with their heads being erected like structures and the bodies left as food for the birds by Timur's soldiers. Timur's invasion and destruction of Delhi continued the chaos that was still consuming India, and the city would not be able to recover from the great loss it suffered for almost a century.

== Campaigns in the Caucasus and the Levant ==
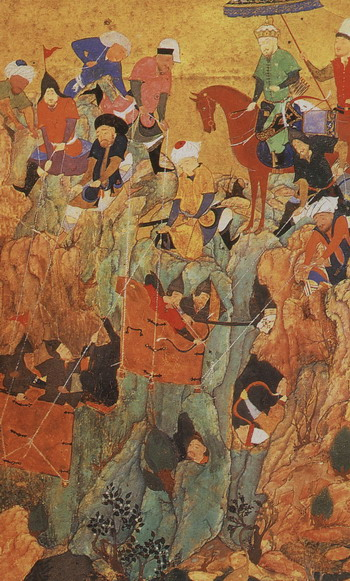
Emir Timur's army attacks the survivors of the town of Nerges, in Georgia, in the spring of 1396. Garrett Zafarnama (c. 1480)

Before the end of 1399, Timur started a war with Bayezid I, sultan of the Ottoman Empire, and the Mamluk sultan of Egypt Nasir-ad-Din Faraj. Bayezid began annexing the territory of Turkmen and Muslim rulers in Anatolia. As Timur claimed sovereignty over the Turkoman rulers, they took refuge behind him.

In 1400, Timur invaded Armenia and Georgia. Between 1386 and 1404, the Turco-Mongol forces of Timur raided the countries of Transcaucasia from their bases in northern Iran several times. Tiflis was finally conquered by Timur in 1404, and King George VII was forced to recognize Timurid suzerainty. Armenia too, which had been under Mongol Jalayirid control, was incorporated into the Timurid realm. Of the surviving population, more than 60,000 of the local people were captured as slaves, and many districts were depopulated. He also sacked Sivas in Asia Minor.

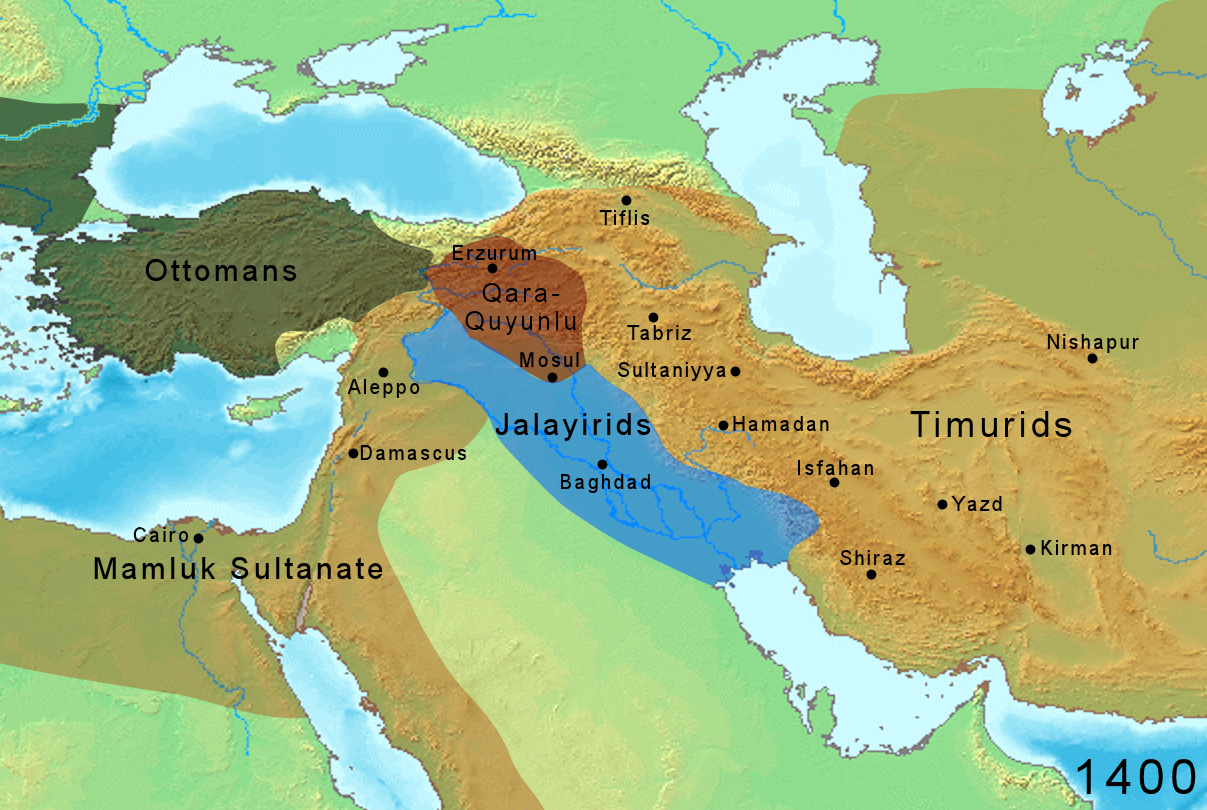
Jalayirid and Timurid territories in 1400.

Then Timur turned his attention to Syria, sacking Aleppo, and Damascus. The city's inhabitants were massacred, except for the artisans, who were deported to Samarkand.

Timur invaded Baghdad in June 1401. After the capture of the city, 20,000 of its citizens were massacred. Timur ordered that every soldier should return with at least two severed human heads to show him. When they ran out of men to kill, many warriors killed prisoners captured earlier in the campaign, and when they ran out of prisoners to kill, many resorted to beheading their own wives. British historian David Nicolle, in his "The Mongol Warlords", quotes an anonymous contemporary historian who compared Timur's army to "ants and locusts covering the whole countryside, plundering and ravaging."

== Invasion of Anatolia ==
In the meantime, years of insulting letters had passed between Timur and Bayezid. Both rulers insulted each other in their own way while Timur preferred to undermine Bayezid's position as a ruler and play down the significance of his military successes.

This is the excerpt from one of Timur's letters addressed to the Ottoman sultan:

Believe me, you are but pismire ant: don't seek to fight the elephants for they'll crush you under their feet. Shall a petty prince such as you contend with us? But your rodomontades (braggadocio) are not extraordinary; for a Turcoman never spake with judgement. If you don't follow our counsels you will regret it

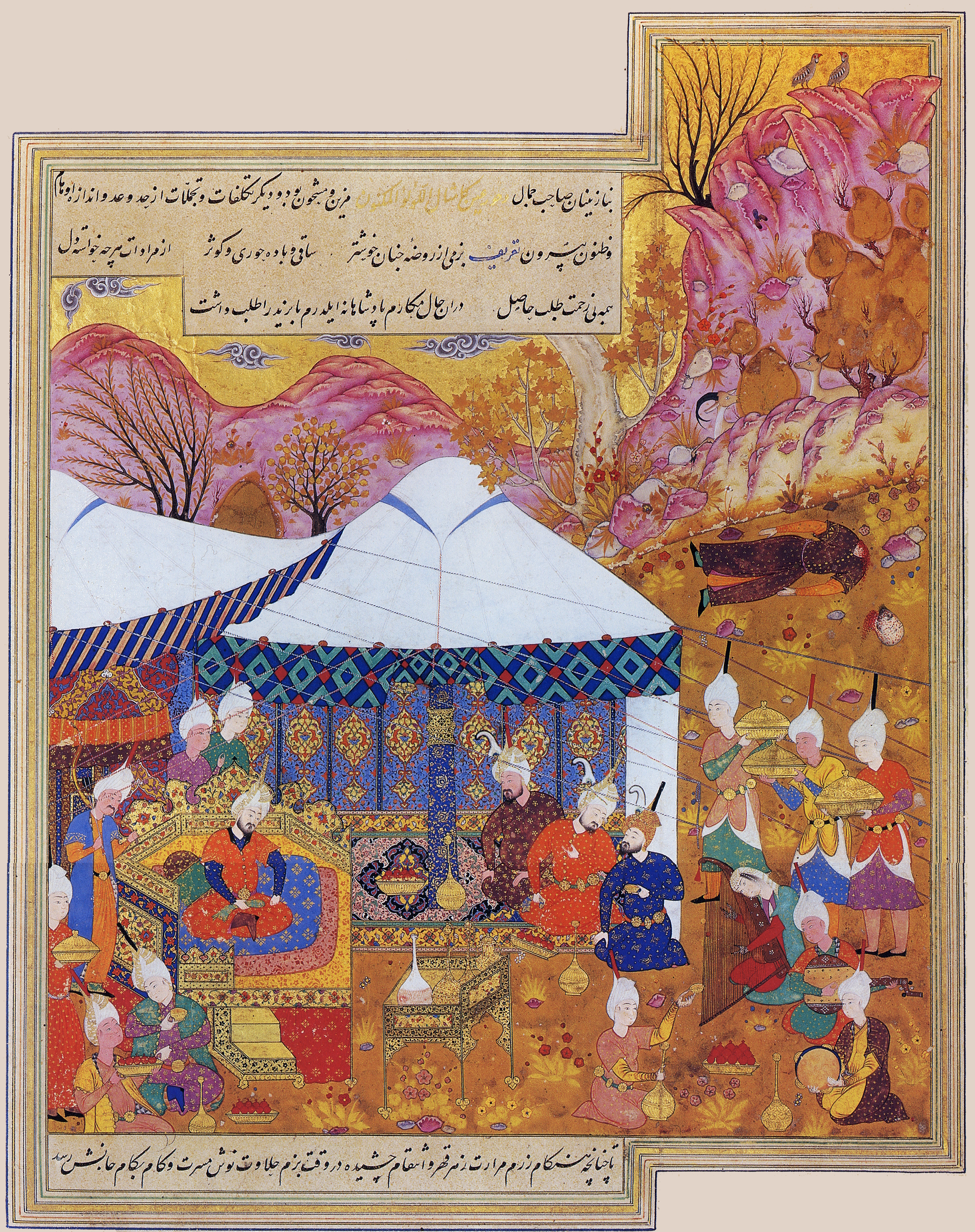
Festivities with Bayezid I as prisoner, after conquering Anatolia. Zafarnama, 1528 (Golestan, MS 708).

Finally, Timur invaded Anatolia and defeated Bayezid in the Battle of Ankara on 20 July 1402. Bayezid was captured in battle and subsequently died in captivity, initiating the twelve-year Ottoman Interregnum period. Timur's stated motivation for attacking Bayezid and the Ottoman Empire was the restoration of Seljuq authority. Timur saw the Seljuks as the rightful rulers of Anatolia as they had been granted rule by Mongol conquerors, illustrating Timur's interest with Genghizid legitimacy.

In December 1402, Timur besieged and conquered Smyrna, a stronghold of the Christian Knights Hospitalers; thus he referred to himself as ghazi or "Warrior of Islam". A mass beheading was carried out in Smyrna by Timur's soldiers.

With the Treaty of Gallipoli in February 1403, Timur was furious with the Genoese and Venetians, since their ships ferried the Ottoman army to safety in Thrace. As Lord Kinross reported in The Ottoman Centuries, the Italians preferred the enemy they could handle to the one they could not.

During the early interregnum, Bayezid I's son Mehmed Çelebi acted as Timur's vassal. Unlike other princes, Mehmed minted coins that had Timur's name stamped as "Demur han Gürgân" (تيمور خان كركان), alongside his own as "Mehmed bin Bayezid han" (محمد بن بايزيد خان). This was probably an attempt on Mehmed's part to justify to Timur his conquest of Bursa after the Battle of Ulubad. After Mehmed established himself in Rum, Timur had already begun preparations for his return to Central Asia, and took no further steps to interfere with the status quo in Anatolia.

While Timur was still in Anatolia, Qara Yusuf assaulted Baghdad and captured it in 1402. Timur returned to Persia and sent his grandson, Abu Bakr ibn Miran Shah, to reconquer Baghdad, which he did. Timur then spent some time in Ardabil, where he gave Ali Safavi, leader of the Safaviyya, several captives. Subsequently, he marched to Khorasan and then to Samarkand, where he spent nine months celebrating and preparing to invade Mongolia and China.

== Attempts to attack the Ming dynasty ==
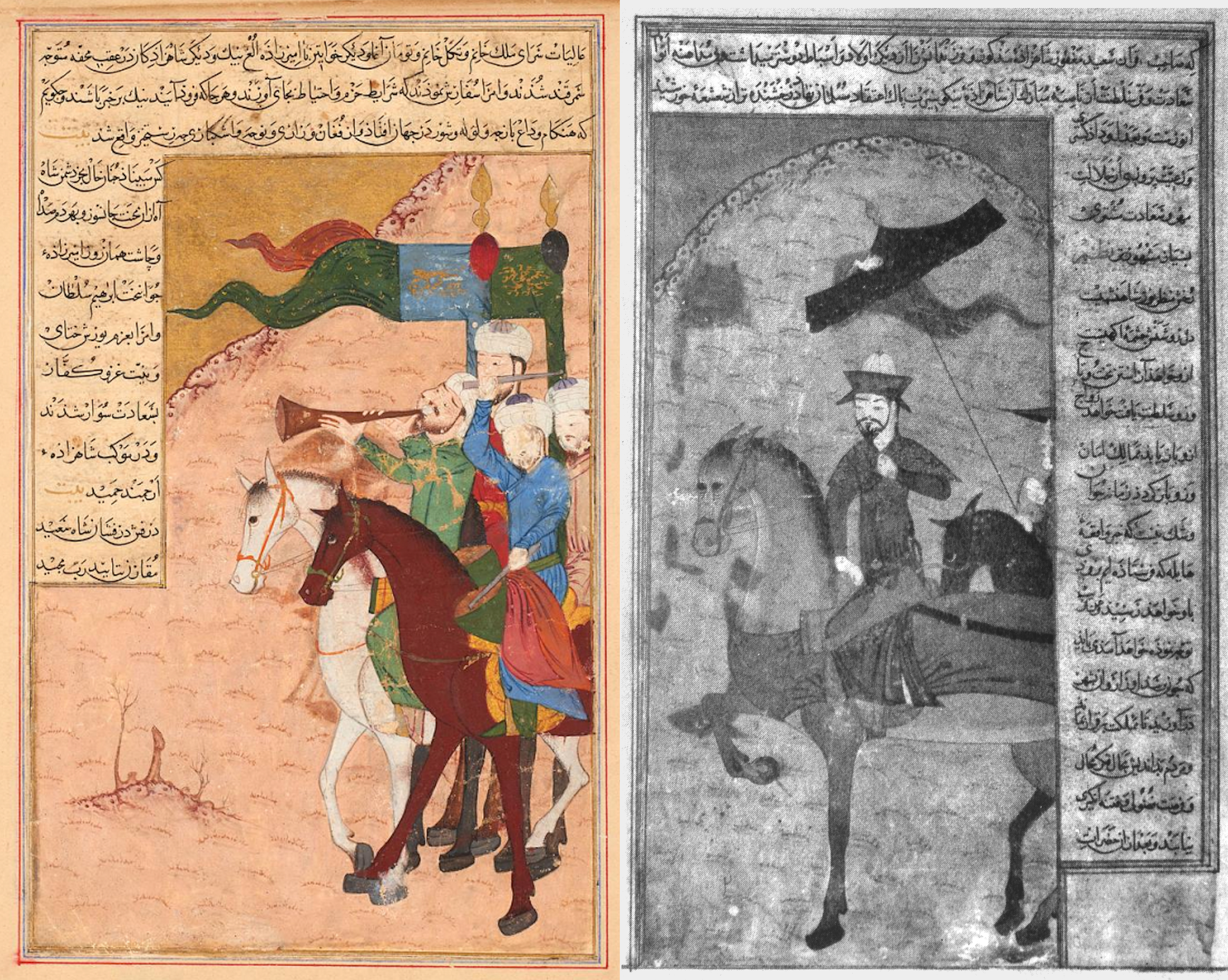
The campaign against China. Shah Rukh (right) leads the Timurid army towards China on 19 February 1405, after Timur's death. Zafarnama (1436)

In 1368, the Yuan dynasty collapsed and was succeeded by the Ming dynasty. The Ming dynasty during the reigns of its founder, the Hongwu Emperor, and his son, the Yongle Emperor, produced tributary states of many Central Asian countries. In 1394, the Hongwu Emperor's ambassadors eventually presented Timur with a letter addressing him as a subject. Timur had the ambassadors Fu An, Guo Ji, and Liu Wei detained. Neither the Hongwu Emperor's next ambassador, Chen Dewen (1397), nor the delegation announcing the accession of the Yongle Emperor fared any better.

Timur eventually planned to invade China. To this end, Timur made an alliance with surviving Mongol tribes in the Mongolian Plateau and prepared all the way to Bukhara. Engke Khan sent his grandson Öljei Temür Khan, also known as "Buyanshir Khan" after he converted to Islam while at the court of Timur in Samarkand.

== Death ==
Timur preferred to fight his battles in the spring. However, he moved east via Timur's Gates and died en route during an uncharacteristic winter campaign. In December 1404, Timur began military campaigns against Ming China and detained a Ming envoy. He became ill while encamped on the farther side of the Syr Daria and died at Farab on 17 or 18 February 1405, before ever reaching the Chinese border. After his death, the Ming envoys such as Fu An and the remaining entourage were released by his grandson Khalil Sultan.

Geographer Clements Markham, in his introduction to the narrative of Clavijo's embassy, states that, after Timur died, his body "was embalmed with musk and rose water, wrapped in linen, laid in an ebony coffin and sent to Samarkand, where it was buried". His tomb, the Gur-e-Amir, still stands in Samarkand, though it has been heavily restored in recent years.

== Succession ==
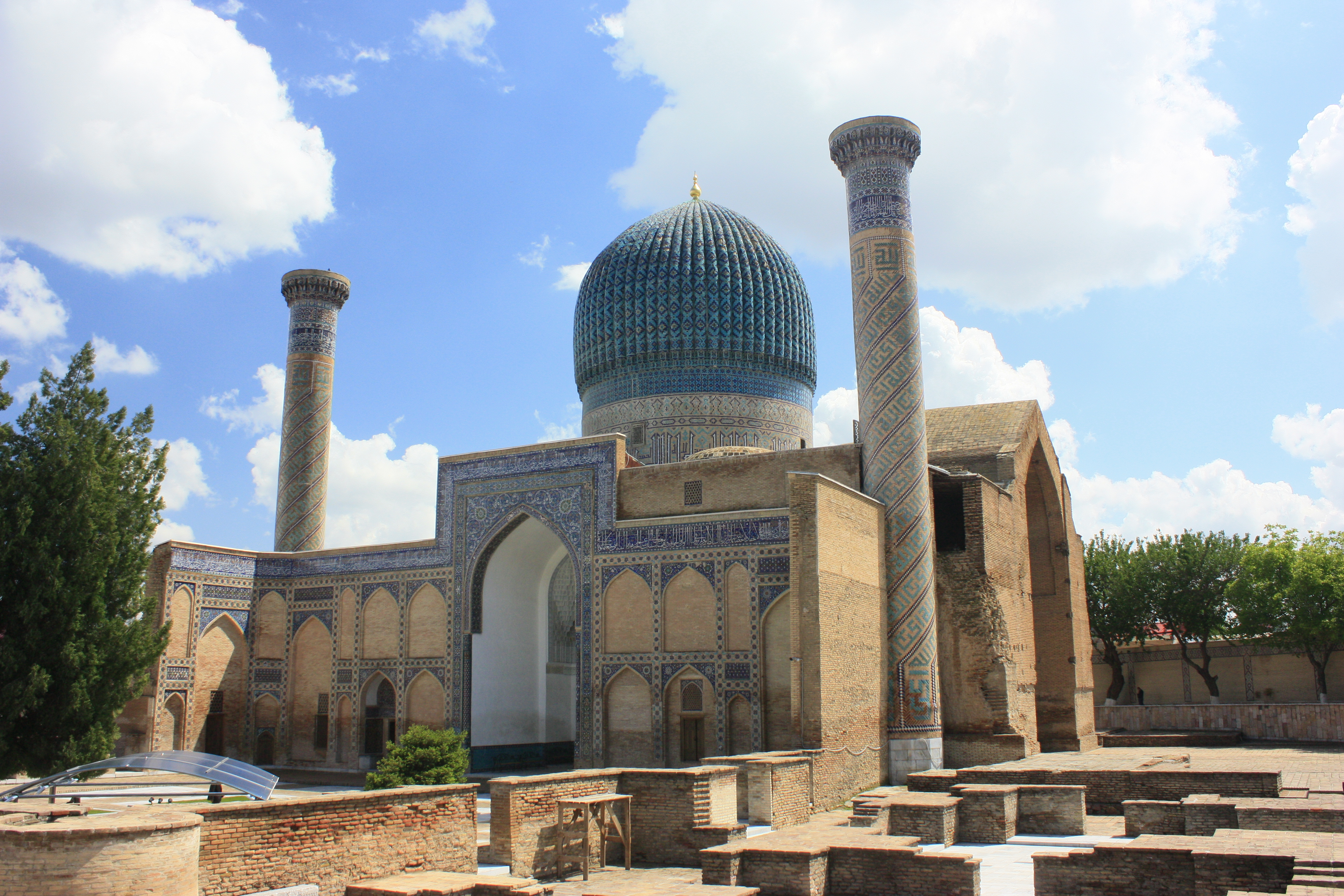
Timur's mausoleum is located in Samarkand, Uzbekistan.

Timur had twice previously appointed an heir apparent to succeed him, both of whom he had outlived. The first, his son Jahangir, died of illness in 1376. The second, his grandson Muhammad Sultan, had died from battle wounds in 1403. After the latter's death, Timur did nothing to replace him. It was only when he was on his own death-bed that he appointed Muhammad Sultan's younger brother, Pir Muhammad as his successor.

Pir Muhammad was unable to gain sufficient support from his relatives and a bitter civil war erupted amongst Timur's descendants, with multiple princes pursuing their claims. It was not until 1409 that Timur's youngest son, Shah Rukh was able to overcome his rivals and take the throne as Timur's successor.

== Religious views ==
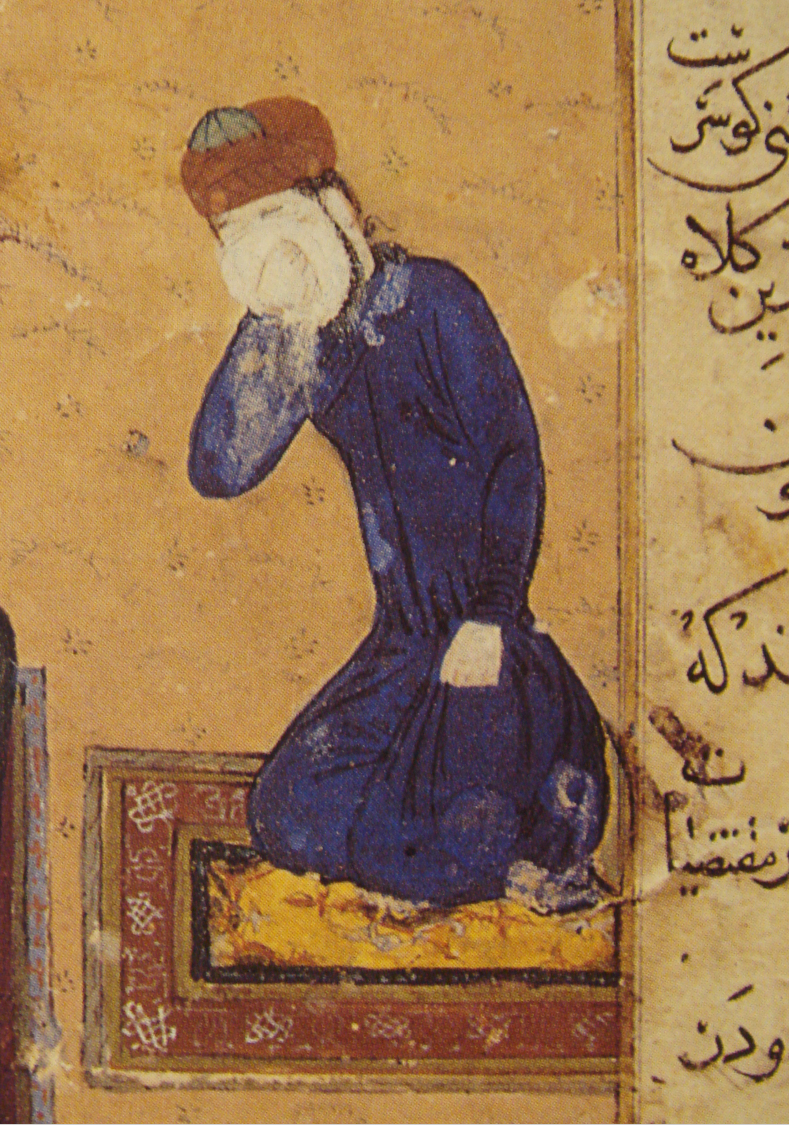
Timur at the funerals of his grandson Muhammad Sultan Mirza ibn Jahangir in 1403. Zafarnama (1436)

Timur was a practising Sunni Muslim, possibly belonging to the Naqshbandi Order of Sufism, which was influential in Transoxiana. His chief official religious counsellor and adviser was the Hanafi scholar Abd al-Jabbar Khwarezmi. In Termez, he had come under the influence of the spiritual mentor Sayyid Baraka, a leader from Balkh who is buried alongside Timur in Gur-e-Amir.

Timur was known to hold Ali and the Ahl al-Bayt in high regard and has been noted by various scholars for his "pro-Shia" stance. However, he also punished Shias for desecrating the memories of the Companions of the Prophet. Timur was also noted for attacking the Shia with Sunni apologism, while at other times he attacked Sunnis on religious grounds as well. In contrast, Timur held the Seljuk Sultan Ahmad Sanjar in high regard for attacking the Ismailis at Alamut, and Timur's own attack on Ismailis at Anjudan was equally brutal.

Kazakh archaeologists studied a ritual burial mound in Ulytau, constructed by Timur during his campaign against the Golden Horde, with the assistance of specialists in chemistry and geology. They concluded that the site had a sacred significance for Timur. The mound was erected with the purpose of appealing to the spirits of his ancestors and seeking their support in the war against Tokhtamysh. This interpretation associates the practices attributed to Timur with beliefs rooted in the religious traditions of the Mongols of the 13th century and shamanism, raising questions about the extent to which he observed the norms of Islamic law (Sharia). Timur's contemporaries also questioned his adherence to Islam and did not recognize Timur as a Muslim. According to Ibn Arabshah: "He gave preference to the laws of Genghis Khan, considering them fundamental. Therefore, a large number of theologians issued a fatwa declaring him an unbeliever, although Islamic rites were openly practiced in his realm".

Timur waged wars against other states with the aim of conquest and plunder. His main opponents were Muslim countries. The rulers and Islamic theologians of these countries undoubtedly held this against Timur, accusing him of unbelief or portraying him as a tyrant who was worse than the infidels. The Russian chronicles include the Tale of Temir-Aksak, in which Timur is characterized as an evil pagan. This information may have originated from the nomads of the Golden Horde. The question of Timur's religiosity was also addressed in his correspondence with the Ottoman ruler Bayezid I. The Ottomans wrote of Timur and his army that they were "worse than the infidels". In his work On the Burial of Timur, Vasily Bartold, drawing on the writings of Sharaf al-Din Yazdi, describes how, after Timur's burial, his wives and other noble women performed mourning rituals according to nomadic customs: they uncovered their heads and scratched their faces, blackened their faces, tore their hair, threw themselves to the ground and covered their heads with dust, and wrapped felt around their necks. During the "nomadic custom" following Timur's death, "even representatives of Islam, such as the shaykh al-Islam Abd al-Awwal and Isam al-Din, were compelled to wear mourning garments." It is likely that Timur's image was heavily Islamized by his descendants, above all by Shah Rukh.

== Personality ==
Timur is regarded as a military genius and as a brilliant tactician with an uncanny ability to work within a highly fluid political structure to win and maintain a loyal following of nomads during his rule in Central Asia. He was also considered extraordinarily intelligent – not only intuitively but also intellectually. In Samarkand and his many travels, Timur, under the guidance of distinguished scholars, was able to learn Persian, Mongolian, and Turkic languages (according to ibn Arabshah, Timur could not speak Arabic). However, Timur held Persian in distinction, as it was the language not only of his court, but also that of his chancellery.

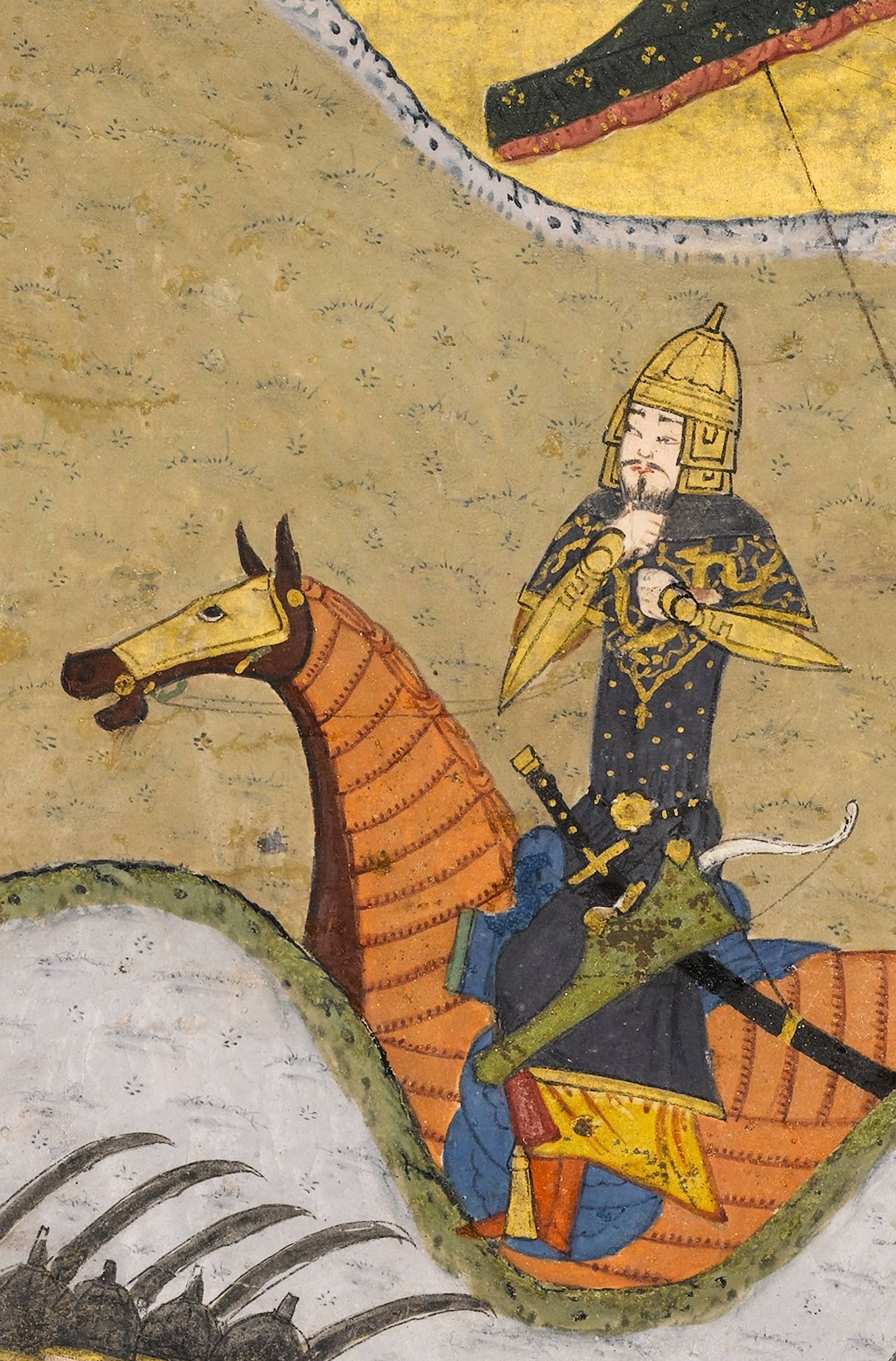
Timur leading his troops at the 1401 Siege of Baghdad. Near-contemporary portrait in Zafarnama, commissioned by his grandson Ibrahim Sultan in 1424–28. Published in 1435–36.

According to John Joseph Saunders, Timur was "the product of an Islamized and Iranized society" rather than a steppe nomad. More importantly, Timur was characterized as an opportunist. Taking advantage of his Turco-Mongolian heritage, Timur frequently used either Islam or the sharia, fiqh, and traditions of the Mongol Empire to achieve his military goals or domestic political aims. Timur was a learned king, and enjoyed the company of scholars; he was tolerant and generous to them. He was a contemporary of the Persian poet Hafez, and a story of their meeting explains that Timur summoned Hafez, who had written a ghazal with the following verse:

For the black mole on thy cheek
I would give the cities of Samarkand and Bukhara.

Timur upbraided him for this verse and said, "By the blows of my well tempered sword I have conquered the greater part of the world to enlarge Samarkand and Bukhara, my capitals and residences; and you, pitiful creature, would exchange these two cities for a mole." Hafez, undaunted, replied, "It is by similar generosity that I have been reduced, as you see, to my present state of poverty." It is reported that he was pleased by the witty answer, and the poet departed with magnificent gifts.

There is a widely held view that Timur's real motive for his campaigns was imperial ambition, as expressed in his statement: "The whole expanse of the inhabited part of the world is not large enough to have two kings." However, while Timur employed a centralized administrative structure in his core territories of Central Asia and Iran which combined Turko-Mongol nomadic traditions with a Persian bureaucratic apparatus, beyond Iran, Timur plundered the states he invaded to enrich his native Samarqand and neglected the conquered areas, which may have contributed to the fragmentation of the empire after his death.

Timur used Persian expressions in his conversations often, and his motto was the Persian phrase rāstī rustī (راستی رستی, meaning "truth is safety" or "veritas salus"). He is credited with the invention of the Tamerlane chess variant, played on a 10×11 board.

== Exchanges with Europe ==
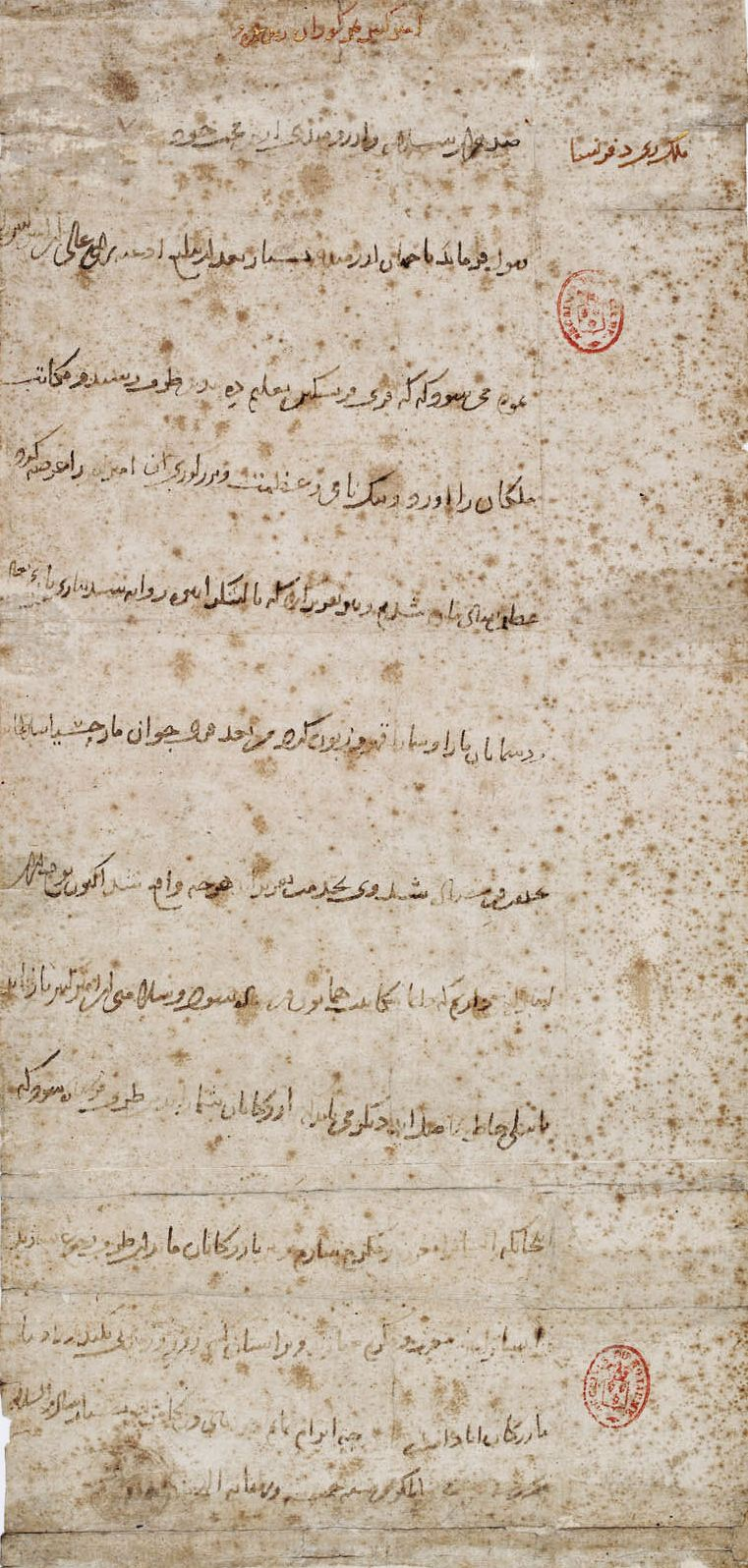
Letter of Timur to Charles VI of France, 1402, a witness to Timurid relations with Europe. Archives Nationales, Paris.

Timur had numerous epistolary and diplomatic exchanges with various European states, especially Spain and France. Relations between the court of Henry III of Castile and that of Timur played an important part in medieval Castilian diplomacy. In 1402, the time of the Battle of Ankara, two Spanish ambassadors were already with Timur: Pelayo de Sotomayor and Fernando de Palazuelos. Later, Timur sent to the court of the Kingdom of León and Castile a Chagatai ambassador named Hajji Muhammad al-Qazi with letters and gifts.

In return, Henry III of Castile sent a famous embassy to Timur's court in Samarkand in 1403–06, led by Ruy González de Clavijo, with two other ambassadors, Alfonso Paez and Gomez de Salazar. On their return, Timur affirmed that he regarded the king of Castile "as his very own son".

According to Clavijo, Timur's good treatment of the Spanish delegation contrasted with the disdain shown by his host toward the envoys of the "lord of Cathay" (i.e., the Yongle Emperor), the Chinese ruler. Clavijo's visit to Samarkand allowed him to report to the European audience on the news from Cathay (China), which few Europeans had been able to visit directly in the century that had passed since the travels of Marco Polo.

The French archives preserve:

- A 30 July 1402 letter from Timur to Charles VI of France, suggesting that he send traders to Asia. It is written in Persian.
- A May 1403 letter. This is a Latin transcription of a letter from Timur to Charles VI, and another from Miran Shah, his son, to the Christian princes, announcing their victory over Bayezid I at Smyrna.

A copy has been kept of the answer of Charles VI to Timur, dated 15 June 1403.

In addition, Byzantine John VII Palaiologos who was a regent during his uncle's absence in the West, sent a Dominican friar in August 1401 to Timur, to pay his respect and propose paying tribute to him instead of the Turks, once he managed to defeat them.

== Legacy ==
Timur's legacy is a mixed one. While Central Asia blossomed under his reign, other places, such as Baghdad, Damascus, Delhi and other Arab, Georgian, Persian, and Indian cities were sacked and destroyed and their populations massacred. Thus, while Timur still retains a positive image in Muslim Central Asia, he is vilified by many in Arabia, Iraq, Persia, and India, where some of his greatest atrocities were carried out. However, Ibn Khaldun praises Timur for having unified much of the Muslim world when other conquerors of the time could not.

Timur is considered the last of the great nomadic conquerors of Central Asia to achieve such significant military successes. He distinguished himself as an outstanding leader of nomadic warriors and a ruler who united agricultural and pastoral peoples under his authority within a vast empire. According to Beatrice Forbes Manz, Timur's career represented the last manifestation of the military power of the nomads.

The next great conqueror of the Middle East, Nader Shah, was greatly influenced by Timur and almost re-enacted Timur's conquests and battle strategies in his own campaigns. Like Timur, Nader Shah conquered most of Caucasia, Persia, and Central Asia along with also sacking Delhi.

Timur's short-lived empire also melded the Turko-Persian tradition in Transoxiana, and, in most of the territories that he incorporated into his fiefdom, Persian became the primary language of administration and literary culture (diwan), regardless of ethnicity. In addition, during his reign, some contributions to Turkic literature were penned, with Turkic cultural influence expanding and flourishing as a result. A literary form of Chagatai Turkic came into use alongside Persian as both a cultural and an official language.

In Uzbekistan, Timur is referred to as the "Founder of the Uzbek nation" despite having belonged to a competing tribe that hated the Uzbeks. His monument in Tashkent now occupies the place where Karl Marx's statue once stood. The Amir Timur Museum in Tashkent focuses on his genealogy and life.

A Tatar theologian and historian, Şihabetdin Märcani, argued that the weakening of Kazan and Bolghar, as well as their subsequent disappearance and fragmentation, was caused by Timur's invasions and looting. In support of his view, he cited the words of his teacher: "We have repeatedly heard the qadi Abu Sa'id al-Samarqandi, may Allah have mercy upon him, say that Timur inflicted many times more harm upon Islam than the infidels Genghis Khan, Chagatai, and Hulagu".

Tamerlane virtually exterminated the Church of the East, which had previously been a major branch of Christianity but afterwards became largely confined to a small area now known as the Assyrian Triangle.

=== Historical sources ===
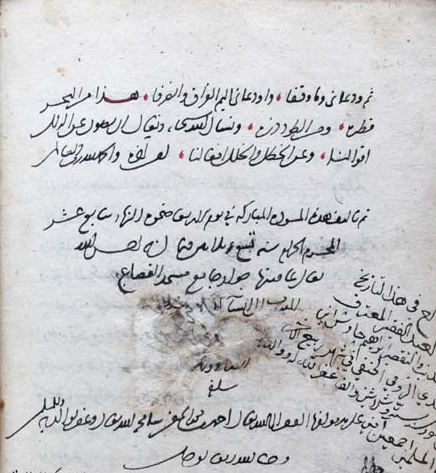
Ahmad ibn Arabshah's work on the Life of Timur

The earliest known history of his reign was Nizam al-Din Shami's Zafarnama, which was written during Timur's lifetime. Between 1424 and 1428, Sharaf ad-Din Ali Yazdi wrote a second Zafarnama drawing heavily on Shami's earlier work. Ahmad ibn Arabshah wrote a much less favorable history in Arabic. Arabshah's history was translated into Latin by the Dutch Orientalist Jacobus Golius in 1636.

As Timurid-sponsored histories, the two Zafarnamas present a dramatically different picture from Arabshah's chronicle. William Jones remarked that the former presented Timur as a "liberal, benevolent and illustrious prince" while the latter painted him as "deformed and impious, of a low birth and detestable principles".

==== Malfuzat-i Timuri ====
The Malfuzat-i Timurī and the appended Tuzūk-i Tīmūrī, supposedly Timur's own autobiography, are almost certainly 17th-century fabrications. The scholar Abu Taleb Hosayni presented the texts to the Mughal emperor Shah Jahan, a distant descendant of Timur, in 1637–1638, supposedly after discovering the Chagatai language originals in the library of a Yemeni ruler. Due to the distance between Yemen and Timur's base in Transoxiana and the lack of any other evidence of the originals, most historians consider the story highly implausible, and suspect Hosayni of inventing both the text and its origin story.

=== European views ===
Timur arguably had a significant impact on the Renaissance culture and early modern Europe. European views of Timur were mixed throughout the fifteenth century, with some European countries calling him an ally and others seeing him as a threat to Europe because of his rapid expansion and brutality.

When Timur captured the Ottoman Sultan Bayezid at Ankara, he was often praised and seen as a trusted ally by European rulers, such as Charles VI of France and Henry IV of England, because they believed he was saving Christianity from the Turkic Empire in the Middle East. Those two kings also praised him because his victory at Ankara allowed Christian merchants to remain in the Middle East and allowed for their safe return home to both France and England. Timur was also praised because it was believed that he helped restore the right of passage for Christian pilgrims to the Holy Land.

Other Europeans viewed Timur as a barbaric enemy who presented a threat to both European culture and the religion of Christianity. His rise to power moved many leaders, such as Henry III of Castile, to send embassies to Samarkand to scout out Timur, learn about his people, make alliances with him, and try to convince him to convert to Christianity in order to avoid war.

In 1794, Sake Dean Mahomed published his travel book, The Travels of Dean Mahomet. The book begins with the praise of Genghis Khan, Timur, and particularly the first Mughal emperor, Babur. He also gives important details on the then incumbent Mughal Emperor Shah Alam II.

The poem "Tamerlane" by Edgar Allan Poe follows a fictionalized version of Timur's life.

In the introduction to a 1723 translation of Yazdi's Zafarnama, the translator wrote:

[M. Petis de la Croix] tells us, that there are calumnies and impostures, which have been published by authors of romances, and Turkish writers who were his enemies, and envious at his glory: among whom is Ahmed Bin Arabschah ... As Timur-Bec had conquered the Turks and Arabians of Syria, and had even taken the Sultan Bajazet prisoner, it is no wonder that he has been misrepresented by the historians of those nations, who, in despite of truth, and against the dignity of history, have fallen into great excesses on this subject.

=== Exhumation and alleged curse ===
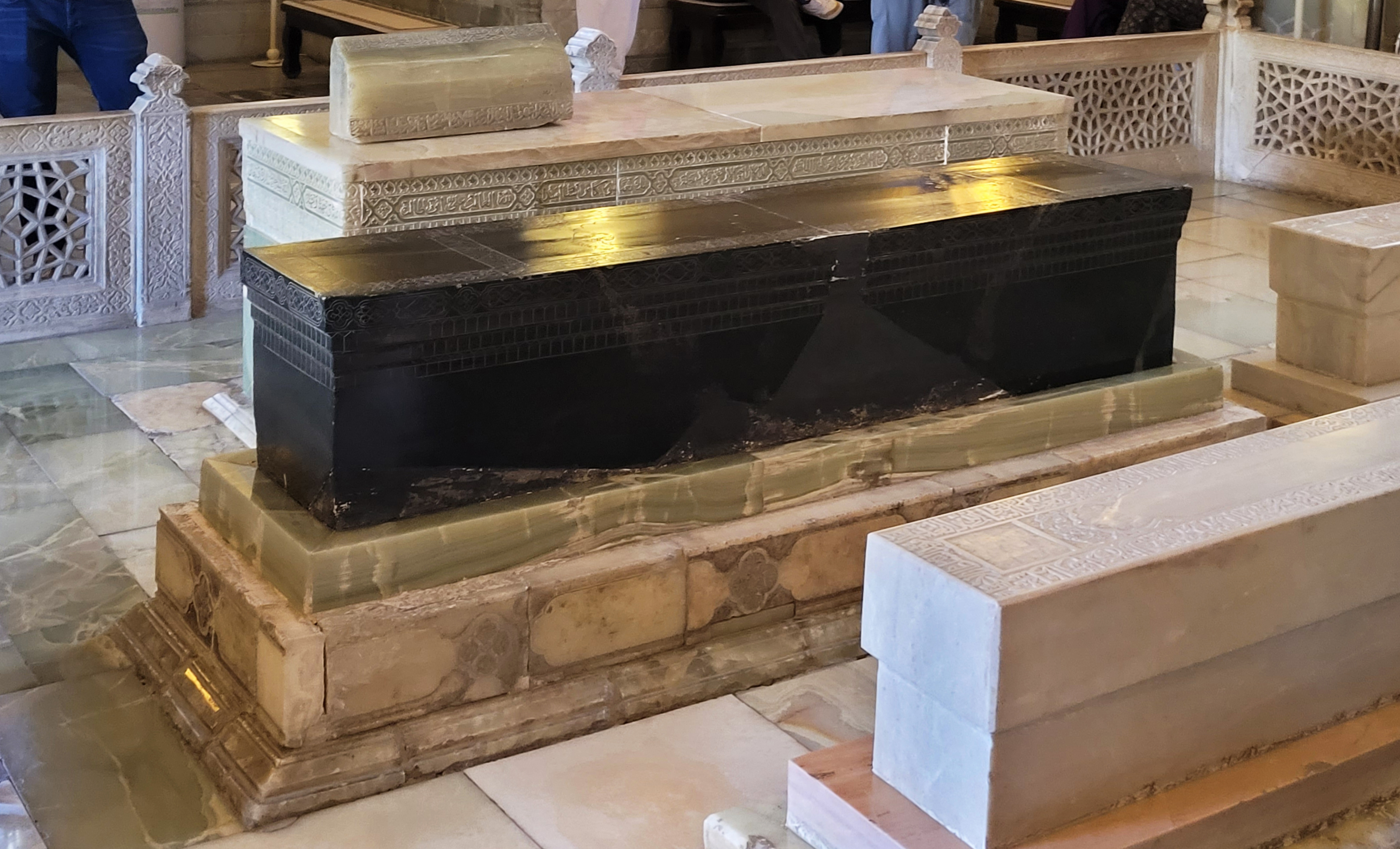
Tomb of Timur in Gur-e-Amir, Samarkand

Timur's body was exhumed from his tomb on 19 June 1941 and his remains examined by the Soviet anthropologists Mikhail M. Gerasimov, Lev V. Oshanin and V. Ia. Zezenkova. Gerasimov reconstructed the likeness of Timur from his skull and found that his facial characteristics displayed "typical Mongoloid features", i.e. East Asian in modern terms. An anthropologic study of Timur's cranium shows that he belonged predominately to the "South Siberian Mongoloid type". At 5 feet 8 inches (173 centimeters), Timur was tall for his era. The examinations confirmed that Timur was lame and had a withered right arm due to his injuries. His right thighbone had knitted together with his kneecap, and the configuration of the knee joint suggests that he kept his leg bent at all times and therefore would have had a pronounced limp. He appears to have been broad-chested and his hair and beard were red.

It is alleged that Timur's tomb was inscribed with the words, "When I rise from the dead, the world shall tremble". It is also said that when Gerasimov exhumed the body, an additional inscription inside the casket was found, which read, "Whomsoever [sic] opens my tomb shall unleash an invader more terrible than I." Even though people close to Gerasimov claim that this story is a fabrication, it became known as the Curse of Timur. In any case, three days after Gerasimov began the exhumation, Germany invaded the Soviet Union, which resulted in one of the deadliest invasions in human history. Timur was re-buried with full Islamic ritual in November 1942, just before the Soviet victory at the Battle of Stalingrad.

=== In the arts ===
- Tamburlaine the Great, Parts I and II (English, 1563–1594): play by Christopher Marlowe
- Tamerlan ou la mort de Bajazet [Tamerlane or the Death of Bajazet] (1675): play by Jacques Pradon
- Tamerlane (1701): play by Nicholas Rowe (English)
- Tamerlano (1724): opera by George Frideric Handel, in Italian, based on the 1675 Pradon play
- Bajazet (1735): opera by Antonio Vivaldi, portrays the capture of Bayezid I by Timur
- Il gran Tamerlano (1772): opera by Josef Myslivecek which also portrays the capture of Bayezid I by Timur
- Timour the Tartar (1811): equestrian drama by Matthew Lewis
- Tamerlane (published 1827): first published poem of Edgar Allan Poe
- Turandot (1924): opera by Giacomo Puccini (libretto by Giuseppe Adami and Renato Simoni) in which Timur is the deposed, blind former King of Tartary and father of the protagonist Calaf
- Lord of Samarkand (The Lame Man; published 1932): story by Robert E. Howard in which Timour appears
- Nesimi (1973): Azerbaijani film in which Timur was portrayed by Yusif Veliyev
- Tamerlan (2003): Spanish-language novel by Colombian writer Enrique Serrano
- Day Watch (2006): Russian film in which Tamerlane in his youth is portrayed by Emir Baygazin, and in maturity by Gani Kulzhanov
- Age of Empires II: Definitive Edition (2019): a video game containing a six-chapter campaign titled "Tamerlane"
- Tamerlane: Rise of the Last Conqueror (2026): English-language film depicting Timur's early life up to the deaths of Ilyas Khoja and Amir Husayn

== Wives and concubines ==
Timur had forty-three wives and concubines, and all of these women were also his consorts. Timur made dozens of women his wives and concubines as he conquered their fathers' or erstwhile husbands' lands.

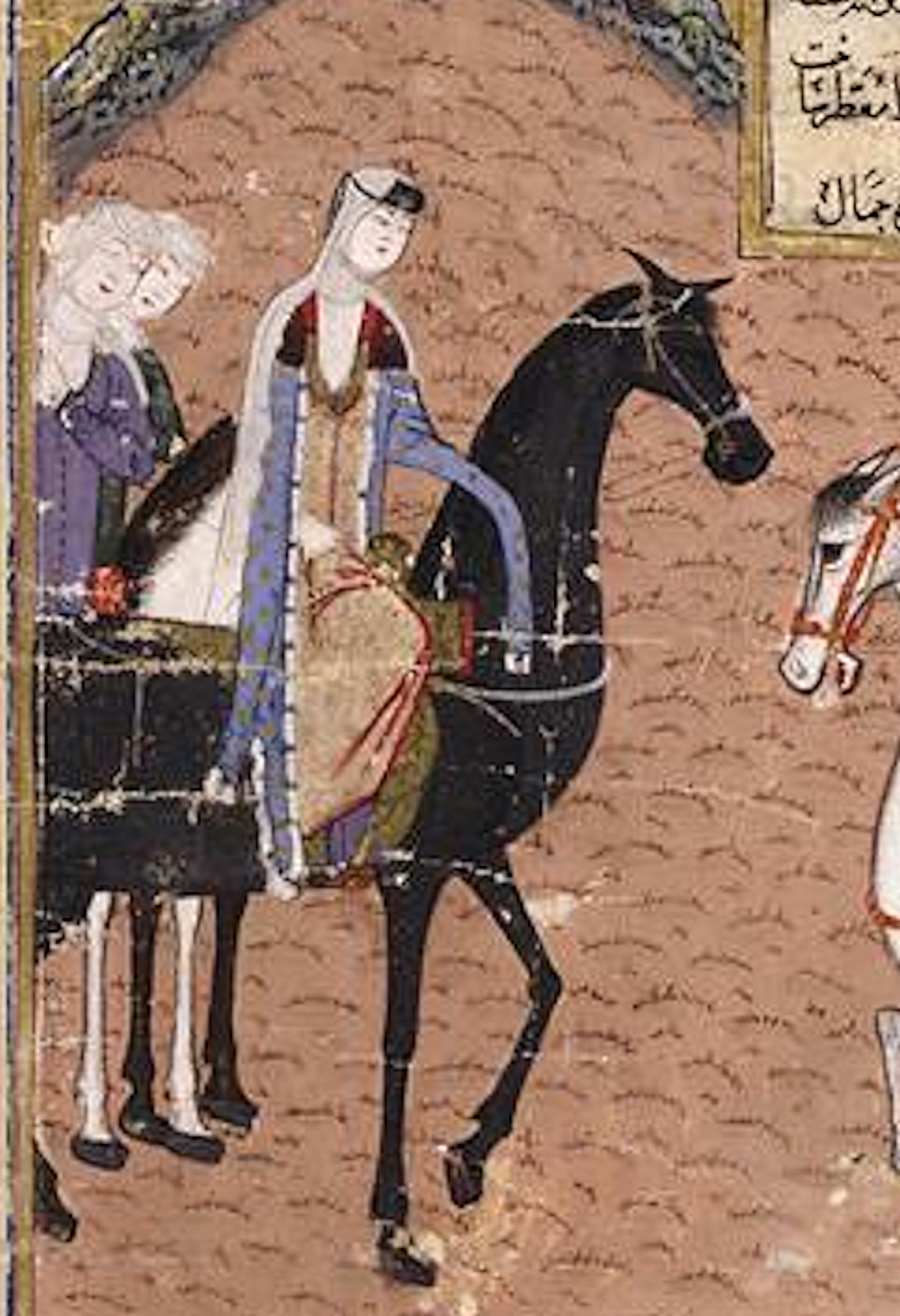
Timur's Empress, Saray Mulk Khanum, former wife of Amir Husayn, visiting Timur in camp in 1387. Zafarnama of 1435-36.

- Turmish Agha, mother of Jahangir Mirza, Jahanshah Mirza and Aka Begi;
- Oljay Turkhan Agha (m. 1357/58), daughter of Amir Mashlah and granddaughter of Amir Qazaghan;
- Saray Mulk Khanum (m. 1367), widow of Amir Husayn, and daughter of Qazan Khan;
- Islam Agha (m. 1367), widow of Amir Husayn, and daughter of Amir Bayan Salduz;
- Ulus Agha (m. 1367), widow of Amir Husayn, and daughter of Amir Khizr Yasuri;
- Dilshad Agha (m. 1374), daughter of Shams ed-Din and his wife Bujan Agha;
- Touman Agha (m. 1377), daughter of Amir Musa and his wife Arzu Mulk Agha, daughter of Amir Bayezid Jalayir;
- Chulpan Mulk Agha, daughter of Haji Beg of Jetah;
- Tukal Khanum (m. 1397), daughter of Mongol Khan Khizr Khawaja Oglan;
- Tolun Agha, concubine, and mother of Umar Shaikh Mirza I;
- Mengli Agha, concubine, and mother of Miran Shah;
- Toghay Turkhan Agha, lady from the Kara Khitai, widow of Amir Husayn, and mother of Shah Rukh;
- Tughdi Bey Agha, daughter of Aq Sufi Qongirat;
- Sultan Aray Agha, a Nukuz lady;
- Malikanshah Agha, a Filuni lady;
- Khand Malik Agha, mother of Ibrahim Mirza;
- Sultan Agha, mother of a son who died in infancy;

His other wives and concubines included: Dawlat Tarkan Agha, Burhan Agha, Jani Beg Agha, Tini Beg Agha, Durr Sultan Agha, Munduz Agha, Bakht Sultan Agha, Nowruz Agha, Jahan Bakht Agha, Nigar Agha, Ruhparwar Agha, Dil Beg Agha, Dilshad Agha, Murad Beg Agha, Piruzbakht Agha, Khoshkeldi Agha, Dilkhosh Agha, Barat Bey Agha, Sevinch Malik Agha, Arzu Bey Agha, Yadgar Sultan Agha, Khudadad Agha, Bakht Nigar Agha, Qutlu Bey Agha, and another Nigar Agha.

== Descendants ==
=== Sons of Timur ===
- Umar Shaikh Mirza I – with Tolun Agha
- Jahangir Mirza – with Turmish Agha
- Miran Shah Mirza – with Mengli Agha
- Shah Rukh Mirza – with Toghay Turkhan Agha

=== Daughters of Timur ===
- Aka Begi (died 1382) – by Turmish Agha. Married to Muhammad Beg, son of Amir Musa Tayichiud
  - Sultan Husayn Tayichiud
- Sultan Bakht Begum (died 1429/30) – by Oljay Turkhan Agha. Married first Muhammad Mirke Apardi, married second, 1389/90, Sulayman Shah Dughlat
- Sa'adat Sultan – by Dilshad Agha
- Bikijan – by Mengli Agha
- Qutlugh Sultan Agha – by Toghay Turkhan Agha

=== Sons of Umar Shaikh Mirza I ===
- Pir Muhammad
- Iskandar
- Rustam
- Bayqara I
  - Mansur
    - Sultan Husayn Bayqarah
      - Badi' al-Zaman
        - Muhammed Mu'min
        - Muhammad Zaman Mirza
      - Muzaffar Hussein
      - Ibrahim Hussein

=== Sons of Jahangir ===
- Muhammad Sultan Mirza
- Pir Muhammad

=== Sons of Miran Shah ===
- Khalil Sultan
- Abu Bakr
- Umar
- Muhammad Mirza
  - Abu Sa'id Mirza
    - Umar Shaikh Mirza II
      - Zahir-ud-din Muhammad Babur
        - the Mughals
      - Jahangir Mirza II

=== Sons of Shah Rukh Mirza ===
- Mirza Muhammad Taraghay – better known as Ulugh Beg
  - Abdul-Latif
- Ghiyath-al-Din Baysunghur
  - Ala al-Dawla Mirza
    - Ibrahim Mirza
  - Sultan Muhammad
    - Yadigar Muhammad
  - Abul-Qasim Babur Mirza
- Sultan Ibrahim Mirza
  - Abdullah Mirza
- Mirza Soyurghatmïsh Khan
- Muhammad Juki

== See also ==
- List of largest empires
- List of wars by death toll
- Muslim conquests in the Indian subcontinent
- Timuri
- Timurlengia

== Citations ==
=== Sources ===
- Crummey, Robert O. (6 June 2014). The Formation of Muscovy 1300 - 1613. Routledge. ISBN 978-1-317-87200-9.
- Foltz, Richard (2019). A History of the Tajiks: Iranians of the East. Bloomsbury Publishing. ISBN 978-1784539559.
- Galeotti, Mark (5 November 2024). Forged in War: A Military History of Russia from Its Beginnings to Today. Bloomsbury USA. ISBN 978-1-4728-6251-8.
- Lee, Joo-Yup (2021). "The Timurid View of the Mongols: An Examination of the Mongol Identity of the Timurids". Iran Namag. 6 (3–4): 200–216.
- Manz, Beatrice Forbes (1989). The Rise and Rule of Tamerlane. Cambridge: Cambridge University Press.
- Manz, Beatrice Forbes (1999). The Rise and Rule of Tamerlane. Cambridge University Press. ISBN 978-0521633840.
- Marozzi, Justin (2004). Tamerlane: Sword of Islam, Conqueror of the World. London, England: HarperCollins. ISBN 9780306815430.
- Mirgaleev, Ilnur; Adygamov, Ramil; Abdurrahman, Husam (2022). "The Personality of Tamerlane in the Works of Medieval Theologians". Golden Horde Review (in Russian). 10 (1): 77–88. doi:10.22378/2313-6197.2022-10-1.77-88.
- Melville, Charles (2020). Melville, Charles (ed.). The Timurid Century: The Idea of Iran, Volume IX. University of Cambridge, Cambridge, England: Bloomsbury Publishing. doi:10.5040/9781838606169. ISBN 978-1838606152. S2CID 242682831.
- Nicol, Donald M. (1993). The Last Centuries of Byzantium, 1261–1453. Cambridge University Press. ISBN 978-0521439916.
- Riasanovsky, Nicholas Valentine; Steinberg, Mark D. (2005). A History of Russia. Oxford University Press. ISBN 978-0-19-515394-1. Archived from the original on 7 September 2024.
- Tsai, Shih-Shan Henry (2002). Perpetual Happiness: the Ming Emperor Yongle. Seattle, Washington: University of Washington Press. ISBN 978-0295981246. OCLC 870409962.
- This article incorporates text from a publication now in the public domain: Goldsmid, Frederic John (1911). "Timūr". In Chisholm, Hugh (ed.). Encyclopædia Britannica. Vol. 26 (11th ed.). Cambridge University Press. pp. 994–995.

Timur Timurid dynasty
Preceded by None	Timurid Empire; 1370–1405	Succeeded by Pir Muhammad ibn Jahangir and Khalil Sultan
