= Sack of Sebaste (1400) =

Sacking of Sebaste during the Ottoman-Timurid War

- Part of Ottoman-Timurid War
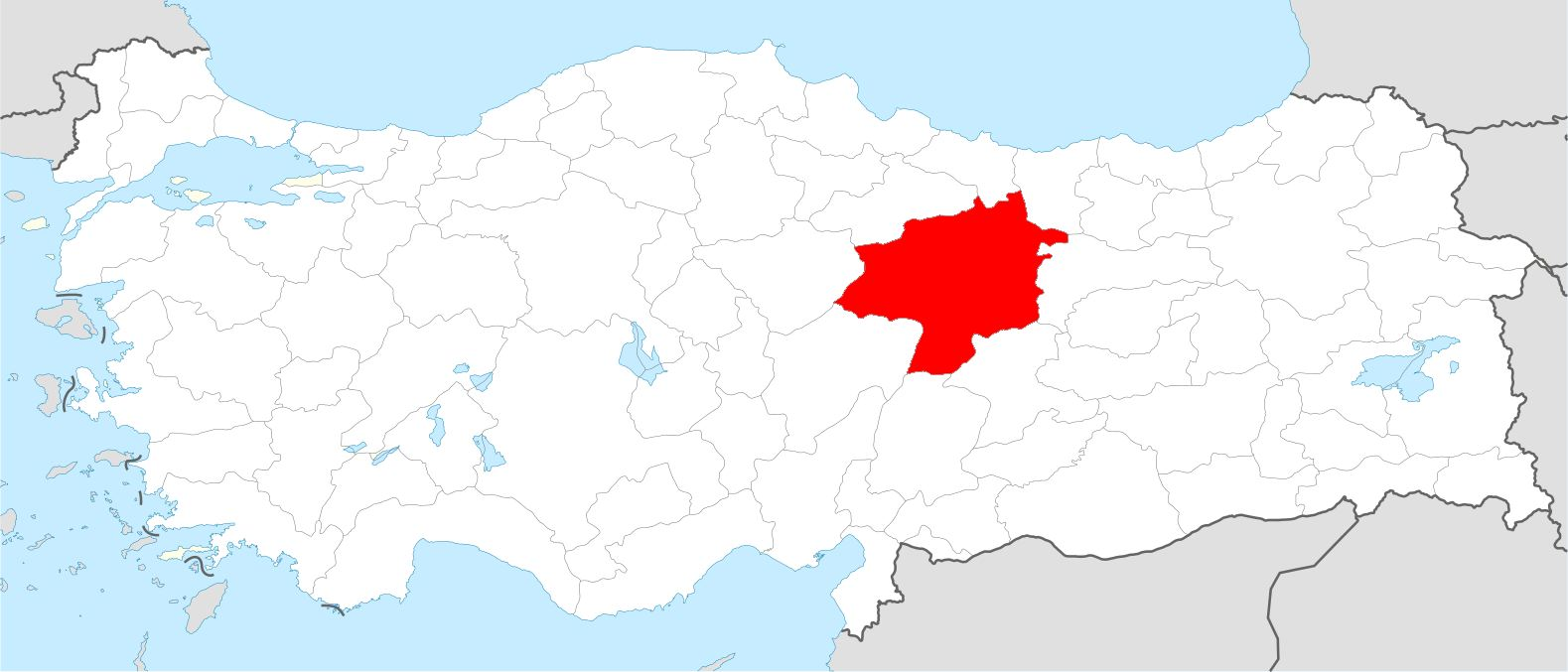
- map of Sebaste
Location
Result
Sebaste, Anatolia
39°45′02″N 37°00′54″E
Timurid victory
- Massacre of Sebaste

Belligerents
Timurid Empire	Ottoman Empire

Commanders and leaders
Timur	Süleyman Çelebi
- 3,000 Armenian Christians civilians killed

The Sack of Sebaste in 1400 was one of Timur's campaigns in Anatolia. It was one of the first events of the Ottoman-Timurid War, which led to a famous massacre in the city of Sivas. This was also part of Timur's campaigns across the Middle East.

== Background ==
the Ottoman Empire began growing quickly in Anatolia and the Balkans. In 1398, Sultan Bayezid I took control of the city of Sebaste and removed its ruler Kadi Burhan Ahmed. This move made Sebaste a key part of Ottoman territory in eastern Anatolia. During this same period, the Timurid Empire was expanding in the East under the leader Timur. Conflict began when Timur demanded that Bayezid pay tribute for the Emirate of Erzincan. The ruler of Erzincan Taharten, was a loyal follower of Timur. Bayezid I refused the demand, viewing it as a major insult to his power. At the time, Bayezid was busy leading a siege against the city of Constantinople. However, realizing the danger from the East, he moved his entire army to Sebaste before winter to prepare for the Timurid threat. He also sent his son, Suleiman, to the region with extra military forces.

== Battle and massacre ==
In the year 1400, Timur started moving for the invasion. He took the northern route, the same one the Mongol Empire took in 1243 to invade Eastern Anatolia in the Battle of Köse Dağ. When Timur arrived at Sebaste, the city had many things belonging to the Turks, like Seljuk schools and mosques. The siege did not last long. in August, the city and those in it surrendered because the siege was so strong. Timur committed a massacre to teach Bayezid a lesson he would never forget. He left the Muslims alone and did not kill them, while many Christian residents were enslaved and captured. 3,000 Christian Armenian soldiers were killed. Timur had made a promise and pledged that he would not shed a single drop of their blood if they surrendered. After they surrendered, Timur fulfilled his promise but in an extremely brutal way. He ordered trenches to be dug in the ground and buried thousands of Armenian soldiers alive. He was proud that he had fulfilled his promise.

== Aftermath ==
Then, Timur ended the siege in Anatolia and moved toward the Mamluks. He captured the cities of Aleppo and Damascus. At the same time, Sultan Bayezid stopped his siege of Constantinople and prepared for any possible attack. However, after that, the Battle of Ankara took place. Bayezid and many of his soldiers were captured.

== See also ==
- Battle of Ankara
- Ottoman wars in Asia
- Timurid conquests and invasions
- Siege of Damascus (1400)
- Sack of Aleppo (1400)
