= Siege of Astrakhan (1395) =

Siege during the Tokhtamysh–Timur war

- Part of the Tokhtamysh–Timur war
| Date | 1395 |
| Location | Eastern Europe, Volga, modern-city Astrakhan |
| Result | Timurid victory |

Belligerents
| Golden Horde | Timurid Empire |

Commanders and leaders
| Tokhtamysh | Timur |

The Siege of Astrakhan (1395) was a sacking event that took place where the forces of Timur, the leader of the Timurid Empire, begins to attack the city.

The event as well took place during the winter season. The siege ended in Timur victory, which destroyed and conquered the city under the Timurid Empire.

Although it was destroyed by Timur, it still remained as small yet an important place on the international trade route from the Upper Volga to the Caspian Sea.
