= Gürkan Ekren =

Turkish footballer

Personal information
- Full name: Gürkan Ekren
- Date of birth: August 2, 1974 (age 52)
- Place of birth: Soma, Manisa, Turkey
- Height: 1.83 m (6 ft 0 in)
- Position: Goalkeeper

Senior career*
Years	Team	Apps	(Gls)
1996–1999	Soma Linyitspor	26	(0)
1999–2002	Bucaspor	78	(0)
2002–2004	Manisaspor	2	(0)
2003–2004	→ İzmirspor (loan)	20	(0)
2004–2007	Eskişehirspor	16	(0)
2007	Tokatspor	13	(0)
2007–2008	Kütahyaspor	4	(0)
2008–2011	Akhisar Belediyespor	55	(0)
2011–2012	Altay	2	(0)
- * Club domestic league appearances and goals as of 24 February 2012

Gürkan Ekren (born 2 August 1974) is a Turkish professional footballer who plays as a goalkeeper.
