= Ibn Arabshah =

Arab writer and traveller (1389–1450 CE)

Ibn Arabshah Abu Muhammad Shihab al-Din Ahmad ibn Muhammad ibn Abd Allah ibn Ibrahim أبو محمد شهاب الدين أحمد بن محمد بن عبد الله بن إبراهيم
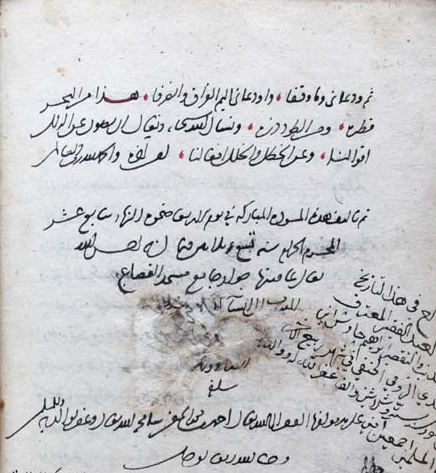
- The autograph of Ahmad ibn Arabshah, Aja'ib al-Maqdur fi Akhbar Taymur, dated 839, Adilnor Collection
- Born: 1389; Damascus, Mamluk Sultanate
- Died: 1450 (aged 60–61); Egypt, Mamluk Sultanate
- Resting place: Egypt
- Occupations: Arab writer, traveller and Historian
- Writing career
- Pen name: Ibn Arabshah
- Language: Arabic
- Period: 9th Islamic century

Abu Muhammad Shihab al-Din Ahmad ibn Muhammad ibn Abd Allah ibn Ibrahim also known as Muhammad ibn Arabshah (Arabic: ابن عَرَبْشَاه; 1389–1450), was an Arab writer and traveller who lived under the reign of Timur (1370–1405).

Arabshah was born and grew up in Damascus. Later when Timur invaded Syria, he was taken prisoner, along with his mother and sister, and transported as a slave to Samarkand and later to Transoxiana. Arabshah later moved to Edirne and worked in the court of Sultan Mehmed I translating Arabic books to Turkish and Persian. He later returned to Damascus after having been absent from the city for 23 years. In his critical biography of Timur, Aja'ib al-Maqdur, written in Arabic, Arabshah highlighted Timur's illiteracy of Arabic and his preference for Persian literature. Later he moved to Egypt and died there.

The famous Muslim scholar, Abd al-Wahhab ibn Arabshah, was his son.

== His works ==
- Aja'ib al-Maqdur fi Nawa'ib al-Taymur (The Wonders of Destiny of the Ravages of Timur), which he finished in Damascus on 12 August 1435. This book was translated and printed first time in Latin; Ahmedis Arabsiadae Vitae & rerum gestarum Timuri, qui vulgo Tamerlanes dicitur, historia. Lugduni Batavorum, ex typographia Elseviriana, 1636.
- al-Ta'lif al-tahir fi shiyam al-Malik al-Zahir (Life of Zahir)
- Fakihat al-Khulafa' wa Mufakahat al-Zurafa'
- Jami' al-Hikayat; translated from Persian to Turkish.
- al-'Aqd al-Farid fi al-Tawhid
- Ghurrat al-Siyar fi Duwal al-Turk wa al-Tatar
- Muntaha al-Adab fi Lughat al-Turk wa al-Ajam wa al-'Arab

== Sources ==
- Woods, John E. (1987). "The Rise of Tīmūrid Historiography". Journal of Near Eastern Studies. 46 (2 (Apr.)): 81–108.
