= Umut A. Gurkan =

Turkish–American mechanical and biomedical engineer

- Born: Turkey

Academic background
- Education: BSc, Chemical Engineering and Mechanical Engineering, Middle East Technical University; PhD, Biomedical Engineering, 2010, Purdue University
- Thesis: Engineering of bone marrow in vitro for investigating the role of growth factors and their mechanoresponsiveness in osteogenesis (2010)

Academic work
- Institutions: Case Western Reserve University

Umut Atakan Gurkan is a Turkish–American mechanical and biomedical engineer. As the Wilbert J. Austin Professor of Engineering at Case Western Reserve University, Gurkan investigates hemoglobin, red blood cells, blood rheology and microcirculation in health and disease and with targeted therapies and gene-based cures.

== Early life and education ==
Gurkan was born and raised in Turkey. He earned two Bachelor of Science degrees in Chemical Engineering and Mechanical Engineering from Middle East Technical University before moving to North America and attending Purdue University. As a PhD candidate at Purdue, Gurkan received the 2009 Geddes-Laufman-Greatbatch Award as an outstanding student for an academic year and was later recognized as an outstanding graduate researcher. He published his PhD dissertation in 2010, entitled Engineering of bone marrow in vitro for investigating the role of growth factors and their mechanoresponsiveness in osteogenesis. Following his PhD, Gurkan completed his postdoctoral fellowship at the Harvard–MIT Program in Health Sciences and Technology. In this role, he led the development of a simple and inexpensive way to create three-dimensional brain tissues in a lab dish.

== Career ==
Following his postdoctoral fellowship, Gurkan joined the faculty at Case Western Reserve University as an assistant professor of mechanical and aerospace engineering. In this role, he focused his research on sickle cell disease and earned numerous grants to fund his studies. In December 2013, his research team received a Doris Duke Foundation award to "discover how to predict when sickle cell disease patients will suffer an acute crisis and monitor the effectiveness of treatments." He also accepted the Belcher-Weir Family Pediatric Innovation Award for his project "Functional Complete Blood Count for Children with Sickle Cell Disease via Easy-to-Use Biochip." The following year, Gurkan began working with Hemex Health on developing a portable diagnostic platform to test sickle cell disease. At the same time, Gurkan and colleague Glenn Wera received the inaugural Advanced Platform Technology Center Steven Garverick Innovation Incentive award for their collaborative research, "Synovial Fluid Biochip for Monitoring Joint and Prosthesis Health." The aim of this project was to develop micro/nano-scale technologies for biomanufacturing complex multiscale biological systems and microengineered methods for rare cell isolation and manipulation. He was later recognized on the MIT Technology Review's Innovators Under 35—Turkey list for his work on developing a biochip for sickle cell anemia.

As a result of his research into improving human health via research in cell mechanics to develop biosensors and point-of-care systems, Gurkan was elected to receive the 2016 Rising Star award by the Biomedical Engineering Society. Following this, he developed SMART (Sickle and Malaria Accurate Remote Testing) as a diagnostic tool that links with electronic health record systems to diagnose, track and monitor sickle cell disease and malaria patients in low-resource settings. The tool earned his research team the 2018 first prize in the Vodafone Americas Foundation Wireless Innovation competition. In 2020, Gurkan and his research team received funding from the National Heart, Lung, and Blood Institute to assess emerging genome-editing based therapies being tested for curing sickle cell disease. He also launched the Gazelle Diagnostic platform that uses artificial intelligence and microchip technology to make a quick diagnosis. In February 2022, Gurkan's work was recognized with an election to the American Institute for Medical and Biological Engineering.

Outside of Case Western, Gurkan was named a senior member of the 2020 Class of National Academy of Inventors Fellows for his diagnostic tools and effort to curb sickle cell disease. He was also named a finalist for the 2021 Curtis W. McGraw Research Award which recognizes significant achievements of early career researchers and educators. Later that year, Gurkan was nominated by scientific officers at the National Institutes of Health to serve a four-year term on their federal advisory committee. In October 2021, Gurkan was selected as a member of the 2021–23 National Academies of Sciences, Engineering, and Medicine's "New Voices" cohort.
