= Timurid family tree =

This is a simplified family tree of the Timurid dynasty. The Timurid dynasty was a ruling house descended from the Central Asian conqueror Timur, who founded the Timurid Empire in 1370. At its peak, the empire encompassed Iran and much of Central Asia, as well as portions of modern-day India, Pakistan, Syria and Turkey. Following its fall in the early 16th century, Timur's great-great-great grandson Babur established the Mughal Empire in South Asia, becoming the first Mughal emperor. His descendants eventually came to rule most of the Indian subcontinent.

== Timurid dynasty ==
Timurid family tree

1. Timur (1336–1405); Ruler of the Timurid Empire r.1370–1405
Umar Shaikh I (1356–1394)	Jahangir I (1356–1376)	Miran Shah (1366–1408)	3. Shah Rukh (1377–1447); Ruler of the Timurid Empire r.1407–1447
Pir Muhammad (1379–1409)	Rustam (1381–1424/5)	Iskandar (1384–1415)	Bayqara (1392–1422)	Muhammad Sultan (1375–1403)	2. Pir Muhammad (1374–1407); Ruler of the Timurid Empire r.1405–1407	1. Khalil Sultan (1384–1411); Ruler of Samarkand r.1405–1409	Sultan Muhammad	4. Ulugh Beg (1393–1449); Ruler of the Timurid Empire r.1447–1449	Ibrahim Sultan (1394–1435)	Muhammad Juki (1402–1444)	Baysunghur (1399–1437)
Mansur (d.1446)	5. Abu Sa'id (1424–1469); Ruler of the Timurid Empire; Ruler of Samarkand r.1451–1469 Ruler of Herat r.1459–1469	3. Abdal-Latif (1420–1450); Ruler of Samarkand r.1449–1450	2. ‘Abdullah (1410–1451); Ruler of Samarkand r.1450–1451	Ala al-Dawla (1417–1460)	2. Abul-Qasim Babur (1427–1457); Ruler of Herat r.1451–1457	1. Sultan Muhammad (1418–1452); Ruler of Herat r.1447–1451
6. Sultan Husayn Bayqara (1438–1506); Ruler of Herat r.1469–1506	5. Sultan Ahmad (1451–1494); Ruler of Samarkand r.1469–1494	1. Umar Shaikh II (1456–1494); Ruler of Ferghana r.1469–1494	6. Sultan Mahmud (1453–1495); Ruler of Badakhshan r.1469–1495 Ruler of Samarkand r.1494–1495	1. Ulugh Beg II (d.1502); Ruler of Kabul and Ghazni r.1469–1502	4. Ibrahim (1440–1459); Ruler of Herat r.1457–1459	3. Mahmud (d.1457); Ruler of Herat r.1457	7. Yadigar Muhammad (1452–1470); Ruler of Herat r.1470
8. Badi' al-Zaman (d.1517); Ruler of Herat r.1506–1507	9. Muzaffar Husayn (d.1507/8); Ruler of Herat r.1507	Babur (1483–1530); Sometime ruler of Ferghana, Samarqand and Kabul; Founder of the Mughal Empire	3. Jahangir II (d.1507/8); Ruler of Ferghana r.1497–1498	2. Abdur Razaq; Ruler of Kabul and Ghazni (d.1509) r.1502
Muhammad Zaman Mirza (1496–1539)	Mughal emperors

Notes:
- Woods, John E. (1990), The Timurid Dynasty, Papers on Inner Asia No. 14, Bloomington: Indiana University, Research Institute for Inner Asian Studies.

== Mughal emperors ==
Mughal family tree

1. Babur; (1526-1530)
2. Humayun; (1508 –1556)	Masuma Sultan Begum	Kamran Mirza (1512 –1557)	Gulchehra Begum	Askari Mirza (1518 –1557)	Hindal Mirza (1519 –1551)	Gulbadan Begum	Gulrukh Begum
3. Akbar; (1542 –1605)	Mirza Muhammad Hakim (1553 –1585)
4. Jahangir; (1569 –1627)	Shahzada Khanam	Shah Murad (1570- 1599)	Daniyal (1572- 1604)	Shakarunnisa Begum	Aram Banu Begum
Sultan Nisar Begum	Khusrau Mirza (1587 –1622)	Parvez (1590- 1626)	Bahar Banu Begum	5. Shah Jahan; (1592 –1666)	Lizzat-un-nisa Begum	Jahandar	Shahrayar (1605 –1628)
Jahanara Begum	Dara Shikoh (1615- 1659)	Shah Shuja (1616-1661)	Roshanara Begum	6. Aurangzeb; (1618 –1707)	Murad Baksh (1624 - 1661)
7. Muhammad Azam Shah; (1653 - 1707)	8. Bahadur Shah I Shah Alam I; (1643 –1712)	Muhammad Akbar (1657- 1706)	Muhammad Kam Bakhsh (1667- 1709)
Azim-ush-Shan (1664 –1712)	Rafi-ush-Shan (1671 –1712)	9. Jahandar Shah; (1661 –1713)	Khujista Akhtar (1673- 1712)	Neku Siyar (1679- 1723)	Muhi us-Sunnat (1690- 1747)
10. Farrukhsiyar; (1683 –1719)	12. Shah Jahan II; (1696 –1719)	11. Rafi'u-d-Darjat; (1699 –1719)	Jahangir II (1703 –1746)	15. Alamgir II; (1699 –1759)	13. Muhammad Shah; (1702 –1748)	16. Shah Jahan III; (1711- 1772)
17. Shah Alam II; (1728 –1806)	14. Ahmad Shah Bahadur; (1725 –1775)
19. Akbar Shah II; (1760 –1837)	18. Shah Jahan IV; Bedar Bakht; (1749- 1790)
20. Bahadur Shah II Zafar; (1775 –1862)
