= Jalal al-Din Mahmud Khwarazmi =

Khwaja Jalal al-Din Mahmud Khwarazmi was a bureaucrat and commander who served under the Timurid Empire in the early 15th century. During his early career, he served the Timurid princes Pir Muhammad and Iskandar in the city of Shiraz. He later moved with Iskandar to the city of Isfahan, where he served as one of the leading commanders in two expeditions, first against the city of Yazd in 1409/10, and the second against the southeastern cities of Bam and Jiruft in 1411/2. Mahmud later returned to Shiraz to serve under Ibrahim Sultan.

== Sources ==
- Manz, Beatrice Forbes (2007). Power, Politics and Religion in Timurid Iran. Cambridge University Press. ISBN 978-1-139-46284-6.
