= Soyurghatmish Mirza =

Prince of the Timurid dynasty (1399–1426)

Soyurghatmish
- Timurid Prince
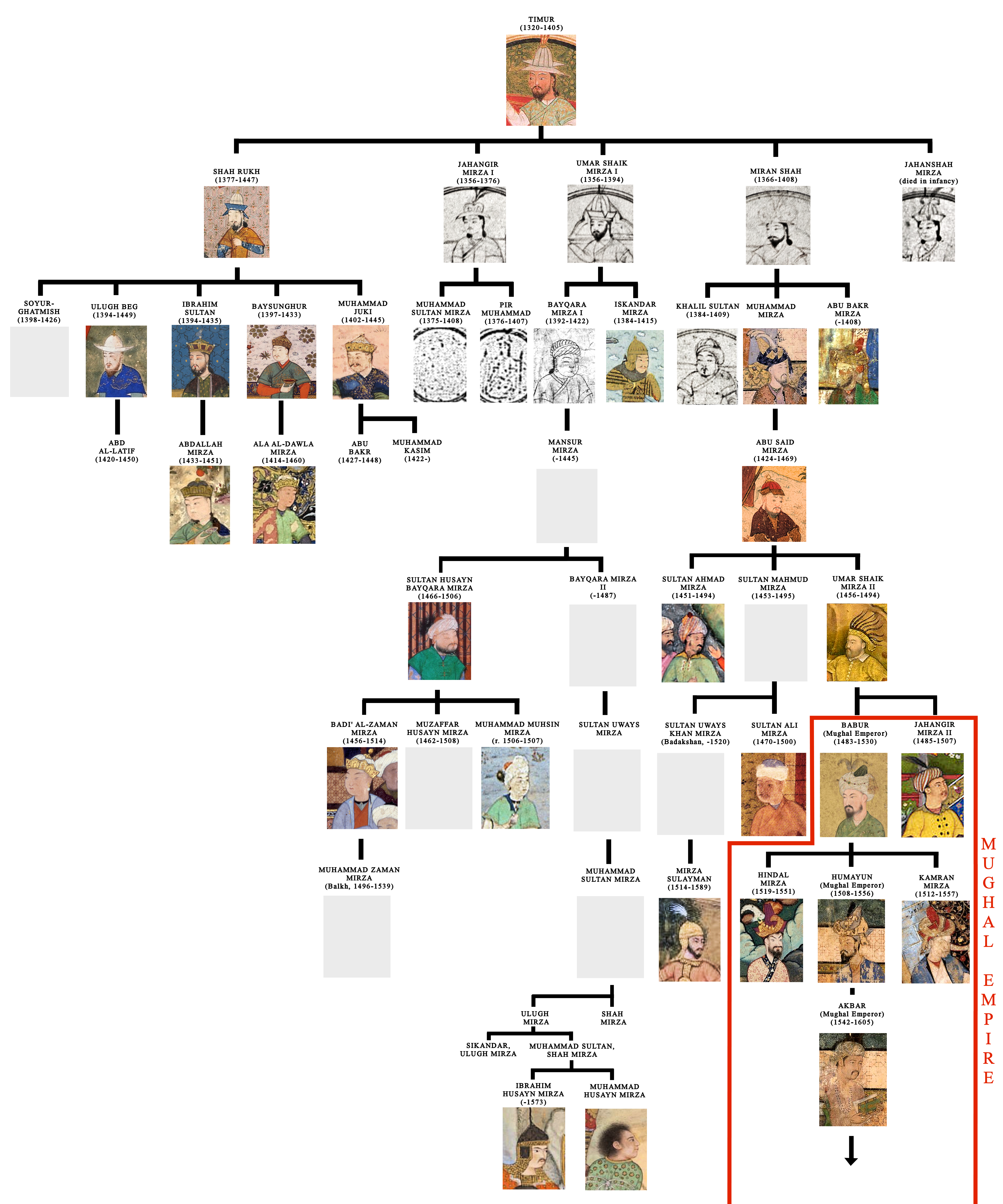
- Soyurghatmish Mirza was a son of Shah Rukh
- Born: 1399
- Died: 17 November 1426 (aged 26–27)
- Issue: Sultan Masud Mirza
Names
- Soyurghatmish Mirza
- House: House of Timur
- Father: Shah Rukh
- Mother: Malikat Agha
- Religion: Islam

Soyurghatmish or Soyurghatmish Mirza (1399 – 17 November 1426) was a Timurid prince and a son of the Timurid Emperor Shah Rukh and his wife Malikat Agha. He became Timurid Viceroy of India and Ghazni.

In 1413, when his father left for Mazandaran to begin a campaign against Qara Yusuf Qara Qoyunlu the following year, he left Soyurghatmish as governor-general in Herat. He was also possibly in charge of Balkh from 1414. Iskandar sent a servant named Kafi Islam that winter to incite rebellion in Sistan and Kandahar, but Kafi Islam was recognized at the caravanserai of Exteran by a servant of the daroga of Tabas, who informed his lord, and the latter informed Soyurghatmish, who alerted Malik Qutb al-Din in Sistan with orders to have Kafi Islam arrested and brought to Herat. This was done, and from the capital he was sent to Shah Rukh's army.

Later, there were internal conflicts in Badakhshan and Shah Rukh appointed his son Soyurghatmish to govern and administer the country; in August 1417 the prince moved to Badakhshan with a military contingent and soon restored tranquility. The emperor allowed the former Shah Baha al-Din to reside in the country under the authority of Soyurghatmish.

In 1417/1418 Prince Qaydu ibn Pir Muhammad was deposed from his governorships of Kabul, Ghazni and Kandahar and the lands up to the Indus and the emperor granted them to his son Soyurghatmish.

Around 1420 or 1421 the tribal chief Jasrat Khokhar, after defeating an old enemy, Raja Bhim of Jammu, invaded the territory of the Timurid-supported Sayyid dynasty of the Delhi Sultanate, and ravaged the districts of Dipalpur and Lahore; Sikandar Tuhfa, amir of the Delhi Sultanate emperor Mubarak Shah, encountered him in battle, but withdrew for lack of forces and left him free. At this time it was learned that the governor of Multan, Alaul Mulk, had died, and that Shaykh Ali, the deputy governor of Kabul on behalf of Soyurghatmish, intended to invade the western Punjab and Sindh region. Shaykh Ali attacked and plundered Multan but did not remain there. Malik Mahmud Hasan was sent as an emissary from Delhi to Multan to restore confidence.

Upon his death in 1426 at the age of 28, he was succeeded by his son Sultan Masud Mirza.

== Sources ==
- Manz, Beatrice Forbes (1 March 2007). Power, Politics and Religion in Timurid Iran. Cambridge University Press. ISBN 978-1-139-46284-6.
- Jackson, Peter (6 February 2024). From Genghis Khan to Tamerlane: The Reawakening of Mongol Asia. Yale University Press. ISBN 978-0-300-27504-9.
- Binbaş, İlker Evrim (26 May 2016). Intellectual Networks in Timurid Iran: Sharaf al-Dīn 'Alī Yazdī and the Islamicate Republic of Letters. Cambridge University Press. ISBN 978-1-107-05424-0.
