= Mansur Mirza =

- Timurid Prince
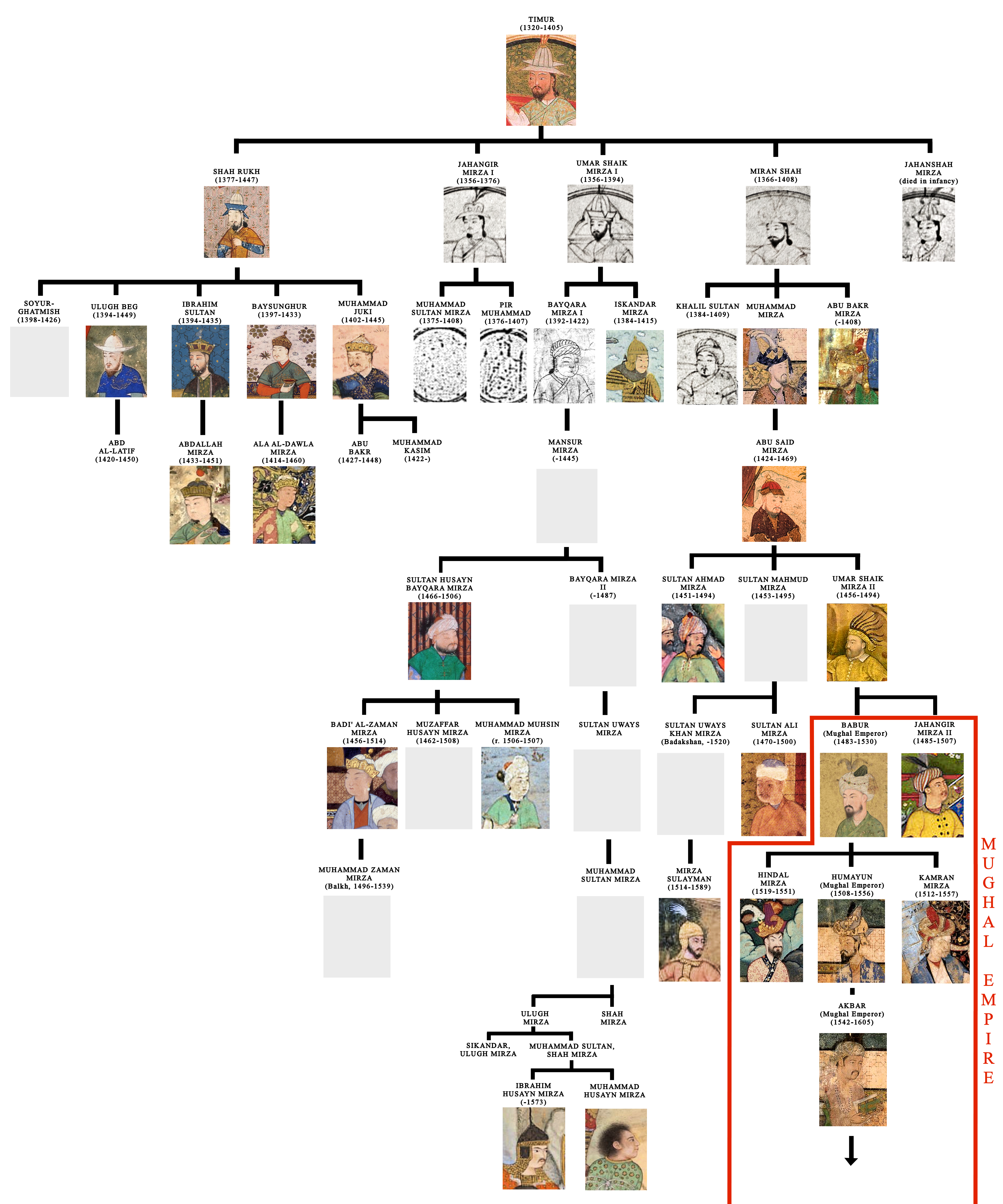
- Mansur Mirza in Timurid genealogy
- Died: 1445
- Issue: Darvish Muhammad; Muhammad Badi; Muhammad Muzaffar; Shahrbanu; Mihr Nigar; Bayqara Mirza II (d.1487); Aka Biki; Badi al-Jamal; Sultan Husayn Bayqara (1438–1506); Urun Sultan Khanum
- Dynasty: House of Timur
- Father: Bayqara Mirza I
- Religion: Islam

Mansur Mirza, or Ghiyas ud-din Mansur Mirza (died 1445-46), was a Timurid prince, and a son of Bayqara Mirza I. He was the father of the famous late-Timurid sultan of Herat Sultan Husayn Bayqara (1469-1506).

Mansur Mirza was a great-grandson of the Central Asian conqueror Timur. Mansur Mirza's wife Firuza was the daughter of Sultan Husayn of the powerful Tayichiud tribe. Firuza was also herself a great-granddaughter of Timur twice over. Mansur Mirza and Firuza were also descendants of the Mongol Emperor, Genghis Khan.

== Sources ==
- Subtelny, Maria (1988). "Centralizing Reform and Its Opponents in the Late Timurid Period". Iranian Studies. 21 (1/2): 129–151. doi:10.1080/00210868808701712. JSTOR 4310597. (registration required)
- Subtelny, Maria (2007). Timurids in Transition: Turko-Persian Politics and Acculturation in Medieval Iran, Volume 7. BRILL. ISBN 9789004160316.
- Woods, John E. (1990), The Timurid dynasty, Indiana University, Research Institute for Inner Asian Studies
