= Malikat Agha =

- Consort of the Timurid Empire
- Died: before 1447
- Burial: Balkh, Timurid Empire
- Spouses: Umar Shaikh Mirza I Shah Rukh
- Issue: Pir Muhammad; Iskandar; Bayqara; Ahmad; Soyurghatmish
- House: Borjigin (by birth); Timurid dynasty (by marriage)
- Father: Khizr Ughlan
- Religion: Islam

Malikat Agha was a Mongol princess as well as one of the wives of Shah Rukh, ruler of the Timurid Empire.

== Life ==
Malikat Agha belonged to a minor branch of the Chagatai royal family. Her father Khizr Ughlan, descended from the Khan Baraq, had held an appanage centred on Uzkand. Like many Mongol princesses, she was married into the Timurid dynasty as a means of legitimising the latter's rule. Her husband was Umar Shaikh Mirza I, the eldest son of Timur. Malikat had four sons through this marriage: Pir Muhammad, Iskandar, Bayqara and Ahmad. Following Umar Shaikh's death in 1394, she was remarried to his younger brother Shah Rukh, through whom she had one further son, Soyurghatmish.

In spite of her exalted lineage, upon Shah Rukh's ascension to the throne, Malikat only acted as a junior wife, with the chief wife being the non-royal Gawhar Shad, the daughter of one of Timur's close followers. As such, it is not clear that her influential match brought much advantage to her sons from her first marriage. In fact, it may have been because of these elder sons, most of whom had rebelled in the early years of Shah Rukh's reign, that Malikat had a lower position. This subordinate role even extended to Soyughatmish, who, in comparison to the sons of Gawhar Shad, received a lower military posting from his father, serving in the relatively isolated governorship of Kabul.

Like many Timurid royal women, Malikat had sponsored the construction of religious buildings, such as Sufi khanqahs. One of the first madrassahs in Herat to specialise in teaching medicine was also established under her patronage, alongside a similar institution in Balkh which further served as a caravansary.

It was in this last structure that she was eventually buried, having predeceased her second husband, but outliving several of her sons.

== Bibliography ==
- Arbabzadah, Nushin (2017), "Women and Religious Patronage in the Timurid Empire", in Nile Green (ed.), Afghanistan's Islam: From Conversion to the Taliban, Oakland: University of California Press, pp. 56–70, ISBN 978-0-520-29413-4, JSTOR 10.1525/j.ctt1kc6k3q.8
- Bosworth, Clifford Edmund; Asimov, M.S. (2002), History of Civilizations of Central Asia, vol. IV, Part Two, Delhi: Motilal Banarsidass Publ., ISBN 978-81-208-1596-4
- Glassen, E (December 15, 1989), "BĀYQARĀ B. ʿOMAR ŠAYḴ", Encyclopaedia Iranica, Encyclopaedia Iranica Foundation
- Jackson, Peter (2023). From Genghis Khan to Tamerlane: The Reawakening of Mongol Asia. Yale University Press. ISBN 978-0-300-27504-9.
- Manz, Beatrice Forbes (2007), Power, Politics and Religion in Timurid Iran, Cambridge: Cambridge University Press, ISBN 978-1-139-46284-6
- Nashat, Guity; Beck, Lois (2003), Women in Iran from the Rise of Islam to 1800, University of Illinois Press, ISBN 978-0-252-07121-8
- Rizvi, Kishwar (2011). The Safavid Dynastic Shrine: Architecture, Religion and Power in Early Modern Iran. London, New York: I.B.Tauris. ISBN 978-1-84885-354-6.
- Woods, John E. (1990), The Timurid dynasty, Indiana University, Research Institute for Inner Asian Studies
