= Rustam Mirza =

Timurid prince (1381 – 1424/25)

- Timurid Prince
- Born: 1381
- Died: 1424/25 (aged 42–44)
- Issue: See below
- Dynasty: House of Timur
- Father: Umar Shaikh Mirza I
- Mother: Qutlugh Tarkhan Agha
- Religion: Islam

Rustam Mirza (1381 – 1424/25) was a Timurid prince and a grandson of the Central Asian conqueror Timur by his eldest son Umar Shaikh Mirza I.

Never ruling as an independent monarch, Rustam Mirza is primarily associated with his governance over the city of Isfahan, which he gained and lost multiple times in the power struggles following Timur's death.

== Early life and background ==
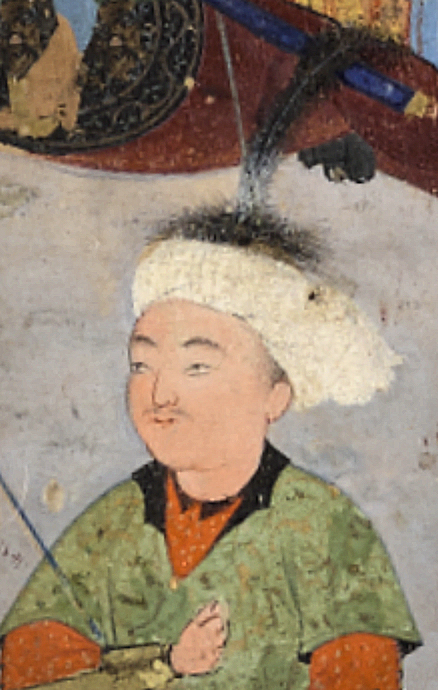
Portrait of Umar Shaikh Mirza I, father of Rustam Mirza, leading the attack on Urgench in 1379. Garrett Zafarnama, painted in 1480

Rustam was born in 1381 and was the only son of Umar Shaikh Mirza I by his wife, Qutlugh Tarkhan Agha. His father, the eldest of the four sons of Timur, died in 1394 when Rustam was about thirteen years old. Rustam later became involved in the military, being active during the final decade of his grandfather's life. When his half-brother Pir Muhammad earned Timur's ire, Rustam was given the former's position as governor of Fars. After his brother returned to their grandfather's good graces in 1402, Rustam was transferred to the rule of Isfahan.

== Timurid wars ==
Following Timur's death in 1405, a power struggle erupted amongst his descendants, though the sons of Umar Shaikh were at least nominally now under the suzerainty of their uncle Shah Rukh. Rustam, still governor of Isfahan, allied himself with his cousin Umar, son of Miran Shah. The two princes launched a campaign against Umar's brother Abu Bakr, successfully raiding his baggage train. In April 1406, they allied themselves with Rustam's brothers Pir Muhammad and Iskandar and launched a combined assault against Abu Bakr. However, the latter emerged victorious and pursued his relations, laying siege to Isfahan in June/July. Rustam, despite being in the city at the time, does not appear to have been involved in its defence, possibly due to being incapacitated as a result of illness. Instead, the resistance was led by one of the prince's close advisers, Qadi Ahmad Sa'idi, who managed to forestall Abu Bakr, resulting in the siege being abandoned.

In 1406/07, Rustam gave refuge to a fugitive Iskandar, who had recently escaped incarceration by Pir Muhammad. Pir Muhammad attacked Isfahan, though upon failing to capture it, ravaged the surrounding lands by destroying crops, burning houses and breaking dams. In retribution for this assault, Rustam and Iskandar laid siege to Pir Muhammad's capital of Shiraz, though they were similarly unsuccessful. Instead, they resolved to plunder eastern Fars, from Niriz to Darabjirdb, an act in which they were aided by some of their brother's renegade followers, including several governors. Angered, Pir Muhammad pursued the two princes, with the goal of launching another assault on Isfahan. However, Rustam and Iskandar had previously been forced to leave the city due to a plague epidemic. The two armies instead met near the meadow of Gandoman and in the ensuing battle, Rustam and Iskandar were defeated. The two fled east, with Rustam seeking refuge with Shah Rukh in Herat.

== Later life and death ==
By 1412, Pir Muhammad had died and much of his former lands were now under the control of Iskandar. Rustam was invited to retake Isfahan by Qadi Ahmad Sa'idi, who had been governing the city for some years. However, as a result of intrigues among his amirs, Rustam was soon convinced to have Sa'idi killed. The latter, along with his son, was invited to a feast celebrating Eid al-Adha, where both were assassinated. The city's population was angered by the murder and swiftly turned against the prince, inviting Iskandar to take control of the city. Though Rustam attempted to fight his brother, without the city's support he was unable to resist and was forced to flee once more. He first headed to Tabriz to seek the aid of Qara Yusuf of the Qara Qoyunlu, though when this proved fruitless, he again returned to Shah Rukh in Herat.

When Shah Rukh marched against Iskandar in 1414/15 after the latter revolted, Rustam and their other brother Bayqara accompanied their uncle in his baggage train. Upon Iskandar's defeat, control of Isfahan was returned to Rustam, as well as custody of his renegade brother, whom he subsequently had blinded. Rustam, more cautious than his brothers, proved himself to be faithful to Shah Rukh. When Iskandar once more rose in rebellion, now alongside Bayqara, in 1415, Rustam aided in its suppression by having the former executed. Later, he led his troops into modern-day Azerbaijan in support of his uncle against Qara Yusuf's son Jahan Shah.

Rustam died in 1424/25 and was followed in quick succession by two sons. However, Firuz Shah, Shah Rukh's supreme army commander, later had Rustam's followers expelled and instead transferred the rule of Isfahan to his own brother.

== Family ==
=== Wives and concubines ===
- Makhdum Sultan: daughter of his cousin Pir Muhammad, later remarried to Rustam's brother Sayyid Ahmad
- Sa'adat Sultan: daughter of Ghiyas ud-din Tarkhan
- Dilshad Qipchaq
- Isan Mughal
- Bakht Sultan: daughter of Haji Khawaja Sirjaban

=== Issue ===
By Makhdum Sultan

- Pir Muhammad: married Khurshid Biki, his maternal cousin; had issue
- Sultan Jalal ud-din: married Bikijan Agha, a great-granddaughter of Rustam's brother Pir Muhammad; had issue

By Sa'adat Sultan

- Alim Shaikh
- Sultan Ali (c.1404 – 1423); had issue

By Dilshad Qipchaq

- Usman (c.1399 – 1424/25); had issue
- Ja'far

By Isan Mughal

- Muhammad Qachulay
- Suyurghatmish

By Bakht Sultan

- Muhammad Sultan
