= Umar Shaikh Mirza I =

Timurid prince (1356–1394)

- Timurid Prince; Umar Shaikh
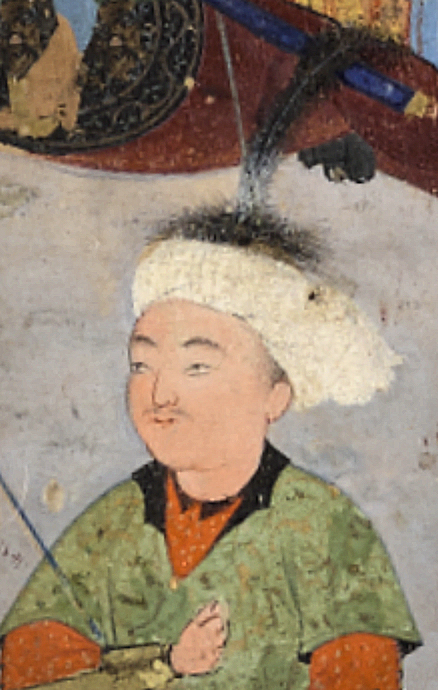
- Portrait of Umar Shaykh in the Siege of Urgench (1379). Garrett Zafarnama, painted in 1480.
- Born: 1356
- Died: February 1394 (aged 37–38); Kharmatu Fortress (present-day Iraq)
- Burial: Tomb of Jahangir, Shakhrisabz (present-day Uzbekistan)
- Issue more...: Pir Muhammad; Rustam; Iskandar; Bayqara
Names
- Mu'iz-ud-din Umar Shaikh Mirza
- House: Timurid dynasty
- Father: Timur
- Mother: Tolun Agha
- Religion: Islam

Mu'iz-ud-din Umar Shaikh Mirza (Persian: عمر شیخ میرزا; 1356 – February 1394) was a member of the Timurid dynasty and a son of its founder, the Central Asian conqueror Timur. Known for being a skilled soldier, Umar Shaikh was one of Timur's military commanders and also served as a regional governor. He died in 1394, predeceasing his father by over a decade.

He was afforded the honorifics Ghiyas al-Din ('succour of the faith') and Shuja' al-Din ('brave one of the faith'), together with the kunya Abu Ahmad ('father of Ahmad'), taken from his son Ahmad.

== Birth and early career ==
Umar Shaikh Mirza was one of four sons of Timur who survived infancy. His mother, named as Tulun or Tumalun Agha, was a concubine (surriya). Woods places his birth in the period 754–756 AH/1353–1355 CE, which would make him between forty and forty-two years old at his death.

There is some disagreement regarding whether Umar Shaikh Mirza I or his brother Jahangir Mirza was the eldest of Timur's sons. The Mu'izz al-Ansab (The Glorifier of Genealogies), the most important source regarding the structure of the Timurid royal family during this period, is contradictory on this point. It states that Jahangir was the eldest, but the family of Umar Shaikh is presented first in the genealogy itself, implying that he was born first. Narrative sources, such as the Zafarnama by Nizam al-Din Shami, and Sharaf al-Din Ali Yazdi's book of the same name support the notion that Umar Shaikh was older.

Umar Shaikh proved himself an accomplished warrior and a skilled horseman, taking part in many of his father's campaigns. In 1376, Timur appointed him governor of Fergana.

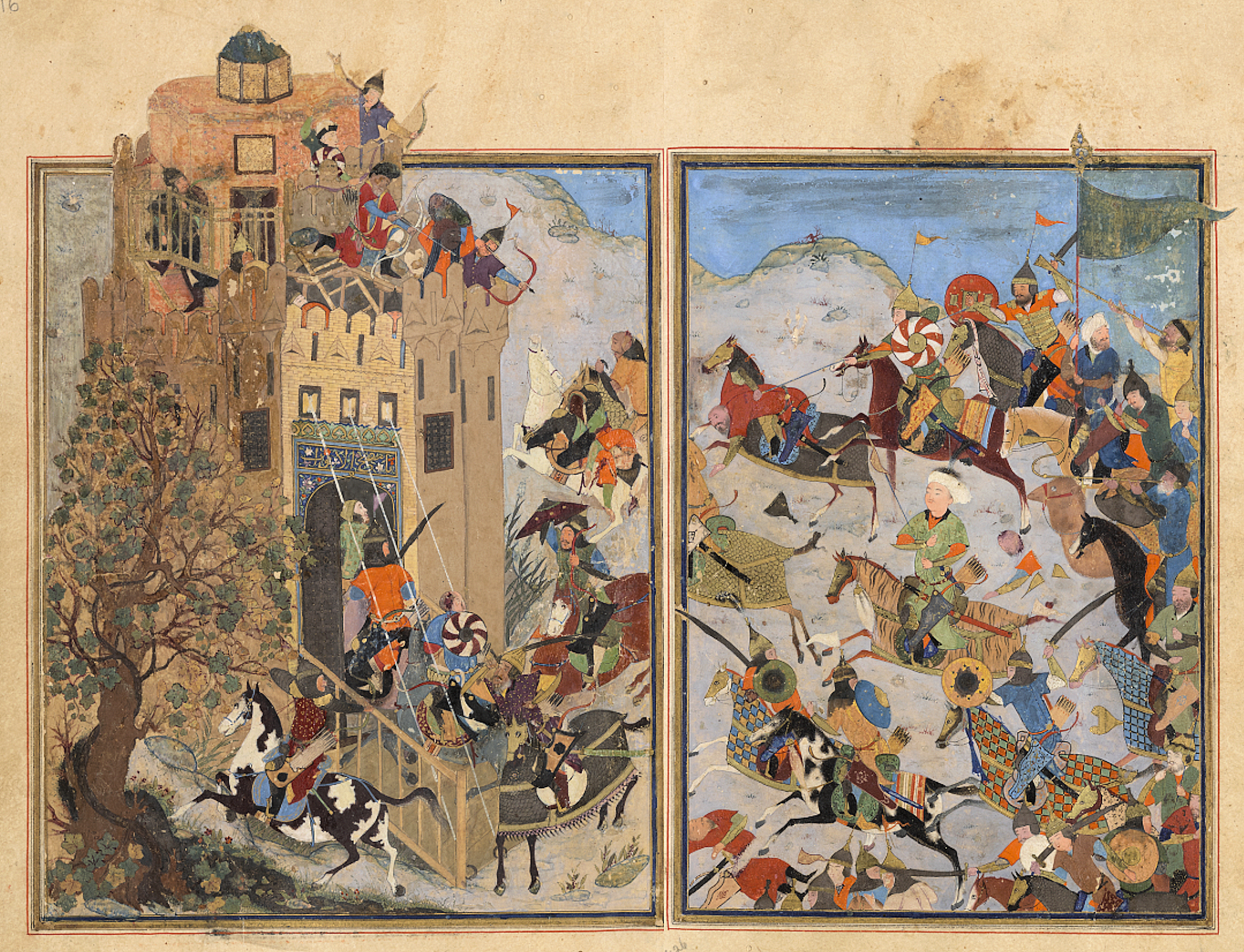
Timur's army, commanded by Umar Shaykh, in the Siege of Urgench (1379). Garrett Zafarnama, painted in 1480.

== War against Tokhtamysh ==
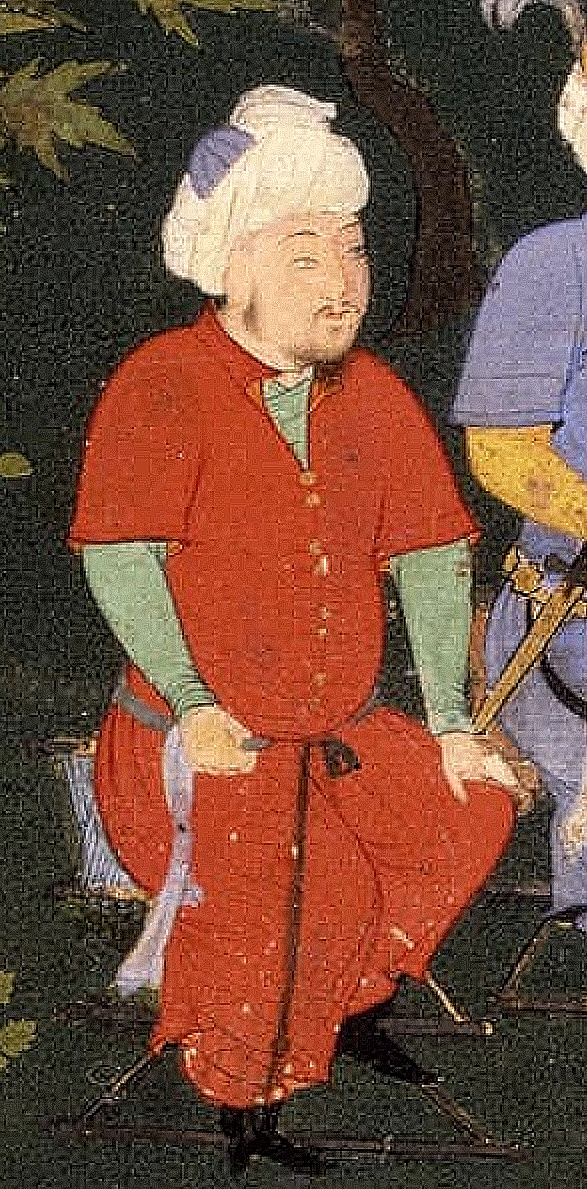
Umar Shaykh in the Garrett Zafarnama (1480s).

In 1388, war broke out between Timur and his former mentee, the Khan of the Golden Horde, Tokhtamysh. By this point, Tokhtamysh and Timur had already engaged each other several times.

Timur's lands were attacked on two fronts; Tokhtamysh launched his assault from Bukhara while his ally Qamar-ud-din Dughlat did so from Ferghana. At the same time, a rebellion erupted in the province of Khwarazm. Umar Shaikh was sent against Dughlat, while Timur himself marched towards Tokhtamysh. Dughlat was quickly defeated by the prince, prompting Tokhtamysh to flee from Timur's advance. Timur at this point diverted his attention to Khwarezm and brutally suppressed the rebellion, resulting in the devastation of the region.

Tokhtamysh once more attempted to attack in the winter of that year but was again defeated, this time by Umar Shaikh. Timur chased the Khan out of his lands and in 1391 launched a counteroffensive against him. This culminated in the Battle of the Kondurcha River, which took place in the Golden Horde territory of Volga. Umar Shaikh led the left wing of the army, his brother Miran Shah the right, their nephew Muhammad Sultan the centre and Timur himself the rear. While initially indecisive, the battle seemed to turn in the Khan's favour when Umar Shaikh's contingent was detached from the main army and nearly overwhelmed. However, this was averted when Tokhtamysh himself was forced to abandon the field while under attack by Timur, leading to confusion and panic among his troops. The Golden Horde's army was routed and forced to flee, the soldiers being chased and cut down by the Timurids. The death toll of the battle was estimated to have been 100,000 men and women.

== Death ==
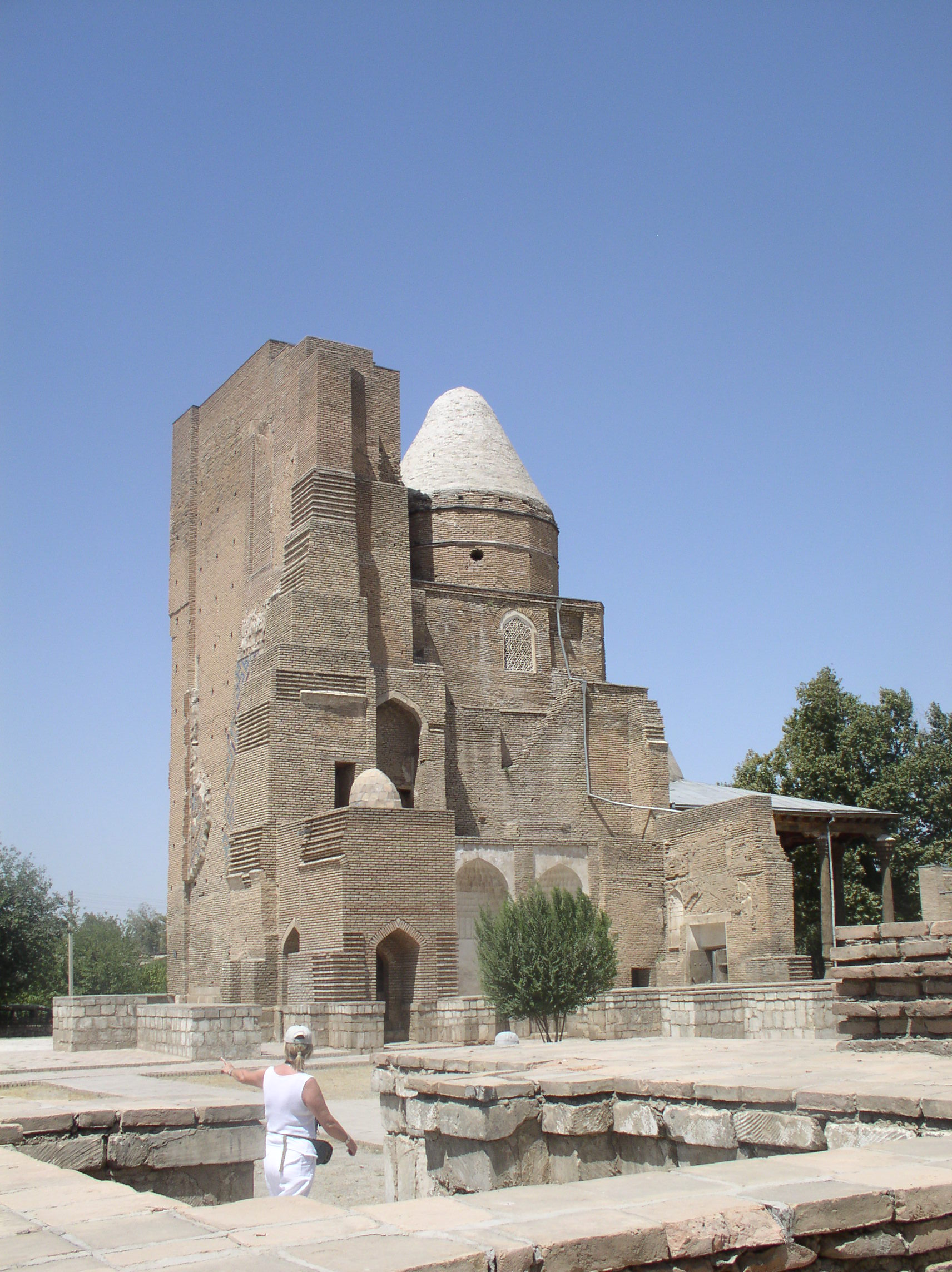
The Tomb of Jahangir in Shakhrisabz, Uzbekistan

In 1393, Timur defeated the Persian Muzaffarid dynasty with the capture and execution of its final monarch, Shah Mansur. Timur bestowed the kingdom's former territory of Fars on Umar Shaikh to administer as governor. The prince's earlier post of Ferghana was given to his son Iskandar Mirza.

However, Umar Shaikh was not able to hold this position for long. In 1394, whilst answering summons from his father, Umar Shaikh was killed after being shot in the neck by an arrow fired from the Tuz Khurmatu fortress, near the city of Baghdad. Woods dates the death to Rabi' I 796, corresponding to January 1394. Timur reportedly did not show any emotion upon learning of his son's death.

Umar Shaikh's governorship was given to his eldest son Pir Muhammad, while his body was escorted by his wives and his younger son Iskandar to the city of Kesh (modern day Shahrisabz). Here, he was buried alongside his brother in the Tomb of Jahangir, part of the Dorussaodat mausoleum complex. Presently, the tomb is the best surviving part of the structure.

== Wives and concubines ==
Twelve consorts are recorded, several of whom were remarried to other members of the dynasty after Umar Shaikh's death. Dates are given in the Hijri/Common Era form.

- Malikat Agha: daughter of the Chagatai prince Khizr Oghlan. Remarried to Umar Shaikh's brother Shah Rukh after 796/1394.
- Qutlugh Tarkan Agha Mughul.
- Sultan Agha: daughter of Amir Haji Beg Mughul. Remarried to Mizrab Barlas after 796/1394, and afterwards to Alika Kukaltash after 817/1414.
- Beg Malik Agha: daughter of Khwaja Yusuf ibn Uljaytu Apardi. Remarried to Umar Shaikh's nephew Pir Muhammad after 796/1394.
- Bakht Sultan Agha: daughter of Yasavur Jalayir. Remarried to Pir Muhammad ibn Jahangir after 796/1394.
- Tughluq Sultan Jalayir: a concubine (quma). Remarried to Pir Muhammad ibn Jahangir after 796/1394.
- Mihr Khush.
- Qutlugh Tarkan: a concubine (quma), distinct from the consort of the same name listed above.
- Takish Khatun: styled dukhtar-khana, indicating a woman of the khanal house.
- An unnamed daughter of Haji Beg Jauni Qurbani.
- Sivinch Qutlugh Agha Arlat: married 792/1390.
- An unnamed concubine (quma).

== Issue ==
Woods records that the maternity of several of these children is given differently in other sources; such variants are noted below.

By Malikat Agha

- Pir Muhammad: born c. 781/1379–80.
- Iskandar: born 786/1384.
- Ahmad, called "Amirak": born c. 789/1387.
- Bayqara, also recorded as Sultan Muhammad: born c. 796/1393–4. Elsewhere his mother is given as Sultan Bakht Agha.
- Isfandiyar: died aged two.

By Qutlugh Tarkan Agha Mughul

- Rustam: born 783/1381. He later married Makhdum Sultan, the widow of his half-brother Sayyidi Ahmad.

By Sultan Agha

- Muhammad.
- Nasab Sultan: a daughter.

By Beg Malik Agha

- Baba Biki: a daughter. Elsewhere her mother is given as Saray Malik Khanum.

By Bakht Sultan Agha

- Bistam: died in infancy. Elsewhere his mother is given as Durr Sultan Agha.
- Zubayda Sultan: a daughter, married to Yadgar Shah Arlat. Elsewhere her mother is given as Durr Sultan Agha, or possibly Saray Malik Khanum.

By Tughluq Sultan Jalayir

- Sayyidi Ahmad: born c. 789/1387, though the date is uncertain; died c. 809/1406–7, aged about twenty. He married Makhdum Sultan in 807/1404. Elsewhere his mother is given as Sivinch Qutlugh Agha.

By Mihr Khush

- Umar: elsewhere his mother is given as Qutlugh Tarkan Agha.
- Ali: died aged three. Elsewhere his mother is given as Saray Malik Khanum.
- Sa'adat Sultan: a daughter, married to Sultan Mahmud Khan, the Ögedeid khan of Timur's court and son of Suyurgatmish Khan.

By Qutlugh Tarkan

- Jahan Sultan Agha: a daughter, married to Hamza Barlas.

By Takish Khatun

- Dastan: died in infancy. Elsewhere his mother is given as (Madi) Qurnaqa, a wife of Suyurgatmish Khan.

By an unnamed concubine

- Zaynab Beki: a daughter, died in infancy.

By unknown mothers

- Fatima Sultan Beki: a daughter.
- Sultan Beki: a daughter.

== Bibliography ==
- Barzegar, Karim Najafi (2000), Mughal-Iranian relations: during sixteenth century, Indian Bibliographies Bureau, ISBN 978-81-85004-60-0
- Brend, Barbara (2013), Perspectives on Persian Painting: Illustrations to Amir Khusrau's Khamsah, Routledge, ISBN 978-1-136-85411-8
- Bretschneider, E. (1888), Mediaeval Researches from Eastern Asiatic Sources: Notes en Chinese mediæval travellers to the west, vol. 2, London: Kegan Paul, Trench, Trübner
- Jackson, Peter (2023). From Genghis Khan to Tamerlane: The Reawakening of Mongol Asia. Yale University Press. ISBN 978-0-300-27504-9.
- Jamaluddin, Syed (1995), The state under Timur: a study in empire building, Har-Anand, ISBN 978-81-241-0258-9
- Karomatov, Ḣamidulla (2001), Amir Temur in world history, Shaq
- King, John S.; Noble, John; Humphreys, Andrew (1996), Central Asia.: Kasachstan, Usbekistan, Turkmenien, Kirgisien, Tadschikistan., Lonely Planet Publications, ISBN 978-0-86442-358-0
- Marozzi, Justin (2012), Tamerlane: Sword of Islam, Conqueror of the World, HarperCollins Publishers, ISBN 978-0-00-736973-7
- Woods, John E. (1990), The Timurid dynasty, Indiana University, Research Institute for Inner Asian Studies
- Woods, John E. (2026), Woods, John E.; Binbaş, İlker Evrim (eds.), The Timurid Dynasty: A Handbook, Volume I: Timur and His Family, Handbook of Oriental Studies, Section 8: Uralic & Central Asian Studies, vol. 34, Leiden and Boston: Brill, doi:10.1163/9789004743984, ISBN 978-90-04-74398-4
