= Bayqara Mirza I =

Timurid prince

- Timurid Prince
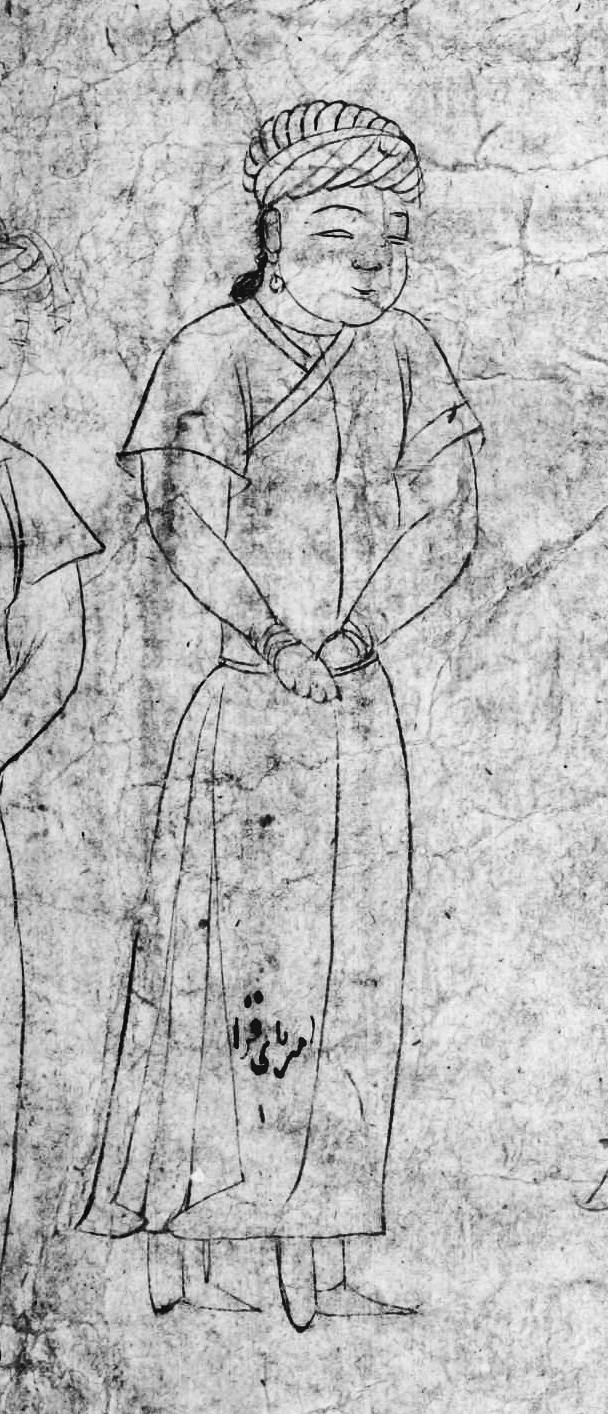
- Contemporary portrait of Amir Bayqara in 1405-1406 (age 14). Ms. Diez A. fol.74
- Born: 1392
- Died: 1422 (aged 29–30)
- Issue: Mansur Mirza; See below
- Dynasty: House of Timur
- Father: Umar Shaikh Mirza I
- Mother: Malikat Agha
- Religion: Islam

Bayqara Mirza I (1392 – 1422?) was a Timurid prince and a grandson of the Central Asian conqueror Timur by his eldest son Umar Shaikh Mirza I.

Described by the biographer Dawlatshah as "the noblest, fairest, and bravest of Timur’s descendants", Bayqara Mirza is best known for his rebellions against his uncle/stepfather Shah Rukh. He also had an interest in the arts, a trait inherited by his famous grandson and partial namesake Sultan Husayn Bayqara of Herat.

== Background ==
Bayqara Mirza was born c.1392 and was the youngest son of Umar Shaikh Mirza I by his wife, the Mongol princess Malikat Agha. His father, the eldest of the four sons of Timur, died in 1394 when Bayqara was about two years old. His mother, a daughter of the Chagatai prince Khizr Ughlan, was subsequently remarried to Umar Shaikh's younger brother Shah Rukh.

== Rebellions ==
When Timur died in 1405, Bayqara and his brothers were duty-bound to support their stepfather's bid for the throne in the ensuing dynastic struggle. However, within a few years of the latter's victory, Bayqara's brother Iskandar Mirza revolted, proclaiming himself Sultan in Isfahan in 1412. Shah Rukh led an expedition against his stepson, with Bayqara and another brother, Rustam, in his baggage train. After a short siege, Iskandar was captured and blinded. His former lands were partitioned between his siblings, with Bayqara being given an area which included Hamadan, Nahavand and Kurdistan, as well as custody of his rebellious elder brother.

Bayqara Mirza himself launched two unsuccessful rebellions against Shah Rukh, the first being in Fars in 1414. The second was instigated when Sa'd-i Waqqas, son of Bayqara's late cousin Muhammad Sultan, defected to the Qara Qoyunlu in the spring of 1415. Taking advantage of the disturbance caused by this, Bayqara was persuaded by Iskandar to declare independence. The latter was soon apprehended and executed by Rustam, though Bayqara himself continued in his campaign. His forces, burgeoned by nobles who had been loyal to Iskandar, met those of Shah Rukh's son Ibrahim Sultan outside the city of Shiraz. Bayqara routed his cousin's army and was welcomed into the city, having enjoyed support among the populace.

In preparation for his stepfather's inevitable retaliation, the prince quickly organised paramilitary forces as well as an armed cavalry of five thousand. When the emperor's army arrived outside Shiraz, the inhabitants lost confidence and asked Bayqara to surrender in order to save the city from destruction, to which he relented in December 1415. Shah Rukh withdrew his forces, though several nobles loyal to his stepsons were executed. Bayqara himself was spared, though only through the intercession of his cousin and friend Baysunghur. Instead, he was exiled to Qandahar, to live under the surveillance of another relation, Qaidu son of Pir Muhammad.

== Later life ==
There is uncertainty regarding the events of the remainder of Bayqara's life. One version states that he joined Qaidu in starting another rebellion, while another narrates that he had rebelled against Qaidu. Both accounts conclude with Bayqara being captured by the emperor and being sent to Samarqand. Alternatively, the biographer Dawlatshah said that the prince went voluntarily to Shah Rukh's camp in 1416, from where he was dispatched to his cousin Ulugh Beg, who later had him poisoned. However, the historian Fasih states that a man thought to be Bayqara was caught by Shah Rukh's men in Khorasan in 1422. After being questioned about his identity, the man was executed, despite uncertainty about whether he really was the prince.

There are some thoughts that the confusion regarding Bayqara's death were a result of Shah Rukh's reluctance to receive blame for it from his wife, the prince's mother Malikat Agha, who had already lost two of her sons by that point. There are also suggestions of intrigue against Bayqara and his brothers by the emperor's chief consort Gawhar Shad.

== Family ==
=== Wives and concubines ===
- Biki Sultan: daughter of his uncle Miran Shah and a widow of his elder brother Iskandar;
- Qutlugh Tarkhan: a descendant of Eljigidey, Khan of the Chagatai Khanate
- Adil Sultan Agha Qaraunas: a widow of his elder brother Pir Muhammad;
- Afaq Agha
- Mihr Nush Agha
- Mihr Nigar Agha
- La'l Beh
- A daughter of Hamza Tarkhan

=== Issue ===
By Biki Sultan

- Sa'adat Sultan
- Fatima Sultan

By Qutlugh Tarkhan

- Mansur Mirza (d.1446)
  - Darvish Muhammad
  - Muhammad Badi
  - Muhammad Muzaffar
  - Shahrbanu
  - Mihr Nigar
  - Bayqara Mirza II (d.1487)
  - Aka Biki
  - Badi al-Jamal
  - Sultan Husayn Bayqara Mirza (1438–1506)
  - Urun Sultan Khanum
- Muzaffar (d.1428/9)

By Adil Sultan Agha Qaraunas

- Muzaffar Mirza
- Maryam Sultan Bike

By Afaq Agha

- Muhammad Mirza
  - Sultan Uways (different from his cousin Sultan Uways Mirza).
  - Zubayda Sultan
  - Sa'adat Sultan

By Mihr Nush Agha

- Timur Beg

By Mihr Nigar Agha

- Ahmad Qara

By La'l Beg

- Sa'adat Sultan

By Hamza Tarkhan's daughter

- Khand-Sultan Biki
