= Pir Muhammad (son of Umar Shaikh) =

Timurid prince (c. 1379 – 1409)

- Timurid Prince
- Born: c. 1379
- Died: 18 May 1409 (aged 29–30)
- Issue: See below
Names
- Pir Muhammad Mirza
- Dynasty: House of Timur
- Father: Umar Shaikh Mirza I
- Mother: Malikat Agha
- Religion: Islam

Pir Muhammad Mirza (c. 1379 – 8 May 1409) was a Timurid prince and a grandson of the Central Asian conqueror Timur by his eldest son Umar Shaikh Mirza I.

Following his father's death in 1394, Pir Muhammad was appointed to succeed him as governor of Fars. Unlike many of his relatives, Pir Muhammad did not assert a claim to the throne in the aftermath of Timur's death in 1405. Instead, he consolidated and maintained the position that he had been granted by his grandfather. He was assassinated by his own soldiers while campaigning in 1409.

== Early life and background ==
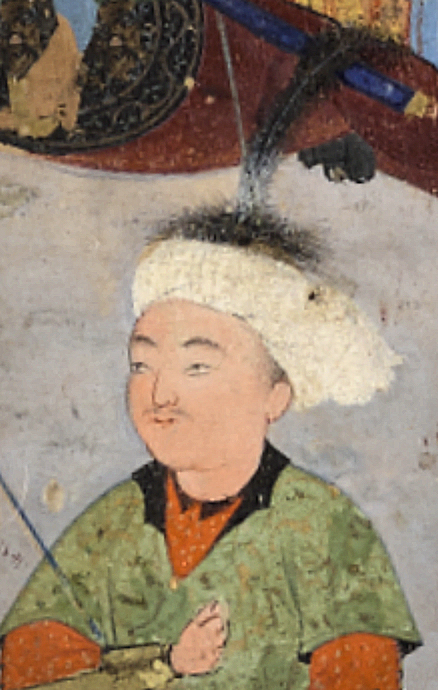
Portrait of Umar Shaikh Mirza I, father of Pir Muhammad, leading the attack on Urgench in 1379. Garrett Zafarnama, painted in 1480

Pir Muhammad was born c. 1379 and was the eldest son of Umar Shaikh Mirza I by his wife Malikat Agha. His father, the eldest of the four sons of Timur, died in 1394 when Pir Muhammad was about fifteen years old. His mother, a daughter of the Chagatai prince Khizr Ughlan, was subsequently remarried to Umar Shaikh's younger brother Shah Rukh.

Following his father's death, Pir Muhammad was appointed to his former post as governor of Fars, which had been conquered from the Persian Muzaffarid dynasty by Timur a few years earlier. However, Pir Muhammad appears to have earned his grandfather's ire during this time, being punished twice by Timur for suspected misbehaviours. It is perhaps due to these chastenings that the prince chose to adopt a relatively cautious position in the succession struggle following Timur's death.

== War of succession ==
Timur died in 1405, whilst leading his army east in a campaign against the Ming Dynasty of China. As he had no unambiguously appointed heir, a succession dispute erupted among his surviving sons and grandsons. Pir Muhammad and his younger brothers, Iskandar and Rustam, all held neighbouring governorships at this time. However, Pir Muhammad, twenty-five years old and long established in his position, was the most powerful among his siblings. Several regional cities, such as Yazd and Abarkuh, quickly declared their support for the prince and some of his advisers urged him to seek the endorsement of the Abbasid Caliph in Egypt. However, Pir Muhammad instead opted to declare his support for his uncle Shah Rukh. Given that the latter was also their step-father, Pir Muhammad saw that he and his brothers were duty-bound in providing their loyalty. (Note: The fact that he was married to a sister of Gawhar Shad, Shah Rukh's chief wife, may have predisposed Pir Muhammad towards this alliance.) However, this vassalship appears to have been in name only, as Pir Muhammad effectively acted as an independent monarch within his domains.

The young prince began gathering the troops scattered throughout the region. However, he was soon drawn into infighting with his brothers. Iskandar, unsatisfied with his governorship of Yazd which had been bestowed on him by Pir Muhammad, launched an invasion on Kerman in 1406/07. Pir Muhammad grew alarmed by this and captured Iskandar and seized his territories, though the latter quickly absconded to their brother Rustam in Isfahan. Pir Muhammad launched an assault on the city and upon failing to capture it, ravaged the surrounding countryside. Rustam and Iskandar launched a retaliatory attack against Pir Muhammad's capital of Shiraz, though this was similarly in vain. Rustam instead turned his attention to the eastern regions of Fars and began to plunder them, his forces bolstered by local rulers who had abandoned his brother. In vengeance for this, in 1407/08, Pir Muhammad led his army in an attack against his brothers' troops. The two forces met near the meadow of Gandoman, where Pir Muhammad ultimately prevailed. Though both Iskandar and Rustam had fled, Pir Muhammad was able to win the support of much of Rustam's army by declaring an amnesty. Through a combination of favour and force, he took control of his brother's former territory before proceeding to Isfahan. The city offered no resistance to the conquering army, in response to which the prince rewarded the population by giving a tax relief. He subsequently named his son Umar Shaikh the new governor of the region.

== Death and aftermath ==
In the absence of his rivals, Pir Muhammad was able to consolidate his power in the region. He eventually reconciled with Iskandar, who agreed to assume a subordinate position, later accompanying him on an expedition against Kirman. However, during this campaign, on the night of 18 May 1409, Pir Muhammad was murdered in his tent by a group of common soldiers. The prince's body was looted of its clothes and left naked. The instigator of the attack was Husayn Sharbatdar, a former pharmacist from the Shiraz bazar whom Pir Muhammad had favoured and raised to the rank of amir. He and the other assailants had also attempted to hunt down and kill Iskandar, but ultimately failed to locate him. Gathering his allied amirs, Sharbatdar then marched his troops out towards Shiraz.

Iskandar, who had been in his brother's camp, was said to have been so distressed upon learning of Pir Muhammad's murder that he was unable to dress himself. Wearing only his shirt, a cap and a single boot, the prince mounted his horse and fled to Shiraz, where the city leaders swore allegiance to him. When Sharbatdar's forces arrived at the city gates, they found them barred. As a result, the amir began to haemorrhage supporters and by noon of that day, only fifty riders remained, all of who were promptly captured. Iskandar made an example of the main perpetrators of Pir Muhammad's murder with exemplary punishments. Sharbatdar himself, having had his beard and eyebrows shaved, was dressed in women's clothing and displayed in public, before being dismembered; his head was kept in Shiraz while his hands and feet were each sent to a different city.

== Family ==
=== Wives and concubines ===
- Nigar Agha: daughter of Ghiyas ud-din Tarkhan
- Adil Sultan Agha Qaraunas: later remarried to his brother Bayqara
- Shirin Malik

=== Issue ===
By Nigar Agha

- Darvish Muhammad
- Umar Shaikh (1398 – February 1429)
- Aylangir
- Salih
- Abu Ishaq

By Adil Sultan Agha Qaraunas

- Jan Qabul

By Shirin Malik

- Unnamed daughter

By unnamed mothers

- Buzanchar (d.1422)
- Maryam Sultan
