= Shah Rukh =

Ruler of the Timurid Empire from 1405 to 1447

- Sultan; Padishah; Bahadur
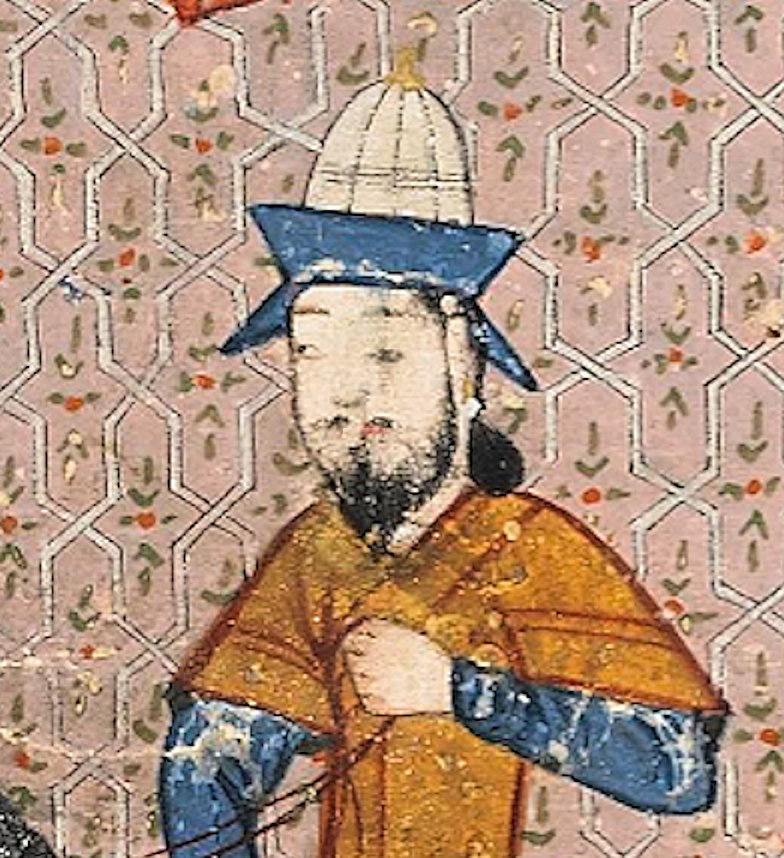
- Contemporary portrait of Shah Rukh, painted in his lifetime in 1435-36, by commission of his son Ibrahim Sultan.

Ruler of the Timurid Empire
- Reign: 20 February 1405 – 13 March 1447
- Predecessor: Timur
- Successor: Ulugh Beg
- Born: 20 August 1377; Samarkand, Timurid Empire
- Died: 13 March 1447 (aged 69); Ray, Timurid Empire
- Burial: Gur-e-Amir, Samarkand
- Spouse: Gawhar Shad; Malikat Agha
- Issue: Ulugh Beg; Sultan Ibrahim; Baysunghur; Soyurghatmish; Muhammad Juki; Several others
Names
- Sultan Mahmud Moin-ud-din Shah Rukh
- Dynasty: Timurid
- Father: Timur
- Mother: Saray Mulk Khanum or Taghay Tarkhan Agha
- Religion: Sunni Islam

Shah Rukh (Note: Alternatives: Shahrukh, Shahrokh or Shahruh) or Shahrukh Mirza (Uzbek: Shohrux, from Classical Persian: شاهرخ, romanized: Shāhrukh; (Note: Modern Iranian Persian: شاهرخ, romanized: Shâhrokh.) 20 August 1377 – 13 March 1447) was the ruler of the Timurid Empire between 1405 and 1447.

He was the son of the Central Asian conqueror Timur (Tamerlane), who founded the Timurid dynasty in 1370. However, Shah Rukh ruled only over the eastern portion of the empire established by his father, comprising most of Persia and Transoxiana, the western territories having been lost to invaders in the aftermath of Timur's death. In spite of this, Shah Rukh's empire remained a cohesive dominion of considerable extent throughout his reign, as well as a dominant power in Asia.

Shah Rukh controlled the main trade routes between Asia and Europe, including the legendary Silk Road, and became immensely wealthy as a result. He chose to have his capital not in Samarqand as his father had done, but in Herat. This was to become the political centre of the Timurid empire and residence of his principal successors, though both cities benefited from the wealth and privilege of Shah Rukh's court.

Shah Rukh was a great patron of the arts and sciences, which flourished under his rule. He spent his reign focusing on the stability of his lands, as well as maintaining political and economic relations with neighbouring kingdoms. In the view of historians Thomas W. Lentz and Glenn D. Lowry, "unlike his father, Shahrukh ruled the Timurid empire, not as a Turco-Mongol warlord-conqueror, but as an Islamic sultan. In dynastic chronicles he is exalted as a man of great piety, diplomacy, and modesty—a model Islamic ruler who repaired much of the physical and psychological damage caused by his father."

== Early life ==
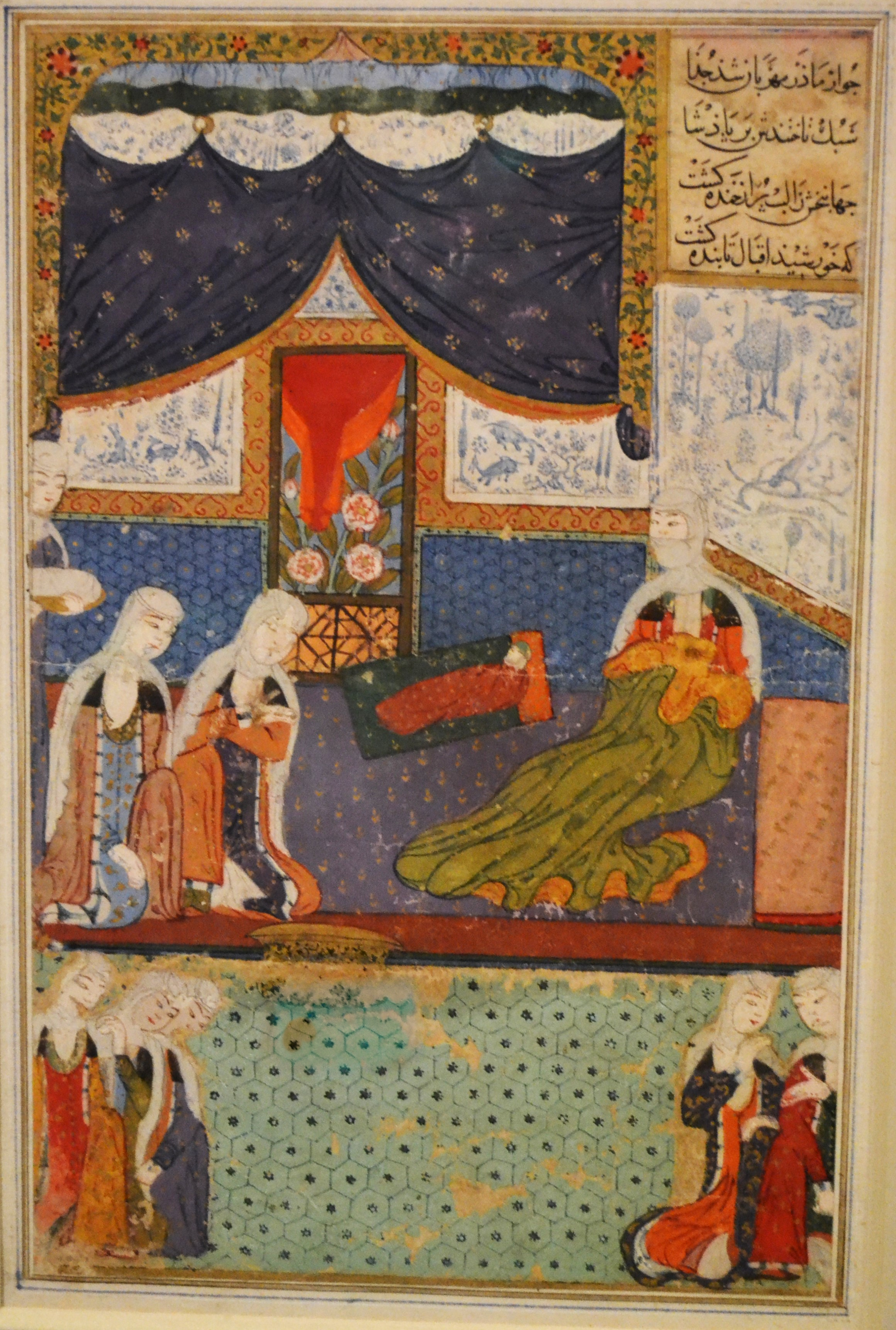
The Birth of Shah Rukh in Samarkand on 20 August 1377. Zafarnama of 1436, folio 148r.

Shah Rukh was born on 20 August 1377, the youngest of Timur's four sons. In Persian, his name's elements have multiple meanings: شاه shah means "a king, a sovereign. [specifically], shah, title of the ruler of Persia", "the king" in chess, "used as a prefix meaning 'the best, greatest, main', etc. Ex. شاهکار shahkar, masterpiece" or "a bridegroom" (synonymous with داماد dâmâd); رخ rokh means "the face or figure; also, the cheek; the countenance", "the castle or rook" in chess; and the roc, "a fabulous bird; perhaps the condor". This is also the Persian term for the chess move "castling". According to Ibn 'Arabshah, Timur, who was a talented chess player, was involved in a match when he received the news of Shah Rukh's birth, using this chess move as a name for the newborn child.

Some sources suggest that his mother was the Empress Saray Mulk Khanum, formerly a Chaghatai princess and Timur's chief consort; she had been captured by Timur from the harem of Amir Husayn Qara'unas several years prior to Shah Rukh's birth. However, it was stated by the 15th-century historian Khwandamir that Shah Rukh's mother was a certain Taghay Tarkhan Agha of the Qara Khitai. Khwandamir used a genealogical record written during Shah Rukh's reign as his source for this assertion. Regardless of his maternal origins, the prince was personally raised by Saray Mulk, alongside Timur's grandson Khalil Sultan.

=== Campaign in Iran (1392-1397) ===
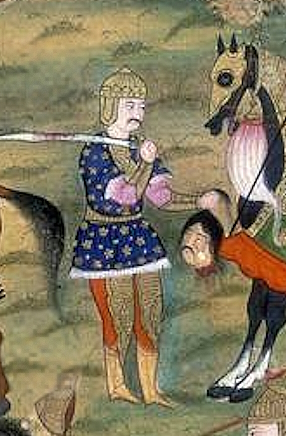
Shah Rukh presenting the head of Shah Mansur to Timur in the Battle of Shiraz (1393). Tarikh e Khandan e Timuriyah (1577–78).

Shah Rukh appears to have participated to the Iranian campaigns of Timur when in returned from Transoxonia in 1392. The campaign was to last five years, by Timur started by fighting the Muzaffarids ruler Shah Mansur, who was defying him from his base in Shiraz. Shah Mansur fought the Timurid forces, but was defeated and decapitated by the forces of prince Shah Rukh. A miniature from the Timurid Zafarnama (Zafarnama (1435–36, Shiraz)) showed Shah-Rukh, at seventeen years of age, vanquishing Shah Mansur in the Battle of Shiraz (1393), but this miniature has been lost, without a remaining image. The event also appears in the later Mughal account of the Timurid campaigns Tarikh e Khandan e Timuriyah.

=== Governor of Khorasan (1397) ===
Timur appears not to have had particularly close relations with Shah Rukh, despite the latter never having incurred his displeasure. In 1397, Shah Rukh was appointed governor of Khorasan by his father, with his viceregal capital being Herat. Although this was a significant region, it was also the same post that had been awarded to Shah Rukh's brother Miran Shah when the latter had been thirteen years old. Shah Rukh was never promoted beyond this position during his father's lifetime. Further to this, during Timur's campaign to China, Shah Rukh's young sons took pride of place in the procession while he himself was passed over.

Historical sources give no explanation for their relationship, though there is some evidence which suggests that it was Shah Rukh's ancestry which had affected Timur's lack of favour, being the son of a concubine as opposed to a freeborn wife. Alternatively, there have been suggestions that Timur believed Shah Rukh did not possess the personal qualities required for ruling; the prince by this point had acquired a reputation for excessive modesty as well as personal piety. It might also have been this Islamic adherence and subsequent rejection of the laws of Genghis Khan, which had always been so strongly revered by Timur, that had resulted in the alienation of Shah Rukh from his father.

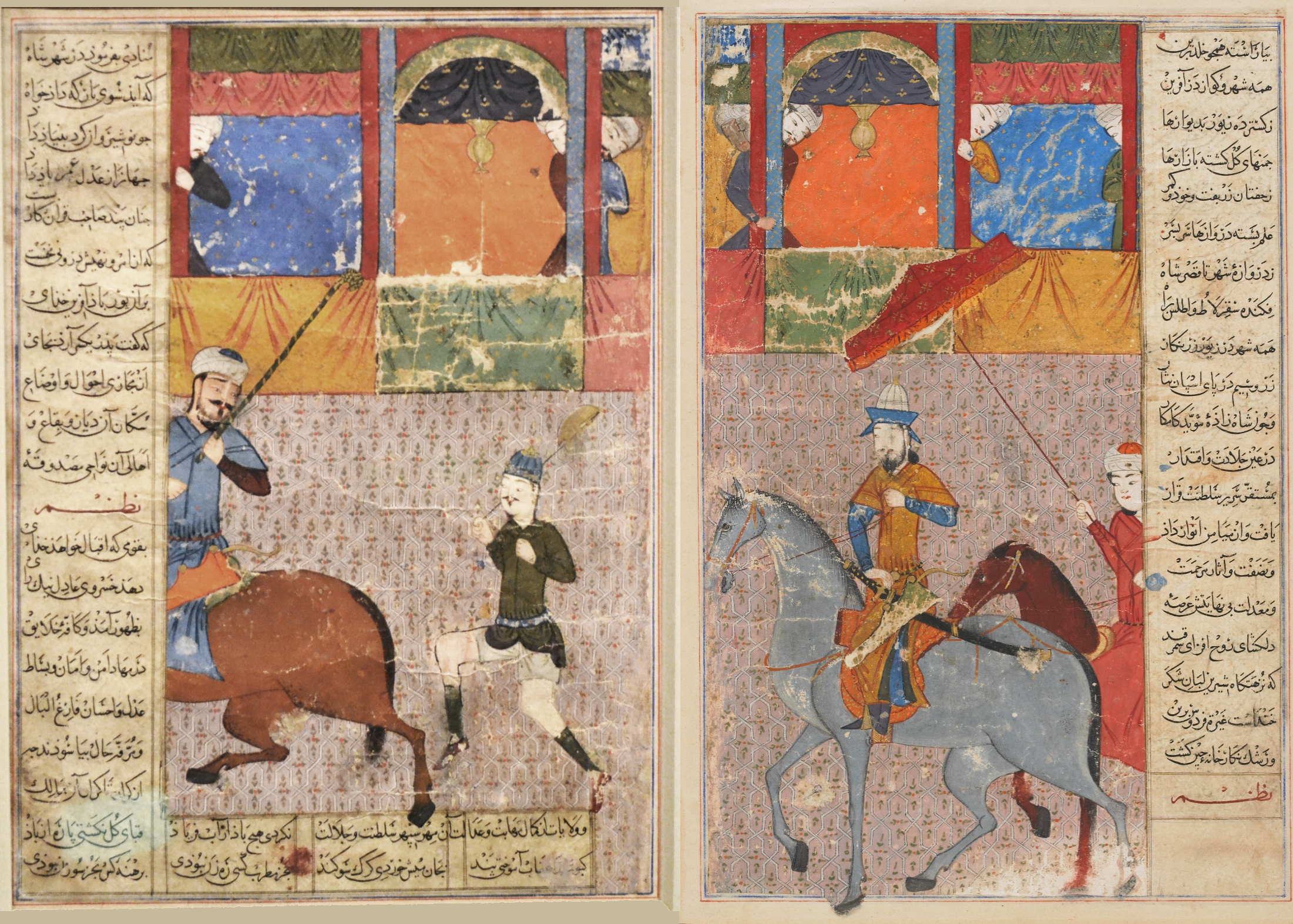
Shah Rukh on horse (right) is depicted making a triumphal entrance in Samarkand in 1394, after Timur named him Governor of the city. He is preceded by a customary payk groom running on foot. Contemporary miniature, commissioned by Shah Rukh's son Ibrahim Sultan in his Zafarnama of 1436.

Shah Rukh, alongside most of the royal family, accompanied Timur west in his campaign against the Ottoman Empire, which culminated in the Battle of Ankara in 1402. Shah Rukh commanded the left wing of the army, Miran Shah the right and Timur himself in the centre. The vanguard was headed by two of Shah Rukh's nephews. The battle resulted in a Timurid victory, as well as the capture and subjugation of the Ottoman Sultan, Bayezid I.

== War of succession ==
Timur died in 1405, whilst leading his army east in a campaign against the Ming Dynasty. He was reported to have said on his deathbed that he "had no other desire than to see the Mirza Shah Rukh once more" and had lamented the fact that he did not have time to do so.

Timur had no unambiguously appointed heir at the time of his death; as a result, a succession dispute erupted among his surviving sons and grandsons. Khalil Sultan proclaimed himself emperor at Tashkent soon after his grandfather's death and seized the royal treasury, as well as Timur's imperial capital Samarqand. Shah Rukh marched his army out of Herat to the Oxus river but made no offensive move against his nephew at this point. This was likely due to Miran Shah, Khalil Sultan's father, who posed a serious threat as he, along with his other son Abu Bakr, had led an army out of Azerbaijan in support of the younger prince. They were both forced to withdraw prior to joining with Khalil Sultan however, due to invasions to their rear by the Jalayirids and the Qara Qoyunlu, who took advantage of the death of the old emperor to seize territory. Miran Shah was killed in battle in 1408 whilst attempting to repel the invaders, with Abu Bakr dying similarly the year after.

In the years following Timur's death, Shah Rukh and Khalil Sultan had a series of unproductive negotiations as well as many military encounters, with Khalil Sultan frequently emerging victorious. During this time, other pretenders also pursued their own claims to the throne. Among these was Sultan Husayn Tayichiud, a maternal grandson of Timur who later aligned himself with Khalil Sultan, before betraying him in order to reassert his own claim. Sultan Husayn was defeated by his former ally and fled to Shah Rukh, who had him executed, with his body parts being displayed in the bazaars of Herat. Two more of Timur's grandsons, Iskandar and Pir Muhammad, also made bids for the throne. They were defeated by Shah Rukh and Khalil Sultan respectively, with each being spared by their subjugator. Pir Muhammad was later assassinated by one of his nobles in 1407, while Iskandar was executed in 1415 following a failed rebellion.

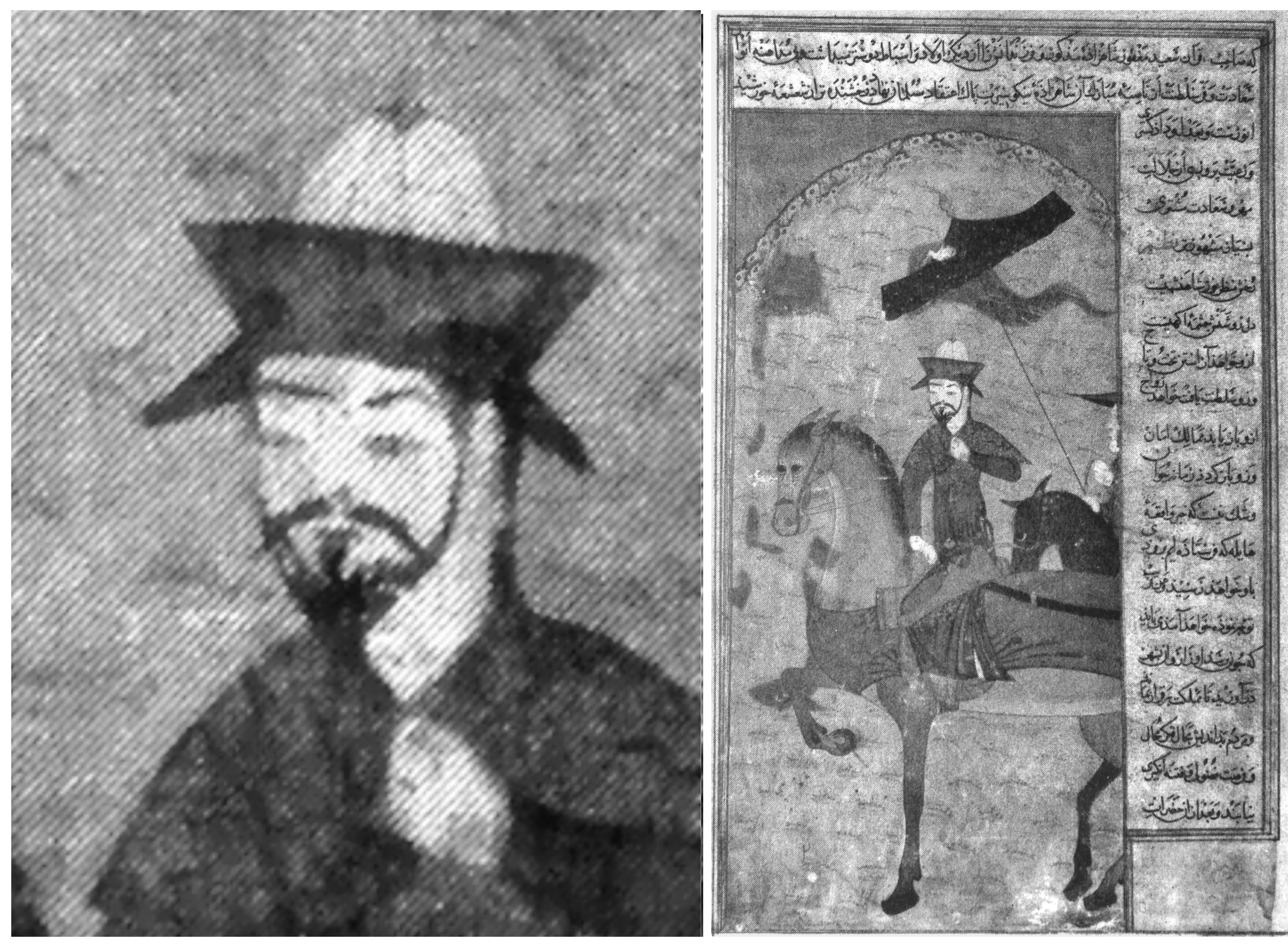
Contemporary portrait of Shah Rukh in the campaign against China in February 1405, after Timur's death. Zafarnama, Folio 413v (1436).

It was not until 1409 that the war started to turn in Shah Rukh's favour. During this time, Khalil Sultan began to lose support among his emirs in Samarqand. His wife Shadi Mulk had been given a large amount of authority in court. (Note: Khalil Sultan's marriage to Shadi Mulk several years earlier had caused a great scandal due to her being the widow of one of Timur's most powerful amirs.) Under her influence, low-ranking individuals were given high positions instead of Timur's old nobles. Additionally, several of the old emperor's widows and concubines were remarried (somewhat forcefully) to men of undistinguished backgrounds.

Following a famine which further spread discontent among the populace, Khalil Sultan was eventually taken captive by the powerful emir Khudaidad Hussain, leader of the Dughlat tribe and a former mentor of the prince. Hussain took Khalil Sultan to Ferghana and had him proclaimed ruler in Andijan. Samarqand, having been left abandoned, was taken unopposed by Shah Rukh. When he later captured Shadi Mulk, Khalil Sultan was forced to go to his uncle in Samarqand and submit to him. The prince had his wife returned to him and was appointed governor of Rayy, but died in 1411, with Shadi Mulk committing suicide soon after.

Following the deaths of Khalil Sultan, Sultan Husayn and Pir Muhammad, Shah Rukh had no immediate Timurid rivals to contest his rule and he began his reign as Timur's successor. However, rather than ruling from Samarqand as his father had done, Shah Rukh held court in Herat, which had formerly been his viceregal capital. Samarqand was instead bestowed on his eldest son Ulugh Beg, who was appointed governor of Transoxiana.

== Military campaigns ==
=== War with the Qara Qoyunlu ===
The new emperor began his reign by launching expeditions against regions which had begun to break away during the war of succession. Fars, which was held by Shah Rukh's nephew Bayqara, was taken in 1414. Two years later Kirman, which had been ruled as an independent kingdom by Sultan Uwais Barlas since 1408, was also subdued. The area under Shah Rukh's rule continued to be extended and consolidated over the following years, either through voluntary subjugation by minor rulers or through alliances. By 1420, the eastern portion of Timur's empire, as well as central and southern Persia, had been brought under Shah Rukh's rule.

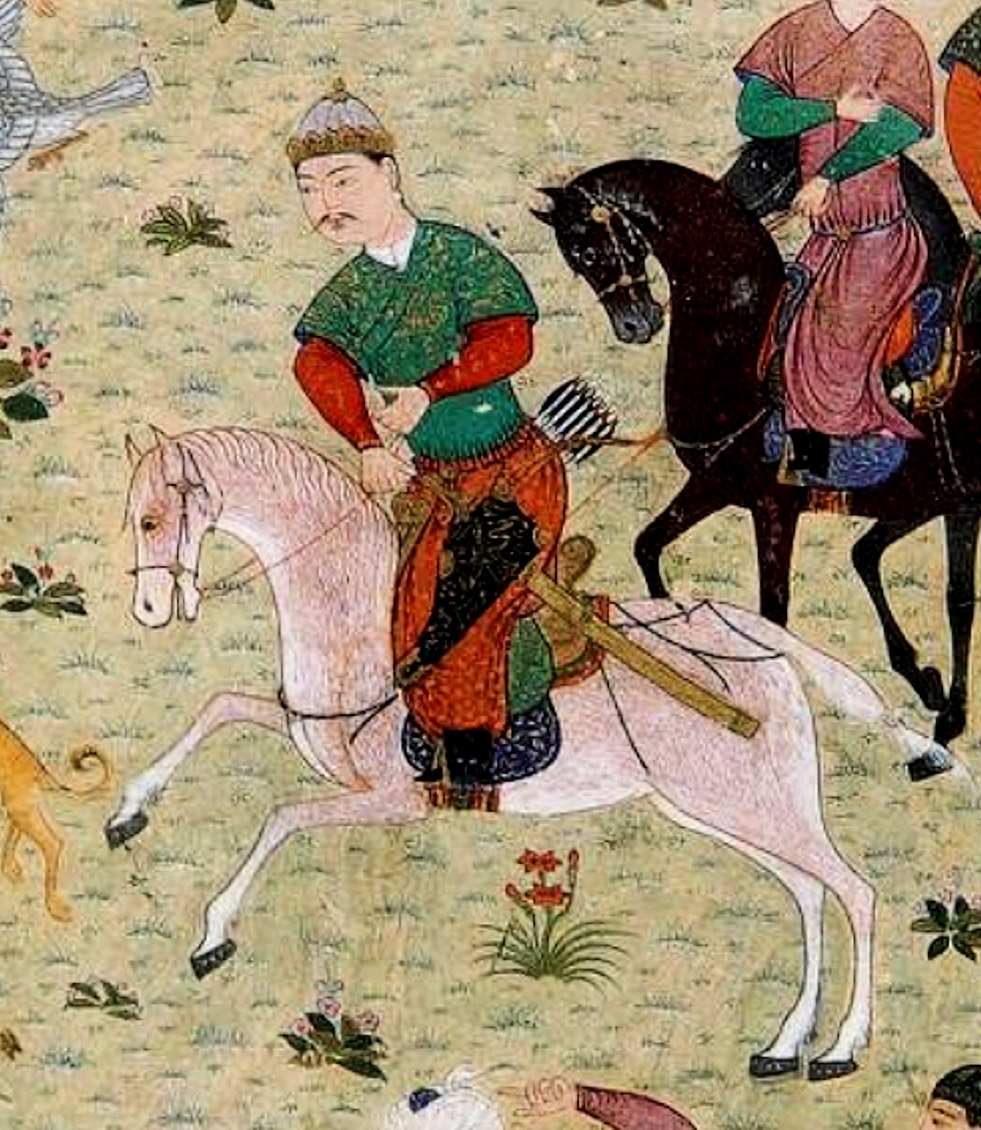
Baysunghur, son of Shah Rukh, participated to the campaign against the Qara Qoyunlu, and briefly occupied their capital Tabriz in 1421, bringing back artists for the Herat school of miniatures.

However, despite Shah Rukh's successes, the western portion of the empire, including Azerbaijan and Mesopotamia, remained out of his control. These were held by Qara Yusuf of the Qara Qoyunlu (Black Sheep Turkoman), who had defeated and killed Shah Rukh's brother Miran Shah several years previously. With the conquests of several prominent cities such as Baghdad, Qazvin and Diyarbakır, the Qara Qoyunlu had established themselves as dangerous neighbours to the Timurids. This threat was one which remained unresolved for decades. Shah Rukh made many attempts to pacify his western border, both through political and military means (having launched three campaigns against Azerbaijan), none of which proved entirely successful.

Qara Yusuf died during the first of the campaigns in November 1420, which ended in the Timurid capture of Azerbaijan and Armenia. However, less than a year later Shah Rukh was forced to face off a rebellion by the late Turkoman prince's sons. The Timurids under Shah Rukh defeated one of these sons of Qara Yusuf, Qara Iskander, at the Battle of Alashkert in 1421. They briefly occupied the Qara Qoyunlu capital of Tabriz in 1421, and Baysunghur, the son of Shah Rukh, brought back to Herat a group of Tabrizi artists and calligraphers, formerly working for Ahmad Jalayir, who he installed in Herat to add to his existing artists from Shiraz. They became the most important school of artists in Iran, merging the two styles.

One of these sons, Qara Iskander, continued his attempts to reassert Turkoman authority over the following years, necessitating the second campaign in 1429. This too resulted in a Timurid victory and the installation of a Qara Qoyunlu prince, Abu Said, as a puppet ruler. However, Qara Iskander reoccupied the city of Tabriz two years later and had Abu Said executed.

This action prompted the third and final campaign in 1434, in which Qara Iskander was once more forced to flee. He was later assassinated by his son Qubad in the fortress of Alinja. Although this campaign did not result in a final resolution of the Turkoman issue, it did achieve stability in the region for the remainder of Shah Rukh's reign with the installation of Qara Iskander's less bellicose brother Jahan Shah as the Turkoman ruler.

=== Conflict with Hurufis and anti-intellectual purges ===
The Hurufis were a Sufi sect who based their doctrine on the mysticism of letters. In the late 14th century, the group was accused of heresy by traditional Islamic scholars. As a result, in 1394 the founder of the movement, Fazlallah Astarabadi, had been arrested and executed on Timur's orders by his son Miran Shah. The death of their leader led Astarabadi's followers to have a specific hatred against the Timurids.

While leaving a mosque in 1426, Shah Rukh became the victim of an assassination attempt. The attacker, Ahmed Lur, approached the emperor under the pretence of presenting a petition, before stabbing him in the stomach. Lur however, failed to give a fatal blow and was quickly killed by Shah Rukh's servant. Shah Rukh recovered within a few days and an investigation was launched, which linked Lur to the Hurufis as well as to the family of Astarabadi.

There was an immediate backlash against the sect, which resulted in the execution of Astarabadi's grandson, Azud. High-ranking members of the group were subject to extensive interrogations. These eventually extended beyond the sect, with many intellectuals residing in Herat having to defend themselves against accusations of blasphemy. These included the Persian historian Sharaf-ud-din Ali Yazdi, author of the Zafarnama, and his teacher Sain-ud-din Turka. The prominent poet and Sufi, Qasem-e Anvar was expelled from the capital on Shah Rukh's orders. These accusations even went beyond Shah Rukh's court in Herat, with Ma'ruf-i Khattat, a prominent calligrapher under the patronage of Prince Baysunghur, also being arrested and interrogated.

The extent to which the Hurufis were involved in the assassination attempt has not yet been clearly established. However, the subsequent purges served to worsen the already strained relations between the Timurid court and the intellectuals of the empire.

=== Rebellions ===
In the early part of his reign, in what was likely an attempt to stave off rebellion amongst his relations, Shah Rukh regularly made transfers between the governorships they held. For example, Khalil Sultan was moved from Samarqand to Rayy, Umar Mirza from Azerbaijan to Astrabad, Iskandar Mirza from Ferghana to Hamadan to Shiraz etc.

These attempts did not prove to be entirely successful, as Shah Rukh had to repeatedly suppress rebellions by his various family members. Iskandar Mirza, after encouraging his brother to revolt in 1413, himself rebelled and devastated the cities of Isfahan and Kerman. Bayqara, after his initial defeat in Fars, rebelled once more soon after in Shiraz. These insurrections even continued into Shah Rukh's old age. In 1446, at nearly seventy years old, he had to march against his grandson Sultan Muhammad, who had revolted in the empire's western provinces.

== Administration ==
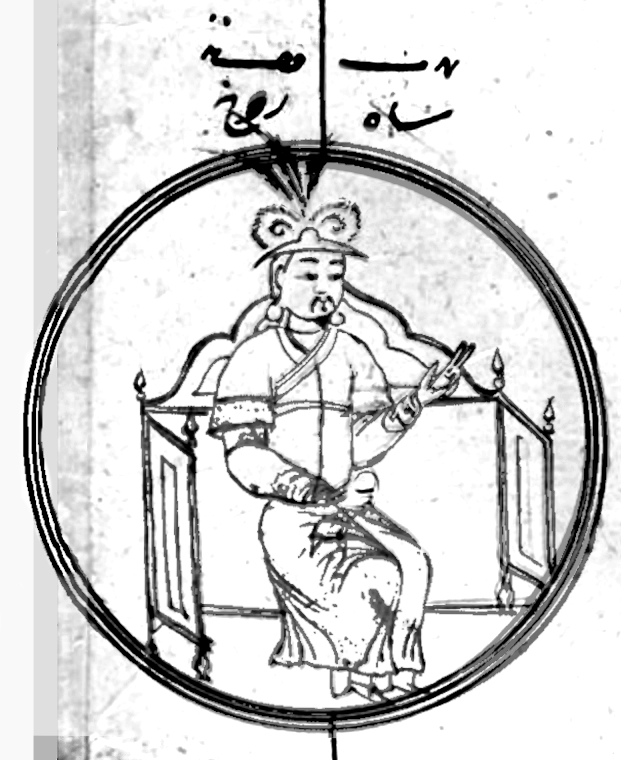
Contemporary depiction of Shah Rukh enthroned, in a Timurid genealogy created by his nephew Khalil Sultan in 1405-1406 (Topkapi Sarayi Müzesi, H.2152).

Shah Rukh's reign saw a marked improvement in economic standards and cultural achievements in many areas of the empire. Although this may partly be accredited to Shah Rukh's more diplomatic character in contrast to the ruthlessness of Timur, evidence does not assign Shah Rukh with superior skill as a statesman. It is instead believed that other influences on his government led to the relative success of his rule. These include his empress, Gawhar Shad, who along with her sons and some state officials, maintained orderly continuity of state affairs. Some of the highest state officials appear to have been unusually talented individuals who were able to endure in their positions for several decades. These include Jalal-ud-din Firuz Shah, who was supreme commander of the army for thirty-five years, Ghiyath al-Din Pir Ahmad Khvafi, supreme secretary for thirty-one years and Amir Alika Kokultash, head of state finance for forty-three years.

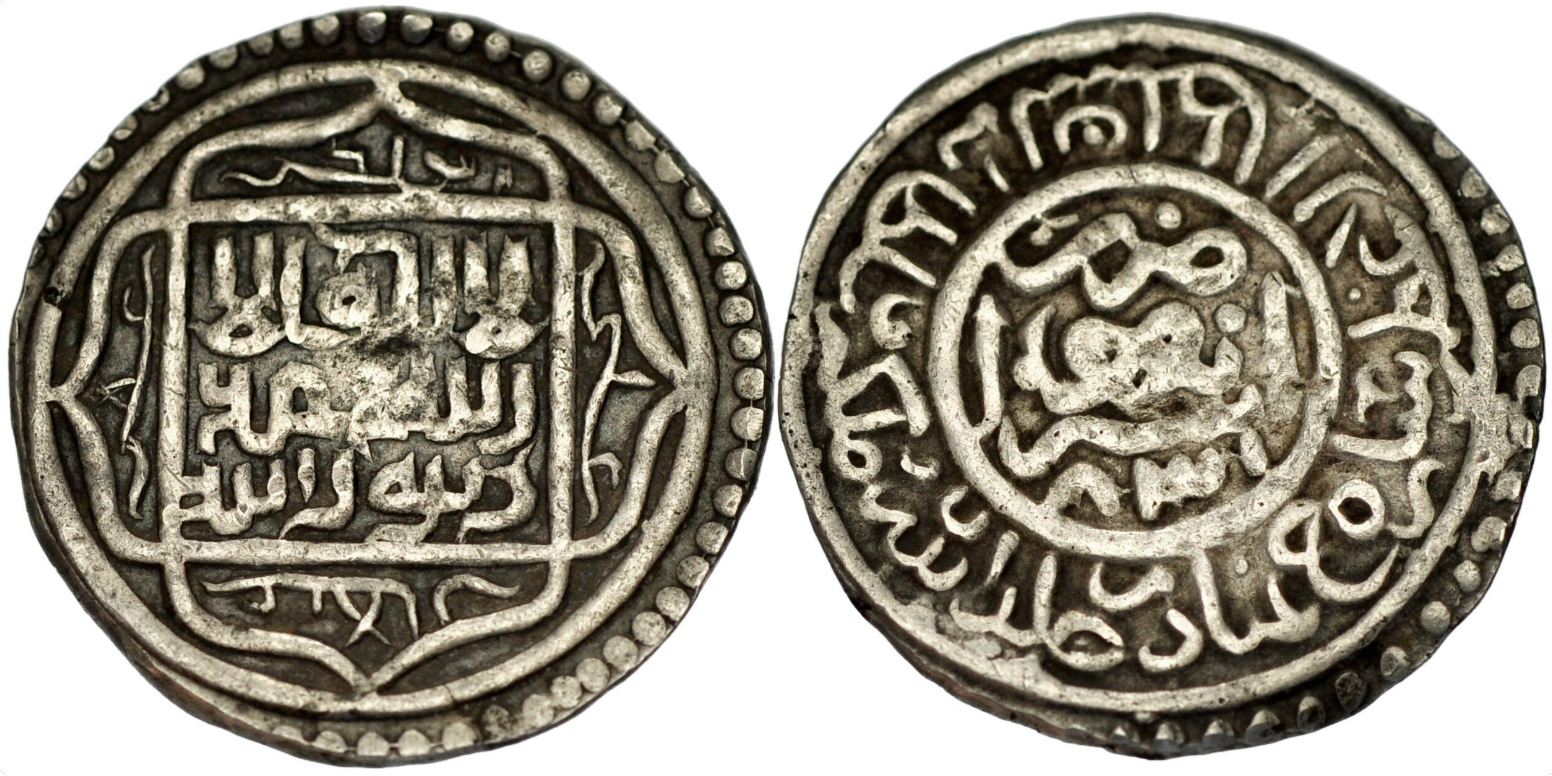
Coinage of Shah Rukh. Astarabad mint. Dated 1427-8 CE

In regards to his policies, Shah Rukh distanced himself from Timur, with less importance being placed on Mongol concepts of authority. He abandoned the institution of a figurehead Khan and replaced the Mongol tribunals with Sharia courts. Like his father, Shah Rukh was married to a Mongol princess, Malikat Agha, widow of his brother Umar Shaikh Mirza I. He did not however, claim the title of Küregen (son-in-law) which had been enjoyed by Timur. He similarly did not employ Timur's title of Amir, instead adopting the Islamic and Persian styles of Sultan and Padshah.

Shah Rukh's religious advisor Jalal-Din al-Qayini, described the abolishment of the Mongol tribunals in 1411: "His Majesty's correct thinking on the subject of giving currency to the Sharia and reviving the customs of the Sunna has progressed so far at this time that, in Dhul-Qada 813 (i.e., February–March 1411), he abolished the yarghu court of investigation and the customs of the törä which had been observed by Turko-Mongolian rulers since ancient times."

The Timurid author Sain ad-Din Ali Turka Isfahani praised Shah Rukh for ruling by Islamic Law in the following words: “Absolutely everyone with a legal case has it heard in accordance with the Sharia, and thanks to the felicity of the favour of this Faith-promoting padshah (i.e. Shah Rukh), not a trace has remained anywhere of the Yarghu Tribunal which (God preserve us!) had for a long time exercised its tyranny over the minds of rulers and polluted the lands of Islam, and no creature has the power [to conduct] this type of interrogation except in secret."

== Cultural influence ==
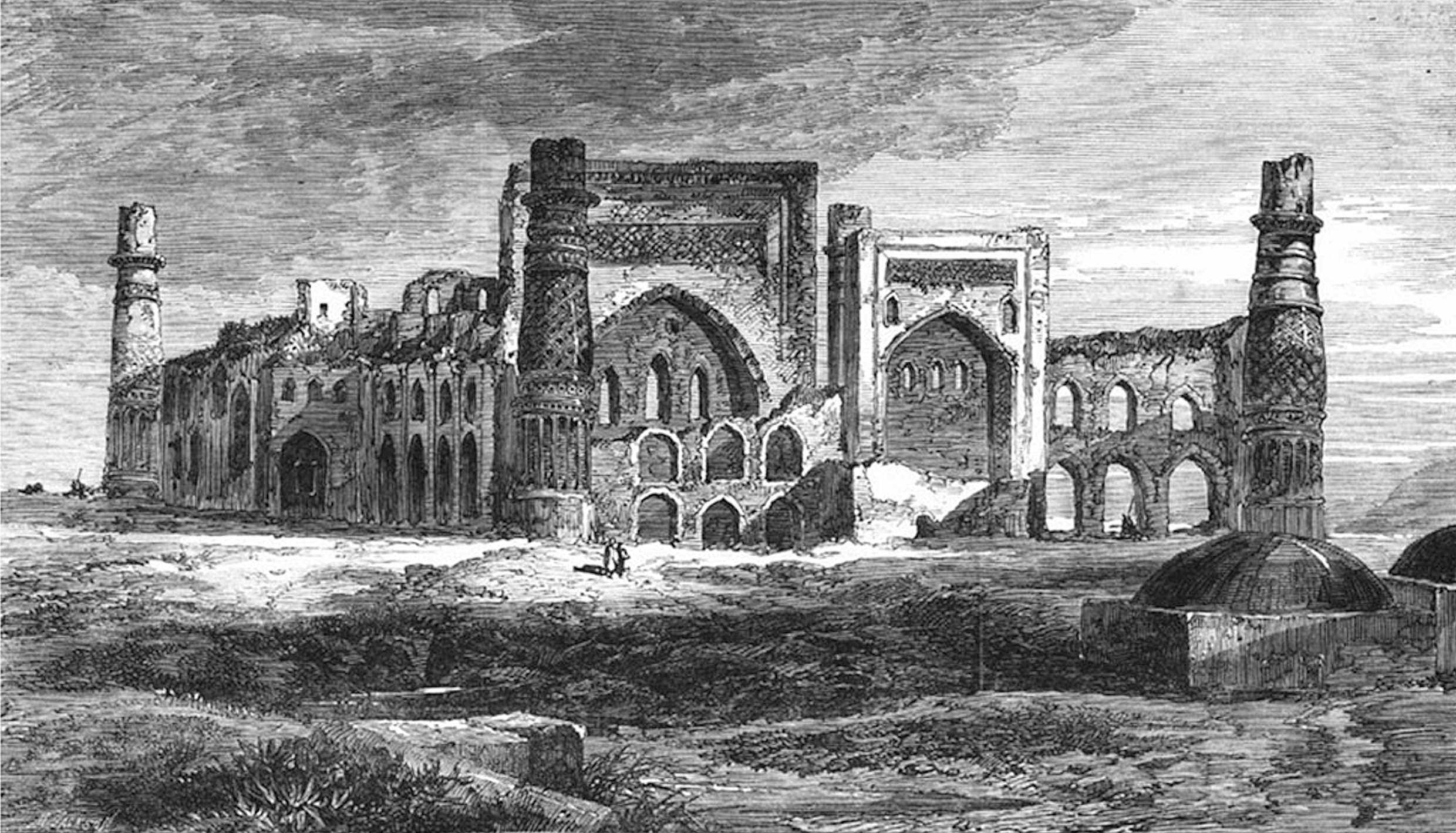
Gawhar Shad Mosque in Herat. Illustrated London News, 1863

Shah Rukh's wife, Gawhar Shad, funded the construction of two mosques, the Gawhar Shad Mosque in Mashhad and the Gawhar Shad Mosque in Herat. The two mosques were completed circa 1430. In Herat, she also built the Gawhar Shad Mausoleum where numerous Timurids were to be buried, and the theological college of the Gawhar Shad Madrasa.

The cultural outlook of the Timurids was characterized by a combination of Persian civilization and art, with borrowings from China, and literature written in Persian as well as Chagatay and Arabic. Shah Rukh commissioned the production of a number of historical and geographic works by Hafiz-i Abru. Among them is Tāriḵ-e Šāhroḵ(i), the history of Shah Rukh's reign through 1413-14 (816 AH). It was later incorporated by its author into larger "universal history" compilations, Majmuʿa-ye Ḥāfeẓ-e Abru (a universal history work) and Majmaʿ al-tawāriḵ [al-solṭāni(ya)] (section Zobdat al-tawāriḵ-e Bāysonḡori).

== Foreign relations ==
During Shah Rukh's reign, relations between the Timurid state and Ming China, under the rule of the Yongle Emperor and his descendants, were normalised. This was contrasted by the preceding era of Timur and the Hongwu Emperor (the first emperor of Ming China) who almost started a war with each other (which was only averted by the death of Timur). Chinese embassies, led by Chen Cheng, visited Samarqand and Herat several times in 1414–1420, while a large embassy sent by Shah Rukh (and immortalized by its diarist, Ghiyāth-ud-dīn Naqqāsh) travelled to Beijing in 1419–22 and were hosted with lavish banquets and the exchange of gifts. Shah Rukh sent two letters in Arabic & Persian to the Yongle emperor inviting him to Islam & praising the virtues of Islamic Law (as opposed to the Yasa). The letters were also meant to assert Shah Rukh's independence & to clarify that the Timurids were not the vassals of the Ming dynasty.

Through his promotion of commercial and political relations with neighbouring kingdoms, Shah Rukh also maintained contact with several other contemporary rulers. Monarchs of the Aq Qoyunlu, India, Hurmuz and (in the early part of his reign) the Ottoman Empire made homage to him. Successive Sultans of Delhi, starting with Khizr Khan, exchanged embassies with the Timurid court and swore their loyalty to the emperor, while the Sultan of Bengal, Shamsuddin Ahmad Shah, had sought his military support. Relations with the Mamluks of Egypt, however, were increasingly tense due to Shah Rukh's attempts to assert dominance. They eventually normalised on the ascension of Sultan Jaqmaq, under whom the two rulers were amicable, but equal.

== Death and succession ==
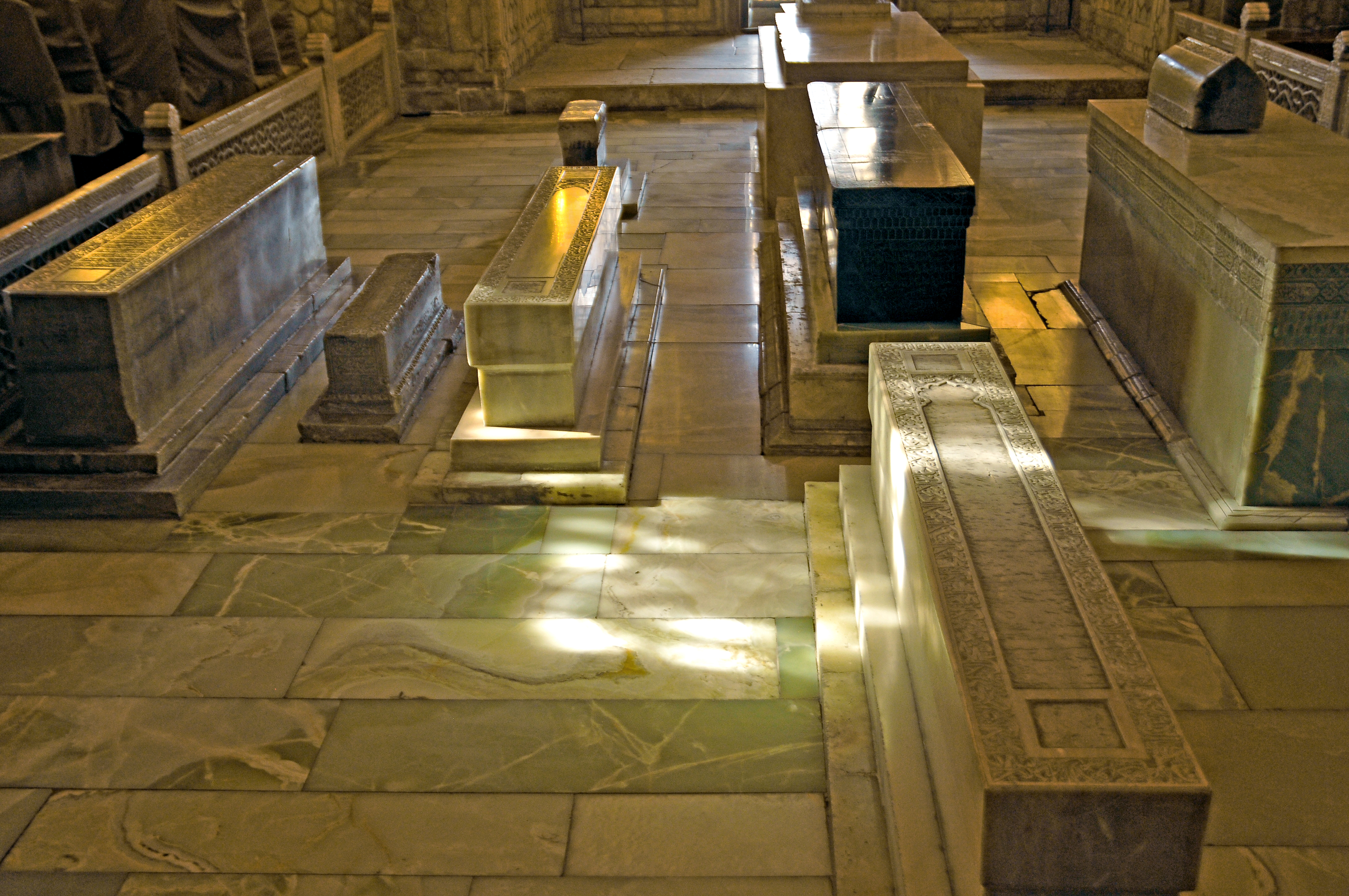
Shah Rukh's headstone (third from the left) beside Timur's in the Gur-e-Amir

Soon after suppressing Sultan Muhammad's revolt, Shah Rukh, by this point weakened by ill-health, died in his winter quarters in Rayy on 13 March 1447. Despite initial attempts to conceal it, news of the emperor's death quickly spread. Chaos erupted in the military camp, rendering transport of Shah Rukh's body to the capital for burial impossible. It was only on the third day following his death that the body, accompanied by the now-dowager empress Gawhar Shad and Shah Rukh's grandson Abdal-Latif, began its journey east. However, within a few days Abdal-Latif took both his grandmother and the corpse hostage, possibly in the hopes of launching his own bid for the vacant throne, or to support that of his father, Shah Rukh's last surviving son Ulugh Beg. Ala al-Dawla, another grandson, defeated his cousin's troops and liberated Gawhar Shad, and afterwards had Shah Rukh interred in the Gawhar Shad Mausoleum in Herat. When Ulugh Beg captured the city the following year, he ordered his father's body to be exhumed before reburying it with Timur's in the Gur-e-Amir in Samarqand. (Note: Alternatively, historian Maria Subtelny attributes the final transfer of Shah Rukh's body, as well as the commissioning of his marble tombstone, to his daughter Payanda Sultan.)

The succession struggle among Shah Rukh's family continued for several years, initially between Ulugh Beg and Ala al-Dawla, in which the former emerged victorious. However, he was murdered by his son Abdal-Latif in 1449, and in the subsequent civil wars, control of the Timurid Empire passed from Shah Rukh's descendants.

=== Forensic reconstruction by Gerasimov ===
The corpse of Shah Rukh followed a complicated journey. His body was then transferred to Herat and buried in the Gawhar Shad Mausoleum built by his wife Gawhar Shad. In 1448, his son Ulugh Beg occupied Herat briefly, and arranged for his remains to be transferred to Samarkand. The inscription on his tombstone indicates his daughter Payanda Sultan Bika handled the transfer, and that she also who erected the gravestone in Samarkand. Despite the long and strenuous transfer to Samarkand, "in the difficult circumstances of a retreat after a lost battle", the anatomical arrangement of the remains surprisingly seemed undisturbed, which could have justified doubts about their authenticity.

Gerasimov excavated the remains and analysed the features of the skeleton and the skull. He determined that the main features of the skull were non-Mongoloid, and that the skull "was a typical representative of the brachycephalic Europoid" or the Ferghana-Pamir type characteristic of central Asia. This led Gerasimov to doubt that the remains were related to Timur and one of his wives. During the forensic reconstruction, based on the large difference in racial types, suggestions were made that Shah-Rukh may not have been an actual son of Timur. Still, Gerasimov considered that similarities in skull asymmetries suggested a blood relationship with the remains of Timur.

==== Controversies ====
The discrepancy between the racial types of the excavated skeletons remained a subject of interest for historians. Others have pointed out that the science of forensic reconstructions is today considered as quite inexact, and that the work of Gerasimov may have followed the promotion of the theory of "ethnogenesis" by the Soviets, which attempted to define a typical "Uzbek" type attached to the land from ancestral times. The reconstructed busts were considered "as physical proofs confirming the local Uzbek identity of the Timurid rulers". Gerasimov is also thought to have followed the Soviet narrative, by portraying Shah Rukh as "covetous, cruel and fanatic, in an elaborate silk turban adorned with a plume".

== Personal life ==
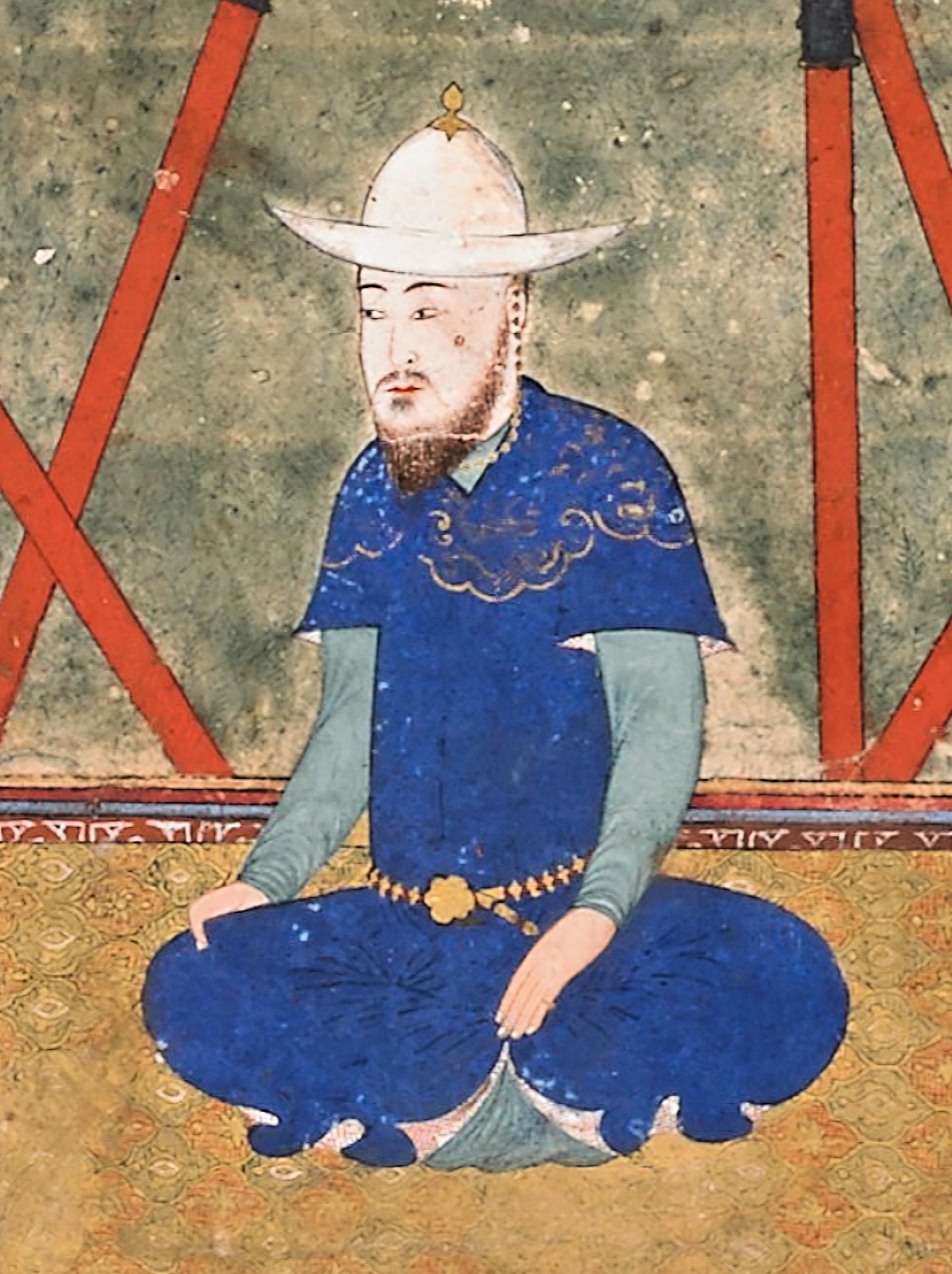
Ulugh Beg, eldest son of Shah Rukh, in a contemporary Timurid painting (1425–1450)

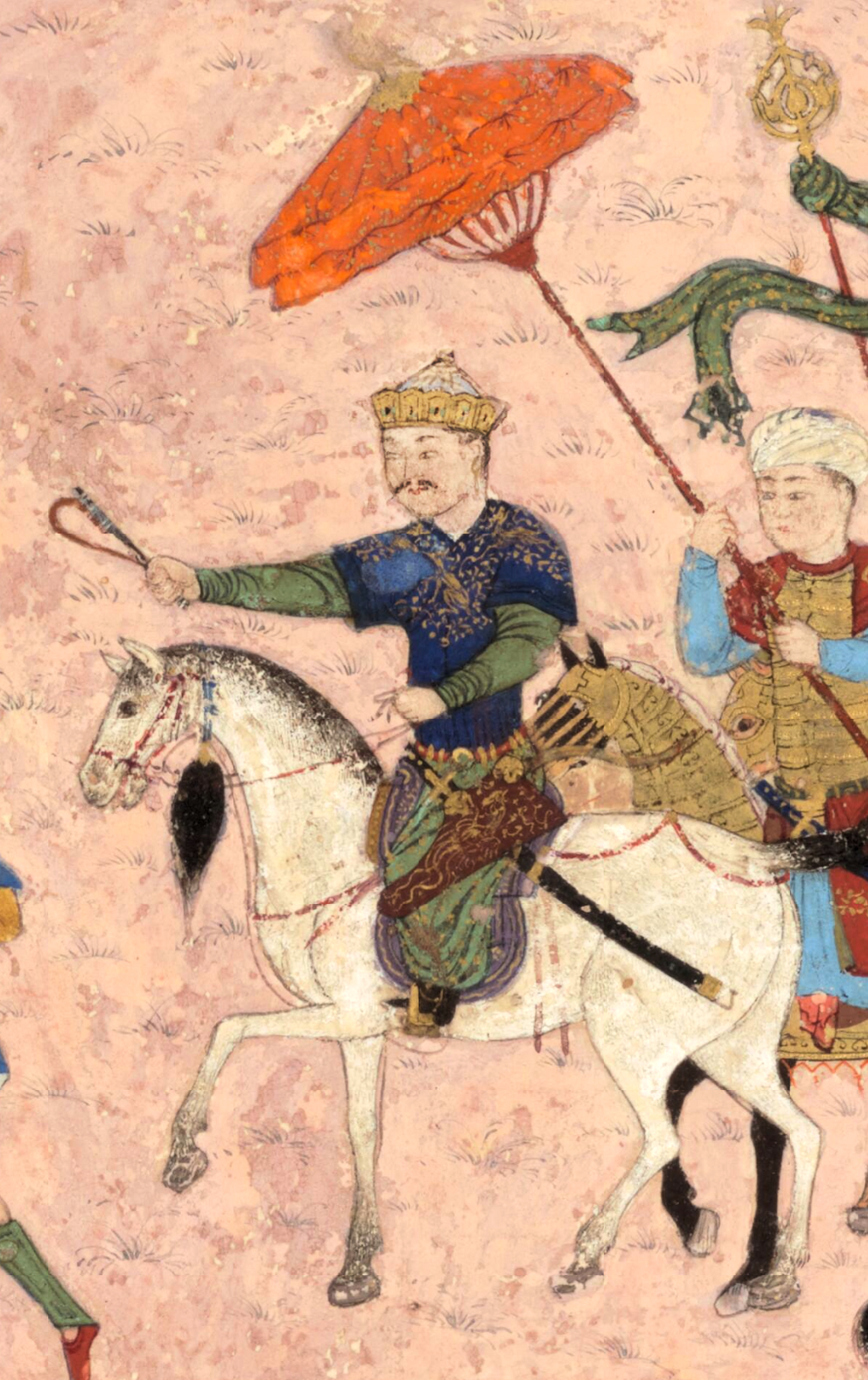
Muhammad Juki, youngest son of Shah Rukh, 1440–45. Shahnama, Herat (Royal Asiatic Society of Great Britain and Ireland, no. 239).

=== Consorts ===
Shah Rukh's household was small by Timurid standards: he married two women legally and had four concubines.

Wives

- Gawhar Shad, daughter of Ghiyas-ud-din Tarkhan; married c. 1388, died 1457
- Malikat Agha, daughter of Khizr Ughlan Chaghatay and widow of his brother Umar Shaikh Mirza I; given to Shah Rukh by Timur in a levirate union after 1394, died 1440

Concubines

- Tuti Khatun (or Tuti Agha), a Narin Mughal lady
- La'l Takin
- Mihr Nigar Khatun, an Uzbek Bisut lady; no issue
- Aq Sultan Khatun, daughter of Charkas bin Timan(?) Ilchigiday

=== Sons ===
Four of Shah Rukh's nine sons died in infancy or childhood.

- Ulugh Beg (1394–1449) – with Gawhar Shad Begum. Viceroy of Transoxiana, later succeeded his father.
- Sultan Ibrahim Mirza (1394–1435) – with Tuti Khatun. Viceroy of Persia.
- Baysunghur (1397–1433) – with Gawhar Shad Begum. Shah Rukh's artistic third son never had a vice-royal position, but played an important part in his father's government in Herat.
- Soyurghatmish Mirza (1399–1426) – with Malikat Agha. Viceroy of India and Ghazni.
- Muhammad Juki Mirza (1402–1445) – with Gawhar Shad Begum. Viceroy of Garmsir and Khuttal.
- Khan Ughli, also Jan Ughli (b. c. 1402) – with Aq Sultan Khatun. Died in childhood.
- Muhammad Yaruti (c. 1403 – c. 1408) – with La'l Takin. Died aged five.
- Jahanshah – with Malikat Agha. Died aged one.
- Bek Ughli – with Aq Sultan Khatun. Died in infancy.

=== Daughters ===
Only two of Shah Rukh's six daughters reached adulthood.

- Maryam Sultan Agha (d. 1441) – with Gawhar Shad Begum. Married first, in 1413, to Muhammad Jahangir Mirza, son of Muhammad Sultan Mirza, son of Jahangir Mirza; and after 1433 to his brother Yahya Mirza
- Qutlugh Tarkhan Agha – with Gawhar Shad Begum. Died aged five.
- Sa'adat Sultan Agha – with Gawhar Shad Begum. Died in infancy.
- Taghay Tarkan Agha – with Tuti Khatun. Died in infancy.
- Qutlugh Sultan Agha – with Tuti Khatun. Died in infancy.
- Payanda Sultan Agha – with Aq Sultan Khatun. Married to Yahya Mirza, son of Muhammad Sultan Mirza, son of Jahangir Mirza

== See also ==
- Ahmed Lur
- Miraj Nameh

== Notes ==
Shah Rukh Timurid dynasty
Preceded by Khalil Sultan	Timurid Empire; 1405–1447	Succeeded by Ulugh Beg
