= Miran Shah =

Timurid prince (1366–1408)

Miran Shah میران شاه
- Timurid prince
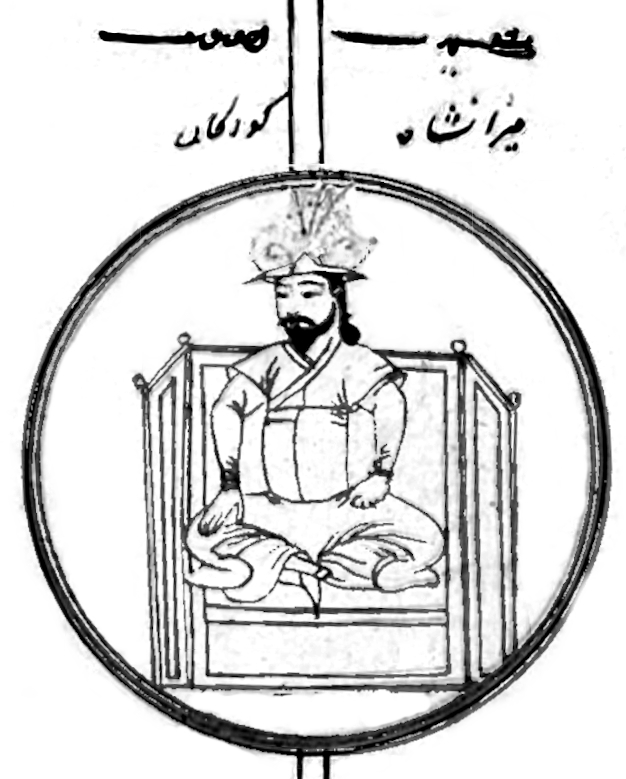
- Contemporary portrait of Miran Shah, commissioned in 1405–1409 by his son Khalil Sultan for an illustrated Timurid genealogy (TSMK, H2152)
- Born: c. 1366 (Note: Woods gives Miran Shah's birth as 768–769 AH, corresponding to 1366–1368, and his age at death as about 41.)
- Died: 21 April 1408 (aged 41–42) (Note: Woods dates his death to 24 Dhu al-Qa'da 810 AH, that is 21 April 1408; the date is also given as 20 April.); Sardrud, Timurid Empire (present-day Iran)
- Burial: Gur-e-Amir, Samarkand (present-day Uzbekistan)
- Consorts: Urun Sultan Khanika; Daulat Galdi; Sevin Beg and nine others
- Issue: Khalil Sultan Mirza; Abu Bakr Mirza; Umar Mirza; Sultan Muhammad Mirza; Qutlugh Sultan Khanum; Sayyidi Ahmad; Several other children
Names
- Mu'izz al-Din Abu Muhammad Abu al-Fath Miran Shah Kuragan
- House: Timurid dynasty
- Father: Timur
- Mother: Minglijik Beg Agha
- Religion: Islam

Mirza Jalal-ud-din Miran Shah Beg (Persian: جلال الدین میران شاه بیگ, c. 1366 – 21 April 1408), commonly known as Miran Shah (Persian: میران شاه), was a son of the Central Asian conqueror Timur, founder of the Timurid Empire. In the Timurid genealogical tradition he carries the laqab Mu'izz al-Din and the kunyas Abu Muhammad and Abu al-Fath, together with the Mongol title kuragan ("royal son-in-law"), which reflects his marriage to Urun Sultan Khanika, a daughter of the Chinggisid khan Suyurghatmish. (Note: Woods gives the laqab as Mu'izz al-Din; the form Jalal al-Din appears in some other works. He places the title kuragan in brackets.)

During his father's reign, Miran Shah was initially a powerful regional governor and prominent military commander, having aided Timur in his conquests as well as suppressing several revolts. However, after facing accusations of destructive and hedonistic behaviour, the prince was later deposed from these roles by the emperor. Following Timur's death in 1405, Miran Shah became embroiled in the ensuing war of succession, having thrown his support behind his son Khalil Sultan. He was later killed whilst battling against the Timurids' traditional rivals, the Qara Qoyunlu.

Though never ruling in his own right, the line of Miran Shah played a prominent role in the history of the Timurid Empire. His grandson Abu Sa'id Mirza eventually came to rule the majority of Transoxiana in the latter half of the 15th century. Abu Sa'id's own grandson was Babur, the founder of the Mughal Empire of India.

== Early life ==
Miran Shah was born in 1366, the third of Timur's four sons. His mother was Minglijik Beg Agha, also called Shangul Beg Agha, of the Ja'uni Qurbani (Jauni Qurban); Woods classes her as a dukhtar-khana, a woman of the ruler's household, rather than as a quma or concubine. In an earlier study Woods gives her name as Mengli Khatun, daughter of Hayut.

In 1380, prior to his conquest of Khorasan, Timur pre-emptively named Miran Shah (at this point fourteen years old) governor of the region. The kingdom was then under the rule of the Kartid dynasty, who quickly submitted to Timur's army following the Siege of Herat (1381). In 1383, the head of the former royal family, Ghiyas-uddin Pir 'Ali, became complicit in a plot against Timur. Miran Shah quickly crushed the rebellion and annexed the Kartid capital of Herat, which he made his viceregal seat. Several years later, the last of the Kartids, Ghiyas-uddin's son Pir Muhammad, was killed by Miran Shah in a banquet that the latter hosted. Chroniclers Abd al-Razzaq Samarqandi and Sharaf al-Din Ali Yazdi (writing in the Matla al-sa'dayn and Zafarnama respectively) record Miran Shah as having laughed whilst decapitating the prince; they note that he later explained his actions as being due to excessive drinking.

== Military career ==
In the winter of 1386, Timur launched an invasion of Azerbaijan, an area that had by that point been sought after by the Golden Horde for over a century. Tokhtamysh, the khan of the Golden Horde and Timur's erstwhile ally, sent his army against the invading force and defeated their advance-guard, resulting in the loss of forty of Timur's officers. Miran Shah was commanded to avenge this defeat and routed the enemy force, pursuing the fleeing soldiers as far as Derbent, the frontier of the Golden Horde. Some of Tokhtamysh's most distinguished followers were taken captive, who were then escorted by Miran Shah to his father's winter quarters in Karabakh, where they were presented to Timur in chains. Contrary to his usual practice, however, Timur treated the prisoners leniently and returned them to Tokhtamysh. They were sent bearing only paternal reproaches towards the Khan, a final, ultimately unsuccessful attempt by Timur to discourage his former mentee from further hostilities.

Several revolts were also put down by Miran Shah in subsequent years. In 1389 the governor of Tus, Amir Hajji Beg Jauni Qurbani, aided by a Sarbadar ruler, sought to make himself independent. Timur sent Miran Shah who, after a protracted siege of several months, had Tus sacked and razed, with the city suffering a heavy death toll.

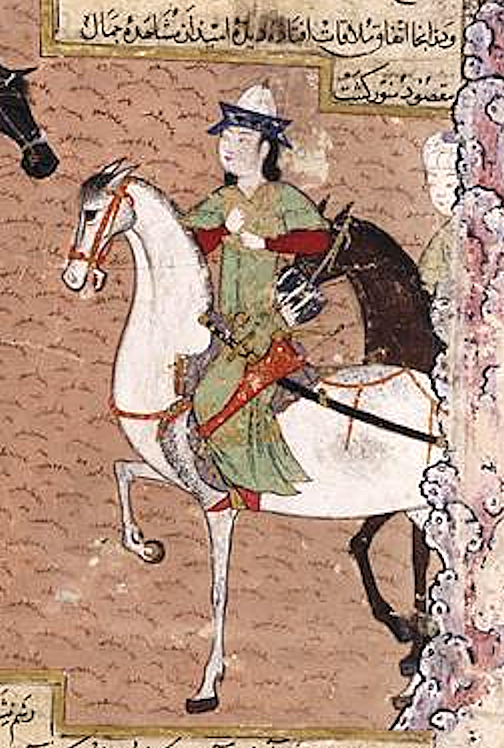
Likely depiction of the young Miran Shah (21 years old) in 1387, when he accompanied Timur in his campaigns in northwestern Iran, from a Zafarnama of 1435–1436

In 1394, Timur entered a conflict with members of a Sufi sect known as the Hurufis. This was likely a result of both heresy charges laid against the group by traditional religious scholars, as well as Timur's own attempts to remove potential threats to his rule from the area. Miran Shah was instructed to arrest the founder of the movement Fazlallah Astarabadi al-Hurufi who was, according to legend, executed by the prince himself. The death of their leader led al-Hurufi's followers to have a specific hatred against the Timurids. Miran Shah in particular was considered to be the Dajjal (Antichrist) and was further mocked as Maran Shah (King of Snakes).

== Viceroy of Persia ==
By 1393, Timur had conquered all the lands that had formerly been part of the Mongol Ilkhanate. This dominion, which Timur termed "the throne of Hulagu", was bestowed upon Miran Shah. The prince's fief was now the entirety of northern Persia and Transcaucasia, and included the cities of Baghdad, Tabriz and Soltaniyeh.

However Miran Shah, who had been suffering from mental issues following a fall from his horse several years earlier, began to show increasingly destructive tendencies during his rule. Ruy González de Clavijo, the Castilian ambassador to Timur's court, claimed that the prince had ancient buildings destroyed, supposedly so that it would be known that "Miran Shah did nothing himself, but he ordered the finest works in the world to be demolished". The biographer Dawlatshah reported that Miran Shah also ordered the tomb of the historian Rashid-al-Din Hamadani be dismantled and for his bones to be re-interred in a Jewish cemetery. This was said to be due to the latter's Semitic descent. There are doubts however regarding this claim, since Miran Shah was purported to have had an interest in Muslim historic literature.

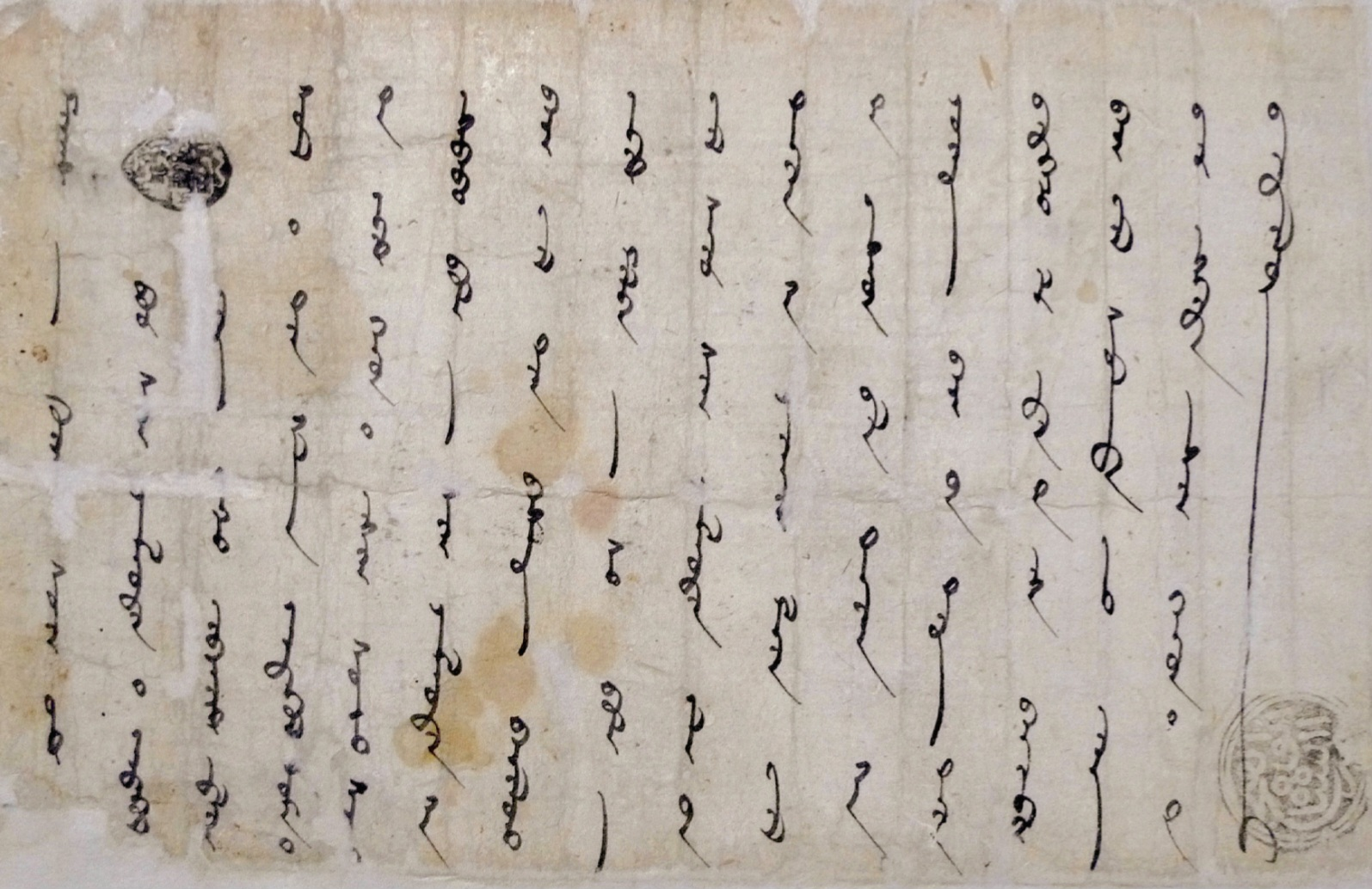
A firman dating to the viceroyalty of Miran Shah, composed in Chagatai Turkic and written in the Old Uyghur script

Reports eventually started reaching Timur of his son's behaviour. Stories were heard in the imperial court of chaotic gambling, drinking bouts held within mosques and gold coins being scattered from palace windows to frenzied mobs. Miran Shah's excessive lifestyle evidently took its toll on his health, as he was described by Clavijo as "big and fat, and he suffers much from the gout."

In addition to this, Timur had concerns regarding unrest and taxation problems in Miran Shah's domains, as well as the prince's military failures. Chief among these was his inability to capture the fortress of Alinja from the Jalairid Sultanate in 1395. Miran Shah placed Alinja under siege, catching Prince Tahir, son of Sultan Ahmad Jalayir inside. George VII of Georgia later broke through the siege, allowing Tahir to escape.

Worries had also been raised for the emperor regarding his son's loyalty. Miran Shah had alluded in letters about his father's increasing age and doubts about Timur's continued capabilities of ruling. These suspicions were realised when Miran Shah's wife, the Khwarezmian princess Khanzada Begum, reached out to her father-in-law. Khanzada reported her husband's rebellious intentions as well as complaining about her mistreatment at his hands. Dawlatshah states that Timur was moved to tears when Khanzada presented to him her blood-stained chemise, though this episode was not confirmed in contemporary sources. Official histories only state that Miran Shah made crude accusations against her that were later disproved. Nevertheless, the angry Khanzada never returned to her husband and remained with Timur in Samarqand.

In 1399, Timur sent a detachment of troops under his nephew Sulaiman Shah to investigate his concerns. Miran Shah, without posing any difficulties, returned with them to face his father, who had by this point arrived in Soltaniyeh to confront him. Having tied a rope around his neck, Miran Shah appeared before the emperor and begged for his forgiveness. Timur was said to have been at the point of ordering his son's execution, only refraining due to the intercession of his relatives and nobles. Instead, Miran Shah was deposed from his lands and assigned to Timur's own retinue, where he would remain for the next four years. His friends and advisers, among whom were well known figures, were severely punished, with some being executed for the alleged crime of corrupting the prince and leading him astray.

== War of succession and death ==
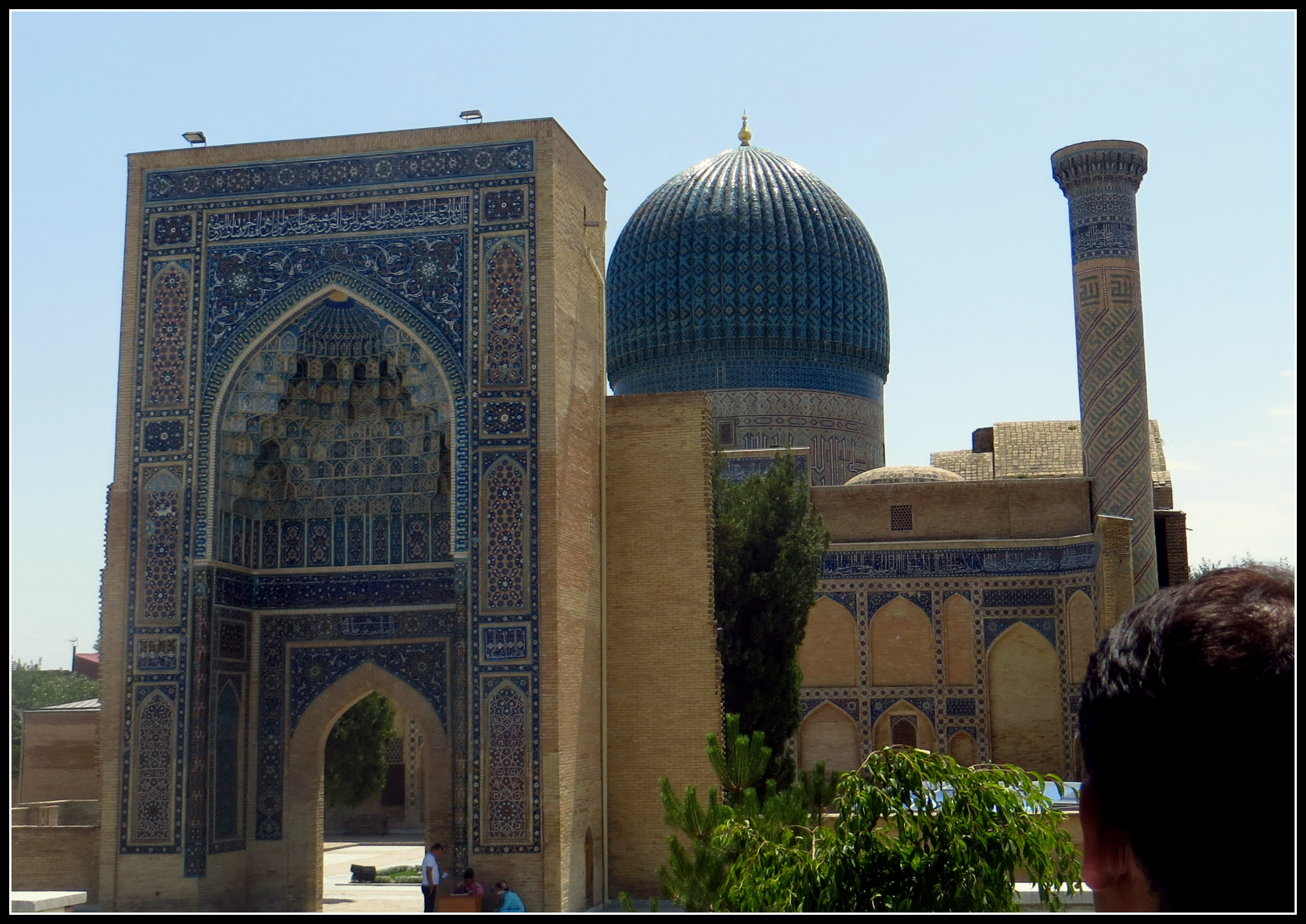
The Gur-e-Amir in Samarqand, Uzbekistan

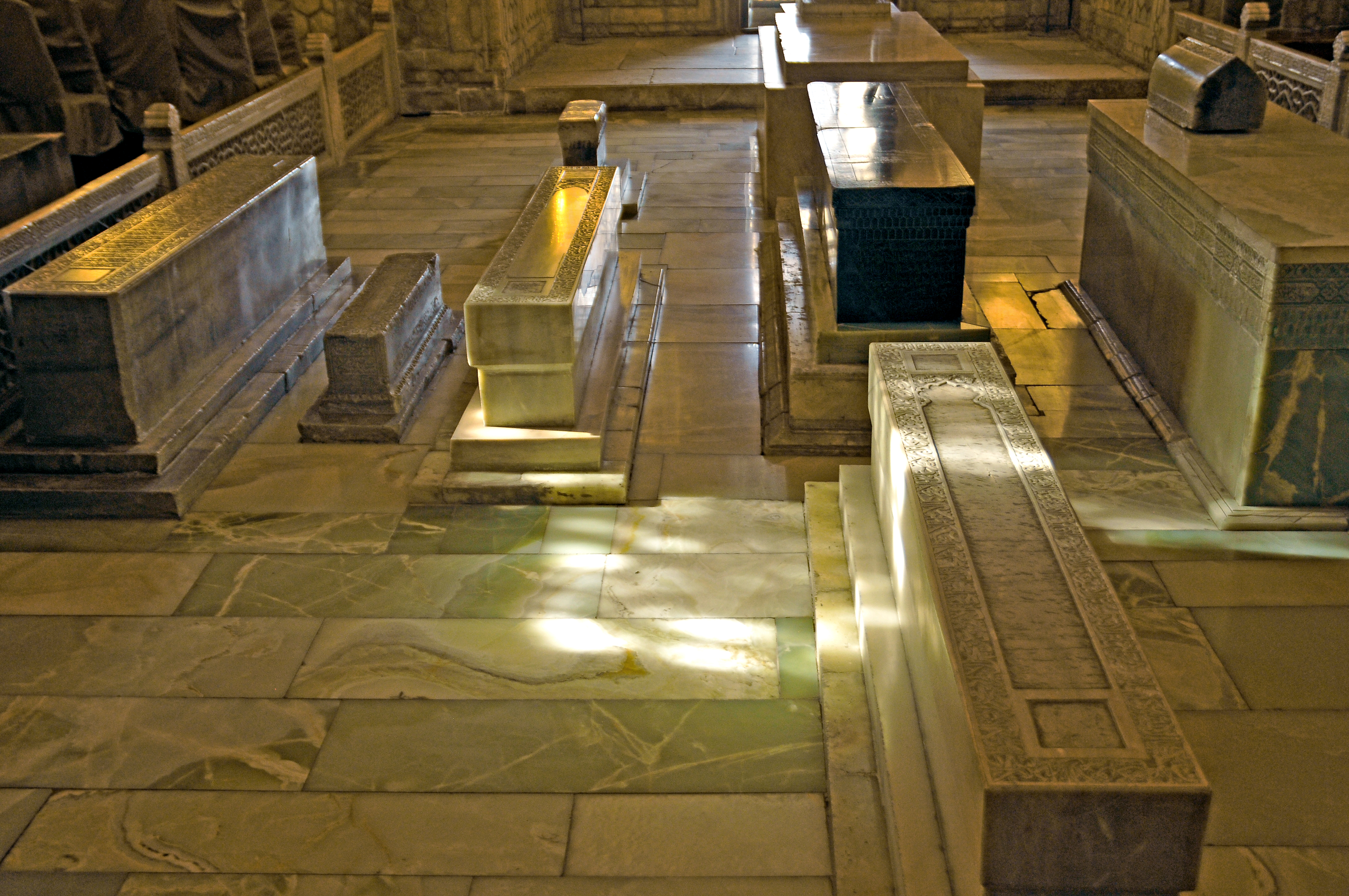
Miran Shah's headstone (far left) in the Gur-e-Amir

Timur had never unambiguously appointed an heir, so at the time of his death in February 1405, a succession dispute erupted among his surviving sons and grandsons. Miran Shah was Timur's eldest living son by this point, but was not considered an active contender to the throne and was passed over in favour of his own son, Khalil Sultan.

The latter proclaimed himself emperor at Tashkent soon after his grandfather's death and seized the royal treasury, as well as Timur's imperial capital Samarqand. Sultan Husayn Tayichiud, a maternal grandson of Timur as well as Miran Shah's son-in-law, also made a bid for the throne before aligning himself with Khalil Sultan. Shah Rukh, governor of Herat and Timur's other surviving son, made no offensive move against his nephews at this point. This was likely due to Miran Shah, who posed a serious threat as he, along with his other son Abu Bakr, had led an army out of Azerbaijan in support of Khalil Sultan.

However, Miran Shah and Abu Bakr were forced to withdraw prior to being able to do this. Ahmad Jalayir, who had been expelled by Timur fifteen years previously, took advantage of the old emperor's death to recapture his former lands. The two princes drove out Jalayir at Tabriz before being forced to contend with another former enemy: Qara Yusuf, ruler of the Qara Qoyunlu.

In 1406, Qara Yusuf defeated the Timurids at the Battle of Nakhchivan and captured Tabriz. Miran Shah and Abu Bakr attempted to retake the city at the Battle of Sardrud on 21 April 1408, but were decisively defeated by the joint efforts of the Turkomans and Jalayirids. As a result of this rout, all of Timur's western conquests were lost, with the Timurids being subsequently driven out of western Persia.

Though Abu Bakr had managed to escape, Miran Shah was struck down during the battle by a Turkoman chief who, having not recognised the prince, had stripped and looted his body. Qara Yusuf then had his head impaled before the walls of Tabriz to induce the city's inhabitants to surrender. Shortly thereafter, the Turkoman ruler sent Miran Shah's head and body, along with his own condolences, to Shah Rukh, who had emerged the victor in the war of succession. Miran Shah was buried alongside his father in the Gur-e-Amir in Samarqand.

== Family ==
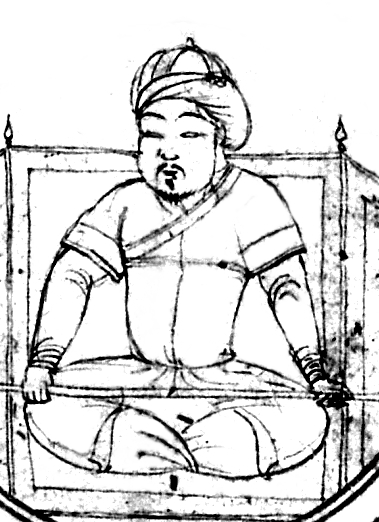
Contemporary portrait of Khalil Sultan, Miran Shah's son by Sevin Beg, from a Timurid genealogy of 1405–1409

The fullest reconstruction of Miran Shah's household is that of the historian John E. Woods, whose genealogical tables record twelve consorts and twenty children. Woods lists the consorts in a single sequence rather than dividing them into wives and concubines, annotating some as quma (concubine) and others as dukhtar-khana, a term used of women of a ruler's household; the numbering below follows his. (Note: Woods's table brackets the names of other members of the dynasty after four of the children: Timur's wife Saray Mulk Khanum after Khalil Sultan; Timur's wife Tuman Agha after Biki Sultan, together with an atabak, Dulaka Qauchin, and an ataka, Muhammad Khvaja; and Timur's grandson Muhammad Sultan after the unnamed son of Fakhira and after Gulshan Beki. These appear to record the households in which the children were brought up.)

1. Urun Sultan Khanika, daughter of Suyurghatmish Khan, a descendant of Ögedei Khan whom Timur installed as khan of the Chagatai Khanate; married c. 1380
  - Abu Bakr, born c. 1382, died 1409; he married Öruz Hatun, daughter of the Ottoman sultan Bayezid I and the Serbian princess Olivera Lazarević, in 1403, and had at least a daughter, Aisha
  - Umar, born c. 1383, died April 1407 at the age of 24
  - Qutlugh Sultan Khanum, married first Sultan Husayn Tayichiud (died 1405), by whom she had a daughter, Firuza Begum, and second, after 1405, a sayyid of Tirmiz
2. Daulat Galdi, daughter of Payanda Sultan, son of Jahangir Barlas
  - Sayyidi Ahmad, born c. 1408, after his father's death; he married first Ruqaya Sultan, daughter of Qara Yuluk Uthman Beg, and second Sahib Sultan, and had five sons: Muhammad Baqir (died 1475), Timur Usman, Zaynal and Muzaffar by the first marriage and Ghazanfar (died 1490) by the second
3. Sevin Beg, known as Khanzada, daughter of Aq Husayn Sufi of the Qunqirat and of a daughter of Öz Beg Khan of the Golden Horde; widow of Miran Shah's brother Jahangir, married after 1376, died 1411. In an earlier study Woods identified her mother as Shukur Beg Agha, a daughter of Jani Beg.
  - Khalil Sultan, born 1384
  - Muhammad Qasim, died at the age of one
  - Biki Sultan, married Iskandar, son of Umar Shaikh I, and later his brother Bayqara I
  - Fatima Sultan, died in infancy
4. Murad, a dukhtar-khana
  - Jamshid Shirgha, died in infancy
5. Ruhparwar, a dukhtar-khana and quma
  - Qarachar, died in infancy
6. Nigar, a dukhtar-khana
  - Sa'adat Sultan, married Majd Haji, son of Khvaja Laq of the Qunqirat, by whom she had a son, Mahmud
7. Fakhira, a dukhtar-khana
  - A son whose name is not recorded
8. Bakht Sultan, by whom no children are recorded
9. Daulat Bakht, a quma, daughter of Abu Ishaq, son of Charik, son of Fulad Bugha of the Chaghatay
  - Muhammad Timur, born c. 1406; he married Khadija, also called Khvand Sultan Biki, daughter of Bayqara, son of Umar Shaikh I, and was the father of Rabi'a Sultan, wife of Sultan Abu Sa'id, as well as of a son, Ahmad, and a daughter by unnamed mothers
  - Rajab Sultan, also called Agha Beki, married Sa'd Vaqqas, son of Muhammad Sultan, and then Sanjar, son of Pir Muhammad, both grandsons of Jahangir
  - Rabi'a Sultan, died in infancy
10. Mihr Nush, possibly a quma, daughter of Bustan, son of Fulad Bugha of the Chaghatay
  - Sultan Muhammad, born c. 1405, died before c. 1452; by Shah Islam, daughter of Suhrab Kurd, he was the father of Manuchihr (died c. 1468) and of Fatima Sultan, wife of Farrukhzad, and by another woman of Sultan Abu Sa'id, born 1426–1427
11. Tini Bek, a quma
  - Ijil, born 1394–1395, died 1415
12. Shirin Beg, also called Shirin Malik, a quma
  - Suyurghatmish, born 1399
  - Gulshan Beki, who appears to have died in infancy

Woods records one further son, Sultan Husayn, whose mother is not named. (Note: He is a different person from Miran Shah's son-in-law Sultan Husayn Tayichiud.)
