= Michael Shenkar =

Archaeologist and historian of pre-Islamic Iran and Central Asia

- Born: 13 April 1981 (age 45); Kuybyshev (now Samara), Russian Soviet Socialist Republic, Soviet Union
- Education: Hebrew University of Jerusalem (PhD, 2013)
- Awards: Prix Ghirshman (2015); Polonsky Prize (2026)
- Scientific career
- Fields: Iranian studies; Central Asian archaeology; Zoroastrianism
- Workplaces: Hebrew University of Jerusalem; Samarkand State University (visiting)

Michael Shenkar is an archaeologist and historian of pre-Islamic Iran and Central Asia. He is associate professor of Ancient Iranian and Central Asian Studies at the Hebrew University of Jerusalem, where he directs the Institute for Asian and African Studies and the Kliakhandler Programme in Central Asian Studies.

His research concerns religious imagery, Sogdian civilisation and kingship in Central Asia. He co-directs the excavations at Sanjar-Shah in Tajikistan and is a member of Academia Europaea.

== Education ==
Michael Shenkar completed his doctorate at the Hebrew University of Jerusalem in 2013.

== Academic career ==
In 2013–2014, Michael Shenkar was a research and teaching associate at the Collège de France in Paris. He then held an Alexander von Humboldt research fellowship at the German Archaeological Institute in Berlin in 2014–2015. He joined the Hebrew University as a senior lecturer in Pre-Islamic Iranian Studies in 2015 and became an associate professor in 2020.

He was a visiting fellow at Wolfson College, Oxford, and a visiting scholar at the Oxford Nizami Ganjavi Centre in 2023–2024, becoming an honorary affiliate of the centre in 2024. That year, he also became a visiting professor at Samarkand State University in Uzbekistan.

== Research ==
Michael Shenkar studies the art, archaeology and religions of Iran and Central Asia before and during the early centuries of Islamic rule. His work examines Zoroastrianism, Sogdian society and the interaction of urban populations with Eurasian nomads along the Silk Road.

=== Religious imagery ===
His first monograph, Intangible Spirits and Graven Images: The Iconography of Deities in the Pre-Islamic Iranian World (2014), brings together depictions of gods from across the Iranian world. It considers how deities were identified and represented in different regions, and the relationship between visual evidence and religious texts. Reviewing the book in Numen, Christoph Uehlinger described the book as "a mine of information and insights" and "an "indispensable vademecum for anyone concerned with pre-Islamic Iranian religion".

In “Rethinking Sasanian Iconoclasm” (2015), Michael Shenkar challenged Mary Boyce’s account of an organised campaign against divine images under the Sasanians. He distinguished worship without cult images from the destruction of images, arguing that the literary and archaeological evidence did not establish a systematic Sasanian programme of iconoclasm. Uehlinger endorsed the rejection of a Sasanian iconoclastic movement in his review of the monograph.

His subsequent study “The Great Iranian Divide” (2017) explored the contrast between the aniconic cults of western Iran and the worship of anthropomorphic divine images among the Kushans and Sogdians. He related this difference to the stronger influence of Greek religious practices in the eastern Iranian world. In a 2026 article on Kushano-Sasanian Bactria, he examined coins and temple remains to argue that the new Persian rulers continued to support local image cults, combining them with Iranian traditions of fire worship.

=== Sogdian society and religion ===
Michael Shenkar has examined Sogdian religion in relation to the political organisation of the city-states. His study of the Sogdian pantheon emphasises local civic cults and temples, and considers the relationship between religious and political offices.

His research on the origins of the self-governing civic communities known as nāf proposes that they emerged between the first century BCE and the second century CE, during Sogdiana’s incorporation in Kangju. In his 2020 study, he used the Kultobe inscriptions and comparisons with Greek city-states and medieval Italian republics to associate their development with Sogdian settlement abroad and the expansion of trade. Lauren Morris discussed this reconstruction while considering the possibility that early uses of nāf referred to kinship or tribal groups subsequently adapted to urban self-government.

In his work on the Arab conquest, Michael Shenkar’s position is that the dismantling of Sogdian civic communities was one of the major causes of the decline of Sogdian civilisation, alongside prolonged warfare. Eugenio Garosi drew on this interpretation in his discussion of changes in Central Asian scribal practices.

=== Kingship and the cultures of the steppe ===
Kings of Cities and Rulers of the Steppes: Representations of Kingship in Pre-Islamic Central Asia (2025) traces royal imagery from the Bronze Age to the early Islamic period. Drawing on coins, seals, wall paintings, sculpture and royal dress, Michael Shenkar examines how rulers represented their authority and how the traditions of the steppe were adapted in the cities of Central Asia.

The book gives particular attention to collective sovereignty within royal clans: political authority shared among members of a ruling family, often over separate territories. It relates this organisation of power to the interaction between nomadic and sedentary societies. In sehepunkte, Marco Ferrario praised the breadth of its catalogue and visual documentation, while questioning its limited engagement with comparative theories of kingship and its compressed treatment of earlier periods.

== Archaeological fieldwork ==
Since 2014, Michael Shenkar has co-directed excavations at Sanjar-Shah, near Panjakent in Tajikistan, with Sharof Kurbanov of the Tajik Academy of Sciences. The project investigates a Sogdian town and its transformation after the eighth-century Arab conquest. Finds include a palace constructed in the 740s and fragments of its painted and carved decoration.

With Ofir Haim and Sharof Kurbanov, Michael Shenkar published three eighth-century Arabic letters from the site in 2016. The letters, discovered in 2008, were dated by the authors between 721/722 and the 780s. The authors identified them as the earliest surviving Arabic documents written on paper.

In 2025, Michael Shenkar, Sharof Kurbanov and Abdurahmon Pulotov published wall-painting fragments discovered in 2022–2023, which they identified as the first known depiction of fire worship in Sogdian wall painting. The reconstruction was covered in Archaeology.

Michael Shenkar has also been academic director of the Kafyrkala excavations in Tajikistan since 2024.

== Honours and memberships ==
Intangible Spirits and Graven Images received the Prix Ghirshman of the Académie des Inscriptions et Belles-Lettres in 2015. Michael Shenkar was elected to the History and Archaeology section of Academia Europaea in 2025. He is also a corresponding member of the German Archaeological Institute.

In 2026, he received first prize in the researcher category of the Hebrew University’s Polonsky Prizes for Creativity and Originality in the Humanistic Disciplines, in connection with Kings of Cities and Rulers of the Steppes.

== Selected publications ==
=== Books ===
- Michael Shenkar (2014). Intangible Spirits and Graven Images: The Iconography of Deities in the Pre-Islamic Iranian World. Brill. ISBN 9789004281486.
- Michael Shenkar (2025). Kings of Cities and Rulers of the Steppes: Representations of Kingship in Pre-Islamic Central Asia. Harrassowitz. ISBN 9783447123440.

=== Selected articles ===
- Michael Shenkar (2015). "Rethinking Sasanian Iconoclasm". Journal of the American Oriental Society. 135 (3): 471–498. doi:10.7817/jameroriesoci.135.3.471.
- Ofir Haim; Michael Shenkar; Sharof Kurbanov (2016). "The Earliest Arabic Documents Written on Paper: Three Letters from Sanjar-Shah (Tajikistan)" (PDF). Jerusalem Studies in Arabic and Islam. 43: 141–189.
- Michael Shenkar (2017). "The great Iranian divide: between aniconic West and anthropomorphic East". Religion. 47 (3): 378–398. doi:10.1080/0048721X.2017.1330989.
- Michael Shenkar (2020). "The Origin of the Sogdian Civic Communities (nāf)". Journal of the Economic and Social History of the Orient. 63 (3): 357–388. doi:10.1163/15685209-12341514.
- Michael Shenkar; Sharof Kurbanov; Abdurahmon Pulotov (2025). "A unique scene of fire worship from the late Sogdian palace at Sanjar-Shah". Antiquity. 99 (408): e61. doi:10.15184/aqy.2025.10180.
- Michael Shenkar (2026). "When east meets west: cultic fusion in Kushano-Sasanian Bactria". Journal of the Royal Asiatic Society. 36 (1): 209–221. doi:10.1017/S1356186325101260.
