= Ikhtiyar al-Din Ai-Taq =

Ikhtiyar al-Din Ai-Taq was an influential amir in western Khurasan following the decline of the Seljuks, and the ruler of Gurgan and Dihistan from 1161 until 1165.

== Career ==
Ai-Taq had originally been one of the Seljuk sultan Sanjar's ghulams. When Sanjar was captured by rebellious Ghuzz bands in 1153, Ai-Taq built up an army and quickly established his influence in the western regions of Sanjar's empire.

Ai-Taq had not been the only individual to take advantage of Sanjar's overthrow. In Nishapur another of Sanjar's former ghulams, Mu'ayyid al-Din Ai-Aba, had taken power and had gained control of a significant portion of Khurasan. Relations between Ai-Taq and Ai-Aba quickly soured and by 1158 warfare had broken out among them. Ai-Taq received military assistance from Shah Ghazi Rustam, the Bavandid ruler of Tabaristan. Despite this, his forces were defeated by Ai-Aba and Sultan Mahmud Khan and he was forced to flee to Tabaristan. In the end he was compelled to sue for peace and had to pay off his opponents.

In around 1160 Ai-Taq was attacked by a force of Ghuzz under their chief Yaghmur. Despite Bavandid support, he was defeated and was forced to flee. He made his way to Khwarezm, where the Khwarezmshah Il-Arslan supplied him with assistance. This enabled him to establish himself in Gurgan and Dihistan, where he acknowledged the suzerainty of Il-Arslan. Unfortunately for him, however, he eventually lost the support of the shah, and a Khwarezmid army expelled him from Dihistan in 1165.
