= Ala al-Din Tekish =

Shah of the Khwarazmian empire (r. 1172–1200 CE)

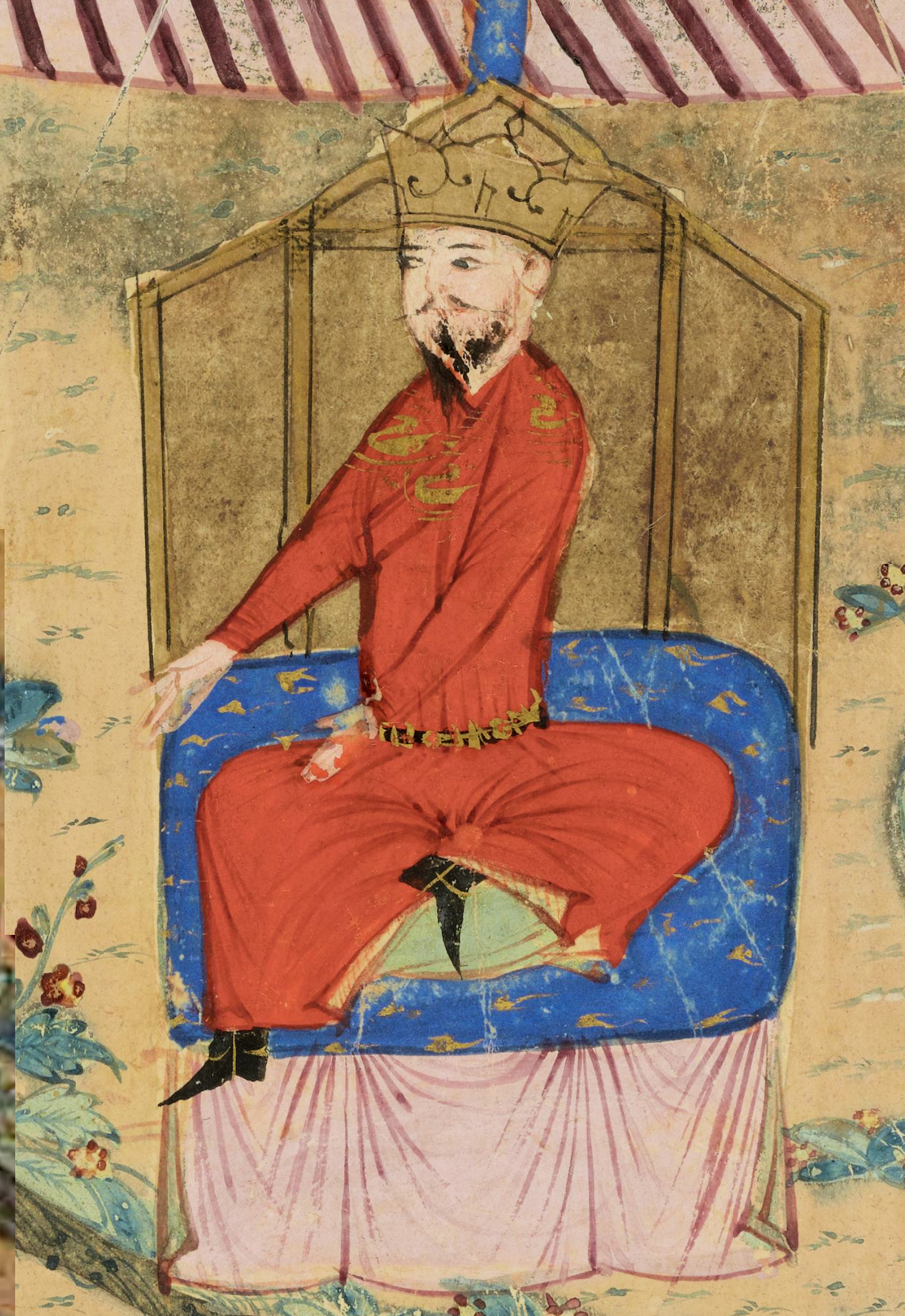
- Ala al-Din Tekish, Sultan of Khwarazm. Yale University Art Gallery.

Shah of the Khwarazmian Empire
- Reign: 11 December 1172 – 3 July 1200
- Coronation: 11 December 1172
- Predecessor: Il-Arslan
- Successor: Muhammad II
- Regent: Terken Khatun
- Born: Konye-Urgench
- Died: 3 July 1200
- Spouse: Terken Khatun
- Issue: Ala ad-Din Muhammad; Taj ad-Din Ali-Shah; Yunus-Khan; Toghan-Toghdi; Malik-Shah; Princess Shah-Khatun
Names
- Laqab: Ala al-Din (shortly); Kunya: Abul-Muzaffar; Given name: Tekish
- Dynasty: Anushtegin
- Father: Il-Arslan
- Mother: Terken Khatun
- Religion: Sunni Islam

Ala al-Din Tekish (Persian: علاء الدين تكش; full name: Ala ad-Dunya wa ad-Din Abul Muzaffar Tekish ibn Il-Arslan) or Tekesh or Takesh was the Shah of Khwarazmian Empire from 1172 to 1200. He was the eldest son of Il-Arslan.

== Accession ==
After Tekish's father Il-Arslan died in 1172, the former's mother Terken Khatun backed his younger brother, Soltan-Shah as the new Khwarazmshah by the time their father Il-Arslan died in 1172. Tekish, who was serving as governor of Jand appealed to the Qara Khitai for aid, and received reinforcements from Fuma, whose consort was the incumbent Qara Khitai monarch. Tekish marched on Gurganj which prompted Soltan-Shah and Terken Khatun to flee to Khorasan, receiving shelter from Mu'ayyid Ay-Aba, a vassal of Il-Arslan who chose to support them for expedience. Tekish officially became Khwarazmshah on 11 December 1172.

== Initial rule ==
The struggle for power remained vigorous. In spite of this, Tekish sent the Qara Khitai home, while Ay-Aba, Terken Khatun and Soltan Shah mustered forces on a campaign to overthrow Tekish and retrieve Gurganj. The ensuing battle occurred at the town of Suburni not far from the Khwarazmian heartland on 11 July 1174, whereupon Tekish routed his opponents and captured Ay-Aba, who was subsequently executed. Tekish pursued Soltan-Shah to Dihistan, where the former killed his mother and captured the city. In Khorasan, Ay-Aba had been succeeded by his son, Toghan-Shah, who pledged allegiance to Tekish and denied Soltan-Shah refuge when he was at the gates of Nishapur, forcing him to appeal to the Ghurids, who accepted his request for asylum.

Tekish reneged on his tribute agreement with the Qara Khitai, so Fuma invaded with the help of Soltan-Shah, but Tekish flooded the Oxus river and forced them to retreat. Fuma withdrew and left a few thousand cavalry to accompany Soltan-Shah, who went to Merv, which he captured successfully by 1180. In May 1181, he exacted revenge on Toghan-Shah, defeating his army, looting Nishapur, and conquering Tus.

Tekish was concerned with affairs in Transoxiana, and by 1181 he assigned one of his sons, Malik-Shah, to govern Jand while he and the Kipchaks devised a joint campaign to attack the Qara Khitai. Crucially, Tekish cemented ties with the Kipchak khan by marrying his daughter, Terken Khatun, giving him access to Kipchak and Kangly cavalrymen for future campaigns. Tekish marched on Bukhara where he defeated a sally by the garrison, prompting their surrender. What happened next is vaguely described by the source, but Tekish was back in Khorasan by 1183.

== Conquest of Khorasan ==
In 1185, Toghan-Shah passed away and his son, Sanjar-Shah assumed power in Nishapur. However, his atabeg, Mengi-Tegin controlled most respects of government and quickly began to act despotic, appropriating the land of nobles. Defectors reached Soltan-Shah in Merv and Mengi-Tegin rebelled. Tekish gathered his army with intent on pacifiying him, but Soltan-Shah attacked toward Amuya with plans to take Khwarazm. Tekish responded by approaching Merv, forcing Soltan-Shah to retreat and entrench himself in the city.

Tekish immediately marched on Nishapur, which he did in May 1186, forcing Mengi-Tegin to pay tribute to placate him, but shortly after Tekish returned to Gurganj, he rebelled again, killing ambassadors from Tekish's court and an important qadi and shaykh al-Islam, Burhan ad-Din 'Abd al-'Aziz Fakhr ad-Din 'Abd al-'Aziz al-Kufi. Tekish endeavored to siege Nishapur again on 27 March 1187, and it fell two months later. Mengi-Tegin was executed on the orders of Burhan ad-Din's father and Sanjar-Shah was sent to exile in Gurganj, effectively ending the Oghuz emirate of Nishapur, as the city was incorporated into Khwarazm.

Bayhaq, Qumis and Jam were also added to his domains, but Jam and Bakharz ceded to Soltan-Shah in spring 1188 to broker a truce between the two after Soltan-Shah failed to capture Nishapur shortly after the defeat of Mengi-Tegin, and a coronation ceremony was held in Radikat to affirm Tekish's independence. In 1191, Tekish forced the Bavandid Ispahbadh, Ardashir I, to cede Bistam and Damghan.

Conflict between Tekish and Soltan-Shah continued as the latter was defeated by the Ghurids in 1190 at the Battle of Marw al-Rudh, and was forced to become a vassal of theirs and was briefly in their captivity. Tekish demanded they extradite him, and upon refusal stormed and destroyed the fortress of Sarakhs. In 1192, Soltan-Shah invaded Khwarazm while Tekish was on an expedition to Rayy, but once he reached Gurganj he found the populace ready to defend it, and was repelled. Tekish arrived in 1193 and besieged and captured Abivard, and then the mustahfiz stationed at Sarakhs, Bahr ad-Din Chaqir, surrendered the town to him. Soltan-Shah, beleaguered and not as warlike as he was in his younger years, failed to provide an effective response, and died on 19/29 September 1193. Tekish captured Merv in December, making his son Malik-Shah the governor after taking all of the city's treasures.

== War with the Seljuks ==
Qizil-Arslan, the Eldiguzid atabeg had been assassinated in 1191 and various princes, including Qutlugh Inanch, grandson of Inanch, a Khwarazmian client ruler of Ray under Il-Arslan. Qutlugh took control over Ray, but also escaping from captivity was the Seljuk prince Toghrul III, who attacked him near Qazvin and inflicted a defeat on Qutlugh in 1192, who fled to Ray with his mother.

Qutlugh appealed to Ala ad-Din Tekish to aid him. The Khwarazmshah accepted this request and captured Ray in January 1193, followed by the Tabrak citadel after 2 day siege. Qutlugh Inanch was worried about Tekish's rising power, however, so he fled to the fortress of Sarjahan. Toghrul III responded by pledging to become a vassal, hand Ray over, and give his daughter's hand in marriage to a son of Tekish named Yunus-Khan, which Tekish accepted to counter Soltan-Shah's invasion of Khwarazm. Tekish quickly levied the kharaj on the newly captured territories, and had the khutba read in his name.

The next war Tekish had against the Seljuks occurred only later that year when Toghrul III broke the truce in March–April and recaptured both Ray and Tabrak by December 27, causing Qutlugh to flee to Zanjan and plea for aid from Tekish again. Toghrul decapitated the Khwarazmian garrison commander, Amir Tamghach and sent his head to Tekish, who was still fighting his brother in Khorasan. Tekish hastily departed from Khwarazm in early 1194 after wintering in Gurganj, reaching Ray with Qutlugh, who led an army to regroup in Khorasan. Toghrul III attacked the Khwarazmians on 4 March 1194, but was defeated and killed at the subsequent Battle of Rayy, that was a Khwarazmian victory. Toghrul's body was hanged at the Ray bazaar and his head sent to Baghdad where it was exhibited for several days at the Nubi gate.

== Conflict with al-Nasir ==
After the destruction of the Seljuks, the Khwarazmians conquered all of Persian Iraq including Hamadan, Ray, Isfahan, Saveh, Qom, among others by 25 June 1194. Isfahan was assigned to Qutlugh-Inanch, Hamadan to Amir Qaragoz, and Ray to Yunus-Khan with an assigned Atabeg named Mayachuq.

Initially, relations with al-Nasir were quite warm. He issued a manshur granting all of Persian Iraq as an iqta and sent various gifts to the Khwarazmshahid court, but he indicated an intention to expand his territories there. So, he sent a vizier, Ibn al-Qassab with an army of 10,000 Kurdish and Bedouin troops, who provided Tekish with royal garments and a deed assigning the land to him after meeting at the Asadabad Pass. al-Qassab then requested Tekish meet him at his horse in person with a small escort, but Tekish saw through this as an obvious trap and attacked his camp, defeating the Caliphal army.

The Arabs were chased as far as Dinavar and their camp looted, and Tekish pressed demands that the Sultan's Palace be rebuilt in Baghdad and Khwarazmian suzerainty over the Caliph be acknowledged in a similar way to that of the Buyids or Seljuks. Ibn al-Qassab did not relent and regrouped at the Hulwan Pass, while Tekish returned to Khwarazm in 1195, delegating the defense of Persian Iraq to the brother of incumbent Eldiguzid atabeg, Uzbek ibn Muhammad.

The Caliph's army did not stand idly as this happened. Qutlugh Inanch first defected to them, but Mayachuq defeated him near Zanjan and he fled to Hulwan where Ibn al-Qassam was. The two crossed the Zagros and attacked Hamadan via Kermanshah, capturing it and defeating a Khwarazmian force led by Mayachuq and Yunus-Khan. They advanced as far as Ray, which they captured, with the last troops of Tekish fleeing and dispersing to Damghan, Bistam, and Jurjan. Throughout Persian Iraq, Arab tribal forces began pillaging and massacring locals, while the Eldiguzid mamluk, Izz' ad-Din Gokcha captured Ray, Qom, Saveh and Kashan for himself, and his gains were recognized by al-Nasir in a manshur.

In late 1195, Isfahan and the rest of Persian Iraq fell to the Caliph under a commander named Sayf ad-Din Toghrul. However, Qutlugh Inanch, who hadn't received any land and realized the cynical motivations of the Arabs, revolted and sacked Ray with his army, before suffering a defeat to Ibn al-Qassab near Karaj and being forced into hiding. Tekish could only watch from Khwarazm, waiting for an opportunity to strike back.

Ibn al-Qassab died in July 1196, so Tekish and Mayachuq immediately marched to Persian Iraq alongside Uzbek ibn Muhammad, decisively defeating the Caliphate on July 15 near Hamadan, which surrendered on 18 July. Ibn al-Qassab's newly buried body was exhumed and then burned. All of Persian Iraq was soon re-occupied, and the marauding Arab contingents were executed at every opportunity. Gokcha was allowed to retain his territories as an Eldiguzid subject, while the rest of the territory was given to Uzbek ibn Muhammad, Yunus-Khan and Mayachuq to jointly govern. Yunus-Khan's wife and daughter of Toghrul III then deceived Qutlugh-Inanch by baiting him into a "peace talk" ruse and having him ambushed and killed.

== Wars with Ghurids & Qara Khitai ==
Tekish demanded to have the khutba read in his name in Baghdad, which al-Nasir predictably rejected, but no march against Baghdad was made due to that. The Caliph immediately began conspiring, telling Mayachuq to attack Hamadan and rebel. He agreed to this and was about to take the city on 8 June 1196, but was then assigned governorship over all of Persian Iraq by Tekish. However, Mayachuq deserted his post and began defiling the land.

Tekish was already back in Khwarazm where he had to contend with another enemy, being the Ghurids, who'd lost their proxy in Khorasan since Soltan-Shah's death in 1193. The Caliph consulted them in 1198, ordering Ghiyath al-Din Muhammad to invade and force Tekish to comply. The Ghurids captured Balkh and assigned Baha al-Din Sam to govern it, and Tekish appealed to the Qara Khitai to help him. A huge army of theirs was sent through Khorasan and toward the Amu Darya, so Ghiyath and his brother, Muizz al-Din Muhammad gathered their forces and they defeated the Qara Khitai.

Once the khan of the Qara Khitai found this out, he blamed the defeat on Tekish, who had embarked from Tus to besiege Herat, ordering him to compensate by sending 10,000 dinars for each 12,000 Qara Khitai nomads which died in the debacle. Tekish refused, and declared his full sovereignty over his land and independence from him, and made peace with the Ghurids and the Caliph. The Qara Khitai responded by dispatching another large and well-equipped army, this time towards Gurganj. Tekish fought with his troops in the city, attacking outside the walls and inflicting enough casualties to force their withdrawal. Tekish retaliated by besieging Bukhara, which fell after a few days of warfare. Despite having captured the city a few days later, Tekish spared the population, but withdrew soon after and did not try to permanently control Bukhara.

== Final years & campaigns (Isma'ilis, Bavandids) ==
In January 1199, Tekish arrived at Rayy to finally dispose of Mayachuq. Most of his soldiers talked their way out of fighting and rejoined his ranks, but Mayachuq and his closest supporters locked themselves in the fortress of Ardahn in Mazandaran. Thereby, Tekish stormed it and executed Mayachuq and his associates. A diplomatic embassy under Tekish's nephew, Sayf ad-Din, also arrived at Baghdad in November 1198 and re-affirmed relations with the Caliph, receiving a robe of honor that was handed to Tekish.

Tekish continued attempting to subdue Western Iran, targeting the heretical Isma'ili Order of Assassins in 1199, capturing the fortress of Qahira/Arslan-Gushay after a 4-month siege, and then attacking their main stronghold in Alamut, but failing, despite heavily weakening the defenders. The Isma'ilis blamed this attack on a vizier of theirs, Ma'sud ibn 'Ali, executing him, which enraged Tekish, who sent his second-born (and now eldest, as Malik-Shah died in spring 1197), Qutb ad-Din Muhammad to attack the Nizari fort Turshiz. The subsequent siege took another four months, but the Isma'ilis agreed to pay 100,000 dinars and sign a truce.

Tekish then went on his last campaign in 1199, invading Bavandid land and capturing Firuzkuh, Ustunavand and Folul, forcing Ardashir to recognize these gains. Further raids were conducted as far as Sari and Amol, but they were fended off. Tekish then returned to Gurganj on 29 March 1200, assigning his son Taj ad-Din Ali' Shah as governor.

== Death ==
Sometime in 1199, Tekish fell ill, and after his last series of campaigns in Western Iran, he returned to Gurganj where he designated Qutb ad-Din Muhammad as his heir. He had a sepulchre erected for himself in Gurganj, at the Sultan Tekesh Mausoleum where his remains are today. Tekish planned a final campaign against the Caliph, departing from Khwarazm in the last weeks of his life, but he died on 3 July 1200 of a peritonsillar abscess.

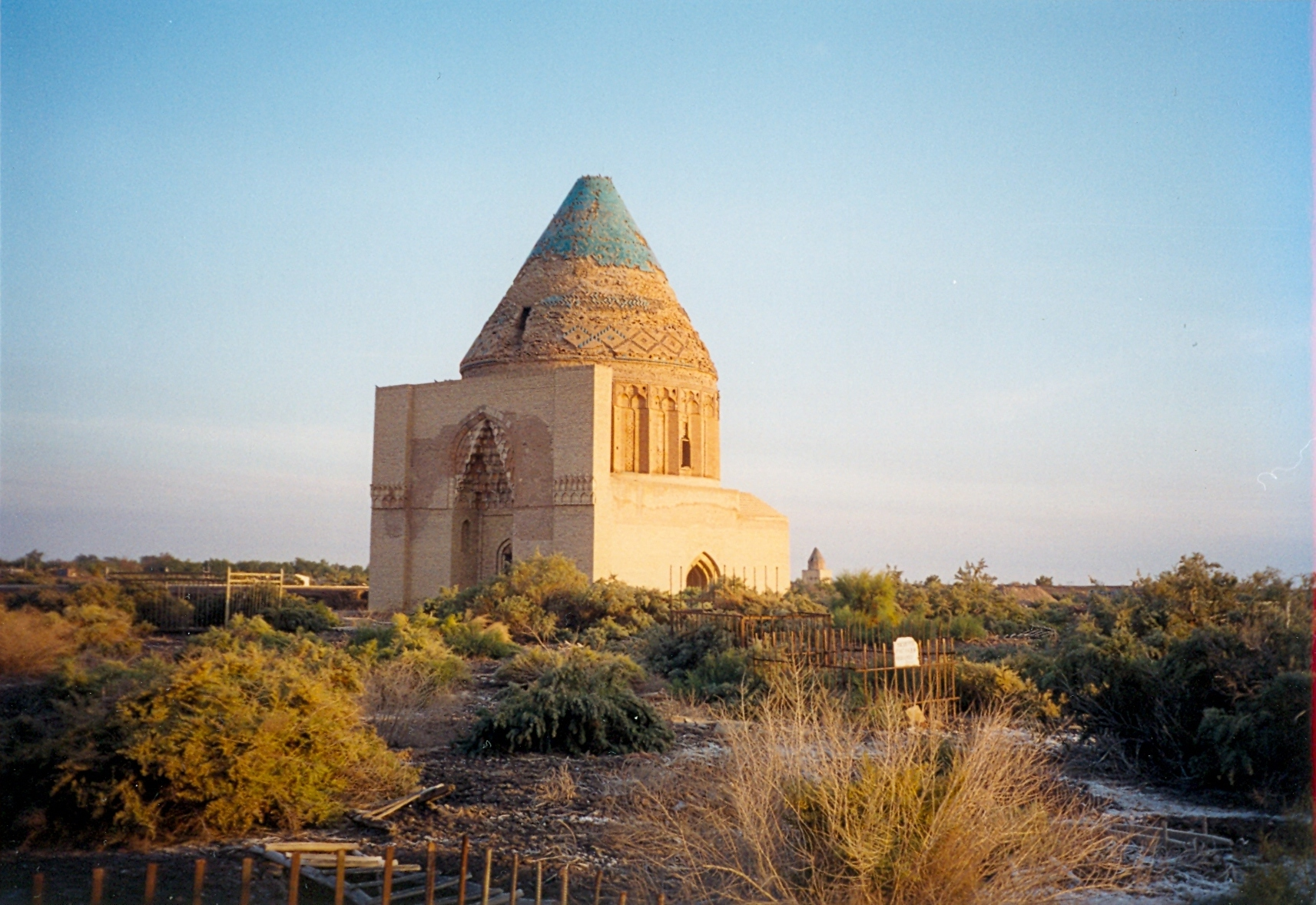
Sultan Tekesh Mausoleum, burial place of Ala ad-Din Tekish located in Konye-Urgench

The poet Zahir ad-Din al-Faryabi wrote about his march on Baghdad:

Oh, shah! As soon as Persian Iraq would be conquered on your order, Send your troops and capture the town where ashes of Prophet lie!

They destroy Ka'aba, burn its veil and disperse like dust, this holy place!

Why is it veil for Ka'aba? Let it say in the treasury, and sent two-three beddings to the temple.

Burn the faithful down, and raise men of science up to mountain peaks! When you turn into non-believer, Go to Balkh and send a caliph's head to the Qara-Khitay!

== Legacy ==
Ala ad-Din Tekish (r. 1172–1200) left behind an organized, and well-equipped army of Qipchaq, Qangli and Uran Turkic troops, including mercenaries from various other steppes tribes through his strategic marriage with Terken Khatun. He greatly augmented the power of the Khwarazmian state and laid the foundations for its expansion and zenith under his successors, Ala ad-Din Muhammad, and Jalal al-Din Mangburni.

== Personality ==
Tekish was reportedly witty, knowledgeable, and conscientous when ruling. A man once penned a letter to him in Urgench, saying: "As a Muslim, I am your brother! Give me part of your treasure!" and Tekish gave him 10 gold dinars, which he was satisfied with. Tekish then replied with: "If the rest of my brothers demand their share each, you'd not get these though!".

Contemporary civilians and officials reported that people were happy with the living conditions and tax rates under his rule, with a centralized and efficient administration that helped him conduct near constant campaigns across Central Asia and Iran. After his death, Terken Khatun assumed power in most respects of government, ruling over Tekish's immediate successor Muhammad II.

On his deathbed, Tekish had declared Qutb ad-Din Muhammad, who renamed himself to Ala ad-Din Muhammad his successor, and was pleased with his decision.

== Sources ==
- Bosworth, C. E. (1968). "The Political and Dynastic History of the Iranian World (A.D. 1000–1217)". In Frye, R. N. (ed.). The Cambridge History of Iran, Volume 5: The Saljuq and Mongol periods. Cambridge: Cambridge University Press. pp. 1–202. ISBN 0-521-06936-X.
- Buniyatov, Z. M. (2015). ''A History of the Khorezmian State under the Anushteginids, 1097-1231''. Translated by Mustafayev, Shahin. Samarkand: IICAS. ISBN 978-9943-357-21-1.

Preceded by Il-Arslan	Shah of the Khwarezmian Empire; 11 December 1172 – 3 July 1200	Succeeded by Muhammad II
