= Umar (son of Miran Shah) =

Timurid prince (c. 1383 – 1407)

- Timurid prince
- Born: c. 1383
- Died: May 1407 (aged 23–24); Khurasan
- Wives: Payanda Biki (daughter of Amir Saif al-Din); La'l Bi Tuqmaq
- Issue: Yesugay; Bakhshayish; Sultan Badi' al-Jamal
- Dynasty: Timurid dynasty
- Father: Miran Shah
- Mother: Urun Sultan Khanika

Umar Mirza (c. 1383 – 1407) was a member of the Timurid dynasty and the grandson of its founder, the Central Asian conqueror Timur.

He took part in the internecine conflict which followed Timur's death, both to maintain control of his existing holdings, and potentially with the intent to claim the throne himself. He warred against his brother Abu Bakr and father Miran Shah, and ultimately died following an abortive rebellion against his uncle Shah Rukh.

== Background ==
Born around 1383, Umar was the fifth son of Miran Shah, himself the third son of Timur. His mother was the Mongol princess Urun Sultan Khanika, a daughter of Timur's puppet Khan Soyurgatmish.

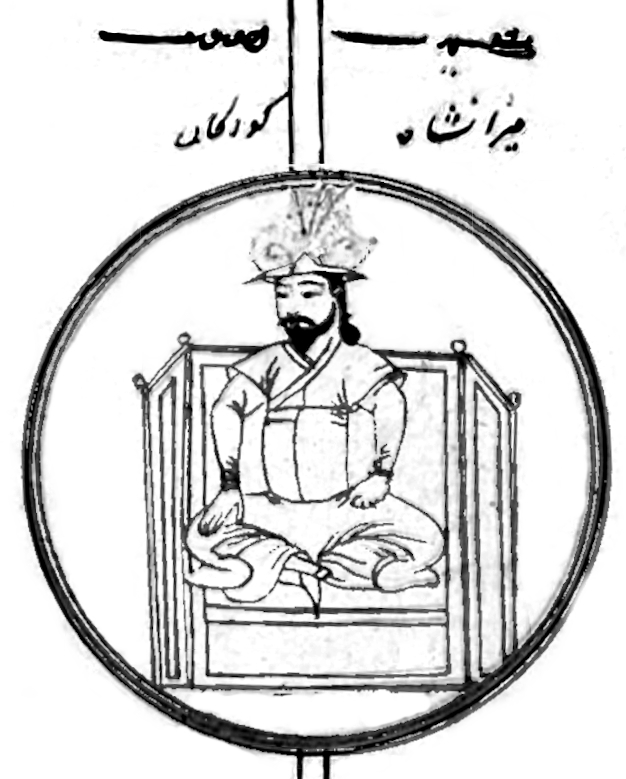
Contemporary portrait of Umar's father Miran Shah, commissioned in 1405-1409 by his son Khalil Sultan for an illustrated Timurid genealogy (TSMK, H2152).

Umar was active as a governor during his grandfather's lifetime. Following the death of Timur's heir apparent Muhammad Sultan in 1403, the empire's provinces were reorganised, with the lands of the former Ilkhanate being partitioned among the sons of Miran Shah. Umar, then aged about twenty, was assigned the western Iranian region of Azerbaijan. To him was also appointed one of Timur's most powerful amirs, Jahanshah bin Cheku, though the latter soon began to disagree with Umar due to a perceived lack of respect for Timur's ordinances.

== Timurid wars ==
Following Timur's death in February 1405, Umar and his brothers fought incessantly amongst themselves and with their father Miran Shah, as well as with neighbouring princes. Amirs migrated freely between them, and when the princes ran out of money for their troops, they were forced to reward them instead by allowing the plunder of their own provinces.

About a month after Timur's death, Jahanshah bin Cheku, having become increasingly estranged from Umar, rose up against him. While Umar was conferring with advisors in his tent, Jahanshah came to the door and killed some of those closest to the prince. However, finding himself outnumbered, Jahanshah fled, and was pursued and killed. Historian Beatrice Forbes Manz suggests that Jahanshah had been aspiring to rule Azerbaijan, either through Umar or in his own name.

Around this time, Umar's brother Abu Bakr, having lost his own province to Sultan Ahmad Jalayir, joined Umar in Azerbaijan alongside Miran Shah. However, the princes soon began to disagree, and Umar imprisoned Abu Bakr in Soltaniyeh and had his army plundered. However, Abu Bakr escaped, taking with him the city's treasury. Joining up in Khorasan with Miran Shah (who had withdrawn out of fear that Umar might imprison him also), both father and son then returned and captured Soltaniyeh. Umar, deserted by many amirs, retreated to Maragheh. There, he gathered a new army of Barlas, Suldus, and Turkmen soldiers. He headed to Tabriz with the intention of fortifying himself, though was denied entry by the population, who had too recently suffered from the extortion of Umar's officials.

On hearing of the approach of Abu Bakr, Umar went to Fars to solicit the aid of his cousins, Pir Muhammad, Rustam, and Iskandar, sons of the late Umar Shaikh. Together, they fought Abu Bakr and Miran Shah in April 1406, though were defeated. The beaten princes were pursued to Isfahan, held by Rustam, where they were unsuccessfully besieged by Abu Bakr.

The sons of Umar Shaikh subsequently withdrew to their own strongholds, while Umar sought refuge with his uncle Shah Rukh in Khorasan. Shah Rukh granted him the rule of Mazandaran, though, according to the Castilian ambassador Ruy de Clavijo, Umar harboured designs on the throne itself. He revolted within six months and was defeated by Shah Rukh in an engagement near Jam.

== Death ==
Umar retreated towards Transoxiana, possibly with the intention of displacing his brother Khalil Sultan from Samarqand. However, he was intercepted near the Murghab and, gravely wounded, was brought before Shah Rukh. The latter treated him kindly and had him dispatched to Herat for medical care. However, Umar died en route in May 1407.

== Bibliography ==
- Jackson, Peter (2023). From Genghis Khan to Tamerlane: The Reawakening of Mongol Asia. Yale University Press. ISBN 978-0-300-27504-9.
- Manz, Beatrice Forbes (1989). The Rise and Rule of Tamerlane. Cambridge University Press. ISBN 978-0-521-63384-0.
- Manz, Beatrice Forbes (2007). Power, Politics and Religion in Timurid Iran. Cambridge University Press. ISBN 978-1-139-46284-6.
- Woods, John E. (1990). The Timurid dynasty. Indiana University, Research Institute for Inner Asian Studies.
