= Ikhtiyar al-Din =

Ikhtiyar al-Din (Arabic: اختيار الدين Ikhtiyāru ’d-Dīn), meaning "appointed/ chosen of the Islamic religion/ faith/ creed". It may refer to:

- Ikhtiyar al-Din Ai-Taq (fl. 1161–1165), amir in western Khurasan following the decline of the Seljuks
- Ikhtiyar al-Din Hasan ibn Ghafras (died 1192), vizier of the Seljuk Sultan Kilij Arslan II
- Ikhtiyaruddin Ghazi Shah (fl. 1349–1352), sultan of Sonargaon
- Muhammad bin Bakhtiyar Khilji (died 1206), Afghan soldier
- Malik Ikhtiyaruddin Iuzbak (fl. 1251–1257), ruler of Bengal
- Ikhtiyar al-Din also known as Igder – architect to Kublai Khan
