= Boshaq Atema =

Fakhr al-Dīn Abū Isḥāq Ḥallāj Shīrāzī (Persian: فخرالدین ابواسحاق حلاج شیرازی), better known by his pen name Bosḥāq Aṭʿema (Persian: بسحاق اطعمه; died 1423 or 1427), was a 14 and 15th-century Persian satirist and poet from Shiraz. Most his poetry is in Persian but he has poems in Kurdish and Luri as well.

He is celebrated for creating a novel genre of gastronomic parody in Persian literature, using culinary vocabulary, food terminology, and recipes to satirize classical romantic, moral, and mystical Sufi themes.

== Biography ==
Bosḥāq was born in Shiraz, likely during the second half of the 14th century. His title Ḥallāj (cotton carder), along with an anecdote recorded by the biographer Dawlatshah Samarqandi, indicates that he worked as a cotton carder by profession before gaining recognition for his poetry.

Bosḥāq lived in Shiraz during a period when the city was a major cultural center of Iran. Given that he spent his early adult life in Shiraz while the lyric poet Hafez (d. 1390) was active there. Bosḥāq died in Shiraz in either 827 AH (1423 CE) or 830 AH (1427 CE), where his tomb was preserved.

== Poetry ==
His poetry is mostly about food and expressed using Persian classical vocabulary heavily influenced by the Sufi discourse. He wrote parodies on the works of his contemporary or earlier classical poets like Hafez. There are numerous manuscripts of Boshaq's poetry around the world. His Diwan was printed in the 20th century in several places including Istanbul and Isfahan.

== Legacy ==
Bosḥāq's culinary satire inspired subsequent Persian poets. His younger contemporary Aḥmad Aṭʿema (d. 1446) continued writing culinary verse, while the 15th-century poet Neẓām al-Dīn Maḥmūd Qārī Yazdī adapted Bosḥāq's concept by using clothing and textile terminology instead of food.
