= Rashid al-Din Vatvat =

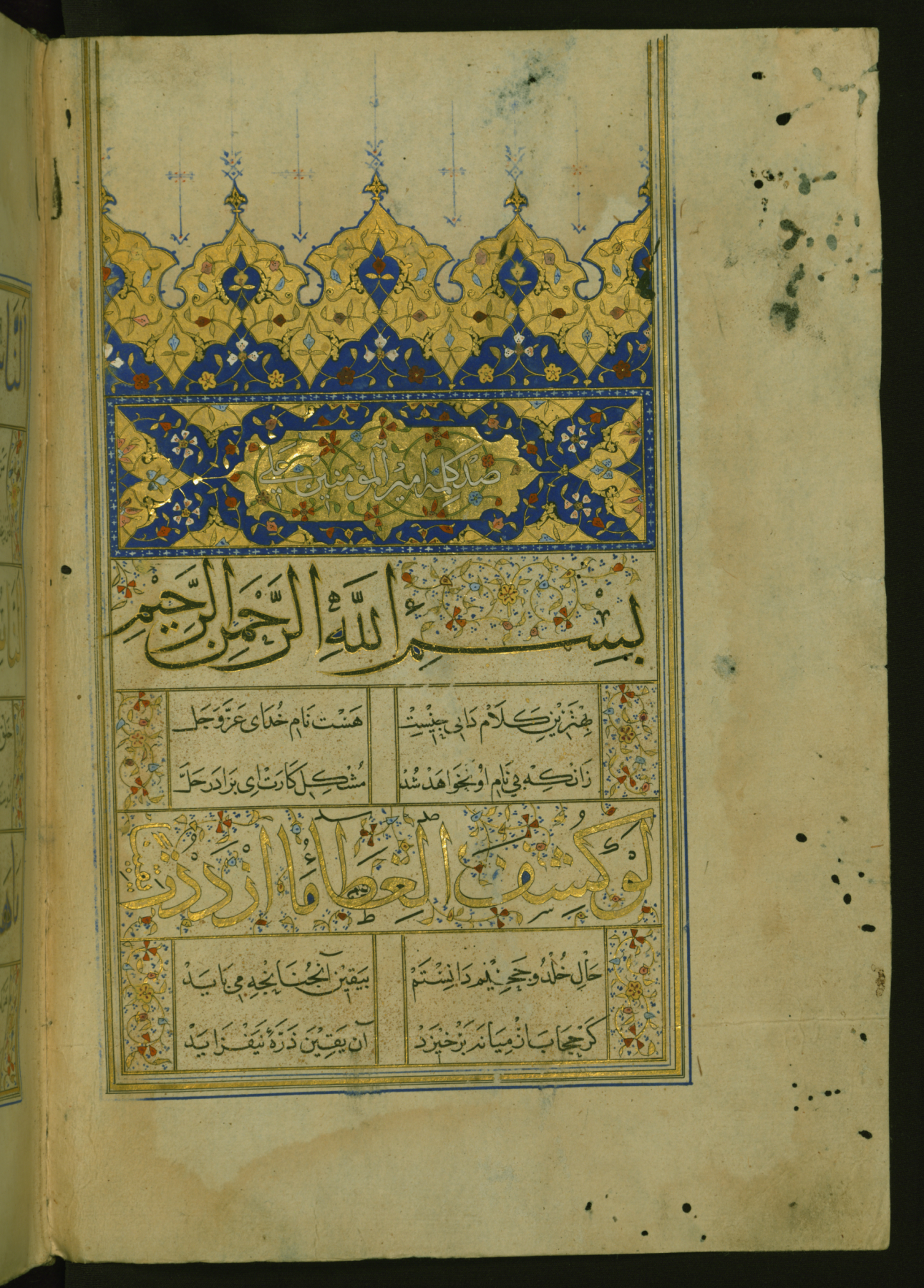
- Incipit page of One Hundred Sayings by Ali Rashid al-Din Vatvat
- Born: c. 1088/9; Balkh or Bukhara
- Died: 1182/3 (aged 97); Khwarazm
- Occupations: Secretary, poet, philologist

Rashid al-Din Muhammad ibn Muhammad ibn Abd Jalil al-Umari (Persian: رشیدالدین محمد بن محمد بن عبد جلیل العمری; 1088/9 – 1182/3), better known by his nickname of Vatvat (وطواط; "the swallow"), was a secretary, poet, philologist in the Khwarazmian Empire. In addition to being a prolific author in Arabic and Persian, he also occupied high-ranking offices, serving as the chief secretary and propagandist under the Khwarazmshahs Atsiz (r. 1127/8–1156) and Il-Arslan (r. 1156–1172).

Although Vatvat spent most of his life in the Khwarazmian capital of Gurganj, he was himself a native of Balkh or Bukhara. He mainly composed panegyric qasidehs, but his rhetorical work Hada'iq al-sihr fi daqa'iq al-shi'r ("Gardens of Magic in the Subtleties of Poetry") is in prose.

== Biography ==
Vatvat was born in 1088/9 in either the city of Balkh or Bukhara, to a Sunni Persian family, which traced it's descent from the second Caliph Omar (r. 634–644). Vatvat was educated at a Nizamiyya madrasa in Balkh, where he became well-read in the Arabic philological tradition. There he became a katib (scribe) by craft, and moved to the Central Asian region of Khwarazm, where he remained the rest of his life under the service of the ruling Khwarazmshahs. There Vatvat distinguished himself as a court poet, and as a result was given the post of sahib divan al-insha (chief secretary) by Khwarazmshah Atsiz (r. 1127/8–1156), which he retained under the latter's son and successor, Il-Arslan (r. 1156–1172). Under the two Khwarazmshahs, Vatvat also served as a propagandist, circulating rumours that the Seljuk Empire was near its end, and the Khwarazmshahs were in the ascendancy. Vatvat's loyalty towards Atsiz earned him the hostility of the latter's overlord, the Seljuk ruler Ahmad Sanjar (r. 1118–1157), who at one point was determined to have Vatvat cut into 30 pieces, but was talked out of it by his chief secretary Muntajab al-Din Juvayni. Vatvat died in 1182/3 in Khwarazm at the age of 97.

== Personality ==
According to 15th-century biographer Dawlatshah Samarqandi, he was given the nickname "Vatvat" (the swallow) due to his small size and eloquent words. Several poets and courtiers disliked him due to his bad temper, which led to them mocking him at court meetings for his small size and baldness. Vatvat successfully defended himself against these taunts with his rhetorical skills.

== Works ==
The divan of Vatvat, written in Persian, contains 8,500 verses, mainly panegyric qasidas often dedicated to Atsiz. Due to his position as a poet laureate of the court, Vatvat was in extensive poetic correspondence with the leading poets of his time, such as Khaqani, Adib Sabir, and Anvari, who all praised him. Vatvat also praised them (particularly Adib Sabir) in his poems, but his panegyrics were often written in a satirical way, either due to the change in political climate or because of his notably bad temper.

== Sources ==
- Bosworth, C. E. (1968). "The Political and Dynastic History of the Iranian World (A.D. 1000–1217)". In Boyle, John Andrew (ed.). The Cambridge History of Iran: The Saljuq and Mongol Periods. Vol. 5. Cambridge: Cambridge University Press. pp. 1–202. ISBN 0-521-06936-X.
- Bosworth, C. E. (1987). "Atsïz Ḡaṛčaʾī". In Yarshater, Ehsan (ed.). Encyclopædia Iranica. Vol. III/1: Ātaš–Awāʾel al-Maqālāt. London and New York: Routledge & Kegan Paul. pp. 18–19. ISBN 978-0-71009-113-0.
- Bosworth, Clifford Edmund (2008). "Khwarazmshahs i. Descendants of the line of Anuštigin". In Yarshater, Ehsan (ed.). Encyclopædia Iranica. Vol. XIV: Isfahan IX–Jobbāʾi. London and New York: Routledge & Kegan Paul. ISBN 978-1-934283-08-0.
- de Blois, F.C (1995). "Ras̲h̲īd al-Dīn Muḥammad b. Muḥammad b. ʿAbd D̲j̲alīl al-ʿUmarī, known as Waṭwāṭ". In Bosworth, C. E.; van Donzel, E.; Heinrichs, W. P. & Lecomte, G. (eds.). The Encyclopaedia of Islam, Second Edition. Volume VIII: Ned–Sam. Leiden: E. J. Brill. pp. 444–445. ISBN 978-90-04-09834-3.
- Chalisova, Natalia (2000). "Waṭwāṭ, Rašid-al-Din". Encyclopædia Iranica, online edition. New York.
- Morgan, David; Stewart, Sarah, eds. (2017). The Coming of the Mongols. Bloomsbury Publishing. ISBN 978-1788312851.
- Rypka, Jan (1968). "Poets and Prose Writers of the Late Seljuq and Mongol Periods". In Boyle, John Andrew (ed.). The Cambridge History of Iran: The Saljuq and Mongol Periods. Vol. 5. Cambridge: Cambridge University Press. pp. 550–625. ISBN 0-521-06936-X.
