= Il-Arslan =

Khwarazm Shah from 1156 until 1172

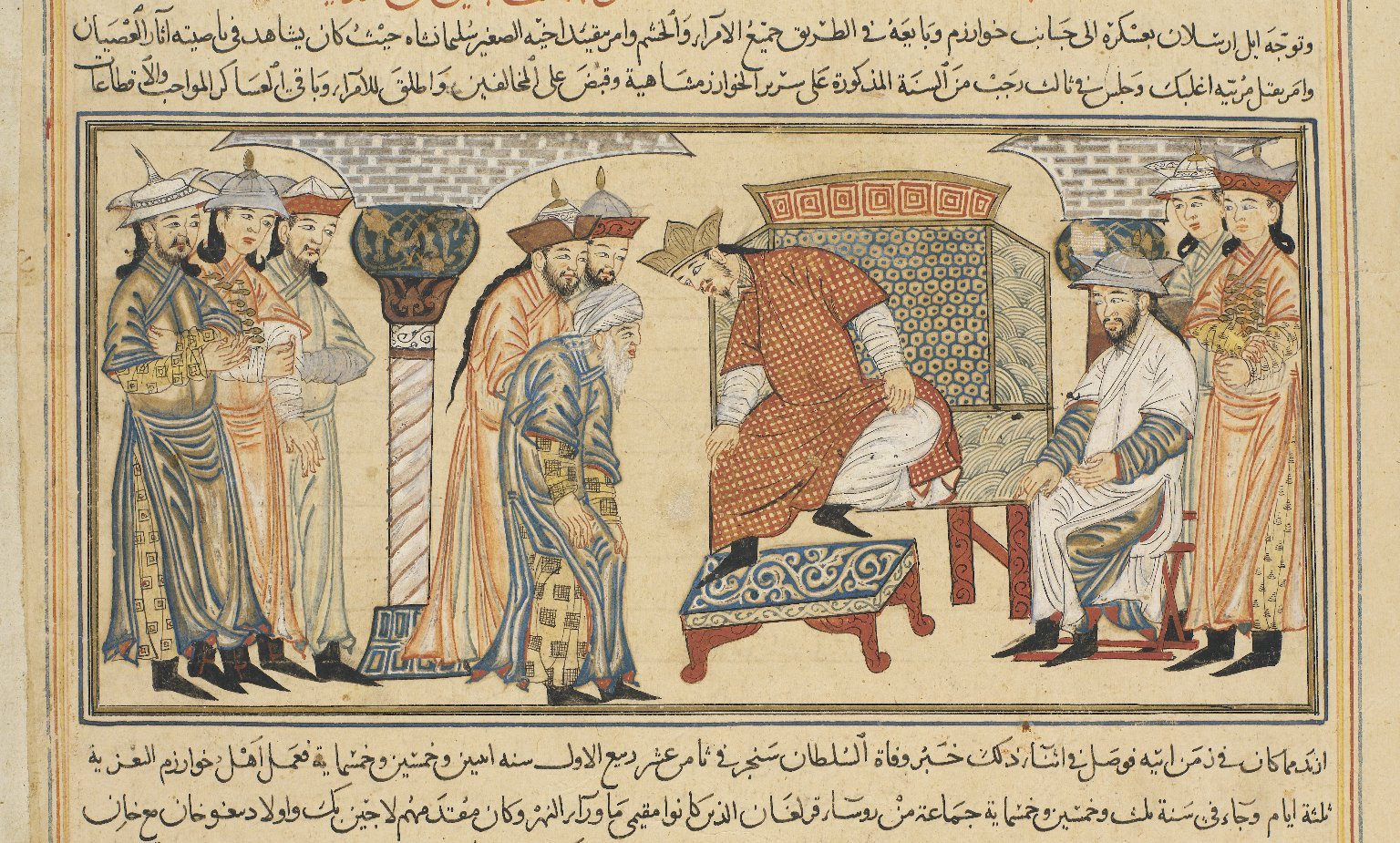
- Il-Arslan seated on his throne.

Khwarazmshah
- Reign: 22 August 1156 – 18 March 1172
- Predecessor: Atsiz
- Successor: Tekish and Sultan-Shah
- Died: 18 March 1172; Gurganj, Khwarazm
- Spouse: Terken Khatun
- Issue: Ala ad-Din Tekish; Jalal ad-Din Sultan-Shah
Names
- Laqab: Taj ad-Din (shortly); Kunya: Abul-Fath; Given name: Il-Arslan
- Dynasty: Anushtegin
- Father: Atsiz
- Religion: Sunni Islam

Il-Arslan ("The Lion") (full name: Taj ad-Dunya wa ad-Din Abul-Fath Il-Arslan ibn Atsiz, Persian: تاج الدین ابوالفتح ایل ارسلان بن اتسز) (died March 1172) was the Shah of Khwarezm from 1156 until 1172. He was the son of Atsïz. His rule began the successive period of constant territorial change for the Khwarazmians and was marked by victories over the Turks to his north, Seljuks, Eldiguzids of Azerbaijan and Qara Khitai.

== Reign ==
In 1152 Il-Arslan was made governor of Jand, an outpost on the Syr Darya which had recently been reconquered, by his father. In 1156 Atsïz died and Il-Arslan succeeded him as Khwarazm-Shah. Like his father, he decided to pay tribute to both the Seljuk sultan Sanjar and the Qara Khitai gurkhan.

Sanjar died only a few months after Il-Arslan's ascension, causing Seljuk Khurasan to descend into chaos. This allowed Il-Arslan to effectively break off Seljuk suzerainty, although he remained on friendly terms with Sanjar's successor, Mas'ud. They were alleged to have attempted to create a joint campaign against the Qara Khitai, but such an alliance never occurred. Like his father, Il-Arslan sought to expand his influence in Khurasan, and in the 1160s took an active interest in the area, acquiring the territories of Aybek in Dihistan in 1162-1163 as a vassal for protection against Mu'Ayyid Ay-Aba, the most significant Oghuz Turkoman who'd captured Nishapur.

In 1158 Il-Arslan became involved in the affairs of another Qara Khitai vassal state, the Karakhanids of Samarkand. The Karakhanid Chaghrï Khan had been persecuting the Qarluks in his realm, and several Qarluk leaders fled to Khwarazm and sought Il-Arslan's help. He responded by invading the Karakhnid dominions, taking Bukhara and besieging Samarkand, where Chaghrï Khan had taken refuge. The latter appealed to both the Turks of the Syr Darya and the Qara Khitai, and the gurkhan sent an army, but its commander hesitated to enter into conflict with the Khwarazmis. In the end a peace was mediated where Chaghrï Khan was forced to take back the Qarluk leaders and restore them to their former positions.

Later rule

Il-Arslan's interests again converged on Khorasan, with Ay-Aba growing in power having conquered Tus, Abivard, Shahristan, Bistam, Damghan, and Qumis. In 1165, he gathered his army and besieged Nishapur, but was soon forced to retreat. Ay-Aba then attacked Nasa in March 1165, but Il-Arslan arrived and forced him to flee, entering the town and annexing it from the iqta governor 'Umar ibn Hamza an-Nasawi and briefly pursuing Ay-Aba to Nishapur before turning back. A brief window of inaction occurred where Il-Arslan attacked Aybek and annexed Dihistan and Gorgan, adding it to his domain in 1165, with the latter fleeing to Ay-Aba, who appealed to the Atabek Ildeniz of Azerbaijan, who effectively ruled over sultan Arslan-Shah in Hamadan. A field battle occurred at Bistam in May 1167, but neither side won the engagement, and Ay-Aba fled Khorasan, allowing Il-Arslan to besiege and finally capture Nishapur. The khutba was read out loud in his name, and Ay-Aba returned shortly after, surrendering and agreeing to become il-Arslan's vassal. By this point, not only was Nishapur annexed, but all of Razavi Khorasan and most of Semnan were Khwarazmian vassals.

From 1167-1168, Il-Arslan continued to campaign further west, receiving the submission of Inanch, the ruler of Ray. The two advanced into the Savah Kuh, inflicting a defeat on Ildeniz and the Seljuks and besieging Tabrak, which failed, albeit did not hinder their advance. The offensive pressed into Azerbaijan where Abhar, Zanjan and Qazvin were conquered, while the surrounding regions were devastated and 2,000 thoroughbred camels were taken back to Khwarazm as loot. In 1168, these gains were proven ephemeral after Inanch was assassinated on the instigation of Ildeniz.

Downfall and death

In 1171 the Qara Khitai launched a punitive expedition against Il-Arslan, who had accepted Qarluq fugitives who were again being persecuted. The shah collected his army and moved on Amul but soon became sick and turned over his forces to one of his lieutenants, Amir' Ayyar Bek. The Khwarazmian army was defeated, however, with Ayyar Bek being captured and sent to Samarkand and Il-Arslan died shortly after fleeing to Gurganj on 18 March, 1172.

== Court life ==
Little is known about the court life at Gurganj under Il-Arslan. It was likely a continuation of the prospering milieu that had existed during his father's reign, with the secretary and poet Rashid al-Din Vatvat continuing to serve as the head of the chancery.

== Aftermath ==
Il-Arslan had two sons, Sultan-Shah and Ala ad-Din Tekish, the former of which, despite being younger, was the designated heir and was favoured by Il-Arslan's wife Terken Khatun. Tekish still had an ambition to assert his pretensions to the throne, and enlisted the support of the Qara Khitai, consequentially starting a decades-long period of civil strife.

== Sources ==
- Biran, Michael. The Empire of the Qara Khitai in Eurasian History: Between China and the Islamic World. Cambridge, UK: Cambridge University Press, 2005.
- Bosworth, C. Edmund (2004). "Il-Arslān". Encyclopædia Iranica, online edition, Vol. XII, Fasc. 6. New York. pp. 643–644.
- Boyle, J. A. . The Cambridge History of Iran Volume 5: The Saljuq and Mongol Periods. Cambridge, UK: Cambridge University Press, 1968.
- Buniyatov, Z. M. (2015). ''A History of the Khorezmian State under the Anushteginids, 1097-1231''. Translated by Mustafayev, Shahin. Samarkand: IICAS. ISBN 978-9943-357-21-1.

Preceded by Atsiz	Shah of Khwarezm; 1156–1172	Succeeded by Ala ad-Din Tekish
Preceded by Atsiz	Shah of Khwarezm; 1156–1172	Succeeded by Jalal ad-Din Sultan-Shah
