= Toghan-Shah =

Emir of Nishapur

Toghan-Shah Abu Bakr (died 1185 or 1186) was the emir of Nishapur from 1174 until his death. He was succeeded by his son, Sanjar-Shah.

== Biography ==
Toghan-Shah was the son of Mu'ayyid al-Din Ai-Aba and succeeded him in 1174 when the latter was captured and executed while fighting in Khwarezm. Trouble for him appeared with the arrival in Khurasan of the exiled Khwarezmshah Sultan Shah. With a contingent of Qara Khitai troops, Sultan Shah established a power base in Khurasan and soon turned on Toghan-Shah. The latter was incapable of withstanding Sultan Shah's attacks, and as a result he lost Tus to him in 1181.

For the rest of Toghan-Shah's reign he continued to suffer from Sultan Shah's raids. Attempts to enlist support against him from Tekish, the current Khwarezmshah, or from the Ghurids, who had given him a princess in marriage, were unsuccessful. In 1185 or 1186 he died and left his realm to his son, Sanjar-Shah.

== Notes ==
Preceded by Mu'ayyid al-Din Ai-Aba	Emir of Nishapur; 1174–1185/6	Succeeded by Sanjar-Shah
