= Timurid War of Succession =

1405–1409 conflict in the Timurid Empire

The Timurid War of Succession was a conflict fought from 1405 to 1409 that arose following the death of Timur, the supreme leader and founder of the Timurid Empire. The empire's lack of political structure or designation of proper succession law led to the empire's unity immediately collapsing following Timur's death.

Timur initially had chosen his grandson, Pir Muhammad, as the heir to the empire, though this choice did not go to plan. Many factions and local princes (amirs) vied for suzerainty over the vast realm throughout the conflict, though the two major opponents of Khalil Sultan and Shah Rukh were the most successful in enforcing their claim to the throne. The succession war eventually concluded with the capture of the imperial capital of Samarkand in 1409 by Shah Rukh, Timur's fourth son. Shah Rukh would rule until his death, upon which the Second Timurid War of Succession would break out.

== Background ==
The Turco-Mongol conqueror Timur led numerous campaigns throughout Asia and Eastern Europe throughout his life. From a base of control of the western Chagatai Khanate in 1370, he led military campaigns across Western, South, and Central Asia, the Caucasus, and Southern Russia, defeating in the process the Khans of the Golden Horde, the Mamluks of Egypt and Syria, the emerging Ottoman Empire, as well as the late Delhi Sultanate of India, becoming the most powerful ruler in the Muslim world. From these conquests, he founded the Timurid Empire.

== Conflict ==
Timur died while on a campaign against the Ming Empire on 17 February 1405, in Farab. Due to the lack of territorial cohesion and proper governance, the empire disintegrated into many small principalities following his death, but these would be close to reunited following the conclusion of the succession war.

Khalil Sultan proclaimed himself emperor at Tashkent soon after Timur's death and seized the royal treasury, as well as Timur's imperial capital Samarkand. Soon after, Sultan Husayn, the son of one of Timur's daughters, revoked his claim to the throne and joined his forces with Khalil Sultan. Shah Rukh marched his army out of Herat to the Oxus river but made no offensive move against his nephew at this point. This was likely due to Miran Shah, Khalil Sultan's father, who posed a serious threat as he, along with his other son Abu Bakr, had led an army out of Azerbaijan in support of the younger prince. They were both forced to withdraw prior to joining with Khalil Sultan however, due to invasions to their rear by the Jalayirids and the Qara Qoyunlu, who took advantage of the death of the old emperor to seize territory. Miran Shah was killed in battle in 1408 whilst attempting to repel the invaders, with Abu Bakr dying similarly the year after.

On 13 May 1409, Shah Rukh would capture Samarkand, his home city, and instate Ulugh Beg, his eldest son, as governor of Transoxiana with little bloodshed.

== Sources ==
- Jackson, Peter; Lockhart, Lawrence (1986). The Cambridge History of Iran. Vol. VI. Cambridge University Press. pp. 98–145. ISBN 978-0-521-20094-3.
