= Sanjar =

Sanjar may refer to:

== People ==
- Ahmad Sanjar, Seljuk sultan
- Sultan Sanjar Mirza, Timurid sultan
- Jam Sanjar, Samma sultan
- Sanjar al-Jawli, Mamluk governor of Palestine
- Sanjar-Shah, Khwarezmian governor of Khurasan
- Malik Sanjar, Delhi Sultanate general
- Sanjar Umarov, Uzbek politician
- Sanjar Tursunov (boxer), Uzbek boxer
- Sanjar Kuvvatov, Uzbek footballer
- Sanjar Zokirov, Uzbek judoka
- Sanjar Shaakhmedov, Uzbek footballer
- Sanjar Fayziev, Uzbek tennis player
- Sanjar Kodirkulov, Uzbek footballer
- Sanjar Asfendiyarov, Kazakh politician
- Sanjar Boqaev, Kazakh politician
- Alok Sanjar, Indian politician

== Places ==
- Sanjar Chang, village in Pakistan
- Sanjar, Iran, village in Iran
- Kalateh-ye Sanjar, village in Iran
- Sanjar Bazar Taradan, village in Iran
- Bazar Ahmad Sanjar, village in Iran
- Gowmazi Sanjar, village in Iran
- Garhi Sanjar Khan, village in India
- Plain of Sanjar, region in Iraq

== See also ==
- Sanjar Tursunov
