= Abu Bakr Mirza (Timurid) =

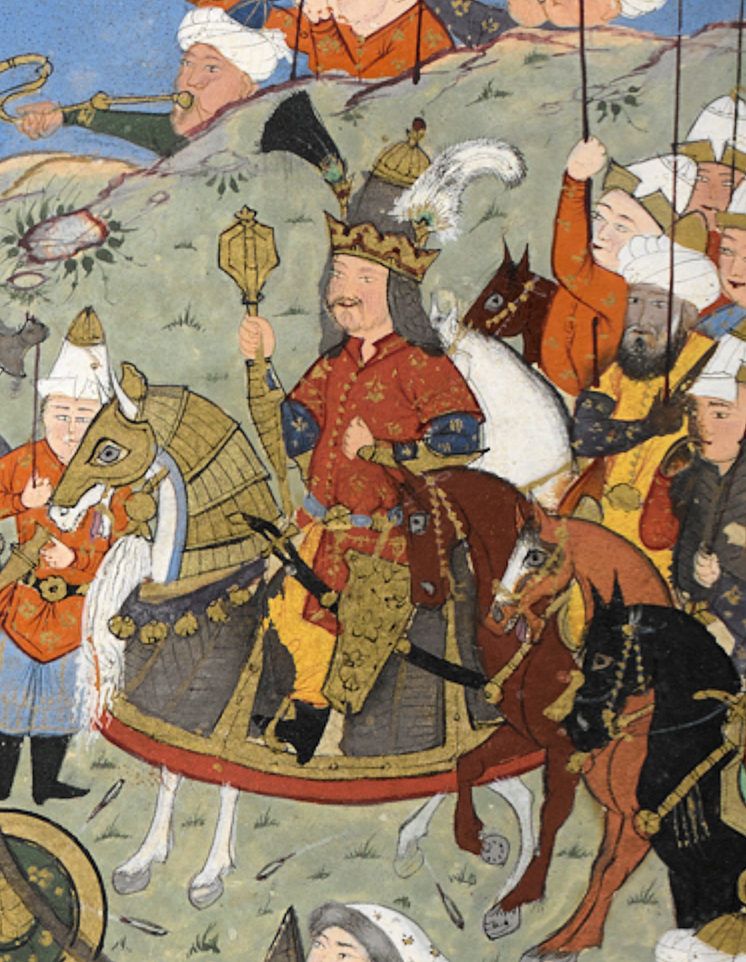
Abu Bakr Mirza leading Timurid troops against the Qara Qoyunlu at the Battle of Nakhchivan (1406). Rawzat as-Safa (1599)

Abu Bakr Mirza ibn Miran Shah (1382–1408), was governor of Tabriz, and son of the Timurid governor and pretender to the throne Miran Shah.

In 1403 he married Öruz Hatun, daughter of the Ottoman Sultan Bayezid I, who had just been vanquished at the 1402 Battle of Ankara, with his Serbian princess Olivera Despina Lazarevic. Abu Bakr Mirza and Öruz Hatun had at least a child, a daughter, Aisha.

After the death of Timur in 1405, the Timurid princes fought with each other for supremacy. Abu Bakr Mirza fought his brother Mirza Umar who had been in charge of Tabriz since 1403–04.

On October 1406, Qara Yusuf, ruler of the Qara Qoyunlu, defeated Abu Bakr Mirza, at the Battle of Nakhchivan (1406), taking back control of Tabriz. He advanced as far as Sultaniyya, taking the population of this town to Tabriz, Ardabil and Maragha. Abu Bakr Mirza soon returned, but Qara Yusuf defeated him at Sardarud, south of Tabriz, where Miran Shah also fell in battle. Qara Yusuf then occupied Tabriz.

Abu Bakr Mirza soon died in 1408.

== Sources ==
- Bosworth, C. Edmund (31 August 2007). Historic Cities of the Islamic World. BRILL. ISBN 978-90-474-2383-6.
