= Terken Khatun (wife of Il-Arslan) =

Consort of the Shah of Khwarezm
- Tenure: 1156 – 1172
- Spouse: Il-Arslan
- Issue: Tekish; Sultan-Shah
Names
- Terken
- House: Anushtegin (by marriage)
- Religion: Islam

Terken Khatun was the Empress of the Khwarazmian Empire as the wife of Shah Il-Arslan, and the mother of Tekish and Sultan-Shah of the Khwarazmian Empire.

== Politically influence ==
After the death of her husband, Shah Il-Arslan, his sons began fighting over who would succeed him. Sultan Shah was the younger son, but he was considered the formal heir and she placed him on the throne. The elder son, Tekish, fled to the Qara Khitai and was given a large army, and he soon set off for Khwarazm. She and her son decided to flee, and Tekish installed himself in Khwarazm unopposed in December 1172, but she gained the support of Mu'ayyad al-Din Ai-Aba, a former Seljuk Amir who had set himself up in Nishapur since the collapse of Seljuk power there, he led an army into Khwarazm, but was defeated, captured and executed. Her son eventually found refuge with the Ghurids, but she was hunted down and killed by Tekish's forces.
