= Dawlatshah Samarqandi =

Poet and biographer

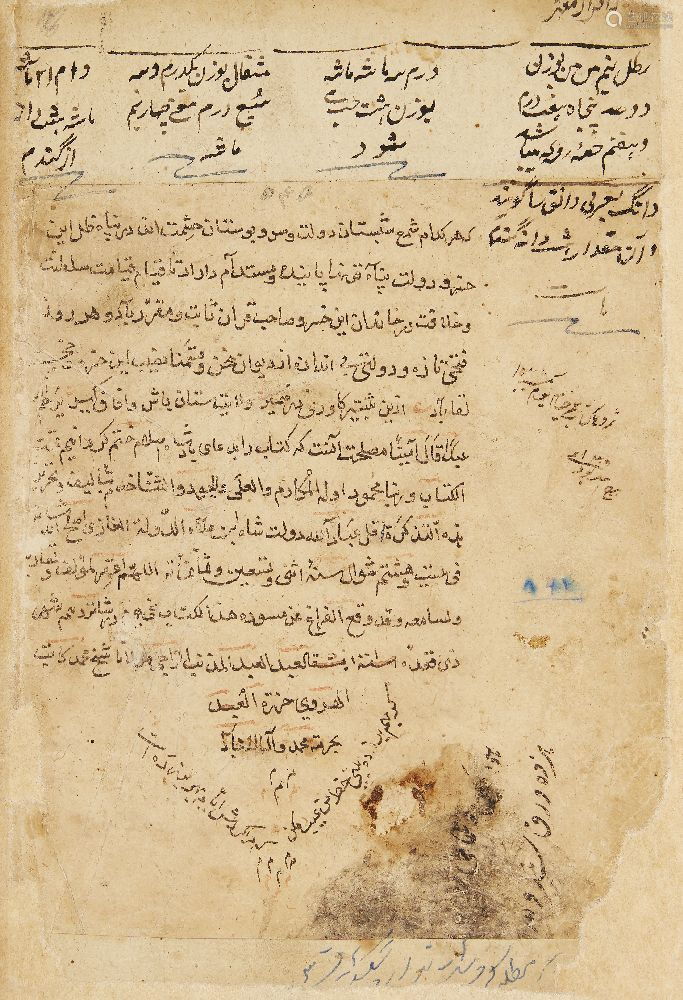
- Folio of the Tadhkirat al-shu'ara by Dawlatshah Samarqandi
- Born: c. 1438
- Died: 1494/1507
- Occupation: Poet, biographer
- Notable works: Tadhkirat al-shu'ara
- Relatives: Amir Ala al-Dawla Bukhtishah (father); Amir Radi al-Din Ali (brother); Amir Firuzshah (cousin)

Dawlatshah Samarqandi (Note: Also transliterated as Daulatshah and Dowlatshah.) (Persian: دولتشاه سمرقندی; c. 1438 – 1494/1507) was a poet and biographer active under the Timurid Empire. He is principally known for composing the Tadhkirat al-shu'ara ("Memorial of poets"), a Persian biographical dictionary of 152 poets, considered highly important for its information about the cultural and political history of Iran and Transoxania under Timurid rule.

== Life ==
A member of the elite of the Timurid Empire, Dawlatshah was born in 1438. He was the son of Amir Ala al-Dawla Bukhtishah, who served under the Timurid ruler Shah Rukh (r. 1405–1407). Dawlatshah was the cousin of Amir Firuzshah (died 1444), whose family had received the governorship of Isfahan following the death of the Timurid prince Rustam Mirza in 1423–1425.

Dawlatshah had a brother named Amir Radi al-Din Ali, who served under the Timurid prince Abul-Qasim Babur Mirza and composed poems in Persian and Chagatai Turkic. Dawlatshah also wrote poetry and was occasionally a companion of Sultan Husayn Bayqara (r. 1469–1506), but eventually retired and started living in a rural Sufi manner. In 1487, Dawlatshah completed his Tadhkirat al-shu'ara ("Memorial of poets"), a Persian biographical dictionary of 152 poets. The only older existing work is the Lubab al-albab of Awfi (died 1242), which Dawlatshah did not know about.

Dawlatshah's death date is uncertain; Haji Khalifa and Ismail Pasha Baghdadi report that he died in 1507, while Mohammad-Ali Borhanpuri puts his death date in 1494.

== Tadhkirat al-shu'ara ==
=== Contents ===
The Tadhkirat al-shu'ara of Dawlatshah is written in a fluid Persian prose, has an autobiographical preface, an introduction that discusses ten Arab poets (such as Labid, died 661, al-Mutanabbi, died 965, and al-Ma'arri, died 1058), seven chapters or stages that are equivalent to the seven celestial spheres, and an epilogue that highly praises seven contemporary litterateurs that Dawlatshah considers to be as great as Abdallah Marvarid (died 1541). In the epilogue, Dawlatshah especially focused on Jami (died 1492) and Ali-Shir Nava'i (died 1501), the latter whom the work was dedicated to. It ends with a lengthy homage to Sultan Husayn Bayqara.

The first four chapters focus on 76 Persian poets that lived before the Timurid era, including figures such as Rudaki (died 940/41), Ferdowsi (died 1019/25), Saadi Shirazi (died 1291/92) and Ubayd Zakani (died 1369–1371). The last three chapters focus on 59 poets of the Timurid era.

In his work, Dawlatshah included sources such as the Chahar maqala of Nizami Aruzi (fl. 1157), the Hada'iq al-sihr of Rashid al-Din Vatvat (died 1182/83), the Tarikh-i Guzida of Hamdallah Mustawfi (died after 1339/40), and the now-lost Manaqib al-shu'ara of Abu Tahir Khatuni (fl. 11th-century), the latter which was the first Persian work of the same type.

=== Assessment and publications ===
The book is notable for its inaccurate reports of earlier poets, (Note: The Iranologist Zabihollah Safa also commented on this; "the earlier the poet, the more frequent are the errors and flaws.") but its reports of more contemporary figures and events are considered highly important, particularly for the cultural and political history of Iran and Transoxania under Timurid rule (1370–1507). While Dawlatshah focuses more on eastern poets, he also gives information about western cities such as Shiraz and Isfahan.

In the middle of the 16th-century, the Tadhkirat al-shu'ara was translated into Ottoman Turkish. A second and shortened Turkish translation was made by Solayman Fahmi in 1843, titled Safinat al-sho'ara. In 1977, a modern Turkish version in four volumes was published by Necati Lugal published in Istanbul. In 1818, a German version was published by Joseph von Hammer-Purgstall in Vienna.

An edition of the Tadhkirat al-shu'ara was published by an unknown editor in Bombay in 1887, another by Edward Granville Browne in Leiden and London in 1901, and by Mohammad Ramazani in Tehran in 1959. The edition published by Edward G. Browne was based mostly on three manuscripts and the Bombay edition, and remains the most commonly distributed version. According to the modern historian Matthew Melvin-Koushki, Browne's edition "lacks a critical apparatus." He adds that this is included in the 2006 edition published by Fatima Alaqa in Tehran, which was based on nine more manuscripts.

According to the Iranologist Abbas Amanat, the book is to an extent a demonstration of the awareness of a shared cultural heritage amongst pre-modern authors, before the conceptualization of the Persianate world as a linguistic and cultural space.

== Sources ==
- Amanat, Abbas (2019). "Remembering the Persianate". In Amanat, Abbas; Ashraf, Assef (eds.). The Persianate World: Rethinking a Shared Sphere. Brill. pp. 15–62. ISBN 978-90-04-38728-7.
- Manz, Beatrice Forbes (2007). Power, Politics and Religion in Timurid Iran. Cambridge University Press. ISBN 978-1-139-46284-6.
- Melvin-Koushki, Matthew (2017). "Dawlatshāh Samarqandī". In Fleet, Kate; Krämer, Gudrun; Matringe, Denis; Nawas, John; Rowson, Everett (eds.). Encyclopaedia of Islam (3rd ed.). Brill Online. ISSN 1873-9830.
- Safa, Dhabih-Allah (1994). "Dawlatšāh Samarqandī". In Yarshater, Ehsan (ed.). Encyclopædia Iranica. Vol. VII/2: Dastūr al-Afāżel–Dehqān I. London and New York: Routledge & Kegan Paul. pp. 149–150. ISBN 978-1-56859-020-2.
- Subtelny, Maria (2007). Timurids in Transition: Turko-Persian Politics and Acculturation in Medieval Iran. Brill. ISBN 978-90-04-16031-6.
