= Battle of Nakhchivan (1406) =

Battle for control of Azerbaijan

- Part of Timurid Invasion of Azerbaijan
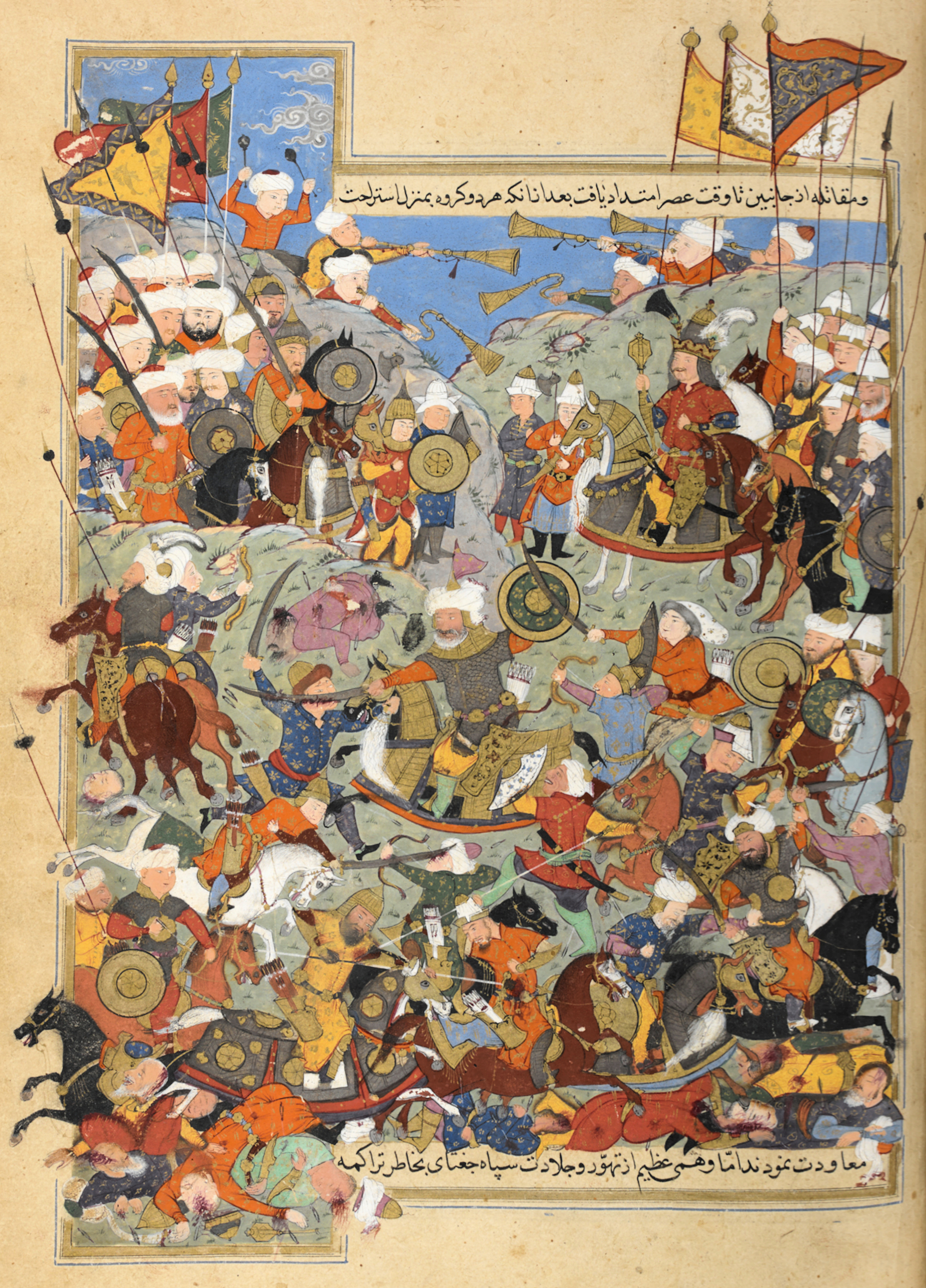
- Battle between the armies of Abu Bakr of Tabriz, son of Miranshah, and Qara Yusuf Qaraqoyunlu. Mirkhvand's Rawzat al-Safa (1599)
Date	October 14, 1406
Location	Nakhchivan near Aras River, modern Azerbaijan
Result	Qara Qoyunlu victory

Belligerents
Qara Qoyunlu	Timurid Empire

Commanders and leaders
Abu Nasr Qara Yusuf; Ispend bin Yusuf	Abu Bakr Mirza

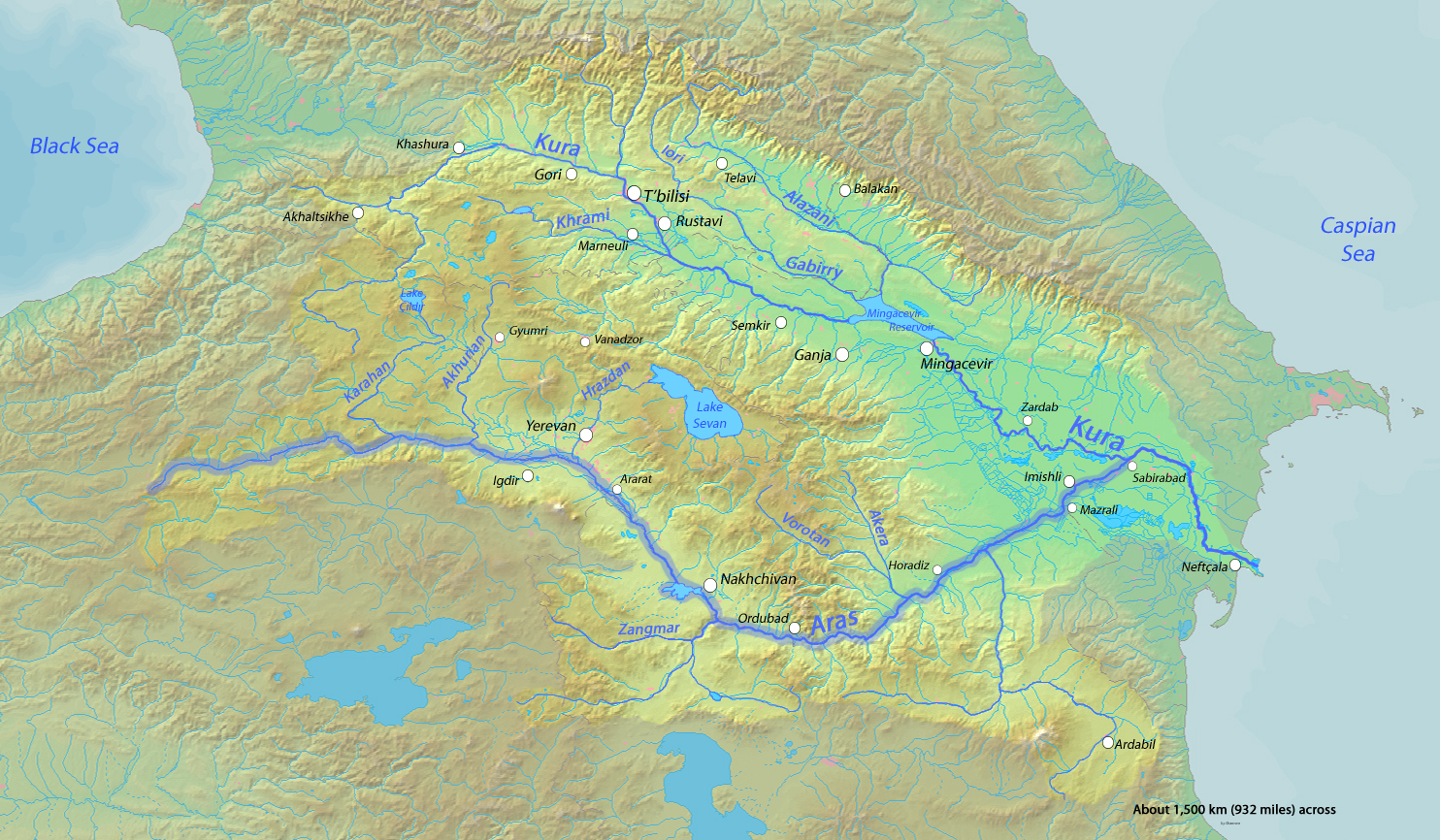
Map of Nakhchivan city near River Aras.

The Battle of Nakhchivan (Persian: نبرد نخجوان) was fought between Kara Koyunlu under their Bey, Qara Yusuf and the Timurid Empire under the leadership of Timur's grandson Abu Bakr Mirza ibn Miran Shah, for control of Azerbaijan on October 14, 1406. Qara Yusuf decisively defeated the Timurids in this battle and took over Tabriz, the capital of the region.

== Background ==
After Khalil Sultan became king of the Timurid Empire, his brother, Abu Bakr ibn Miran Shah returned with his army to Azerbaijan and expelled the forces of Sultan Ahmed Jalayir from Tabriz. Sultan Ahmed went to Aujan and after a consultation with Aujan's local ruler, he determined to return to Baghdad.

Because Abu Bakr forces can not got into Tabriz, he went to Nakhchivan and summoned Malik Izuddin from Kurdistan, before they jointly agreed to attack the forces of Kara Koyunlu under Qara Yusuf.

== Battle ==
The battle between the belligerents was fought on the bank of Aras River on October 14, 1406 (1 Jumada al-awwal 809). Qara Yusuf side emerged victorious. The demoralised Abu Bakr's troops retreated and on their way back, they pillaged the city of Tabriz. This enraged notable Tabrizi which then invited Qara Yusuf to their city. Meanwhile, Abu Bakr's side continued their retreat to Sultania and passed their time there during the winter.

== Aftermath ==
As Abu Bakr's side was in Sultania, Tabriz fell into the grip of Qara Yusuf. The fall of Tabriz marked Qara Yusuf's as the undisputed master of Azerbaijan. In Tabriz, Qara Yusuf attracted some support against the rule of Timurid Empire, one of the supporter was Sultan Mu'tasim. After consolidating power, Qara Yusuf led the army to march into Sultania where forcefully captured and transferred Sultania's inhabitants to Tabriz, Maragha, and Erbil. On 21 April 1408 (24 Dhu al-Qadah 810), Abu Bakr was planning to launch a surprise attack towards Kara Koyunlu, but Qara Yusuf moved more quickly, then decisively defeated Abu Bakr forces in the Battle of Sardrud.

Qara Yusuf became a powerful ruler in the region and established his stronghold immediately by making alliances with other Turkmen tribes, such as with Bistam Jagir. He occupied Soltaniyeh, Ardabil, and Maragheh; and moved the population to Tabriz. This would allow Qara Yusuf to face a counterattack in 1408 by the Timurids who intended on retaking Azerbaijan but would be disappointed as they were defeated decisively. The alliances between Bistam and Qara Yusuf turned sour by 1412/1413. There is no clear explanation regarding the rift, but seems likely to be connected with a wider crisis of authority.
