= Bazar Ahmad Sanjar =

Bazar Ahmad Sanjar بازار احمد سنجر
- Village
- Country: Iran
- Province: Sistan and Baluchestan
- County: Chabahar
- Bakhsh: Central
- Rural District: Kambel-e Soleyman

Population (2006)
  - Total: 86
- Time zone: UTC+3:30 (IRST)
  - Summer (DST): UTC+4:30 (IRDT)

Bazar Ahmad Sanjar (Persian: بازار احمد سنجر, also Romanized as Bāzār Aḩmad Sanjar) is a village in Kambel-e Soleyman Rural District, in the Central District of Chabahar County, Sistan and Baluchestan Province, Iran. At the 2006 census, its population was 86, in 20 families.
