= Hada'iq al-sihr fi daqa'iq al-shi'r =

Hada'iq al-sihr fi daqa'iq al-shi'r (Persian: حدائق السحر فی دقائق الشعر; "Gardens of Magic in the Subtleties of Poetry") is a 12th-century Persian treatise on rhetoric composed by Rashid al-Din Vatvat, a high-ranking bureaucrat of the Khwarazmian Empire.

== Sources ==
- Chalisova, N. Y. (2002). "Ḥadāʾeq al-seḥr". In Yarshater, Ehsan (ed.). Encyclopædia Iranica. Vol. XI/4: Greece VIII–Hadith II. London and New York: Routledge & Kegan Paul. p. 435. ISBN 978-0-933273-66-5.
- Sadatsharifi, Farshid (2023). "Ḥadāʾiq al-siḥr fī daqāʾiq al-shiʿr". In Madelung, Wilferd; Daftary, Farhad (eds.). Encyclopaedia Islamica Online. Brill Online. ISSN 1875-9831.
