= Sultan Shah of Khwarazm =

Titular sultan of the Khwarazmian Empire from 1172 to 1193

Sultan-Shah
- Sultan

Titular sultan of the Khwarazmian Empire
- Reign: 1172–29 September 1193
- Predecessor: Il-Arslan
- Successor: Tekish
- Born: Khwarazmian Empire
- Died: 29 September 1193
- Dynasty: Anushtegin
- Father: Il-Arslan
- Mother: Terken Khatun
- Religion: Sunni Islam

Jalal-ud-Din Sultan-Shah, known as Sultan-Shah (died 29 September 1193) was a claimant to the title of Khwarazmshah from 1172 until his death. He was the son of Il-Arslan.

In 1172 Il-Arslan died and his sons began fighting over who would succeed him. Sultan Shah was the younger son, but he was considered the formal heir and his mother, Terken Khatun, placed him on the throne. The elder son, Ala ad-Din Tekish, fled to the Qara Khitai and asked for them to enthrone him in place of his brother, promising an annual tribute in exchange. He was given a large army, and he soon set off for Khwarazm.

Sultan Shah and his mother, upon hearing of Tekish's approach, decided to flee, and Tekish installed himself in Khwarazm unopposed in December 1172. Sultan Shah and Terken Khatun managed to gain the support of Mu'ayyid al-Din Ai-Aba, a former Seljuk amir who had set himself up in Nishapur since the collapse of Seljuk power there. In 1174 he led an army into Khwarazm, but was defeated, captured and executed by Tekish. Following Ai-Aba's death, Sultan Shah eventually found refuge with the Ghurids, but Terken Khatun was hunted down and killed by Tekish's forces.

In the late 1170s the Qara Khitai recalled Sultan Shah, who was still living in Ghurid territory. Tekish had become rebellious, refusing to pay tribute and killing Qara Khitai officials. Sultan Shah came out of exile and a Qara Khitai army was sent to reinstate him as Khwarazm Shah. Tekish managed to halt this offensive, however, by opening the dykes of the Amu Darya, flooding the enemy's path.

The bulk of the Qara Khitai army decided to return home, but Sultan Shah convinced its commander to leave a contingent of troops with him. With this force , he set of into Khurasan, still under the control of various Oghuz tribes and Seljuk amirs. He succeeded in overthrowing several local rulers, resulting in the conquest of Sarakhs, Tus and Merv by 1181. He also harassed the Ghurid territories around Badghis.

Over the next several years Sultan Shah remained a threat to Tekish, who was forced to conduct expeditions into Khurasan several times as a result. Despite this, Sultan Shah was unable to make any significant gains against his brother. He also had occasional problems with the Ghurids; in an 1189/1190 campaign, they invaded his territory, defeated him and took some of his possessions.

In 1192 Sultan Shah decided to launch an expedition against Khwarazm, taking advantage of Tekish's absence there; the latter was at the time in western Iran dealing with the Seljuks of Hamadan. While the campaign was underway, however, he died (1193) and Tekish seized some of his possessions, reuniting the Khwarazmid lands.

Preceded by Il-Arslan	Khwarazm Shah (in opposition to Tekish); 1172 – 29 September 1193	Succeeded by Ala ad-Din Tekish
