= Sanjar Bazar Taradan =

Sanjar Bazar Taradan سنجربازار ترادان
- Village
- Location within Iran
- Coordinates: 25°42′00″N 61°25′00″E
- Country: Iran
- Province: Sistan and Baluchestan
- County: Chabahar
- Bakhsh: Dashtiari
- Rural District: Bahu Kalat

Population (2006)
  - Total: 250
- Time zone: UTC+3:30 (IRST)
  - Summer (DST): UTC+4:30 (IRDT)

Sanjar Bazar Taradan (Persian: سنجربازار ترادان, also Romanized as Sanjar Bāzār Tarādān; also known as Dalvash Bāzār and Sanjar Bāzār) is a village in Bahu Kalat Rural District, Dashtiari District, Chabahar County, Sistan and Baluchestan Province, Iran. At the 2006 census, its population was 250, in 46 families.
