= Sanjar-Shah =

Sanjar-Shah was the amir of central Khurasan from 1185 or 1186 until 1187. His short reign was ended by a Khwarezmid invasion and resulted in the takeover of Nishapur by Khwarezm.

Sanjar-Shah succeeded his father Toghan-Shah after the latter's death in either 1185 or 1186, although his atabeg Mengli Beg held actual power. In 1186 the Khwarezmshah Tekish, having been informed on the instability in Khurasan, led an army south in 1186 and laid siege to Shadyakh, where Sanjar-Shah and Mengli Beg were residing (Shadyakh was a suburb of Nishapur, which had been Sanjar-Shah's father's capital, but which had been heavily damaged by Ghuzz raids). A second siege by Tekish's army in 1187 ended with the capture of Shadyakh and both Sanjar-Shah and his atabeg. Mengli Beg was executed, while Sanjar-Shah was carried off to Khwarezm; the government of Nishapur was given over to Tekish's son Malik-Shah. Despite this, Sanjar-Shah continued to collude with anti-Khwarezmid elements in Nishapur; in retaliation the shah ordered his blinding.

== Notes ==
Preceded by Toghan-Shah	Amir of Nishapur c. 1185/6–1187	Succeeded by Khwarezmid administration
