= Muhammad Sultan Mirza =

Timurid military commander (1375–1403)

- Timurid Prince
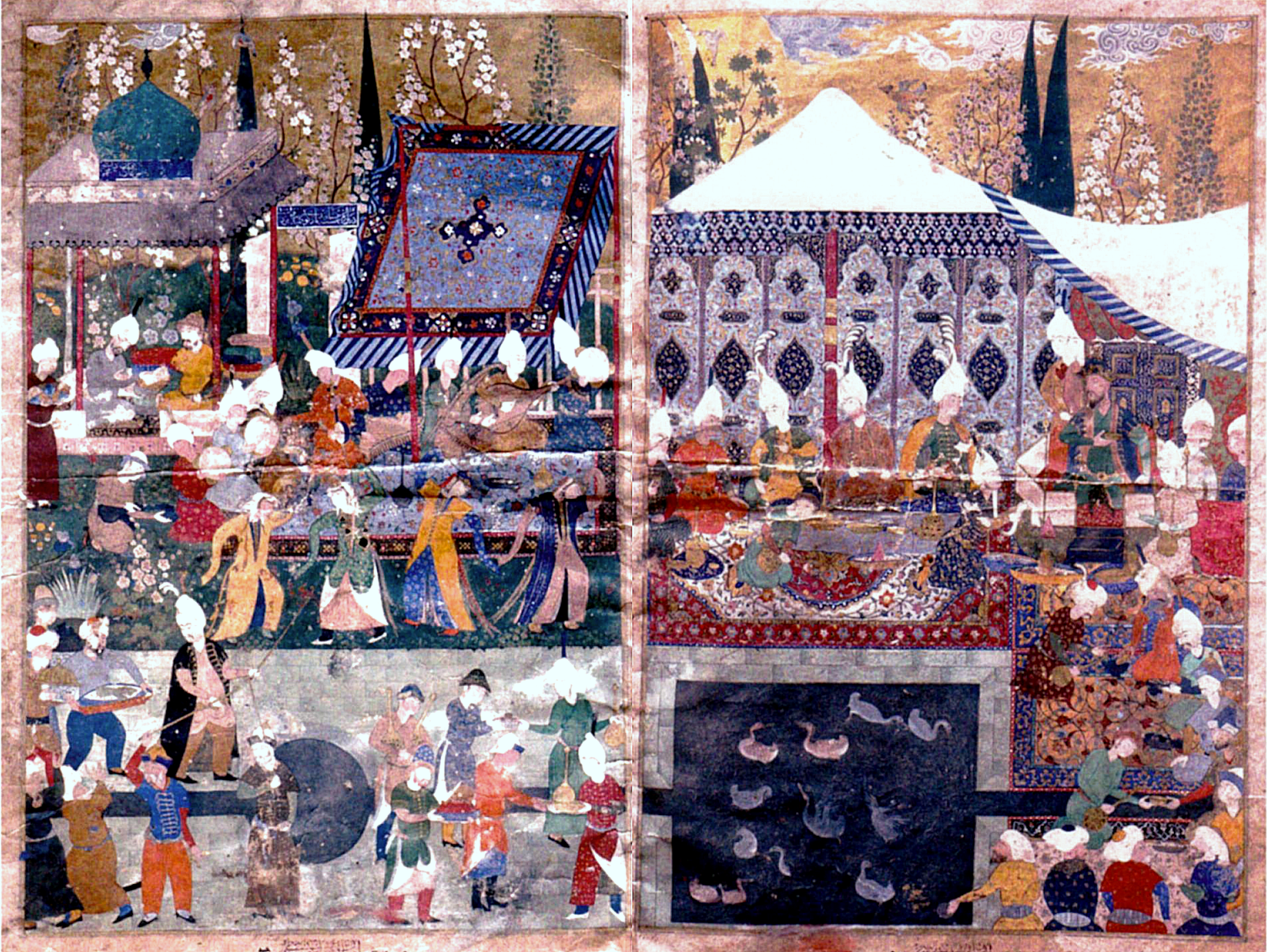
- "The Wedding Celebrations for Muhammad Sultan, Pir Muhammad, and Shah Rukh at the Bagh-i Bihisht, Samarqand", from Sharaf al-Din Ali Yazdi's Zafarnama.
- Born: 1375
- Died: 13 March 1403 (aged 27–28) near Afyonkarahisar (present-day Turkey)
- Burial: Gur-i-Amir, Samarqand (present-day Uzbekistan)
- Issue: See below
Names
- Muhammad Sultan Mirza
- House: House of Timur
- Father: Jahangir Mirza
- Mother: Khanzada Begum
- Religion: Islam

Muhammad Sultan Mirza (1375–1403) was a member of the Timurid dynasty and a grandson of its founder, the Central Asian conqueror Timur. As Timur's favourite grandson, Muhammad Sultan served as one of his principal military commanders, helping lead forces in successful campaigns against the Golden Horde, Persian kingdoms and the Ottoman Empire. Described by the historian Arabshah as "a manifest prodigy in his noble nature and vigour", Muhammad Sultan was eventually appointed by Timur as heir-apparent to the empire. His premature death in 1403 greatly affected his grandfather.

== Background ==
Muhammad Sultan was born in 1375, the elder son of Jahangir Mirza and the only one by his wife, the Sufi princess Khanzada Begum. His father, Timur's favourite son and original heir, died within a few months of his birth. His mother, a maternal granddaughter of Jani Beg, Khan of the Golden Horde, was subsequently remarried to Jahangir's younger brother Miran Shah.

== Military career ==
In 1386, Timur captured Tabriz, the capital of the Jalairid Sultanate. Muhammad Sultan, then only ten years old, was appointed governor of the city. Five years later, he accompanied his grandfather in his invasion of the territory of Tokhtamysh, Khan of the Golden Horde. Initially part of the scouting parties which preceded the army, Timur later gave him command of the army centre, a position he held during the ensuing Battle of the Kondurcha River in June 1391.

In 1393, he took part in the campaign against the Muzaffarids of Fars. He, along with his younger half-brother Pir Muhammad, were sent through Kurdistan, capturing various provinces, with orders to later re-join the main army. Timur himself pursued the Muzaffarid king, Shah Mansur. The armies of the two rulers met outside the city of Shiraz; Timur entrusted his left flank to Muhammad Sultan, the right to Pir Muhammad whilst the centre was given to their uncle Shah Rukh. The battle ultimately resulted in a Timurid victory, with Shah Mansur being killed by Timur's soldiers and his lands subsequently being incorporated into the empire.

Muhammad Sultan once more joined Timur in his war against Tokhtamysh in 1395, accompanying the emperor in a second invasion of the Golden Horde. He led the right wing of the army during the Battle of the Terek River and inflicted heavy damage on the Khan's left flank, forcing it into retreat, with Tokhtamysh himself fleeing soon after. The following year, he was dispatched to the kingdom of Hormuz on the Persian Gulf. After capturing various provincial forts, the prince compelled the ruler, Muhammad Shah, to submit.

In 1397, he was named governor of the eastern province of Ferghana. With the idea of an eventual campaign against China in mind, Timur ordered his grandson to consolidate bases in the region, as well as develop soil cultivation along the route. Muhammad Sultan was given an army of forty thousand and had a fort built in the region of Ashapara, followed by another further east by the Issyk-Kul. The prince intended to use these as a frontier line for operations against the neighbouring kingdom of Moghulistan in 1399. However, this plan was forestalled when his cousin, Iskandar Mirza, drew on Muhammad Sultan's detachments at Ashpara to launch a raid into Chinese Turkestan. This arbitrary action resulted in a grudge between the two princes. Less than a year later, after Iskandar had been transferred to Ferghana while Muhammad Sultan himself was named custodian of Samarqand, the latter had his cousin captured and detained within the city. Iskandar's atabeg and twenty-six of his nobles were executed. Reports of Timur's reaction to the feud are contradictory; one account states that Timur blamed Muhammad Sultan for the dispute and upheld Iskandar, ordering restitution for his nobles. Another says that Timur sided with the former and had Iskandar's feet whipped as punishment.

The prince supposedly pushed Timur to pursue his campaign against the Delhi Sultanate in 1398. The Malfuzat-i Timuri, an alleged autobiography of the emperor, ascribes the following speech to Muhammad Sultan:

"The whole country of India is full of gold and jewels, and in it there are seventeen mines of gold and silver, diamond and ruby and emerald and tin and steel and copper and quicksilver, etc., and of the plants which grow there are those fit for making wearing apparel, and aromatic plants, and the sugar-cane, and it is a country which is always green and verdant, and the whole aspect of the country is pleasant and delightful. Now, since the inhabitants are chiefly polytheists and infidels and idolators and worshippers of the sun, by the order of Allah and his prophet, it is right for us to conquer them."

== As Timur's heir ==
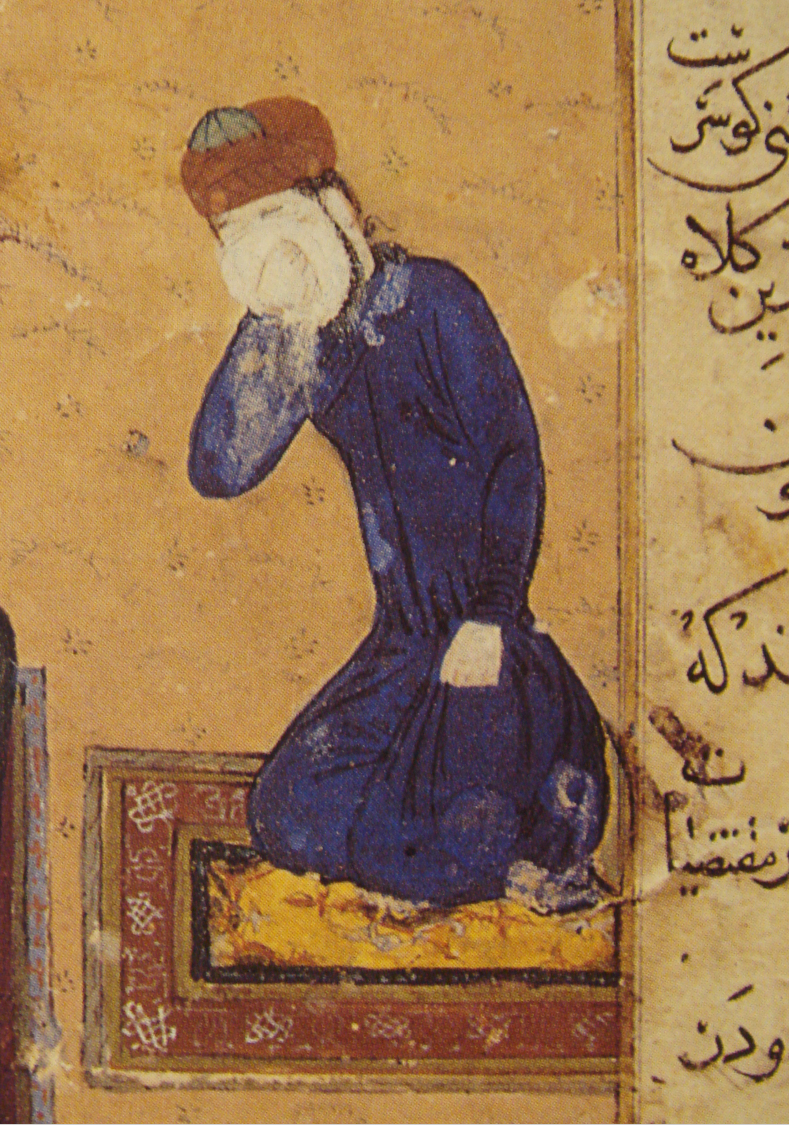
Timur at the funerals of his grandson Muhammad Sultan Mirza ibn Jahangir in 1403. Zafarnama (1436)

Sometime prior to his Indian invasion, Timur had Muhammad Sultan appointed as his heir apparent. When Delhi was conquered in December 1398, Timur had the khutba read there, with the prince's name being said alongside his own. Coins were also struck with Muhammad Sultan's name and title "Vali al-lakhd" (throne-heir) following that of Timur and the puppet-Chagatai Khan. The emperor's choice in successor was mainly based on birth, rather than position or accomplishment; in addition to the prince's own exalted maternal lineage, his father Jahangir, alone of Timur's four sons, was born of a free-wife as opposed to a concubine.

In 1399, he was named governor of Turan. This was followed two years later by an appointment over the lands of the former Mongol Ilkhanate, which Timur termed "the throne of Hulagu." These lands had previously been governed by Muhammad Sultan's disgraced uncle/stepfather Miran Shah.

In 1402, Timur began military engagements in anticipation for his campaign against the Ottoman Sultan, Bayezid I. This was initiated by Muhammad Sultan, recently summoned from Samarqand, besieging and storming the fortress at Kamakh. This was a direct challenge and provocation to Bayezid, who had only recently captured the stronghold from Timur's ally, Taharten. The war culminated on 20 July 1402 with the Battle of Ankara, during which Muhammad Sultan led the main body of the army. The Ottoman forces were decisively defeated, with Bayezid himself being taken captive soon after. Immediately following the battle, the prince was dispatched to the Ottoman capital of Bursa to seize Bayezid's treasury. However, he was narrowly beaten there by the Ottoman prince Süleyman Çelebi, who removed many of the city's greatest treasures. What remained was plundered by the Timurid army, including the gold and enamel inlaid bronze gates, which were later presented to Timur's empress, Saray Mulk Khanum. After the pillaging concluded, Muhammad Sultan had the city torched.

== Death and burial ==
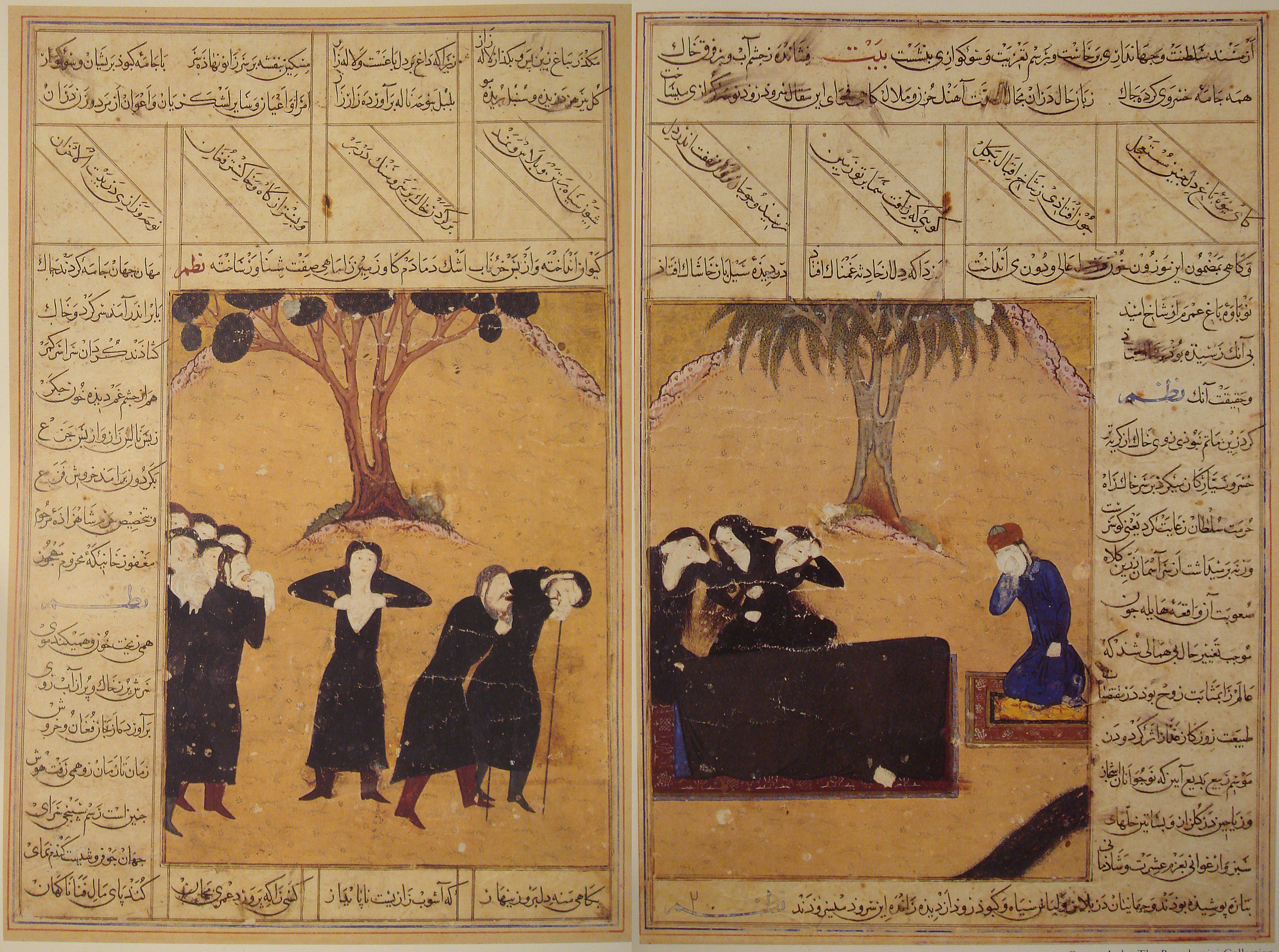
The funerals of Muhammad Sultan Mirza ibn Jahangir in late Spring 1403, an illustration from Yazdi's Zafarnama (1436)

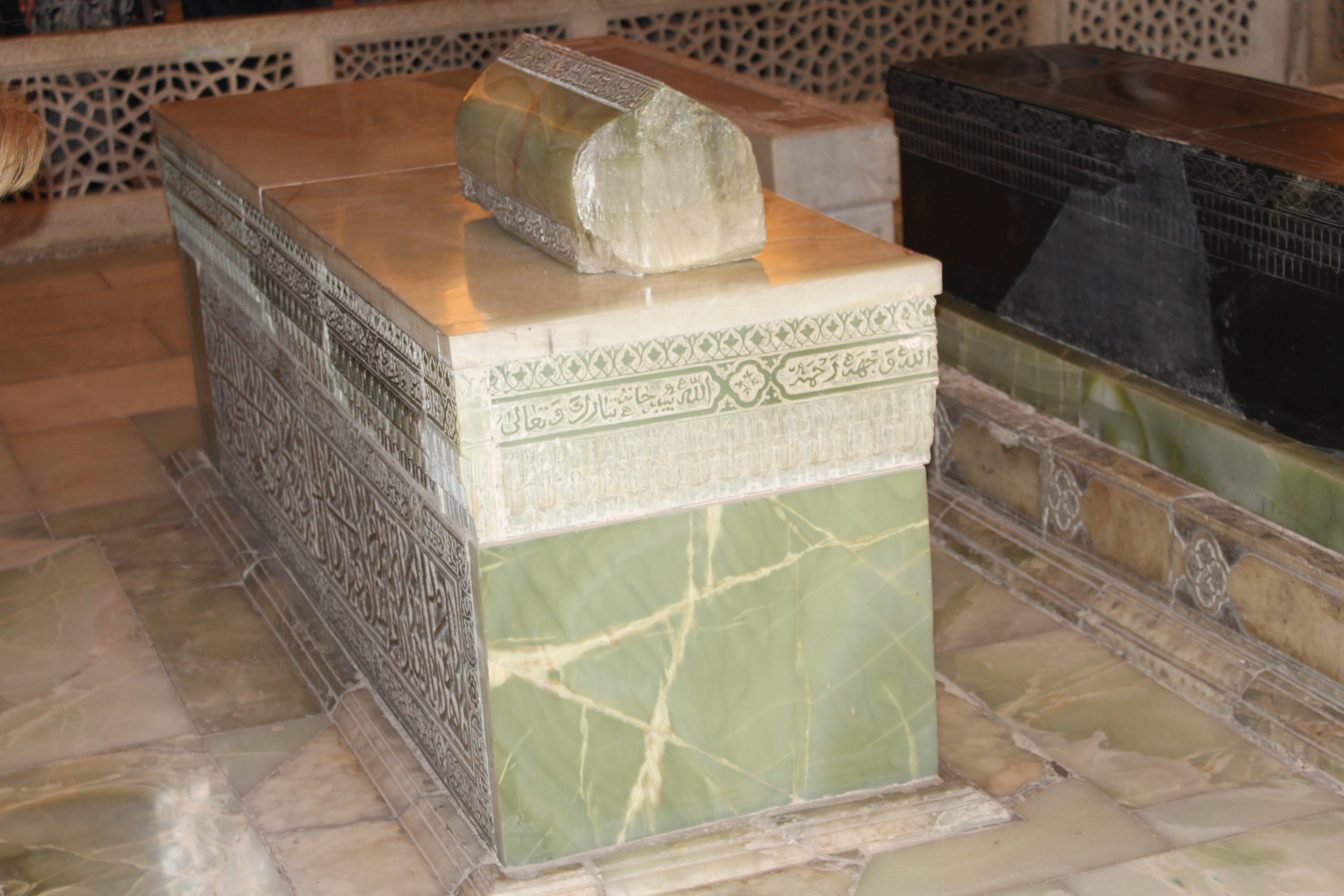
Muhammad Sultan Mirza's headstone beside Timur's in the Gur-i-Amir

Muhammad Sultan was ordered to march back through Ankara to re-join the main army at Kayseri. However, during this journey the prince, already suffering from injuries sustained during the recent battle, fell seriously ill. He died on 12 March 1403, near the city of Afyonkarahisar. Timur bitterly grieved his grandson's passing and ordered the entire army wear dark clothing in mourning. A two hundred horse procession accompanied Muhammad Sultan's body to the fortress of Avnik. From there, he was taken to be temporarily buried in the mazar of Qedar, near the city of Soltaniyeh.

On the anniversary of his death the following year, Muhammad Sultan's remains, accompanied by his mother, were taken for reburial in Samarqand. He was interred in a vault that bore his name, the Khangah-i Muhammad Sultan, part of an existing complex of religious buildings previously erected by the prince. Upon his own death in 1405, Timur was buried there alongside his grandson. Finally, both bodies were moved once more to their present resting-place in the Gur-i-Amir, likely around 1409 by Timur's successor Shah Rukh. The tomb, originally intended for Muhammad Sultan alone, became the Timurid dynastic mausoleum.

== Family ==
=== Wives and concubines ===
- Khan Sultan Khanika: daughter of Muhammad Ughlan Chagatai, and granddaughter of Bayan Quli Khan (Note: Subsequently married Sultan Husayn Tayichiud, and possibly later still Muhammad Sultan's brother Pir Muhammad.)
- Tatali Bi: daughter of Musake Nukuz
- Khand Sultan: daughter of Ali Beg Jauni Qurban Oirot
- Mihr Agha Hazare
- Daulat Sultan
- Janibeg
- La'l Chicak

=== Issue ===
By Khanika

- Yahya (b. c.1400): married Payanda Sultan Agha, daughter of Shah Rukh
- Aka Biki (d. 1419): married Ulugh Beg
  - Habiba Sultan, Khanzada Begum (b. 1412)

By Tatali Bi

- Sa'd-i Waqqas (c.1399 – 1417/18): married Rajab Sultan, daughter of Miran Shah
  - Isiye Biki

By Khand Sultan

- Nuh

By Mihr Agha Hazare

- Muhammad Jahangir (c.1396 – 1433): briefly made a puppet-Chagatai Khan by Khalil Sultan, married Maryam Sultan Agha, daughter of Shah Rukh
  - Muhammad Sultan II (1416 – 1438)
  - Muhammad Khalil
- Aziz Sultan
- A'isha Biki: married first Yusuf Dughlat, married second Sayyidi Ahmad, son of Miran Shah. Had one child by her second marriage
  - Sultan Ahmad

By Daulat Sultan

- Shad Malik
- Fatima Sultan

By Janibeg

- Sivindik Sultan

By La'l Chicak

- Isma'il

== Bibliography ==
- ibn Arabshah, Ahmad (1936), Tamerlane or Timur: The Great Amir, translated by J.H. Sanders, London: Luzac & Co.
- Barthold, Vasilii Vladimirovitch (1963), Four Studies on the History of Central Asia, vol. 2, Leiden: E.J. Brill
- Barthold, Vasilii Vladimirovitch (1974), "V. V. Bartol'd's Article O Pogrebenii Timura ("The Burial of Tīmūr")", Iran, Iran: Journal of the British Institute of Persian Studies, 12, translated by J. M. Rogers, British Institute of Persian Studies: 65–87, doi:10.2307/4300504, JSTOR 4300504
- Bernus-Taylor, Marthe (2003), Tombs of Paradise: The Shah-e Zende in Samarkand and Architectural Ceramics of Central Asia, Monelle Hayot, ISBN 978-2-903824-43-3
- Binbas, İlker Evrim (2014), "Timurid Experimentation with Eschatological Absolutism: Mīrzā Iskandar, Shāh Niʻmatullāh Walī, and Sayyid Sharīf Jurjānī in 815/1412", in Orkhan Mir-Kasimov (ed.), Unity in Diversity: Mysticism, Messianism and the Construction of Religious Authority in Islam, London, Boston: Brill, ISBN 978-90-04-26280-5
- Elliot, Henry Miers; Dowson, John (1871), The History of India, as Told by Its Own Historians: The Muhammadan Period, vol. III, London: Trübner and Company
- Habib, Mohammad; Nizami, Khaliq Ahmad (1970), A Comprehensive History of India: The Delhi Sultanat: (A.D. 1206-1526), vol. V The Delhi Sultanat: (A.D. 1206-1526, People's Publishing House
- Imber, Colin (1990), The Ottoman empire: 1300-1481, The Isis Press, ISBN 978-975-428-015-9
- Jackson, Peter; Lockhart, Lawrence (1986), The Cambridge History of Iran, vol. VI, Cambridge: Cambridge University Press, ISBN 978-0-521-20094-3
- Jackson, Peter (2023). From Genghis Khan to Tamerlane: The Reawakening of Mongol Asia. Yale University Press. ISBN 978-0-300-27504-9.
- Jamaluddin, Syed (1995), The state under Timur: a study in empire building, New Delhi: Har-Anand Publications, ISBN 978-81-241-0258-9
- Karomatov, Ḣamidulla (2001), Amir Temur in world history, Shaq
- Lamb, Harold (1953), The Earth Shakers, Garden City: Doubleday & Company, Inc.
- Manz, Beatrice Forbes (2007), Power, Politics and Religion in Timurid Iran, Cambridge: Cambridge University Press, ISBN 978-1-139-46284-6
- Marefat, Roya (1991), Beyond the Architecture of Death: Shrine of the Shah-i Zinda in Samarqand, Harvard University
- Marozzi, Justin (2012), Tamerlane: Sword of Islam, Conqueror of the World, HarperCollins Publishers, ISBN 978-0-00-736973-7
- Masson, M. E.; Pugachenkova, G. A. (1980), "Shakhri Syabz pri Timure i Ulug Beke ("Shahr-i Sabz from Tmur to Ulugh Beg")", Iran, Iran: Journal of the British Institute of Persian Studies, 18, translated by J. M. Rogers, Iran: Journal of the British Institute of Persian Studies: 121–143, doi:10.2307/4299695, JSTOR 4299695
- O'Kane, Bernard (2009), "Reconciliation Or Estrangement? Colophon And Paintings in the Tιem Ẓafarnāma And Some Other Controversial Manuscripts", Muqarnas, 26, Cambridge, Massachusetts: E.J. Brill, JSTOR 27811141
- Pfeiffer, Judith (2013), Politics, Patronage and the Transmission of Knowledge in 13th – 15th Century Tabriz, Leiden, Boston: BRILL, ISBN 978-90-04-26257-7
- Qazvini, Ḥamd Allah Mustawfi (1913), Tarikh-i-guzida, E.J.W. Gibb Memorial Series, vol. 14, translated by Edward Granville Browne
- Roberts, Andrew (2008), The Art of War: Great Commanders of the Ancient and Medieval Worlds 1600 BC – AD 1600, London: Quercus, ISBN 978-1-84724-259-4
- Roy, Kaushik (2015), Warfare in Pre-British India – 1500BCE to 1740CE, Abingdon, New York: Taylor & Francis, ISBN 978-1-317-58691-3
- Woods, John E. (1991), The Timurid dynasty, Indiana University, Research Institute for Inner Asian Studies
- Woods, John E. (1990), "Timur's Genealogy", in Martin Bernard Dickson; Michel M. Mazzaoui; Vera Basch Moreen (eds.), Intellectual Studies on Islam: Essays Written in Honor of Martin B. Dickson, Salt Lake City: University of Utah Press, ISBN 978-0-87480-342-6
- Yazdi, Sharaf al-Dīn ʻAlī (2008), Amir Timur Beg (1336-1396): English rendering of Molana Sharf-ud-din Ali Yezdi's Persian Zafarnamah, vol. 1, translated by K̲h̲ān Muḥammad ʻĀt̤if, Lucknow: New Royal Book Company, ISBN 978-81-89267-61-2
