= Khalil Sultan =

Amir of the Timurid Empire from 1405 to 1409

- Sultan
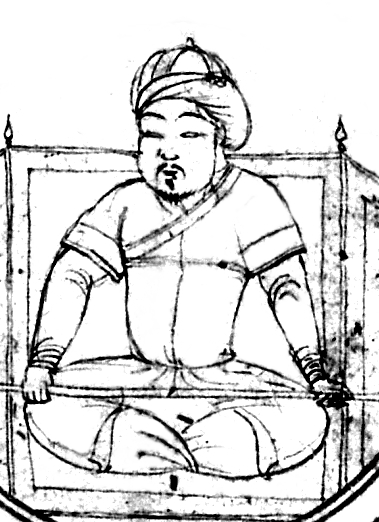
- Contemporary portrait of Khalil Sultan enthroned, from the Timurid genealogy compiled during his reign, 1405–1409 (Topkapi Sarayi Müzesi, H. 2152, fol. 32a)

Amir of the Timurid Empire
- Reign: 18 February 1405 – 1409
- Predecessor: Timur
- Successor: Shah Rukh
- Born: 13 August 1384; Herat
- Died: 3 November 1411 (aged 27); Ray, Timurid Empire
- Burial: Ray (Note: According to the Nusakh-i jahan-ara, Khalil Sultan's remains were first taken to the shrine of Imam Riza at Mashhad and subsequently reinterred at Samarkand; Ibn Arabshah states that he was buried at Ray.)
- Spouse: Jahan Sultan Biki Arlat; Shad Malik Agha
- Issue: Burgul; Muhammad Bahadur; Kichik Agha; Muhammad Baqir; Sultan Badi al-Mulk; Saray Malik Agha; Ali
Names
- Nasir al-Din Khalil Sultan (Note: Woods gives his laqab as Nasir al-Din. Thackston instead gives it as Burhan al-Din.)
- Dynasty: Timurid
- Father: Miran Shah
- Mother: Sevin Beg Khanzada
- Religion: Islam

Khalil Sultan (Persian: خلیل سلطان; 13 August 1384 – 3 November 1411) was the Timurid ruler of Transoxiana from 18 February 1405 to 1409. He was a son of Miran Shah and a grandson of Timur. On Timur's death he took control of Samarkand and held it for four years, until he was displaced by his half-uncle Shah Rukh, who installed his own son Ulugh Beg in the city. Khalil Sultan was afterwards sent to Ray in central Iran, where he died.

== Biography ==
=== Background ===
Khalil Sultan was born at Herat on 24 Jumada II 786 AH (13 August 1384), the son of Miran Shah by Sevin Beg, called Khanzada, a daughter of Aq Husayn Sufi of the Qongirat and of Shakar Beg, a Jochid princess. His foster mother was Timur's senior wife Saray Mulk Khanum, and his atabak was Yahyaka, also called Yahya.

Sevin Beg had first been married to Timur's eldest son Jahangir; after Jahangir's death in 1376 Timur gave her in levirate marriage to Miran Shah, the earliest such union recorded within the Timurid family. Khalil Sultan was therefore a uterine half-brother of Muhammad Sultan, Timur's first designated heir, and of Yadgar Sultan. His full siblings were Muhammad Qasim, who died at the age of one; Biki Sultan, who married in turn Iskandar and Bayqara, both sons of Umar Shaikh; and Fatima Sultan, who died in infancy. Woods notes that although Khalil Sultan is presented in the genealogy compiled during his reign as a descendant of both Genghis Khan and Timur, his mother was not legally a Chinggisid, and he did not bear the title Kuragan that his father and grandfather held.

=== Reign ===
During Timur's lifetime, Khalil Sultan gained Timur's particular favor. He distinguished himself during the campaign in India and in 1402 was given rule of the Ferghana Valley. Upon Timur's death in 1405, Khalil viewed himself as his successor. Pir Muhammad, whom Timur is said to have designated as his heir, was quickly cast aside, and Khalil gained control of Samarkand. (Note: The sources disagree over whether such a designation was in fact made. Ibn Arabshah mentions it only in passing, while Hafiz-i Abru casts Pir Muhammad's claim in different terms again; Woods treats the existence of a testament in his favour as an open question.) Khalil gained Timur's treasury and bestowed the puppet title of Khan (which before had always been granted by Timur to a descendant of Genghis Khan to legitimize his rule) to a Timurid prince, the nine-year-old Muhammad Jahangir. The latter was the son of Timur's first designated heir, the late Muhammad Sultan, with Khalil thus paying nominal respect to Timur's wishes. Muhammad Sultan was also Khalil's own uterine half-brother, and Woods reads Khalil's support for Muhammad Jahangir as a rival "khan" against Pir Muhammad as an alliance with his maternal kin among the descendants of Jahangir. Khalil also gained an ally, Sultan Husayn Tayichiud, who had previously also made claims to the throne as a grandson of Timur.

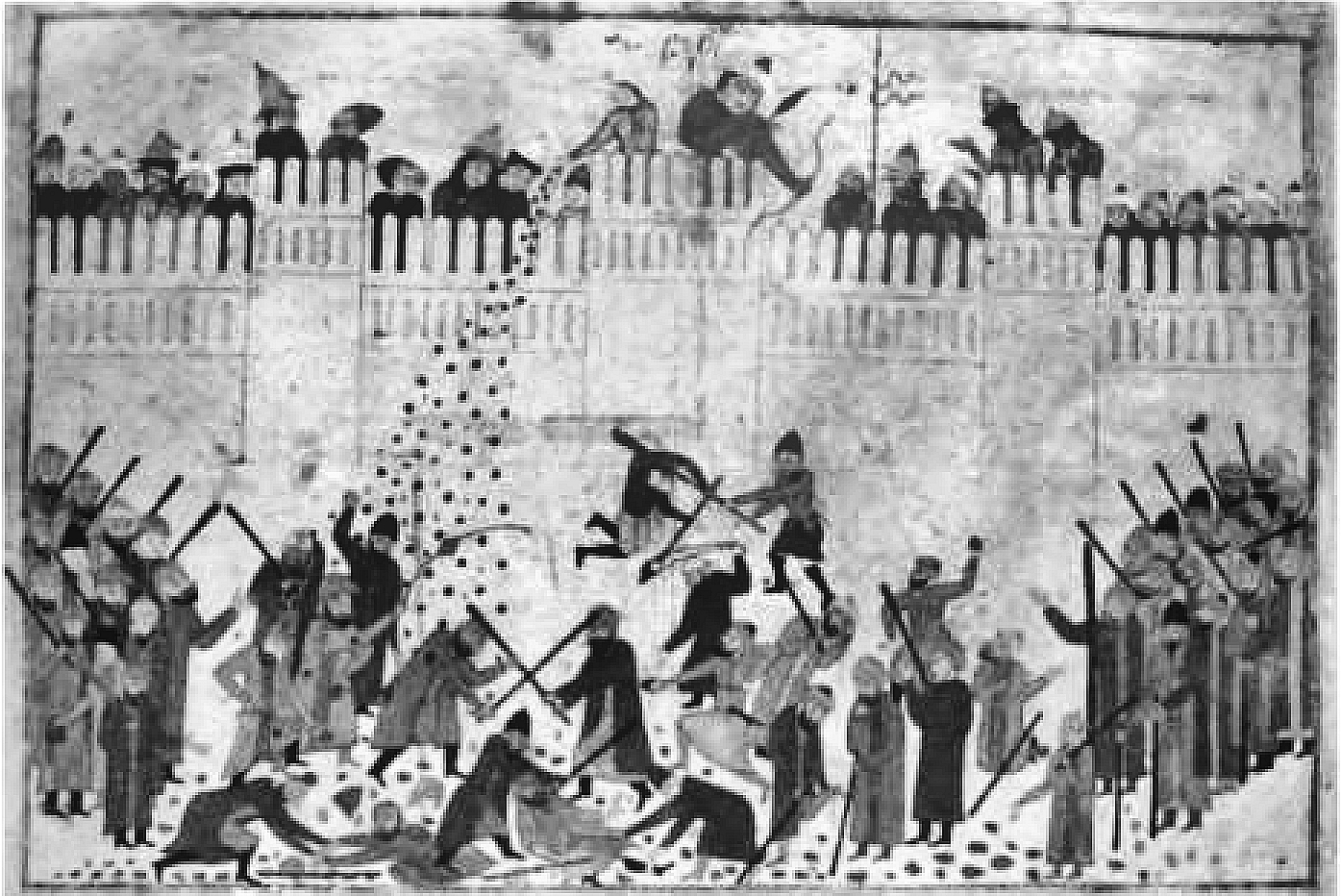
Khalil Sultan at the Wall, fighting rivals; Samarqand (probably), c. 1405–1411 (Topkapi Sarayi Library, H. 2152, fol. 59b)

Khalil Sultan struck coinage in his own name, and the Dastur al-vuzara of Khwandamir lists him first among those after Timur in whose names the khutba and sikka were performed.

=== Loss of Samarkand and death ===
Meanwhile, Shah Rukh, who was ruling in Herat, also decided to press his claims. He advanced to the Oxus River against Khalil but turned back when Khalil's father Miran Shah, as well as his brother Abu Bakr ibn Miran Shah, marched from Azerbaijan in support. Nevertheless, Khalil's position began to weaken. He was unpopular in Samarkand, where the nobility despised his wife Shad Malik Agha. She is said to have had considerable influence over Khalil, convincing him to appoint people of so-called low birth to high positions at the expense of the nobility. A famine caused him to be even more despised. Woods cautions that this picture derives from a hostile narrative tradition: Taj al-Din Salmani laid the blame for Khalil's misjudgements and the loss of Samarkand entirely on Shad Malik's influence, and although Ibn Arabshah echoed that judgement, he did not repeat Salmani's rhetoric attributing her conduct to her servile origins. Khalil decided to return to the Ferghana Valley with his former mentor, Khudaidad Hussain, who went to Moghulistan (the realm of the eastern Chagatai Khans) in an attempt to win their support. However, Persian historian Khwandamir instead claims that Khudaidad Hussain began a civil war against Khalil and took him prisoner, delivering him along with his territory to eastern Chagatai Khan Shams-i-Jahan (r. 1399–1408). Shams-i-Jahan, however, had Khudaidad Hussain executed for his treason to Khalil and returned Khalil his kingdom.

Khalil's rule in Samarkand finally ended when Shah Rukh entered the city unopposed on 13 May 1409. Transoxiana was then given to Shah Rukh's son Ulugh Beg. Khalil decided to surrender to Shah Rukh, who had captured Shad Malik. He received his wife back, and was appointed governor of Ray. He died there on 3 November 1411, aged 27. Hafiz-i Abru and the Nusakh-i jahan-ara report that he died of an illness, and Woods lists his death as due to natural causes, though Ibn Arabshah claimed that he had been poisoned by Shah Rukh; Woods considers Shah Rukh apparently not to have been complicit in his death. According to Ibn Arabshah, Shad Malik took her own life after the alleged murder of her husband and was buried beside him at Ray.

== Family ==
Woods records two legal wives, one concubine and seven children for Khalil Sultan.

=== Consorts ===
- Jahan Sultan Biki Arlat, daughter of Amir Ali Arlat and granddaughter of Timur's sister Shirin Beg Agha, married in 800 AH (1397–1398)
- Shad Malik Agha, daughter of Fulad and previously a concubine (quma) of Haji Sayf al-Din Nukuz, married in 807 AH (1404) and died in 814 AH (1411)
- an unnamed woman of the Tuqmaq, recorded as a concubine (dukhtar-khana)

Woods treats the second of these as a notable instance of a concubine being raised to the status of legal wife outside her master's family. Khalil Sultan became infatuated with Shad Malik, removed her from Haji Sayf al-Din's household and married her without Timur's knowledge. Jahan Sultan Biki complained to Timur, her great-uncle, who ordered Shad Malik's arrest and execution; Saray Mulk Khanum interceded on the grounds that Shad Malik was pregnant, and Timur died before the sentence could be carried out. Ibn Arabshah later accused Shad Malik of poisoning Saray Mulk Khanum.

=== Children ===
Seven children are recorded, four sons and three daughters; three of them are marked in Woods's tables as having died in infancy or childhood.

By Jahan Sultan Biki Arlat:

- Burgul, born 802 AH (1399–1400). He was named by Timur himself, after Timur's own paternal grandfather, as part of a wider revival of names drawn from the family's Mongol and Barlas ancestry.
- Muhammad Bahadur
- Kichik Agha, also called Shirin Beg Agha, who apparently died in infancy. She was fostered by Saray Mulk Khanum.

By Shad Malik Agha:

- Muhammad Baqir, born 5 Ramadan 813 AH (1 January 1411), died 838 AH (1434–1435) at the age of 23
- Sultan Badi al-Mulk, also called Sultanum, who married Ulugh Beg and was subsequently divorced by him. (Note: The divorce is recorded in the Paris manuscript of the Muizz al-ansab, but the Aligarh and London manuscripts instead describe her as Ulugh Beg's honoured wife at the time of writing.) She bore him three sons: Abd al-Aziz, who was killed shortly before his father in 1449; Abd al-Jabbar, born 27 Shawwal 836 AH (16 June 1433); and Abd al-Samad, who died in infancy.
- Saray Malik Agha, who apparently died in infancy. She was fostered by Shah Rukh.

By the unnamed Tuqmaq concubine:

- Ali, who apparently died in infancy

== Ancestry ==
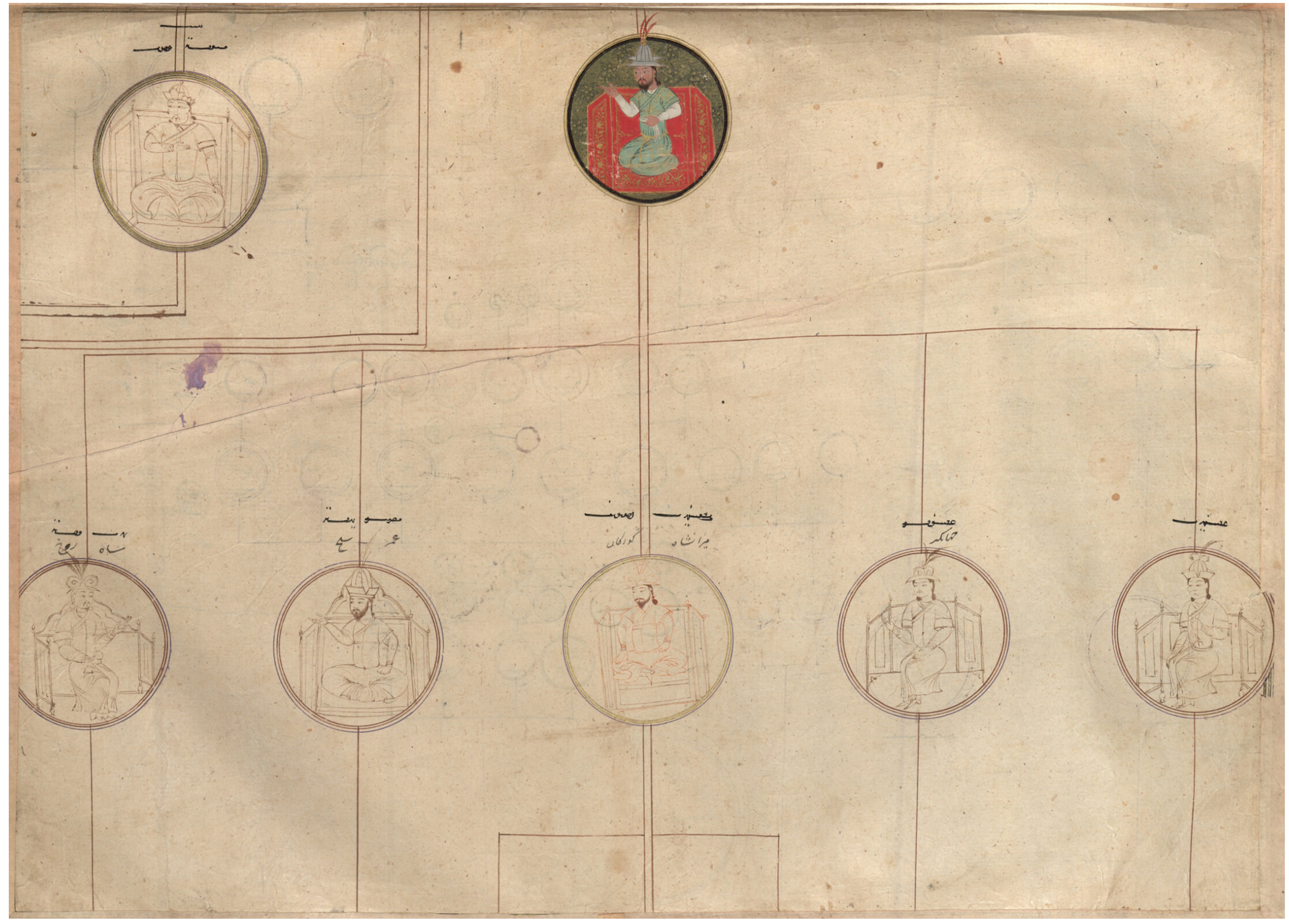
Khalil Sultan created an extensive Turko-Mongol genealogy in 1405–1409, which presented him as a descendant of both Genghis Khan, through his mother, and Timur, through his father (Topkapi Sarayi Müzesi, H2152, detail).

Ancestors of Khalil Sultan

8. Amir Muhammad Taraghai
4. Timur, Timurid Emperor
9. Tekina Khatun
2. Jalal ud-din Miran Shah
10. Hayut Jauni Qurbani
5. Minglijik Beg Agha
1. Khalil Sultan
12. Amir Naghday Qongirat
6. Aq Husayn Sufi Qongirat
3. Khanzada Begum
14. Jani Beg, Khan of the Golden Horde (Note: The sources disagree over the parentage of Shakar Beg. The genealogy compiled for Khalil Sultan makes her a daughter of Jani Beg, while the Muizz al-ansab, Hafiz-i Abru and Yazdi call her a daughter of Özbeg Khan.)
7. Shakar Beg

== Sources ==
- Roemer, H. R. "The Successors of Timur" The Cambridge History of Iran Volume 6: The Timurid and Safavid Periods. Edited by Peter Jackson. New York: Cambridge University Press, 1986. ISBN 0-521-20094-6
- Woods, John E. (2026). Woods, John E.; Binbaş, İlker Evrim (eds.). The Timurid Dynasty: A Handbook, Volume I: Timur and His Family. Handbook of Oriental Studies, Section 8: Uralic & Central Asian Studies. Vol. 34. Leiden and Boston: Brill. doi:10.1163/9789004743984. ISBN 978-90-04-74398-4.

Khalil Sultan Timurid dynasty Born: 1384 1411
| Preceded by Timur | Amir of the Timurid Empire; 1405–1409 | Succeeded by Shah Rukh |
