= Brummett =

Brummett is a surname. Notable people with the surname include:

- Austin Brummett (born 2004), American soccer player
- Greg Brummett (born 1967), American baseball pitcher
- Lyle Brummett (born 1956), American serial killer
- Palmira Brummett (born 1950), American historian
- Tim Brummett (born 1952), American singer-songwriter
- Tyson Brummett (1984–2020), American baseball pitcher

== See also ==
- Brummet
