= Siege of Urgench =

1379 siege

- Part of the Timurid conquests and invasions
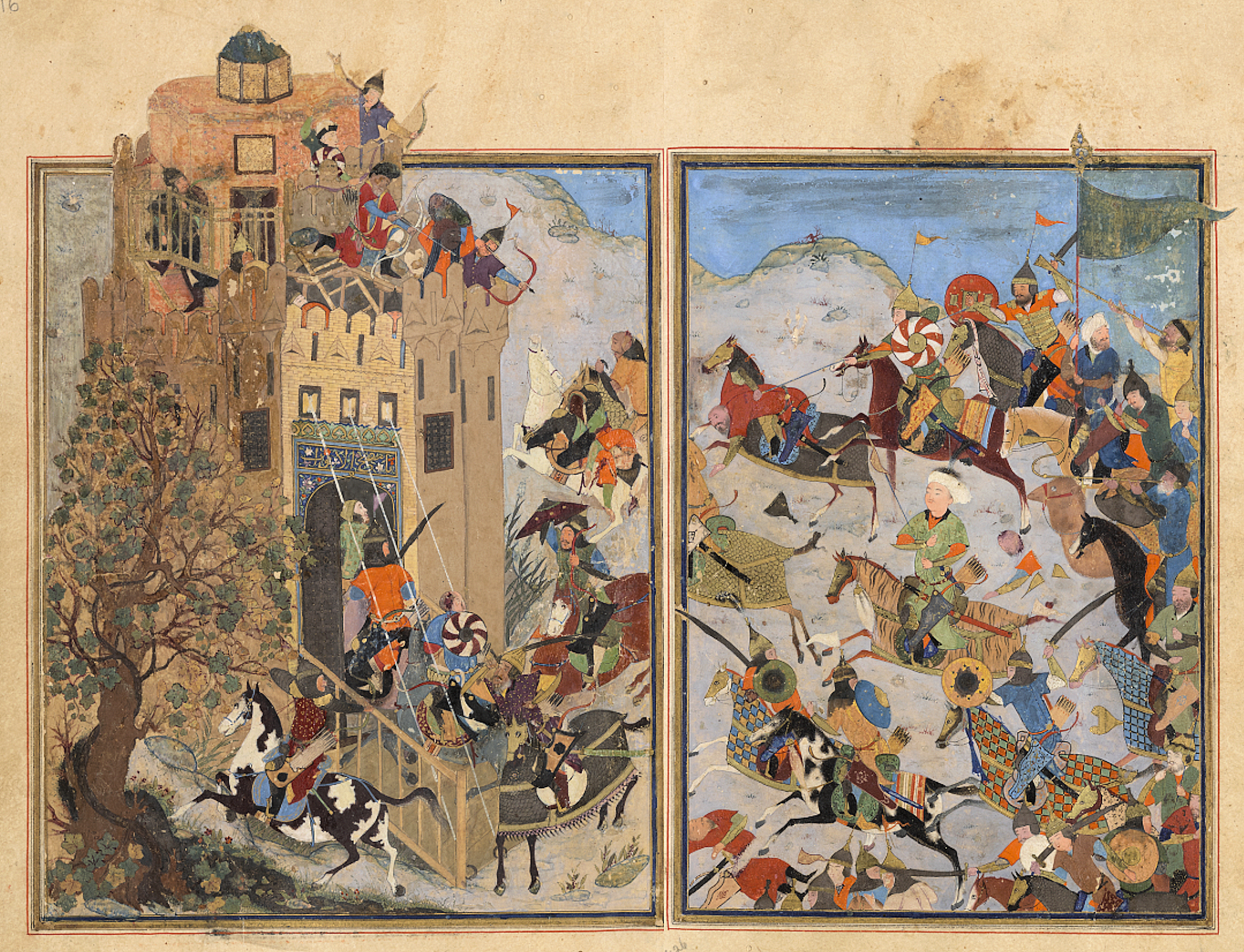
- An action of Timur's army, here led by his son Umar Shaykh, at the siege of Urgench in 1379. Garrett Zafarnama (1480).
Date	1379
Location	Konye-Urgench, Khwarezm 42.32565°N 59.152018°E
Result	Timurid victory

Belligerents
Timurid Empire	Sufi dynasty

Commanders and leaders
Timur; Umar Shaykh	Yusef Sufi
- Location within West and Central Asia Siege of Urgench (Turkmenistan)

The Siege of Urgench (1379) was led against the ancient city of Konye-Urgench by Timur's army, in which also participated his son Umar Shaykh.

Since the 1360s, the Turco-Mongol Sufi dynasty ruler Husain Sufi had been expanding his territories in Central Asia, establishing a new Khwarizmian kingdom over the territories of Urgench, including the Transoxonian territories of Khiva and Kath. When Timur became ruler of Transoxonia in 1371, he led claim to the territories of Khiva and Kath.

In 1373, Timur attacked Khwarezm, and its ruler Yusef Sufi of the Sufi dynasty surrendered to Timur, recognizing Timur suzerainty over the Kath-Khiva region. Relations seemed to warm up as the beautiful Khanzade, daughter of Yusuf, was married to Timur's son Jahangir.

Still, Yusuf Sufi's continuing incursions into Timur's territory prompted another invasion by Timur in 1379. In 1379, Yusef Sufi openly rebelled against Timur. This time Urgench was besieged; Yusuf Sufi died in the middle of the siege and Timur demanded the city's surrender. The city refused; as a result when Timur's army finally did capture it by force, after a siege of three months, a general massacre followed and the city was burned down.

Timur was then able to annex the whole of Khwarazm.

== Sources ==
- Bosworth, Clifford Edmund (1978). "Khwarazm". The Encyclopedia of Islam. Vol. IV. Leiden: E. J. Brill. ISBN 90-04-05745-5.
- Grousset, René (1970). The Empire of the Steppes: A History of Central Asia. Rutgers University Press. pp. 420–421. ISBN 978-0-8135-1304-1.
- Hildinger, Erik (1997). Warriors of the Steppe: A Military History of Central Asia, 500 B.C. to 1700 A.D. Da Capo.
