= Sevin Beg Khanzada =

Princess of Khwarezm (c. 1360 – 1411)

Khanzada
- Princess of Khwarezm
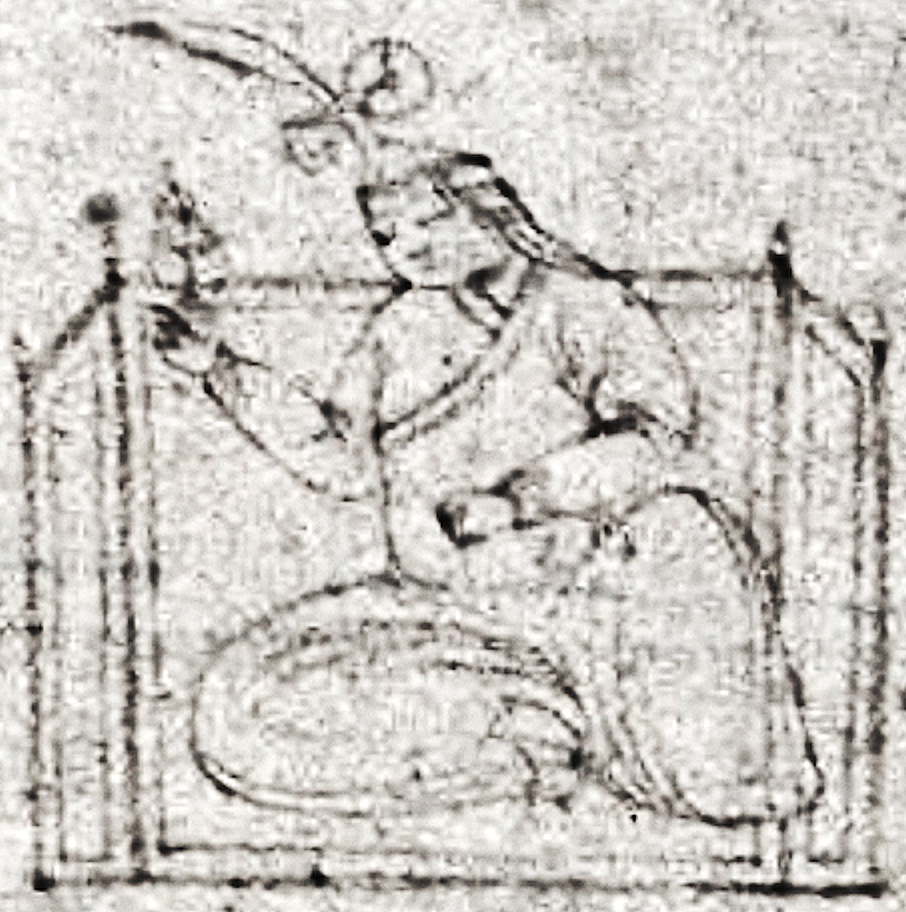
- Contemporary portrait of Khanzade, in Timurid genealogy 1405-1409 (Topkapi Sarayi Müzesi, H2152)
- Born: Sevin Beg c. 1360
- Died: November 1411 (aged 50–51); Mashhad, Timurid Empire (present-day Iran)
- Burial: Imam Reza shrine, Mashhad
- Spouses: Jahangir; Miran Shah
- Issue: Muhammad Sultan Mirza; Yadigar Sultan Begum; Khalil Sultan; Muhammad Qasim
- House: Sufi dynasty (by birth); Timurid dynasty (by marriage)
- Father: Aq Sufi
- Mother: Shakar Beg
- Religion: Islam

Sevin Beg Khanzada (c. 1360 – 1411), also known as Khanzada, was a princess of the Sufi dynasty, the ruling Turco-Mongol dynasty of Khwarezm, and daughter-in-law twice-over to the Central Asian conqueror Timur through her marriages to his sons Jahangir and Miran Shah. Through her maternal grandfather Jani Beg, she was a direct descendant of Genghis Khan.

== Early life ==
Khanzada was a member of the Sufi Dynasty, descended from the Mongol Qongirat tribe. Her parents were the nobleman Aq Sufi and his wife, the Mongol princess Shakar Beg. Though originally named Sevin Beg, Khanzada received her more famous nickname (literally meaning "born of a Khan") in reference to her maternal grandfather, the Khan of the Golden Horde, Jani Beg, a descendant of Genghis Khan.

== Marriage to Jahangir ==
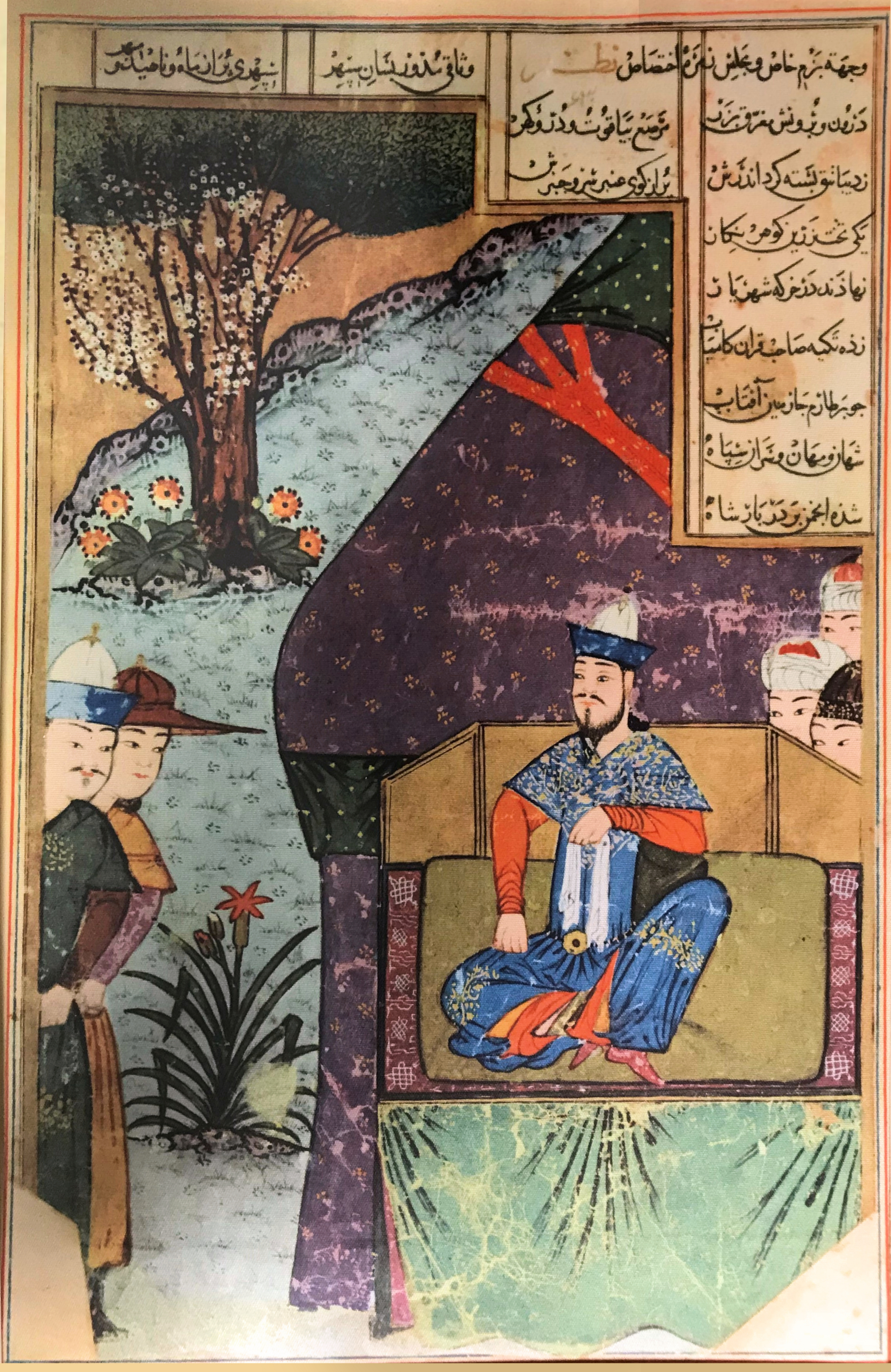
Timur chairing the marriage ceremony of Jahangir with Sevin Beg Khanzada in June 1374. Zafarnama, Folio 139v.

In the 1350s, Khanzada's uncle Husayn Sufi captured the former Chagatai province of Khwarezm, making him the first ruler of the new Sufi dynasty. Timur, who had laid claim to the whole of the Chagatai Khanate, used this seizure as a pretext to demand, and later invade Sufi's domains in 1372. Husayn was forced into retreat by the assault and died a few days later. His brother and successor, Yusuf Sufi, requested a truce with Timur, who agreed on the condition that Khanzada be given in marriage to his son Jahangir. Yusuf agreed, promising to send Khanzada whenever the order would be given, at which point Timur withdrew.

However, a noble named Sultan Mahmud Khattalani, whose father had been executed by Timur, fled to Yusuf Sufi and convinced him to renege on the truce. Sufi launched an attack on Timurid lands by assaulting the city of Kath. Timur, after wintering in his capital, marshalled a large army in response and marched towards Khwarezm. As the army approached, Yusuf, in an attempt to placate Timur, sent the emperor emissaries and gifts. The latter agreed to halt the invasion, but demanded that Khanzada be dispatched for the marriage as soon as possible.

That spring, Khanzada was sent to Timur's capital of Samarqand with a large procession carrying gifts, including gems, precious metals, silks and tapestries. She was escorted by a retinue of handmaidens and mounted soldiers, while she herself rode veiled on a white camel. She was greeted by an entourage sent by the emperor, which included nobles, generals, Qadis, Sayyids and Ulamas. The city had been decorated for the occasion, and after a procession through the streets, she and Jahangir were married at a time which had been deemed auspicious by astrologers.

Khanzada and Jahangir had two children during their brief marriage; Muhammad Sultan Mirza and Yadigar Sultan Begum. However, Jahangir died of illness only two years after their wedding. Subsequently, Timur had Khanzada remarried to Jahangir's younger brother Miran Shah in 1383.

== Marriage to Miran Shah ==
Miran Shah was one of Timur's most powerful governors, having been granted by his father the lands of Azerbaijan and the entirety of northern Persia, including the cities of Baghdad, Tabriz and Soltaniyeh, as a fief. However, following a fall from a horse whilst hunting in 1397, Miran Shah allegedly began suffering from mental instability. The prince's behaviour became increasingly arbitrary and unpredictable and included erratic spending, destruction of historical monuments and a badly mismanaged military campaign against Georgia.

By 1399, Miran Shah's behaviour had finally forced Khanzada to abandon him and flee to Timur's court at Samarqand. She reported to her father-in-law Miran Shah's actions as well as his intention to overthrow him, suggesting that "If the victorious army does not cast its mighty shadow over Azerbaijan, it is quite probable that the prince will rebel." She also revealed to the emperor the mistreatment she herself had suffered at her husband's hands. The biographer Dawlatshah states that Timur was moved to tears when Khanzada presented to him her blood-stained chemise, though this episode is not confirmed in contemporary sources. Official histories only state that Miran Shah had made crude accusations against her that were later disproven. Nevertheless, Miran Shah was taken into imperial custody, and the angry Khanzada never returned to her husband, instead remaining with the emperor in Samarqand.

== Later life ==
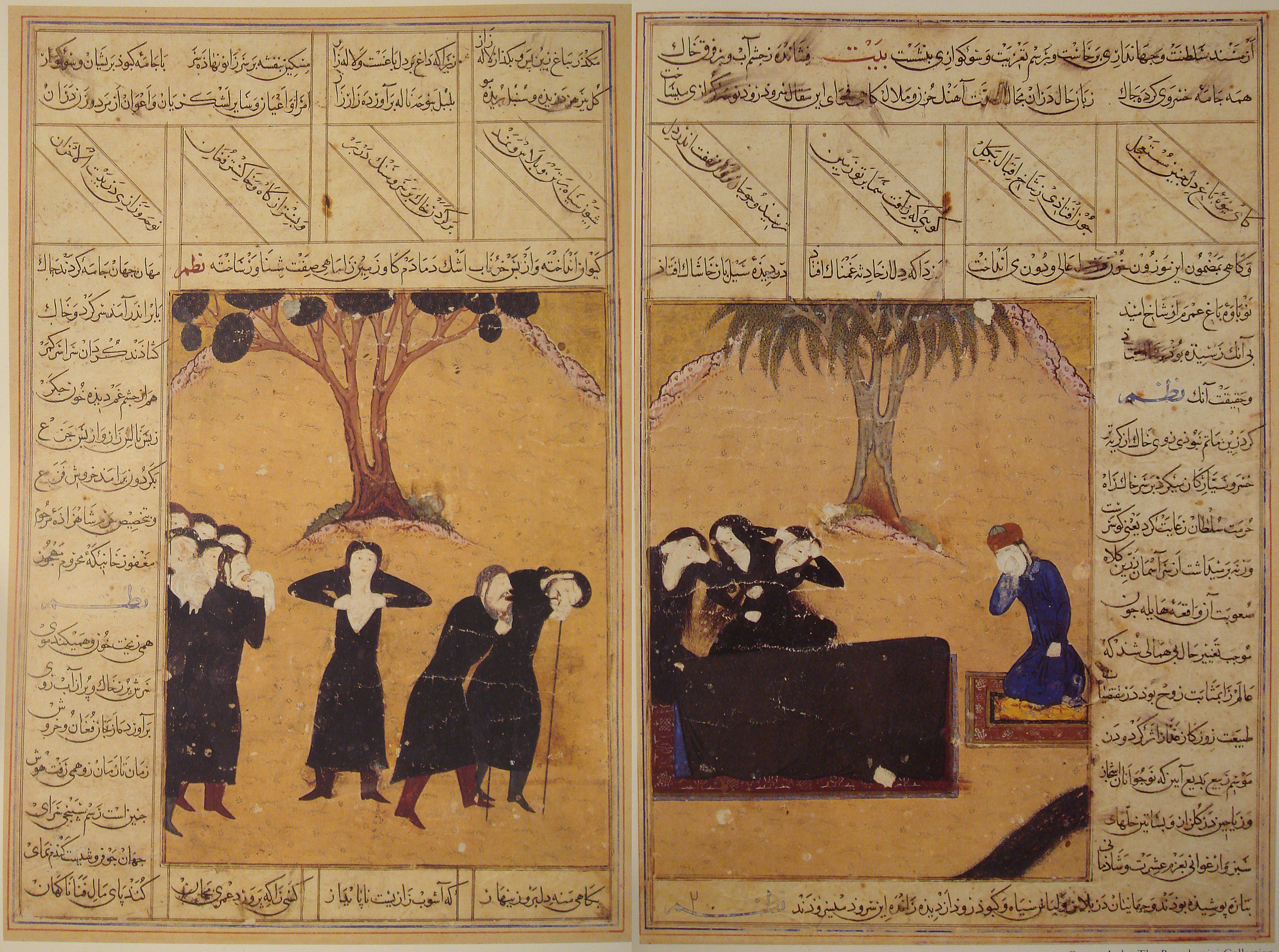
The funerals of Muhammad Sultan Mirza ibn Jahangir in late Spring 1403, an illustration from Yazdi's Zafarnama (1436)

Khanzada appears to have maintained an exalted position at the Timurid court. She is described as being among the women invited to Timur's grand feasts, along with the empress Saray Mulk Khanum. She also hosted her own feasts, including one in honour of the Castilian ambassador Ruy González de Clavijo in 1405. Though de Clavijo dismissively described her at this point as "fair, fat and forty", he noted that servants approached Khanzada with the same series of kneeling movements that Timur himself would be approached with, and that her feast closely resembled those held by the emperor.

In March 1403, Khanzada received word of the death of her eldest son, Muhammad Sultan. The prince had suffered wounds during the Battle of Ankara the previous summer, from which he did not fully recover. Khanzada collapsed upon hearing the news and reportedly pulled out her hair, ripped her clothes and tore at her face. After attending his funeral in Soltaniyeh, she later accompanied her son's body for its reburial in Samarqand.

Khanzada herself died in Mashhad in November 1411, a few days after the death of her second son, Khalil Sultan. She was buried next to the Imam Reza shrine.

== Issue ==
By Jahangir Mirza

- Muhammad Sultan (1375–1403)
  - Yahya (b.c. 1400)
  - Sa'd Waqqas (c. 1399–1417/8)
  - Muhammad Jahangir (1396–1433)
  - Aka Biki (d.1419), married:
    - Ulugh Beg, son of Shah Rukh
  - Aziz Sultan
  - A'isha Biki, married:
    - 1. Yusuf, son of Sulayman Shah Dughlat
    - 2. Sayyidi Ahmad, son of Miran Shah
  - Shad Malik
- Yadigar Sultan Begum

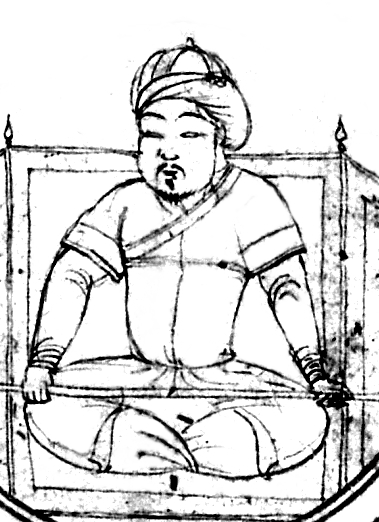
Contemporary portrait of Khalil Sultan, son of Miran Shah with Sevin Beg Khanzada. Timurid genealogy 1405–1409.

By Miran Shah

- Khalil Sultan (1384–1411)
  - Burgul (b.1399)
  - Muhammad Bahadur
  - Muhammad Baqir (1411–1434)
  - Ali
  - Kichik Agha
  - Shirin Beg Agha
  - Sultan Badi'al-Mull, married:
    - Ulugh Beg, son of Shah Rukh
  - Saray Malik Agha
- Muhammad Qasim
- Biki Sultan, married:
  - 1. Iskandar, son of Umar Shaikh I
  - 2. Bayqara I, son of Umar Shaikh I

== Bibliography ==
- Adshead, S.A.M. (2016), Central Asia in World History, Springer, ISBN 978-1-349-22624-5
- Asimov, Muchammed Sajfiddinoviĉ; Dani, Ahmad Hasan; Bosworth, Clifford Edmund (1992), History of Civilizations of Central Asia, vol. IV, Motilal Banarsidass Publ., ISBN 978-81-208-1595-7
- Barthold, Vasilii Vladimirovitch (1963), Four Studies on the History of Central Asia, vol. 2, Brill Archive
- Barthold, Vasilii Vladimirovitch (1974), "V. V. Bartol'd's Article O Pogrebenii Timura ("The Burial of Tīmūr")", Iran, Iran: Journal of the British Institute of Persian Studies, 12, translated by J. M. Rogers, British Institute of Persian Studies: 65–87, doi:10.2307/4300504, JSTOR 4300504
- Binbas, İlker Evrim (2016), Intellectual Networks in Timurid Iran: Sharaf al-Dīn 'Alī Yazdī and the Islamicate Republic of Letters, Cambridge University Press, ISBN 978-1-107-05424-0
- Brummett, Palmira Johnson (2009), The 'book' of Travels: Genre, Ethnology, and Pilgrimage, 1250-1700, BRILL, ISBN 978-90-04-17498-6
- de Clavijo, Ruy González (2004), Embassy to Tamerlane, 1403-1406, translated by Guy Le Strange, Psychology Press, ISBN 978-0-415-34489-0
- Farhat, May (2002), Islamic Piety and Dynastic Legitimacy: The Case of the Shrine of ʻAlī B. Mūsá Al-Riḍā in Mashhad (10th-17th Century), Harvard University
- Gabbay, Alyssa (19 March 2020). Gender and Succession in Medieval and Early Modern Islam: Bilateral Descent and the Legacy of Fatima. Bloomsbury Publishing. ISBN 978-1-83860-234-5.
- Jackson, Peter; Lockhart, Lawrence (1986), The Cambridge History of Iran, vol. VI, Cambridge University Press, ISBN 978-0-521-20094-3
- Jalali, Ghulam Reza (2008), مشاهیر مدفون در حرم رضوی [Dignitaries buried in the Holy Shrine of Imam al-Rida (A.S.)] (in Persian), Mashhad, Iran: Islamic Research Foundation, Astan Quds Razavi, ISBN 9789649712390
- Jamaluddin, Syed (1985), "Status of Women of the Ruling Timurid Family", Proceedings of the Indian History Congress, 45, Indian History Congress
- Karomatov, Ḣamidulla (2001), Amir Temur in world history, Shaq
- Khvand Mir (1994), Habibü's-siyer: Moğol ve Türk hâkimiyeti, translated by Wheeler McIntosh Thackston, Department of Near Eastern Languages and Civilizations, Harvard University
- Kurz, Susanne; Preckel, Claudia; Reichmuth, Stefan (2016), Muslim Bodies, LIT Verlag Münster, ISBN 978-3-643-12810-2
- Marozzi, Justin (2012), Tamerlane: Sword of Islam, Conqueror of the World, HarperCollins Publishers, ISBN 978-0-00-736973-7
- Nashat, Guity; Beck, Lois (2003), Women in Iran from the Rise of Islam to 1800, University of Illinois Press, ISBN 978-0-252-07121-8
- Sims, Eleanor G.; Grube, Ernst J.; Marshak, Boris Ilʹich (2002), Peerless Images: Persian Painting and Its Sources, Yale University Press, ISBN 978-0-300-09038-3
- Soucek, Priscilla (December 15, 1998), "ESKANDAR SOLṬĀN", Encyclopaedia Iranica, Encyclopaedia Iranica Foundation
- Woods, John E. (1990), "Timur's Genealogy", in Martin Bernard Dickson; Michel M. Mazzaoui; Vera Basch Moreen (eds.), Intellectual Studies on Islam: Essays Written in Honor of Martin B. Dickson, University of Utah Press, ISBN 978-0-87480-342-6
- Woods, John E. (1991), The Timurid dynasty, Indiana University, Research Institute for Inner Asian Studies, p. 17
