= Sultan Husayn Tayichiud =

Timurid noble

- Born: 1380
- Died: 1405 (aged 24–25); Herat, Timurid Empire (present-day Afghanistan)
- Spouse: Qutlugh Sultan
- Issue: Firuza Begum
- House: Tayichiud
- Father: Muhammad Beg
- Mother: Aka Biki
- Religion: Islam

Sultan Husayn Tayichiud (1380 – 1405) was a noble of the Timurid Empire and a maternal grandson of its founder, the Central Asian conqueror Timur. Sultan Husayn held prominent positions in the Imperial army and accompanied his grandfather on several of his military campaigns. He was executed by his uncle Shah Rukh during the war of succession following Timur's death.

== Background ==
Sultan Husayn was born in 1380, the son of Muhammad Beg of the Tayichiud tribe and his wife Aka Biki, also known as Taghay Shah (d.1382), a daughter of Timur. His paternal grandfather was Amir Musa, an influential noble and the uncle of Timur's chief consort, Saray Mulk Khanum.

== Military career ==
=== Indian campaign ===
Sultan Husayn was recorded as accompanying Timur to the Indian subcontinent during his war against the Delhi Sultanate in 1398. On 18 December, he led the left flank of the Timurid army in the Second Battle of Delhi against Mahmud Shah Tughlaq. Following a surprise assault against Mahmud Shah's advance guard, Sultan Husayn's cousin Pir Muhammad led a charge against the left wing of the Tughlaq army, whilst Sultan Husayn simultaneously attacked the right, pushing it back against the gates of the city. When an elephant-led charge against the Timurid centre was beaten back by volleys of arrows, the Tughlaq army was forced to retreat back into Delhi. On 20 December, the city surrendered to Timur.

=== Ottoman and Levantine campaigns ===
The following year, Timur declared war on the Mamluks of Egypt and the Ottoman Empire, ruled by An-Nasir Faraj and Bayezid I respectively. When approaching the Mamluk city of Aleppo in October 1400, the emperor defeated the city's defenders during a battle in which Sultan Husayn led the vanguard of the left flank. However, by the time the Timurids moved on to lay siege to Damascus, soldiers in the army had begun to complain of weariness from the long campaign. Many started to desert to the enemy, including Sultan Husayn, who led a small band of followers to defect to the Egyptians on 30 December 1400. He was forced to change out of his Central Asian clothing and his pigtail, a style commonly worn among Timur's warriors, was cut off. He was captured following a sortie against the besiegers and brought before his grandfather, who ordered his feet be whipped as punishment for his betrayal.

The wars culminated in the Battle of Ankara, fought against Bayezid I on 20 July 1402. Sultan Husayn was once more placed at the command of the vanguard of the left flank. Bayezid's Tatar cavalry switched sides to Timur during the battle, whilst Sultan Husayn forced the Ottoman right flank into retreat. These prompted Bayezid's son, Süleyman Çelebi, to flee the battlefield with his soldiers. Following the rout of the Ottoman infantry by the Timurid centre and the defeat of the Janissaries, Bayezid was captured and victory was declared by Timur.

== War of succession and death ==
In the winter of 1404, Timur launched his invasion of Ming China, in what was to become his final campaign. Aware that the marches of Moghulistan, which lay between his empire and China, would need to be subjugated before any attack further east, Timur distributed his 200,000 strong force across the region. Sultan Husayn, commanding the left wing, was dispatched to Yasi while Khalil Sultan, commanding the right, was sent to Tashkent. Both grandsons were ordered to return with their men in the spring, while Timur himself continued on toward Beijing. He died however, on 18 February 1405, prior to ever reaching the Chinese border.

News of the emperor's death quickly reached his family, who began marshalling their forces in preparation for the imminent power struggle. Sultan Husayn, aware that he could not count on the loyalty of all his soldiers, abandoned his army and broke away with a detachment of 1000 troops towards Samarqand. He hoped to take his grandfather's imperial capital by surprise and by capturing it, bolster his claim as Timur's successor.

However, his cousin Khalil Sultan (who had declared himself emperor at Tashkent) reached the city first, claiming it alongside Timur's imperial treasury. Sultan Husayn, knowing that his claims were now hopeless, aligned himself with Khalil Sultan, who dispatched him at the head of a 30,000 strong army against Pir Muhammad, Timur's favoured successor. However, a noble named Pir 'AlI Taz convinced Sultan Husayn to abandon his cousin and reassert his own claim. Heeding this advice, he called an assembly of his nobles and immediately had two of them executed. The remaining number, in fear of their lives, swore their allegiance to Sultan Husayn, who then led his army against Samarqand. Khalil Sultan's troops went out to meet him and on July 1405, defeated Sultan Husayn and pursued him up to the city of Balkh, capturing his belongings and harem.

Sultan Husayn took refuge with Sulayman Shah Dughlat, a nephew of Timur and a regional governor. While Khalil Sultan had no interest in pursuing his cousin further, Pir Muhammad insisted on his extradition. Sulayman Shah refused, and when Pir Muhammad sent an army against him in response, he and Sultan Husayn both fled to Timur's youngest son Shah Rukh, who ruled from Herat. Shah Rukh, deciding that Sulayman Shah should have surrendered the pretender on the first demand, had the latter imprisoned. Sultan Husayn was subsequently executed. The skin of his head, stuffed with grass, was sent to Pir Muhammad, while his body parts were displayed in the bazaars of Herat.

== Family ==
=== Wives ===
- Qutlugh Sultan, a daughter of his uncle Miran Shah
- Khan Sultan Khanika, a granddaughter of Bayan Quli Khan, and widow of Muhammad Sultan Mirza

=== Descendants ===
- Firuza Begum (d.1489) (by Qutlugh Sultan) – married Mansur Mirza, son of Bayqara Mirza I, son of Umar Shaikh Mirza I
    - Bayqara Mirza II (d.1487) – married Sa'adat Sultan, a great-granddaughter of Umar Shaikh Mirza I
    - Aka Biki – married Sultan Ahmad Mirza, a grandson of both Miran Shah and Muhammad Sultan Mirza
    - Badi al-Jamal – married Ahmad Khan, Khan of the Golden Horde
    - Sultan Husayn Bayqara Mirza (1438–1506) – married several women
    - Urun Sultan Khanum
