= Battle of the Kondurcha River =

1391 battle of the Tokhtamysh–Timur war

Coordinates: 53°27′N 50°27′E

- Part of the Tokhtamysh–Timur war
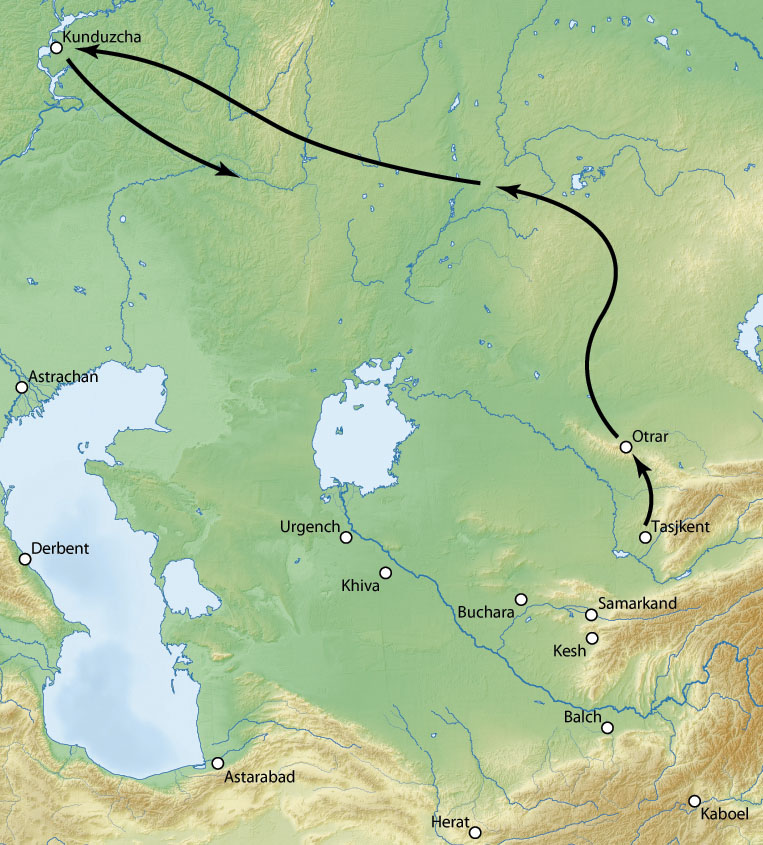
- Timur's First Deshti Kipchak Campaign (1391)
Date	18 June 1391
Location	Volga Bulgaria, Golden Horde
Result	Timurid victory

Belligerents
Timurid Empire	Golden Horde: Alans; Vainakhs; Circassians; Russians

Commanders and leaders
Timur; Muhammad; Umar Shaykh I Miran Shah	Tokhtamysh

Strength
Approximately 100,000	180,000–200,000; 240,000–300,000

Casualties and losses
Unknown	Approximately 100,000

The Battle of the Kondurcha River (18 June 1391) was the first major battle of the Tokhtamysh–Timur war. It took place at the Kondurcha River, in the Bulgar Ulus of the Golden Horde, in present-day Samara Oblast, Russia. Tokhtamysh's cavalry tried to encircle Timur's army from the flanks. However, the Central Asian army withstood the assault, after which its sudden frontal attack put the Horde troops to flight. However, many of the Golden Horde troops escaped to fight again at Terek.

Timur had previously assisted Tokhtamysh in taking the throne of the White Horde in 1378. In the following years both men grew in power, with Tokhtamysh taking full control of the Golden Horde while Timur expanded his power all over the Middle East. However Timur took Azerbaijan, which Tokhtamysh believed was rightfully Golden Horde territory. He invaded Timurid territory, briefly besieging Samarkand before being chased off by Timur. Timur pursued Tokhtamysh until the latter turned to fight him next to the Kondurcha River.

== Sources ==
- "Кондырча буендагы сугыш". Tatar Encyclopaedia (in Tatar). Kazan: The Republic of Tatarstan Academy of Sciences. Institution of the Tatar Encyclopaedia. 2002.
- Marozzi, Justin (2004). Tamerlane Sword of Islam, Conqueror of the World. HarperCollins. ISBN 0-00-711611-X.
- Hookham, Hilda (1962). Tamburlaine the Conqueror. Hodder and Stoughton.
