= You Only Live Twice (Tim Brummett album) =

Studio album by Tim Brummett
- Released: 2005
- Length: 39:20
- Label: Christander Records
- Producer: Joseph W. Brasch

You Only Live Twice is the first studio album by singer-songwriter Tim Brummett, released in 2005 through Christander Records.

== Track listing ==
1. "Only in My Dreams"
2. "Tangerine Trees"
3. "I Do"
4. "Love at First Sight"
5. "Lullabies of the Lost"
6. "God Always Knew"
7. "Share your Load"
8. "The Answer"
9. "Try as I Might"
10. "Twisted Bliss"
