= Brummet =

Brummet is a surname. Notable people with the surname include:

- Anthony Brummet (1931–2024), Canadian educator and politician
- Don E. Brummet (1914–1981), American politician and businessman

== See also ==
- Brummett
