= Tim Brummett =

American singer-songwriter

- Birth name: Timothy Dennis Brummett
- Born: September 1, 1952 (age 72)
- Origin: Spokane, Washington, U.S.
- Genres: Country, Folk rock, Acoustic
- Occupation(s): Singer-songwriter, guitarist
- Instrument(s): Guitar, piano
- Labels: Christander Records

Tim Brummett (born September 1, 1952) is a singer-songwriter and guitarist from Spokane, Washington. He released His first studio album, You Only Live Twice, on Christander Records in 2005. Some of his musical influences include Johnny Cash, Elton John, Roy Orbison, John Prine, Steve Earle, The Everly Brothers, and The Beatles.

== Musical career ==
Brummett has been playing and performing music since he was 15 years old. He chose to raise his family and put his musical dreams on hold until finally signing with Christander Records on April 5, 2005, at age 53. Brummett released his first studio album, You Only Live Twice, that same year. Following the release, several songs off his debut album reached No. 1 on various internet music charts, and the song "Share Your Load" was played on over 200 radio stations across the U.S. In early 2006 with the success of his album, Brummett teamed up with renowned fiddle player Kurt Baumer and several virtuoso acoustic musicians to form his new band, Tim Brummett and the Boomers. Tim Brummett and The Boomers went on tour throughout the Pacific Northwest in 2006, and opened for Josh Gracin on March 10, 2006, at the Knitting Factory in Spokane, Washington. Brummett eventually split apart from the band and plans to start a solo career. He stated in a myspace blog, "Well, many artists say the only way to really get good is to play solo which is why I decided to commit to it. I may play solo til the end. The connection with the audience and the way the music becomes so important is simply awesome." Brummett recently released a rough cut demo version of a new song called "Gettin Out Of Fargo" on his myspace page.

== Discography ==
=== Studio albums ===
- You Only Live Twice
