= Pir Muhammad (son of Jahangir) =

Timurid prince (c. 1376 – 1407)

- Timurid Prince

Amir of Timurid Empire
- Reign: 1405–1407
- Predecessor: Timur
- Successor: Khalil Sultan; Shahrukh Mirza
- Born: c. 1376
- Died: 22 February 1407 (aged 30-31); Afghanistan
- Burial: Gur-e-Amir, Samarkand (present-day Uzbekistan)
- Spouse: Sabur Sultan (granddaughter of Shah Shuja); Urdu mulk binti Hajji Barlas; Bekamulk aga Tughluk sultan jalair
- Issue: Qaidu; Buzanchar; Jahangir; Sanjar; Makhdum Sultan; Shah Sultan Biki; Sa'd Vakkas; Dovud; Mahdi; Xalid; Qaysar; Sulton Sanjar; Sahibjamal; Bibikhan; Fatima; Begishah; Fulana; Yadgar; Jahan sultan Payanada sultan
- House: House of Timur
- Father: Jahangir Mirza
- Mother: Bakht Malik Agha of the Yasauri
- Religion: Islam
- Military career
- Conflicts: Sack of Delhi (1398); Siege of Bhatner (1398); Siege of Multan (1398); Battle of Jammu (1399); Battle of Qara-Derrah (1395); Battle of Capakhchur; Battle of Ankara (1402)

Pir Muhammad Mirza (c. 1376 – 22 February 1407) was a Timurid prince and briefly succeeded as Amir of the Timurid Empire from 1405 to 1407, after the death of his grandfather Timur the Lame. He was the son of Jahangir Mirza who was the actual successor to the throne but had died before his father. Next in line was Umar Shaikh Mirza I but he too died. Pir Muhammad's brother Muhammad Sultan was appointed Timur's heir, but he had succumbed to battle-wounds in 1403. This left Timur with only two living sons: Shah Rukh, whom Timur considered too meek to rule, and Miran Shah, who suffered from both mental difficulties after a fall from his horse, and gout. Timur felt that neither of his sons were capable of ruling so he named Pir Muhammad as his successor.

Pir Muhammad had been Governor of Kandahar since 1392. His territory extended from the lands west of the Hindu Kush to the Indus River. In the fall of 1397 he led the first wave of Timurids into India, and was invested with the rulership of Multan. However, none of Pir Muhammad's relatives supported him following Timur's death. He was unable to assume command in Samarkand. He went into battle twice against Khalil Sultan, his cousin and fellow claimant to the throne, but was defeated. He was allowed to remain in his lands. However, six months later he was murdered by his vizier Pir Ali Taz in 1407. Shah Rukh would eventually win the succession war.

Pir Muhammad (son of Jahangir) Timurid dynasty
Preceded by Timur	Timurid Empire; 1405–1407	Succeeded by Khalil Sultan and Shahrukh Mirza
