= Jahangir Mirza (Timurid prince) =

Son of Timur (1356–1376)

Jahangir Mirza جهانگیر میرزا
- Timurid Prince
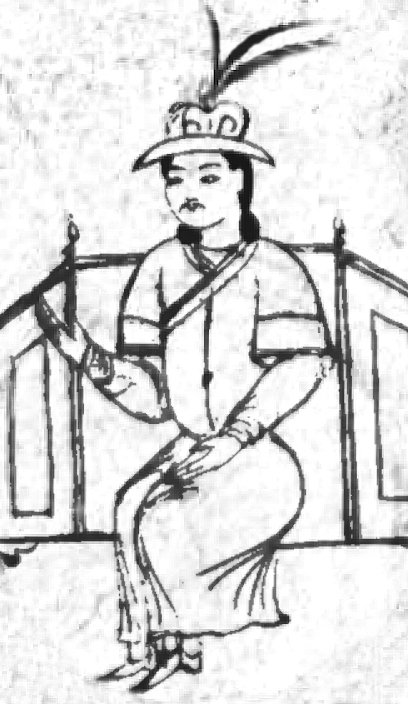
- Jahangir Mirza enthroned. Timurid genealogy, 1405–1406 (Topkapi Sarayi Müzesi, H.2152).
- Born: 1356
- Died: 1376 (aged 19–20); Samarqand (present-day Uzbekistan)
- Burial: Tomb of Jahangir, Shakhrisabz (present-day Uzbekistan)
- Wives: Ruqayya Khanike; Khanzada Begum; Bakht Malik Agha
- Issue: Muhammad Sultan Mirza; Pir Muhammad; Several others
Names
- Ghiyas-ud-din Jahangir Mirza
- House: House of Timur
- Father: Timur
- Mother: Turmish Agha
- Religion: Islam

Ghiyas-ud-din Jahangir Mirza (Persian: جهانگیر میرزا; 1356–1376), whose honorifics are given as Muʿizz al-Din ("Glorifier of the Faith") and Abu al-Qasim ("Father of Qasim"), was a member of the Timurid dynasty and a son of its founder, the Central Asian conqueror Timur. He was Timur's favourite son and served as one of his military commanders and his heir apparent. However, Jahangir died in 1376, predeceasing his father by almost thirty years.

== Birth ==
Jahangir was one of four sons of Timur who survived infancy and the only one born of a free wife. His mother Turmish Agha also gave birth to two other children; Jahanshah, who died young and a daughter, Aka Biki, who was the mother of Sultan Husayn Tayichiud.

There is some disagreement regarding whether Jahangir or his brother Umar Shaikh was the eldest of Timur's sons. The Mu’izz al-Ansab (The Glorifier of Genealogies), the most important source regarding the structure of the Timurid royal family during this period, is contradictory on this point. It states that Jahangir was the eldest, but the family of Umar Shaikh is presented first in the genealogy itself, implying that the latter was born first. Narrative sources, such as the Zafarnama by Nizam al-Din Shami, and Yazdi's book of the same name support the notion that Jahangir was younger. Woods concludes that Jahangir was probably the second of the four sons to reach adulthood, and suggests that the seniority traditionally accorded to him reflects his status as the only son born to a free wife rather than to a concubine.

== War with Moghulistan ==
Following the death of Tughlugh Timur, the Khan of the Chagatai Khanate, control of the eastern half of his territory (an area termed Moghulistan) was seized by a noble named Qamar-ud-din Dughlat. Taking advantage of the disorder, Timur, who had already conquered the western half of the khanate, led an expedition against Dughlat in 1370. By 1375, Dughlat was in continual retreat from Timur and had sheltered in the Kök-tepe Mountains. Jahangir was sent to pursue the noble through the narrow gorges between the peaks, defeating various Moghul detachments in the region along the way. Though Dughlat himself eluded capture, Jahangir was able to capture his wife, Tuman Agha, and daughter, Dilshad Agha. The latter of the two was married to Timur soon after.

== Marriages ==
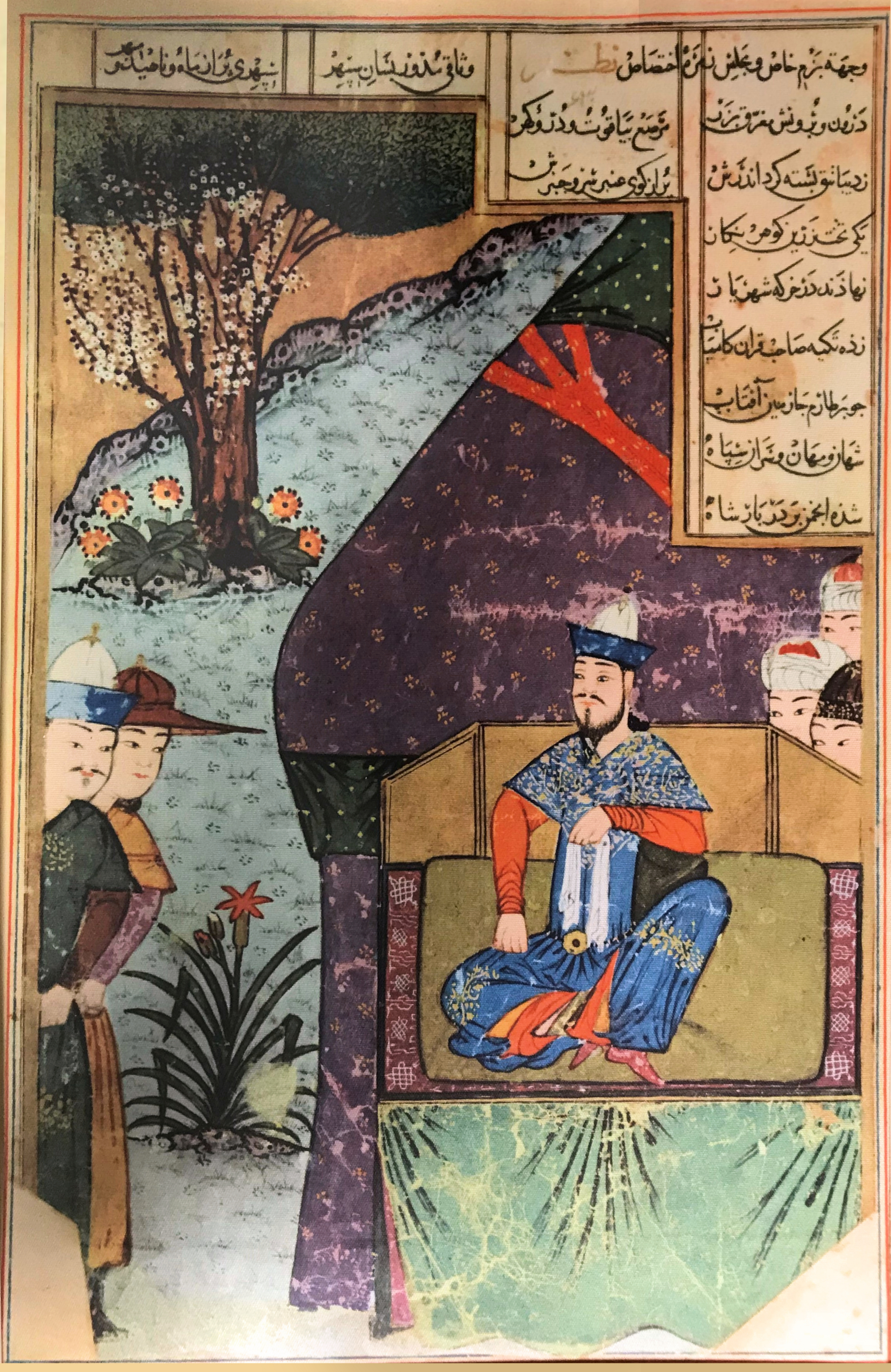
Timur chairing the marriage ceremony of Jahangir with Sevin Beg Khanzada in June 1374. Zafarnama (1436)

Jahangir's first marriage was arranged by his father in about 1367, when he was eleven years old, to Ruqayya Khanike, daughter of Amir Kai-Khusrau, the leader of the branch of the Barlas settled in Khuttal and a Chagatayid princess through her mother.

In 1372, Timur launched an invasion of the former Chagatai territory of Khorasan, then under the control of the Sufi dynasty. Though initially defiant, the ruler of the kingdom, Yusuf Sufi, eventually submitted and offered his niece Khanzada Begum in marriage to Jahangir. Khanzada was the daughter of Yusuf's brother Aq Sufi by Shakar Beg, whom most sources describe as a daughter of Öz Beg Khan of the Golden Horde, although the genealogy compiled by Husayn bn Ali-Shah instead makes her a daughter of Öz Beg's son Jani Beg.

The following year, Khanzada was sent to Timur's capital of Samarqand with a large procession carrying gifts, including gems, precious metals, silks and tapestries. She was escorted by a retinue of handmaidens and mounted soldiers, while she herself rode veiled on a white camel. The marriage itself was celebrated in the spring of 1374.

Jahangir had a son and a daughter by this marriage, Muhammad Sultan Mirza and Yadigar Sultan. He took a third wife, Bakht Malik Agha, at an unrecorded date.

== Death ==
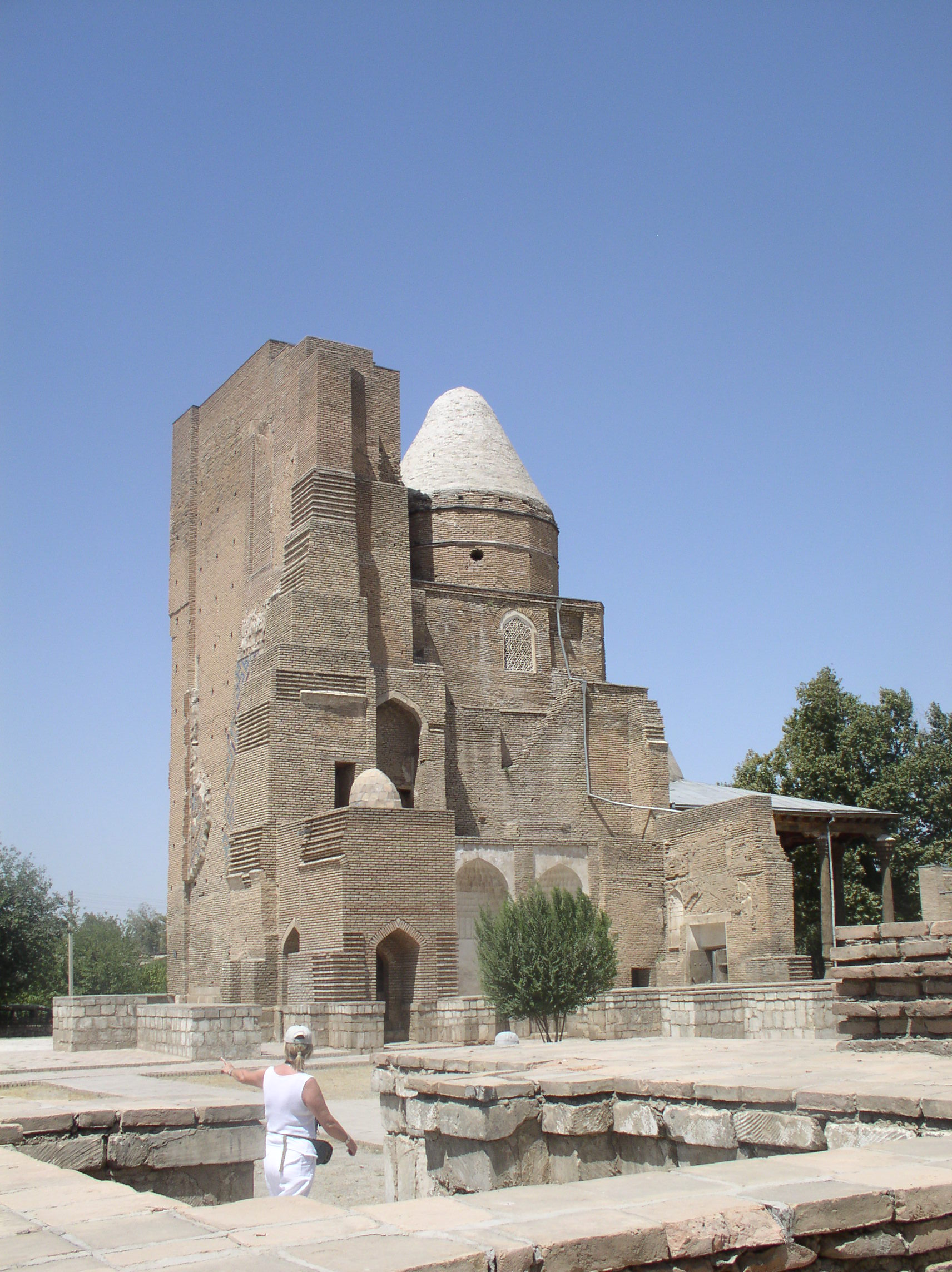
The Tomb of Jahangir in Shakhrisabz, Uzbekistan

Jahangir died of illness only two years after his marriage in 1376. Timur was reportedly inconsolable by his son's death, which caused a hiatus in his otherwise continuous military campaigns. Yazdi states that "Everything then became melancholy and disagreeable to him and his cheeks were almost always bathed in tears; he clothed himself with mourning, and his life became uneasy to him. The whole kingdom, which used to be overjoyed at the arrival of this great emperor, was turned into a place of sorrow and weeping."

He was buried in a tall edifice termed the "Tomb of Jahangir", part of the Dorussaodat mausoleum complex in modern-day Shahrisabz. Presently, the tomb is the best surviving part of the structure.

After Jahangir's death, Timur gave his widow Khanzada Begum in levirate marriage to Jahangir's younger half-brother Miran Shah, the earliest recorded instance of the practice within the Timurid family.

== Family ==
Jahangir had six children by three wives, two of whom died in infancy:

By Ruqayya Khanike, daughter of Amir Kai-Khusrau of the Khuttalani Barlas, and maternal granddaughter of Yesun Temur (married c. 1367)

- Jahan Sultan – died in infancy

By Khanzada Begum, daughter of Aq Sufi Qongirat by Shakar Beg (married 1374; afterwards remarried to Miran Shah; died 1411)

- Muhammad Sultan Mirza – born 1375
- Yadigar Sultan

By Bakht Malik Agha, daughter of Ilyas Khwaja Tatar Yasauri

- Pir Muhammad Mirza – born c. 1376
- Fatima Sultan – brought up by Timur's senior wife Saray Mulk Khanum
- Payanda Sultan – brought up by Yilduz Agha; died in infancy
