= Justin Marozzi =

English journalist, historian and travel writer (born 1970)

Justin Marozzi FRGS FRSL
- Born: 1970 (age 55–56)
- Education: University of Cambridge; Cardiff University; University of Pennsylvania
- Occupations: Journalist, historian, travel writer
- Writing career
- Subject: History
- Notable works: Baghdad: City of Peace, City of Blood
- Notable awards: Ondaatje Prize
- Website: Justin Marozzi

Justin Marozzi (born 1970) is an English journalist, historian and travel writer.

== Biography ==
Marozzi was a pupil at The King's School, Canterbury and then studied history at Gonville and Caius College, Cambridge. He graduated from the University of Cambridge in 1993 with a starred double first in history. He spent a year studying broadcast journalism at Cardiff University before winning a Thouron Award in 1994 to study for a Master's degree in Political Science at the University of Pennsylvania.

As a journalist, Marozzi worked for the BBC, the Financial Times and the Economist. He also writes for The Spectator and is a Senior Research Fellow in Journalism and the Popular Understanding of History at Buckingham University.

Marozzi is a Fellow of the Royal Geographical Society and, since 2021, of the Royal Society of Literature. He lives in Norfolk with his wife Julia and their Transylvanian rescue dog. His interests include deer stalking and classic Bristol Cars.

== Selected publications ==
- South from Barbary (2001), an account of Marozzi's travels on camel through the Libyan Sahara
- Tamerlane: Sword of Islam, Conqueror of the World (2004), a biography of the Mongol conqueror Timur
- Faces of Exploration (2006), an account of famous 20th century explorers
- The Man Who Invented History: Travels with Herodotus (2008), a biography of the world's first historian
- Baghdad: City of Peace, City of Blood (2014)
- Islamic Empires - Fifteen Cities that Define a Civilization (2019)
- A Thousand Golden Cities: 2,500 Years of Writing from Afghanistan and its People (2023)
- Captives and Companions: A History of Slavery and the Slave Trade in the Islamic World (2025)

== Awards ==
- 2015 Ondaatje Prize for Baghdad: City of Peace, City of Blood
- Shortlisted for the 2025 Baillie Gifford Prize for Captives and Companions: A History of Slavery and the Slave Trade in the Islamic World
