= Palmira Brummett =

American historian

Palmira Brummett, sometimes credited as Palmira Johnson Brummett is an American historian of Middle Eastern history. She is professor emeritus at the University of Tennessee where she previously served as a Distinguished Humanities Professor and Lindsay Young Professor. Subsequent to her tenure at UT, she was a visiting professor at Brown University from 2011-2016.

Brummett received her Bachelor of Arts and PhD from the University of Chicago in 1975 and 1988, respectively. She received a Masters in Public Health from the University of Illinois in 1981.

Brummett's writing includes: Ottoman Seapower and Levantine Diplomacy in the Age of Discovery, Image and Imperialism in the Ottoman Revolutionary Press and Civilizations Past and Present.
