= Sufi dynasty =

Turkic dynasty from western Central Asia

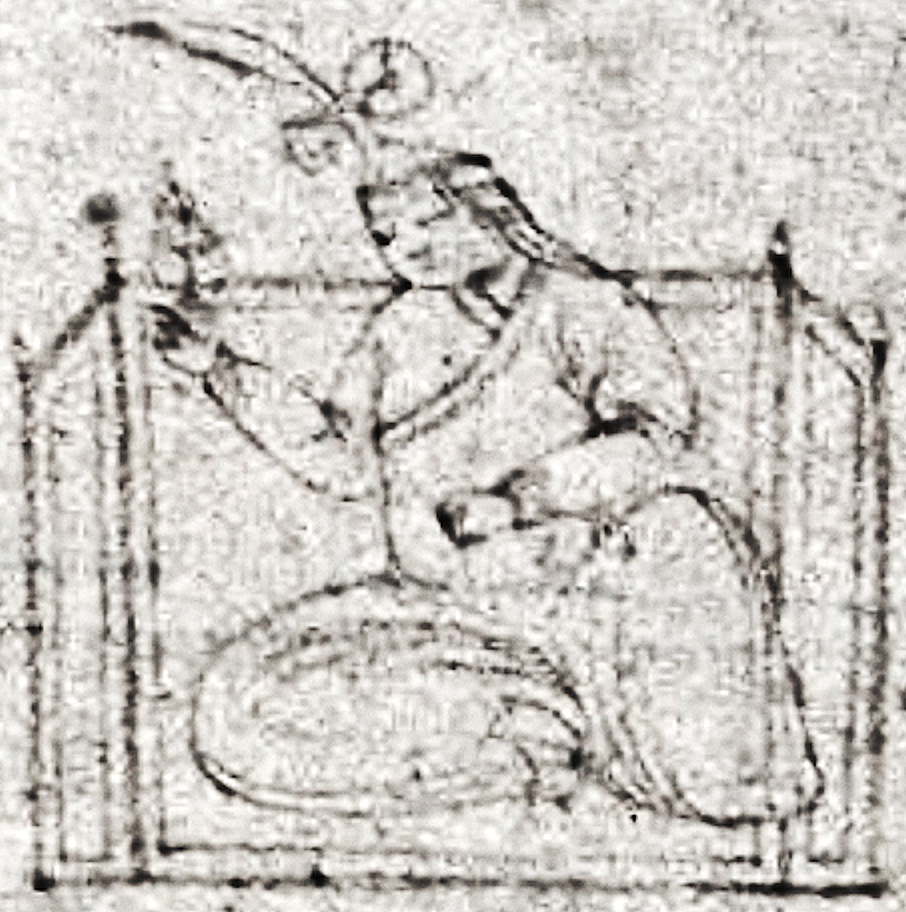
- Contemporary portrait of princess Khanzade (c. 1360 – 1411), daughter of Aq Sufi, founder of the Sufi dynasty, granddaughter of Jani Beg, and a direct descendant of Genghis Khan. Timurid genealogy 1405-1409 (Topkapi Sarayi Müzesi, H2152)
- Country: Khwarazm
- Founded: c. 1361
- Founder: Aq Sufi
- Final ruler: Sulayman
- Dissolution: 1379

The Sufid dynasty was a Turkic dynasty of Qungrad Mongolic origin that ruled in Khwarazm within the realm of the Golden Horde in the Amu Darya river delta. Although the dynasty's independence was short-lived (c. 1361 – 1379), its later members continued to rule Khwarezm intermittently as governors of the Timurid Empire until the takeover of Khwarezm by the Shaybanid Uzbeks in 1505. Unlike earlier dynasties that ruled from Khwarezm, the Sufids never used the title Khwarazmshah.

== Origins ==
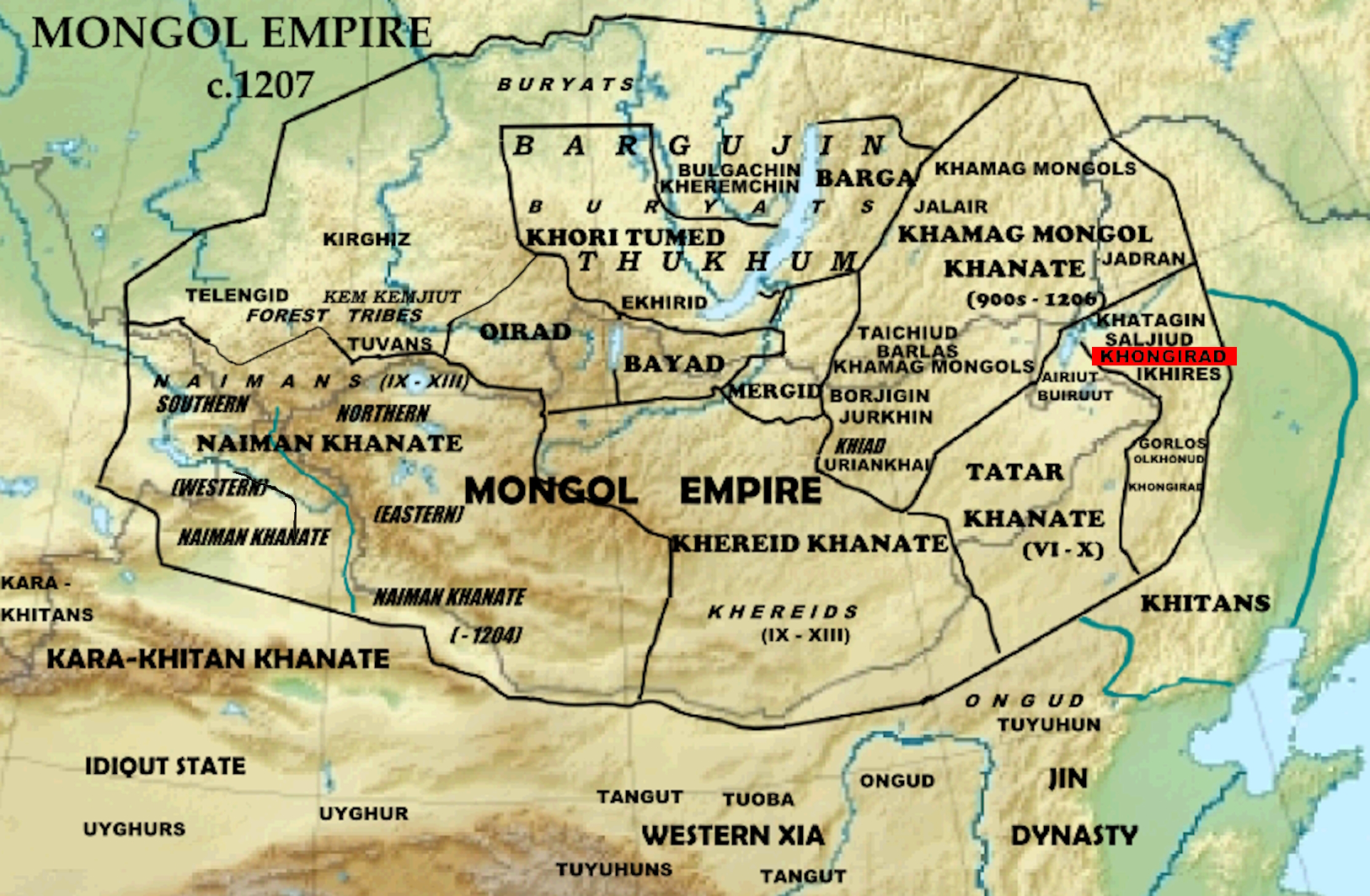
Original location of the Onggirat tribe within the Mongol Empire c. 1207

The progenitor of the Sufi dynasty was Naghday Biy, a Mongol noble and a member of the Onggirat tribe. The dynasty had several genealogical links to the Borjigin imperial family; it was descended from a brother of Genghis Khan's chief empress Börte, and both the paternal grandfather and great-grandfather of Naghday were the sons of Mongol princesses. (Note: His great-great-grandfather Chigu (son of Börte's brother Anchen) married Genghis Khan's daughter Tumalun and had a son named Togha Timur. The latter converted to Islam under the name Musa and married Taraqay Khatun, a daughter of Hulagu Khan. They were the parents of Noqay Noyan, whose son Aghaday was Naghday's father.) Initially serving as the chief army commander of Öz Beg Khan, Naghday later resigned his post and became a Sufi before migrating to Khwarezm, becoming the first Onggirat chief in the region.

== History ==
Following the Mongol invasion of the Khwarazmian Empire in 1219-1220 and the annexation of Khwarezm into the Mongol Empire, the region remained for a while under the control of the Kipchak Khanate (the "Golden Horde"). It was then conquered by Alghu, ruler of the Chagatai Khanate between 1260-64. Thereafter, the region was seemingly partitioned, between the Kipchak Khanate in the north, in the regions of the Syr Darya and Urgench, and the Chagatai in the south, in the regions of Kath and Khiva. This division remained in place until the 1350s, when the Sufid dynasty took power in Khwarezm.

=== Husain Sufi ===
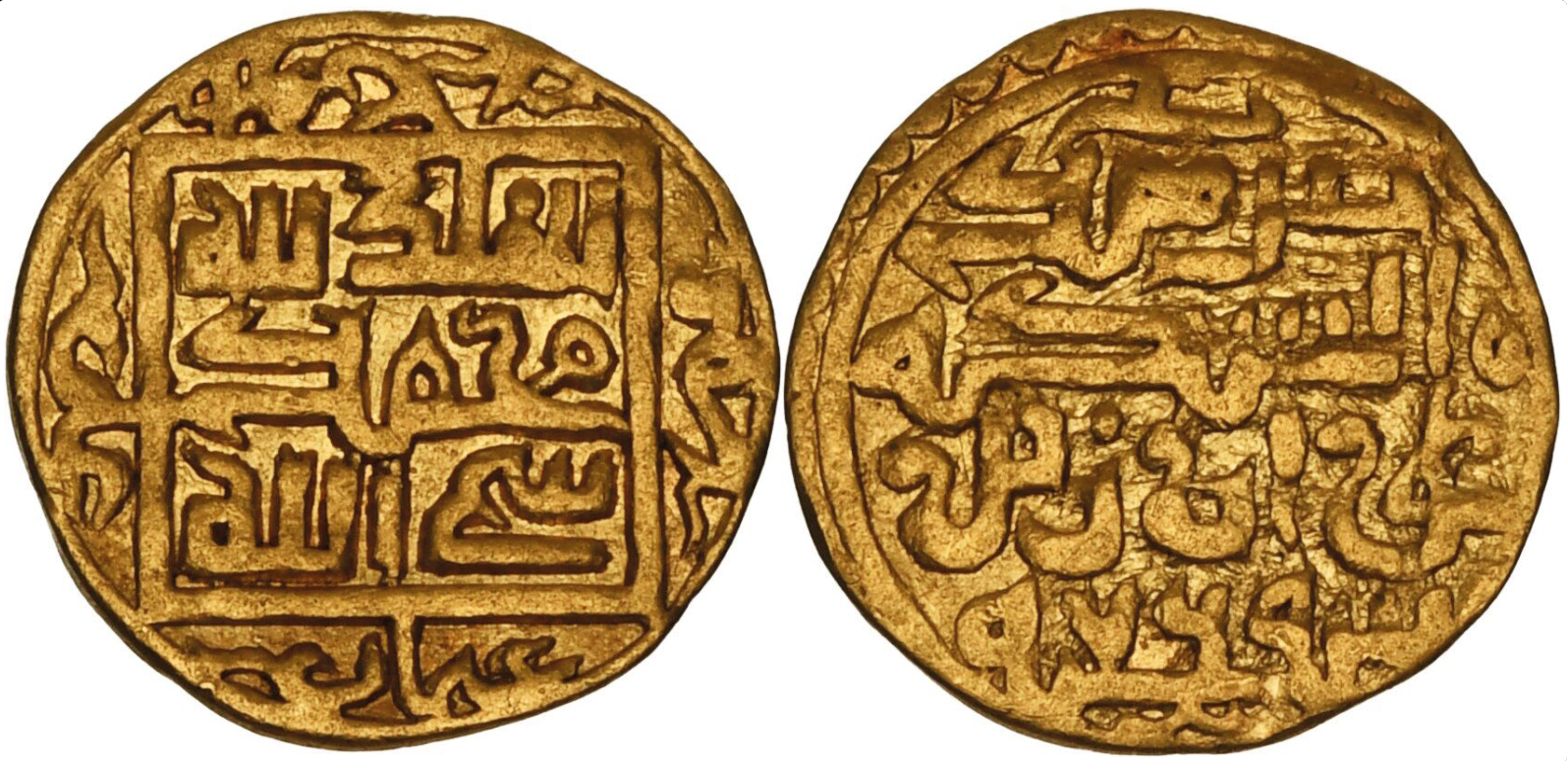
Coin of Sufid ruler Husayn, struck at the Khwarezm mint, dated 1367/8

The first Sufid ruler Husain Sufi, a son of Naghday, was a member of the Onggirat, a constituent tribe of the White Horde. Husain Sufi took control of Urgench and the rest of the northern part of Khwarezm; coins in the province were minted for him beginning in 1364. He also took advantage of the troubles plaguing Transoxiana at the time by seizing Kath and Khiva, which were allocated to the Chagatai khans.

This encroachment on what was considered to be Chagatai territory ultimately led to conflict with the amir Timur. At the time of the seizure of Kath and Khiva Transoxiana had lacked a ruler who could respond, but by 1369 Timur had unified the region under his rule. Timur, who maintained a puppet Chagatai khan, felt strong enough to demand the return of Kath and Khiva from Husain Sufi in the early 1370s.

Husain Sufi's refusal to return southern Khwarezm caused Timur to go to war against him in 1372. Kath was quickly overrun; Husain Sufi decided to fortify Urgench and remain there. Urgench was surrounded by Timur's army and Husain Sufi died during the siege.

=== Yusuf Sufi ===
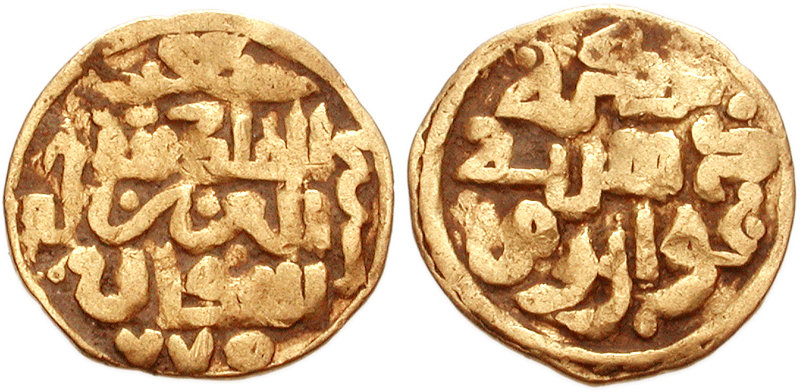
Coin of Sufid ruler Yusuf, struck at the Khwarezm mint, dated 1373/4

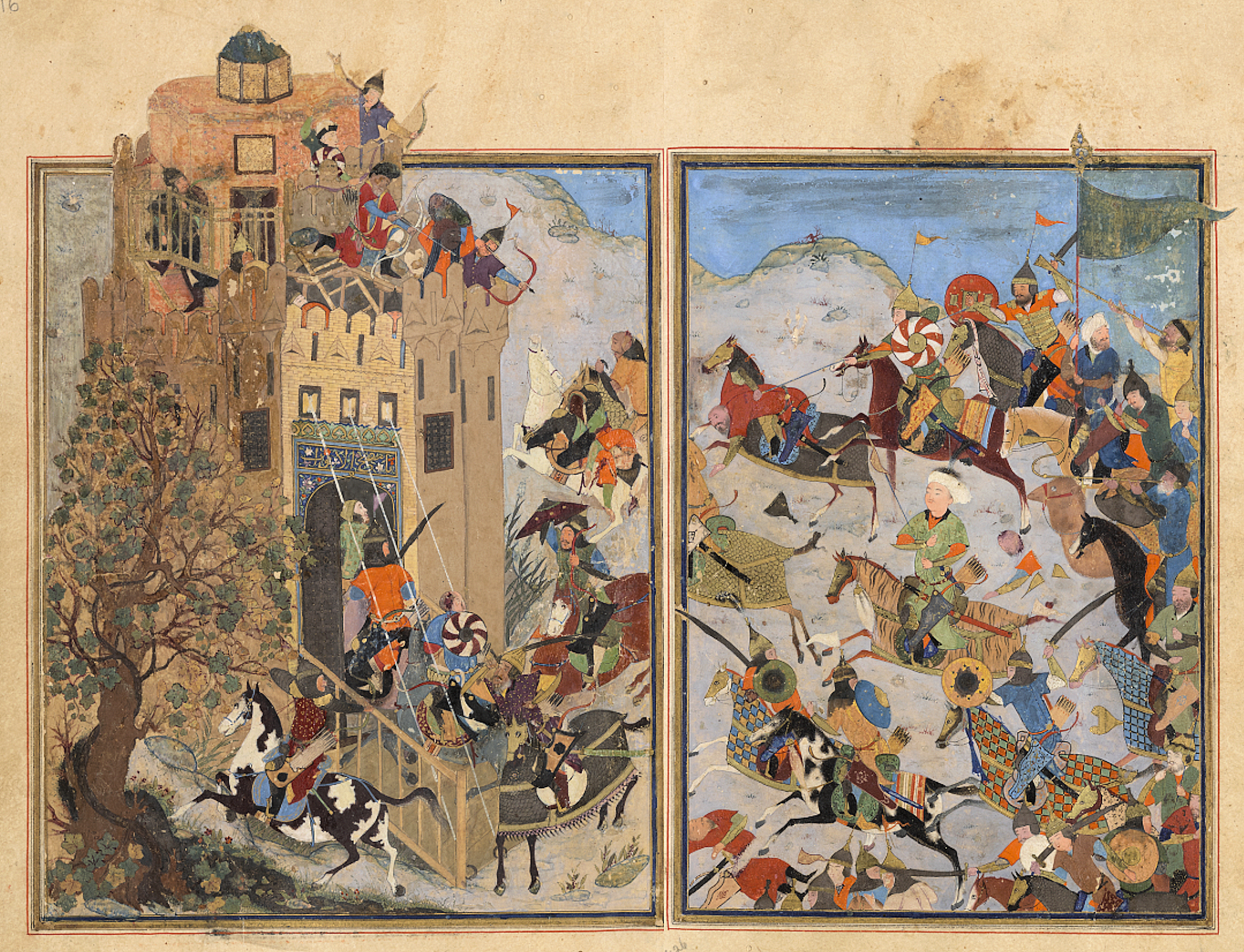
Timur's army, commanded by his son Umar Shaykh, in the Siege of Urgench (1379). Garrett Zafarnama (1480)

Husain Sufi was succeeded by his brother, Yusuf Sufi, who concluded a peace with Timur in which Timur received Kath and Khiva. Timur's army left northern Khwarezm; in the following year, however, Yusuf Sufi provoked Timur by invading his territories and trying to retake Kath and Khiva. This led Timur to undertake a second campaign against him in 1373, but Yusuf Sufi quickly sent his apologies and gave his daughter Khanzada Begum in marriage to Timur's son Jahangir in exchange for peace.

Yusuf Sufi's continuing incursions into Timur's territory prompted another invasion in 1379. This time Urgench was besieged; Yusuf Sufi died in the middle of the siege and Timur demanded the city's surrender. The city refused; as a result when Timur's army finally did capture it by force, a general massacre followed and the city was burned.

=== Suleiman Sufi ===
The Sufids' defeat at the hands of Timur did not shake their desire to retain their hold on Khwarezm. Suleiman Sufi allied with the khan of the Golden Horde, Tokhtamysh, and in 1387 revolted in concert with the khan's invasion of Transoxiana. Timur immediately took action against Suleiman Shah, overrunning Khwarezm and crushing the rebellion.

=== Later Sufids ===
Despite their loss of independence, the Sufids continued to play an influential role in the Timurid Empire. In the late 14th century one Yayïq Sufi is mentioned; a probable member of the Sufid line, Yayïq Sufi obtained a high position in Timur's army. He rebelled in 1393/4, but was defeated and imprisoned.

In the 15th century Khwarezm was usually controlled by the Timurids, although it on occasion fell into the hands of the khans of the Golden Horde as well as the Uzbeks. The Sufids retained some power in the province, with individual members acting as governors for the powers of the region. In 1464 an 'Uthman b. Muhammad Sufi is mentioned. In 1505, a Chin Sufi was in charge of the province, but in that year the Uzbek Muhammad Shaybani invaded Khwarezm and annexed the province. Uzbek Khanate was defeated by Safavids and Khwarezm was occupied by Persians between 1510 and 1511. Finally, Uzbeks and Turkmens won independence war of 2 years against them and founded second Uzbek state, Khanate of Khiva.

== Rulers ==
- Aq Sufii (1359–1361)
- Husain (1361–1372)
- Yusuf (1372–1379)
- Balankhi (1380)
- Maing (1380)
- Sulayman (1380–1388)

== See also ==
- List of medieval Mongol tribes and clans
- Turkic peoples

== Sources ==
- Ashrafyan, K.Z. (1999). "Central Asia under Timur from 1370 to the early fifteenth century". In Asimov, M.S.; Bosworth, C.E. (eds.). History of civilizations of Central Asia. Vol. IV Part 1. New Delhi: Motilal Banarsidass. ISBN 81-208-1595-5.
- Bosworth, Clifford Edmund (1978). "Khwarazm". The Encyclopedia of Islam. Vol. IV. Leiden: E. J. Brill. ISBN 90-04-05745-5.
- Bregel, Yuri (1982). "Tribal tradition and dynastic history: The early rulers of the Qongirats according to Munis". Asian and African Studies. 16 (3).
- DeWeese, Devin A. (1994). Islamization and Native Religion in the Golden Horde. Pennsylvania State University. ISBN 0-271-01073-8.
- Grousset, René (1970). The Empire of the Steppes: A History of Central Asia. Rutgers University Press. pp. 420–421. ISBN 978-0-8135-1304-1.
- Hildinger, Erik (1997). Warriors of the Steppe: A Military History of Central Asia, 500 B.C. to 1700 A.D. Da Capo.
- Manz, Beatrice Forbes (1989). The Rise and Rule of Tamberlane. Cambridge University. ISBN 0-521-63384-2.
