= Ismail I =

Shah of Safavid Iran from 1501 to 1524

- Shahanshah-e Iran; Morshed-e Kamel
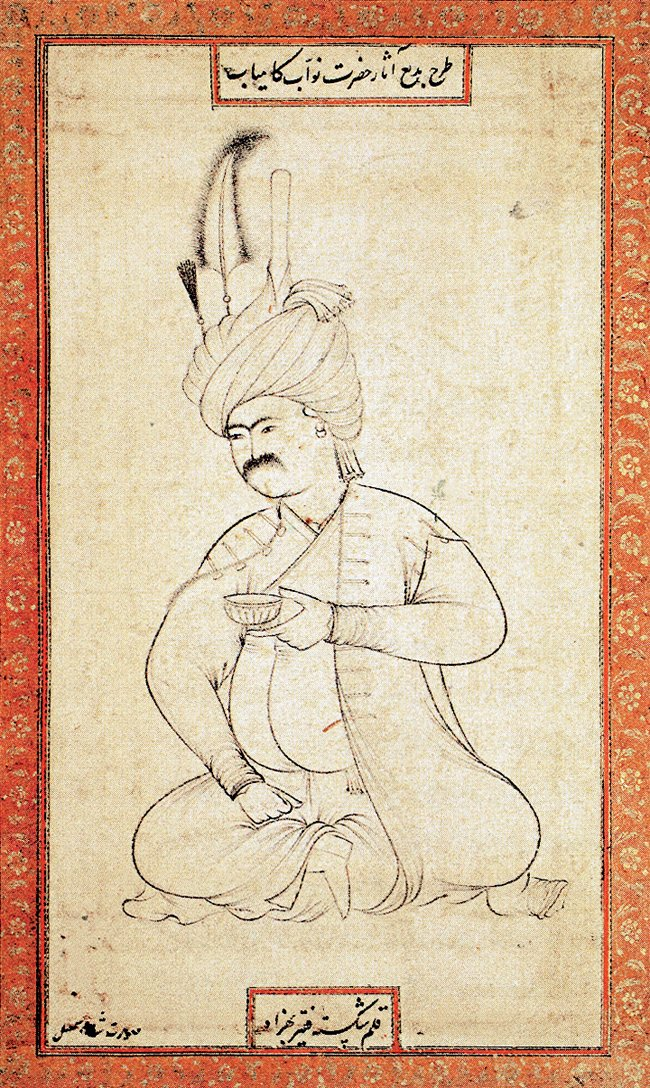
- Portrait of Shah Ismail I, painted from life by Kamal al-din Behzad, his director of the royal atelier (posthumous copy). Topkapı Palace Museum, H.2169.

Shah of Iran
- Reign: 22 December 1501 – 23 May 1524
- Successor: Tahmasp I
- Viziers: See list: Amir Zakariya Mahmud Jan Daylami Najm-e Sani Abd al-Baqi Yazdi Mirza Shah Hossein Jalal al-Din Mohammad Tabrizi

8th Sheikh of the Safavid order
- In office 1494 – 23 May 1524
- Preceded by: Ali Mirza Safavi
- Succeeded by: Tahmasp I
- Born: 17 July 1487; Ardabil, Aq Qoyunlu
- Died: 23 May 1524 (aged 36); Near Tabriz, Safavid Iran
- Burial: Sheikh Safi Shrine Ensemble, Ardabil, Iran
- Consorts: Tajlu Khanum; Khanbegi khanum Behruzeh Khanum
- Issue Among others: Tahmasp I Sam Mirza; Alqas Mirza; Bahram Mirza; Pari Khan Khanum; Mahinbanu Khanum
Names
- Abu'l-Moẓaffar Ismā'īl ibn Shaykh Ḥaydar ibn Shaykh Junayd
Regnal name
- Shah Ismail I
- Dynasty: Safavid
- Father: Shaykh Haydar
- Mother: Halima Begum
- Religion: Twelver Shia Islam
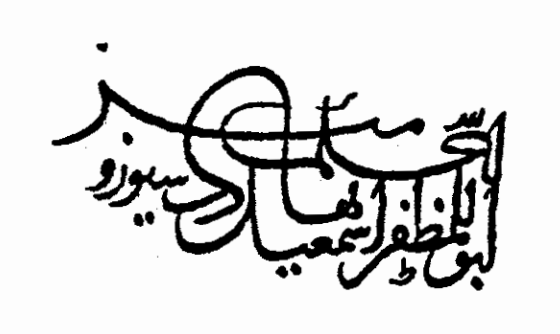
- Signature
- Military career
- Conflicts: Treelike list: Safavid conquest of Shirvan; Battle of Jabani; Battle of Gulistan; Siege of Baku; Safavid - Aq Qoyunlu Wars; Battle of Sharur; Battle of Hamadan (1503); Siege of Tabriz (1501); Capture of Erzincan; Capture of Erzurum; Conquest of Armenia; Conquest of Fars; Conquest of Persian Iraq; Capture of Kerman; Capture of Nakhchivan; Conquest of Yazd; Conquest of Diyarbakir; Safavid conquest of Arab Iraq; Battle of Baghdad (1508); Safavid–Mamluk Hostility; Battle of Diyarbakir (1511); Persian–Uzbek wars; Battle of Marv; Mokri uprising; Turkoman invasions of Georgia; Ottoman–Persian Wars; Şahkulu rebellion; Battle of Chaldiran; Campaign of Trabzon (1505); Battle of Erzincan (1507); Campaign of Trabzon (1510); Capture of Bayburt (1514); Siege of Kemah; Battle of Teleti

Ismail I (Note: Persian: اسماعیل یکم, romanized: Ismāʿīl) (17 July 1487 – 23 May 1524) was the founder and first shah of Safavid Iran, ruling from 1501 until his death in 1524. His reign is one of the most vital in the history of Iran, marking the beginning of Iran’s transformation from a majority Sunni Muslim country into a majority Shia Muslim state through a policy of forced conversion. The Safavid era is often considered the beginning of modern Iranian history. Under Ismail, Iran was unified under native rule for the first time since the Islamic conquest of the country eight-and-a-half centuries earlier.

Ismail inherited leadership of the Safavid Sufi order from his brother as a child. His predecessors had transformed the religious order into a military movement supported by the Qizilbash (mainly Turkoman Shiite groups). The Safavids took control of northwestern Iran, with Tabriz as the capital. In 1501, Ismail was crowned as shah (king). In the following years, Ismail conquered the rest of Iran and other neighbouring territories. His expansion into Eastern Anatolia brought him into conflict with the Ottoman Empire. In 1514, the Ottomans decisively defeated the Safavids at the Battle of Chaldiran, which brought an end to Ismail's conquests. Ismail fell into depression and heavy drinking after this defeat and died in 1524. He was succeeded by his eldest son Tahmasp I.

One of Ismail's first actions was the proclamation of the Twelver denomination of Shia Islam as the official religion of the Safavid state, marking one of the most important turning points in the history of Islam, which had major consequences for the ensuing history of Iran. He caused sectarian tensions in the Middle East when he destroyed the tombs of the Abbasid caliphs, the Sunni Imam Abu Hanifa, and the Sufi Muslim ascetic Abdul Qadir Gilani in 1508.

The dynasty founded by Ismail I would rule for over two centuries, being one of the greatest Iranian empires and at its height being amongst the most powerful empires of its time, ruling all of present-day Iran, the Republic of Azerbaijan, Armenia, most of Georgia, the North Caucasus, and Iraq, as well as parts of modern-day Turkey, Syria, Pakistan, Afghanistan, Uzbekistan, and Turkmenistan. It also reasserted Iranian identity in large parts of Greater Iran. The legacy of the Safavid Empire was also the revival of Iran as an economic stronghold between the East and the West, the establishment of a bureaucratic state, its architectural innovations, and patronage for fine arts.

Ismail I was also a prolific poet who under the pen name Khaṭāʾī (Note: Arabic: خطائي, lit. 'the wrongful') contributed to the literary development of a southern Turkic dialect, which is often called Ajami Turkic and seen as a precursor to the Azerbaijani language. He also contributed to Persian literature, though few of his Persian writings survive.

== Origins ==
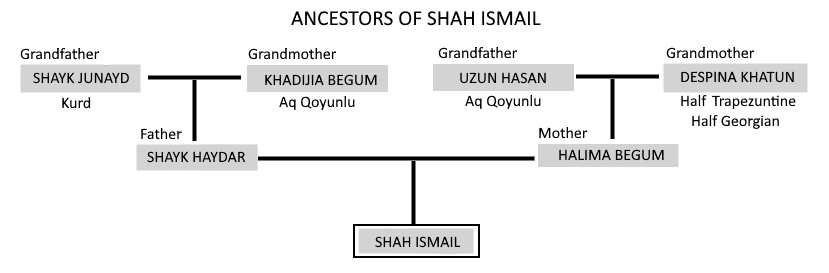
Family tree of Shah Ismail.

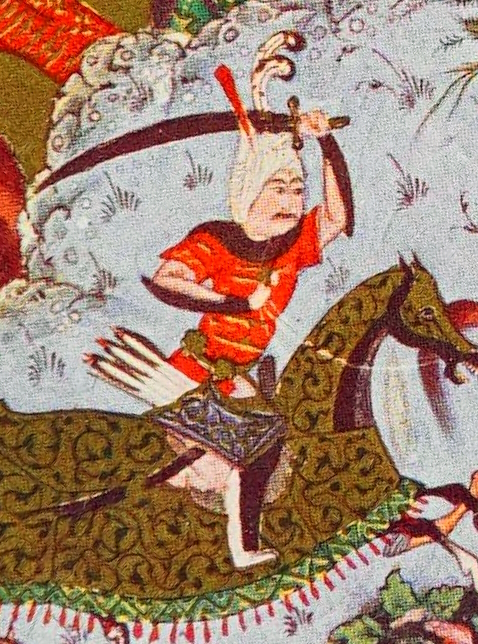
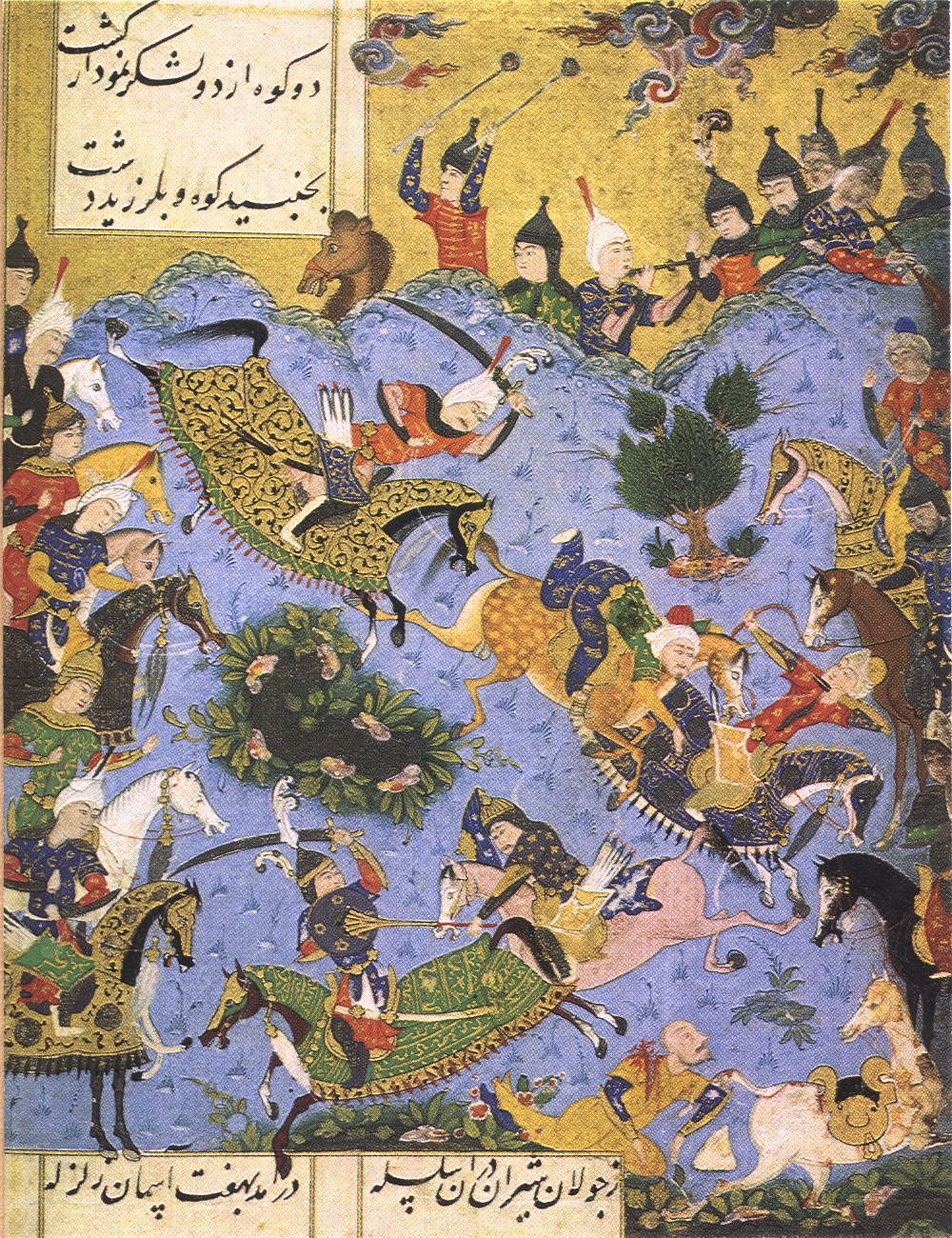
Shāh Ismaʿīl in the Safavid conquest of Shirvan (1501), according to the Shāhnāmah Shāh Ismaʿīl (Tabriz, 1541), a panegyric history he himself commissioned.

Ismail I was born to Shaykh Haydar and his wife Halima Begum on 17 July 1487, in Ardabil. His father Shaykh Haydar, who was born to Shaykh Junayd and the Aq Qoyunlu princess Khadija Begum, was the sheikh of the Safavid tariqa (Sufi order) and a direct descendant of its likely Kurdish founder, Safi-ad-Din Ardabili (1252–1334). In 1301, Safi-ad-Din had assumed the leadership of the Zahediyeh, a significant Sufi order in Gilan, from his spiritual master and father-in-law Zahed Gilani. The order was later known as the Safavid. Ismail also proclaimed himself the Mahdi and a reincarnation of Ali. Ismail was the last in this line of hereditary Grand Masters of the order, prior to his founding of a ruling dynasty.

His mother Halima Begum was the daughter of Uzun Hasan, the ruler of the Turkoman Aq Qoyunlu dynasty, by his Pontic Greek wife Theodora Megale Komnene, better known as Despina Khatun. Despina Khatun was the daughter of Emperor John IV of Trebizond. She had married Uzun Hassan in a deal to protect the Empire of Trebizond from the Ottoman Turks. Ismail was a great-great-grandson of Emperor Alexios IV of Trebizond.

Roger Savory suggests that Ismail's family was of Iranian origin, likely from Iranian Kurdistan, and later moved to Azerbaijan where they, alongside Persian, adopted the form of Turkic spoken there. Ismail spoke both Persian and a Southern Turkic dialect, a precursor of modern Azeri Turkic, in which he wrote much of his poetry, as it was aimed at his Turkic qizilbash followers in order to spread his views, while also often writing in Persian. His ancestry was mixed, because his Iranian (likely Kurdish) ancestors often intermarried with Turkmen, Byzantine Greek, and Georgian princesses to form alliances (such as his mother Halima Begum, paternal grandmother Khadija Begum and his maternal grandmother Theodora Megale Komnene).

The Safavids have been described by some as "Turkamans of remote Kurdish descent", and the Safavid conquest was described by a few as "the third Türkmen wave" to hit Iran, after the Seljuks and the Qara Qoyunlu/ Aq Qoyunlu. However, the overwhelming majority of scholars agree that the resulting empire was an Iranian one, and the state was again officially designated as "Iran" after a lapse of several centuries.

A fabricated genealogy developed by the Safavids claimed that Sheikh Safi (the founder of the order and Ismael's ancestor) was a lineal descendant of the Seventh Twelver Shia Imam and therefore of Imam Ali and the Prophet Mohammad.

== Early years ==
In 1488, Ismail's father was killed in a battle at Tabasaran against the forces of the Shirvanshah Farrukh Yassar and his overlord, the Aq Qoyunlu, a Turkic tribal federation which controlled most of Iran. In 1494, the Aq Qoyunlu captured Ardabil, killing Ali Mirza Safavi, the eldest son of Haydar, and forcing the seven-year-old Ismail to go into hiding in Gilan, where under the Kar-Kiya ruler Soltan-Ali Mirza, he received education under the guidance of scholars.

When Ismail reached the age of twelve, he came out of hiding and returned to what is now Iranian Azerbaijan along with his followers. Ismail's rise to power was made possible by the Turkoman tribes of Anatolia and Azerbaijan, who formed the most important part of the Qizilbash movement.

It is often assumed that Ismail led the Safavid movement to victory by himself, even though he was only twelve years old when he emerged from hiding to begin his conquests and not older than fourteen when he was crowned Shah. In fact, a group of seven advisers known as the ahl-i ikhtisas directed the Safavid revolution.

== Reign ==
=== Conquest of Iran and its surroundings ===
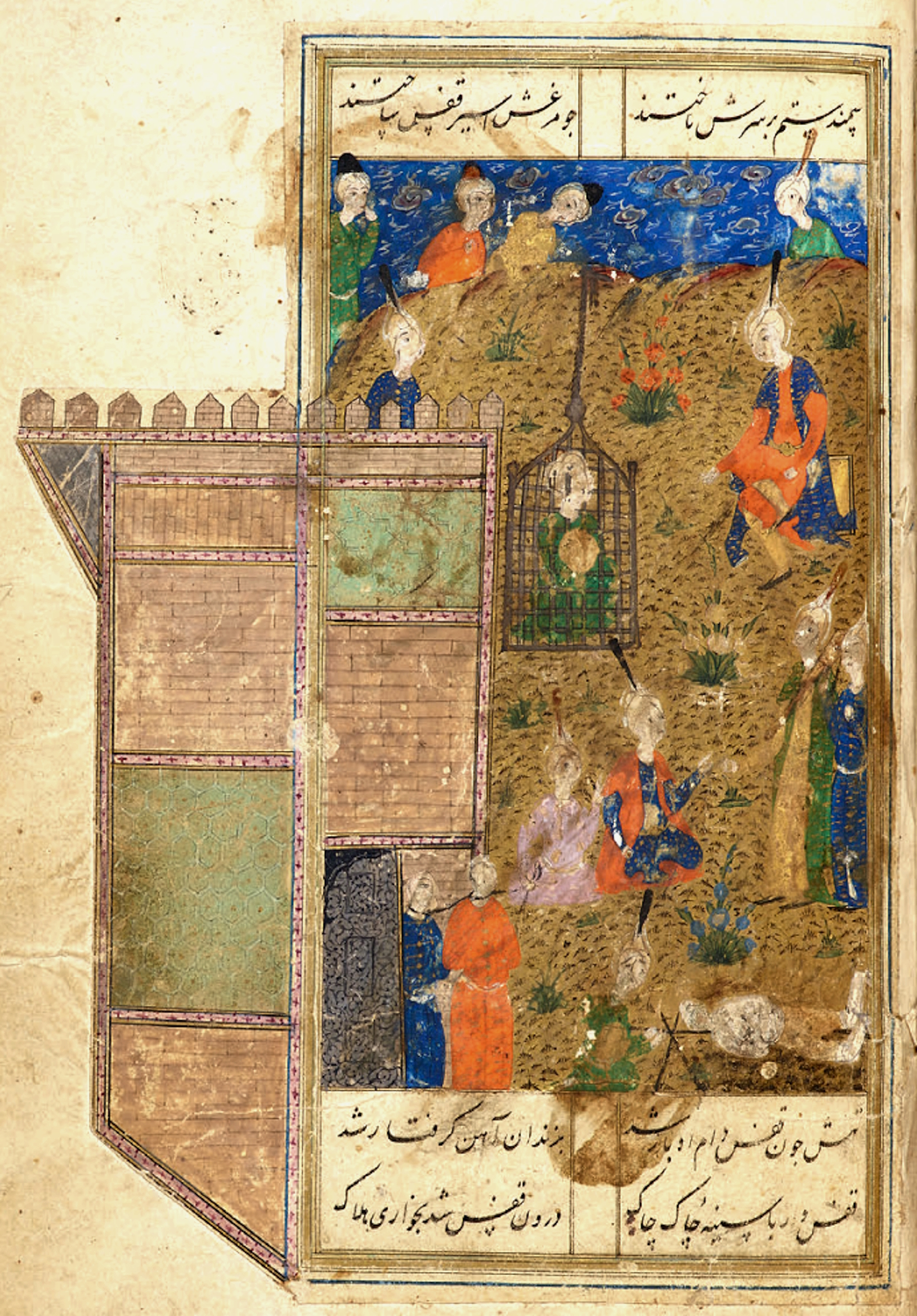
The capture of Firuzkuh by the Safavids in 1504. Shah Ismail seated, looking at his enemy Kiya Husayn II suspended in a cage, while the Aq Qoyunlu general Murad Beg Jahanshahlu roasts on a spit. Shahnama-yi i Ismaʻil (Tabriz, 1540).

In the summer of 1500, Ismail rallied about 7,000 Qizilbash troops at Erzincan, including members of the Ustajlu, Rumlu, Takkalu, Dhu'l-Qadar, Afshar, Qajar, and Varsaq tribes. Qizilbash forces passed over the Kura River in December 1500 and marched towards the Shirvanshah's state. They defeated the forces of the Shirvanshah Farrukh Yassar near Cabanı (present-day Shamakhi Rayon, Azerbaijan Republic) or at Gulistan (present-day Gülüstan, Goranboy, Azerbaijan), and subsequently went on to conquer Baku. Thus, Shirvan and its dependencies (up to southern Dagestan in the north) were now Ismail's. The Shirvanshah line nevertheless continued to rule Shirvan under Safavid suzerainty until 1538, when, during the reign of Ismail's son, Tahmasp I (r. 1524–1576), it was placed under the rule of a Safavid governor. After the conquest, Ismail had Alexander I of Kakheti send his son Demetre to Shirvan to negotiate a peace agreement.

The successful conquest alarmed the ruler of the Aq Qoyunlu, Alvand, who subsequently proceeded north from Tabriz and crossed the Aras River in order to challenge the Safavid forces. Both sides met at the Battle of Sharur, which Ismail's army won despite being outnumbered by four to one. Shortly before his attack on Shirvan, Ismail had made the Georgian kings Constantine II and Alexander I of the kingdoms of Kartli and Kakheti, respectively, attack the Ottoman possessions near Tabriz, on the promise that he would cancel the tribute that Constantine was forced to pay to the Aq Qoyunlu once Tabriz was captured. After eventually conquering Tabriz and Nakhchivan, Ismail broke the promise he had made to Constantine II and made the kingdoms of Kartli and Kakheti both his vassals.

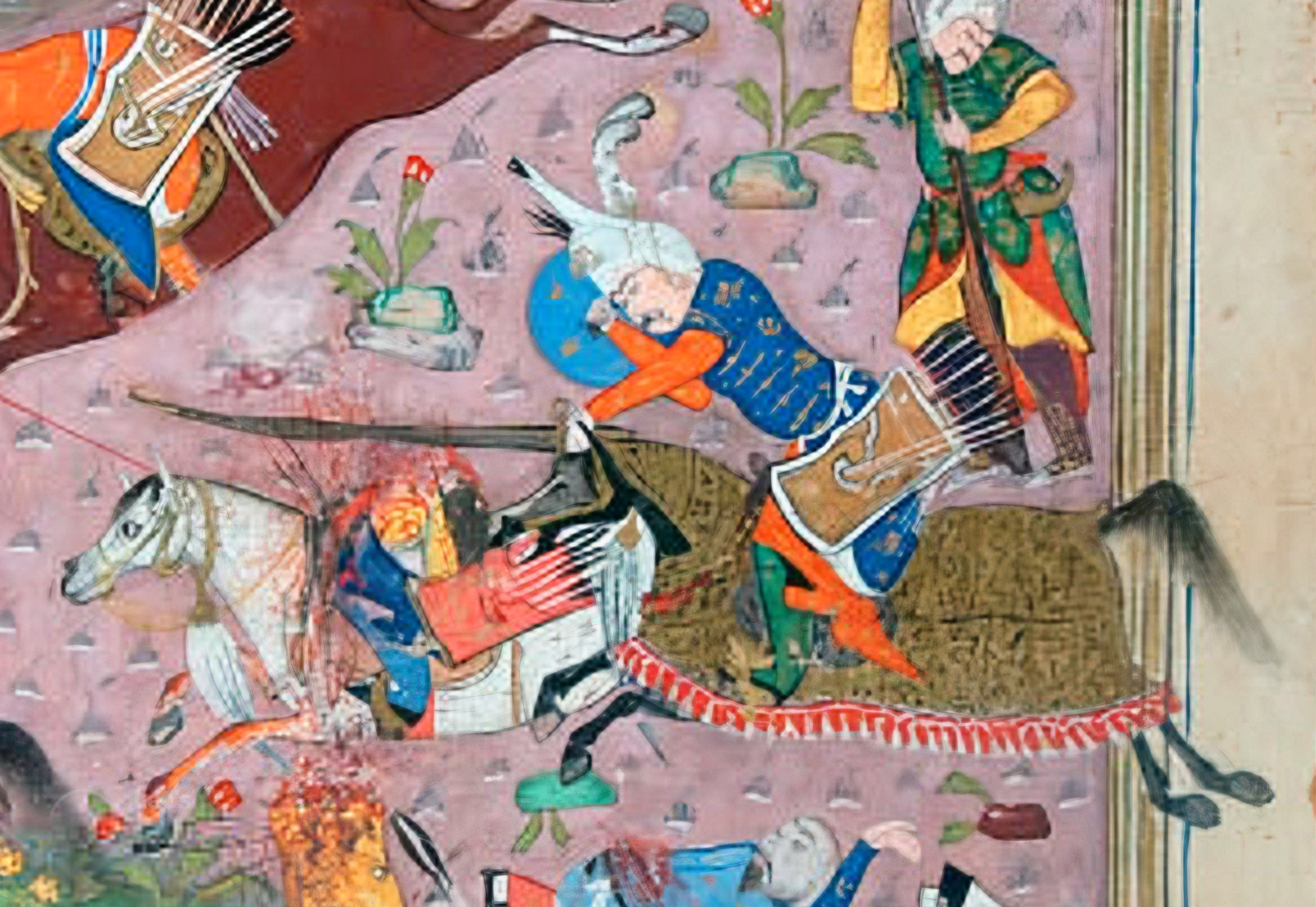
Shāh Ismaʿīl in battle circa 1510. Shāhnāmah Shāh Ismaʿīl (Tabriz, 1541)

In July 1501, following his occupation of Tabriz, Ismail took the title Pādshāh-i Irān (King of Iran). He appointed his former guardian and mentor Husayn Beg Shamlu as the vakil (vicegerent) of the empire and the commander-in-chief (amir al-umara) of the Qizilbash army. His army was composed of tribal units, the majority of which were Turkmen from Anatolia and Syria with the remainder Kurds and Chagatai. He also appointed a former Iranian vizier of the Aq Qoyunlu named Amir Zakariya as his vizier. After proclaiming himself Shah, Ismail also proclaimed Twelver Shi'ism to be the official and compulsory religion of Iran. He enforced this new standard by the sword, dissolving Sunni Brotherhoods and executing anyone who refused to comply to the newly implemented Shi'ism.

Qasem Beg Hayati Tabrizi (fl. 1554), a poet and bureaucrat of early Safavid era, states that he had heard from several witnesses that Shah Ismail's enthronement took place in Tabriz immediately after the Battle of Sharur on 1 Jumada al-Thani 907 / 22 December 1501, making Hayati's book entitled Tarikh (1554) the only known narrative source to give the exact date of Shah Ismail's ascent to the throne.

After defeating an Aq Qoyunlu army in 1502, Ismail took the title of "Shah of Iran". In the same year he gained possession of Erzincan and Erzurum, while a year later, in 1503, he conquered Eraq-e Ajam and Fars in the Battle of Hamadan (1503). One year later he conquered Mazandaran, Gorgan, and Yazd.

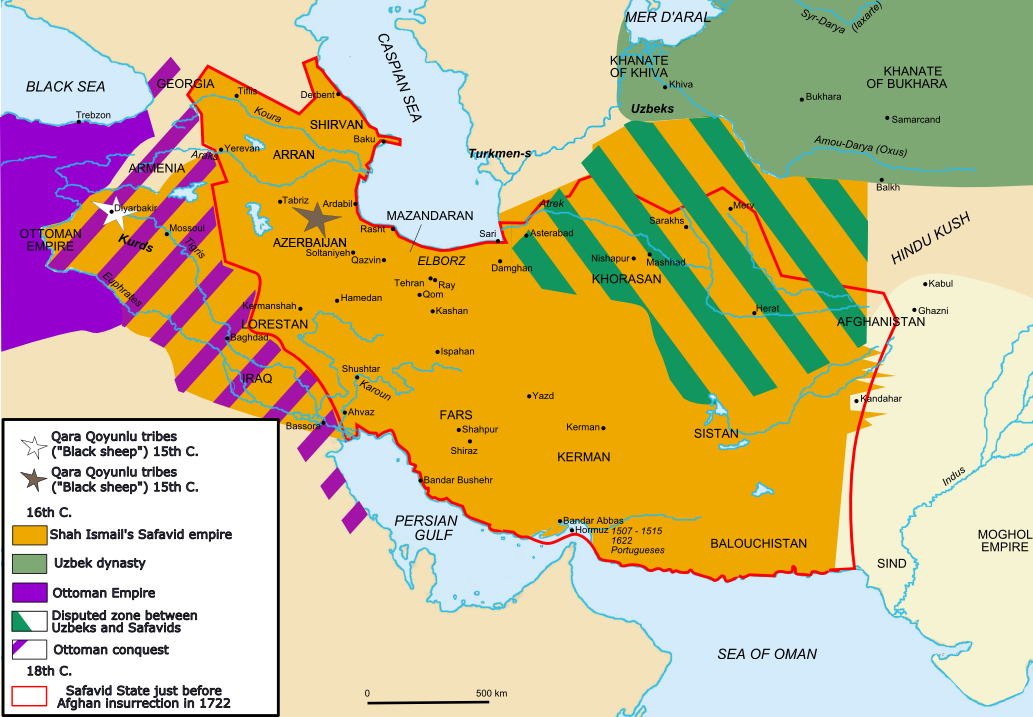
Shah Ismail's empire

In 1507, he conquered Diyarbakır. During the same year, Ismail appointed the Iranian Amir Najm al-Din Mas'ud Gilani as the new vakil. This was because Ismail had begun favoring the Iranians more than the Qizilbash, who, although they had played a crucial role in Ismail's campaigns, possessed too much power and were no longer considered trustworthy. One year later, Ismail forced the rulers of Khuzestan, Lorestan, and Kurdistan to become his vassals. The same year, Ismail and Husayn Beg Shamlu seized Baghdad, putting an end to the Aq Qoyunlu. Ismail then began destroying Sunni sites in Baghdad, including the tombs of Abbasid Caliphs and tombs of Imam Abu Hanifah and Abdul Qadir Gilani.

By 1510, he had conquered the whole of Iran (including Shirvan), southern Dagestan (with its important city of Derbent), Mesopotamia, Armenia, Khorasan, and Eastern Anatolia, and had made the Georgian kingdoms of Kartli and Kakheti his vassals. In the same year, Husayn Beg Shamlu lost his office as commander-in-chief in favor of a man of humble origins, Mohammad Beg Ustajlu. Ismail also appointed Najm-e Sani as the new vakil of the empire due to the death of Mas'ud Gilani.

Ismail I moved against the Uzbeks. In the Battle of Merv (1510), some 17,000 Qizilbash warriors trapped an Uzbek force. The Uzbek ruler, Muhammad Shaybani, was caught and killed trying to escape the battle, and the shah had his skull made into a jewelled drinking goblet. In 1512, Najm-e Sani was killed during a clash with the Uzbeks, which made Ismail appoint Abd al-Baqi Yazdi as the new vakil of the empire.

=== War against the Ottomans ===
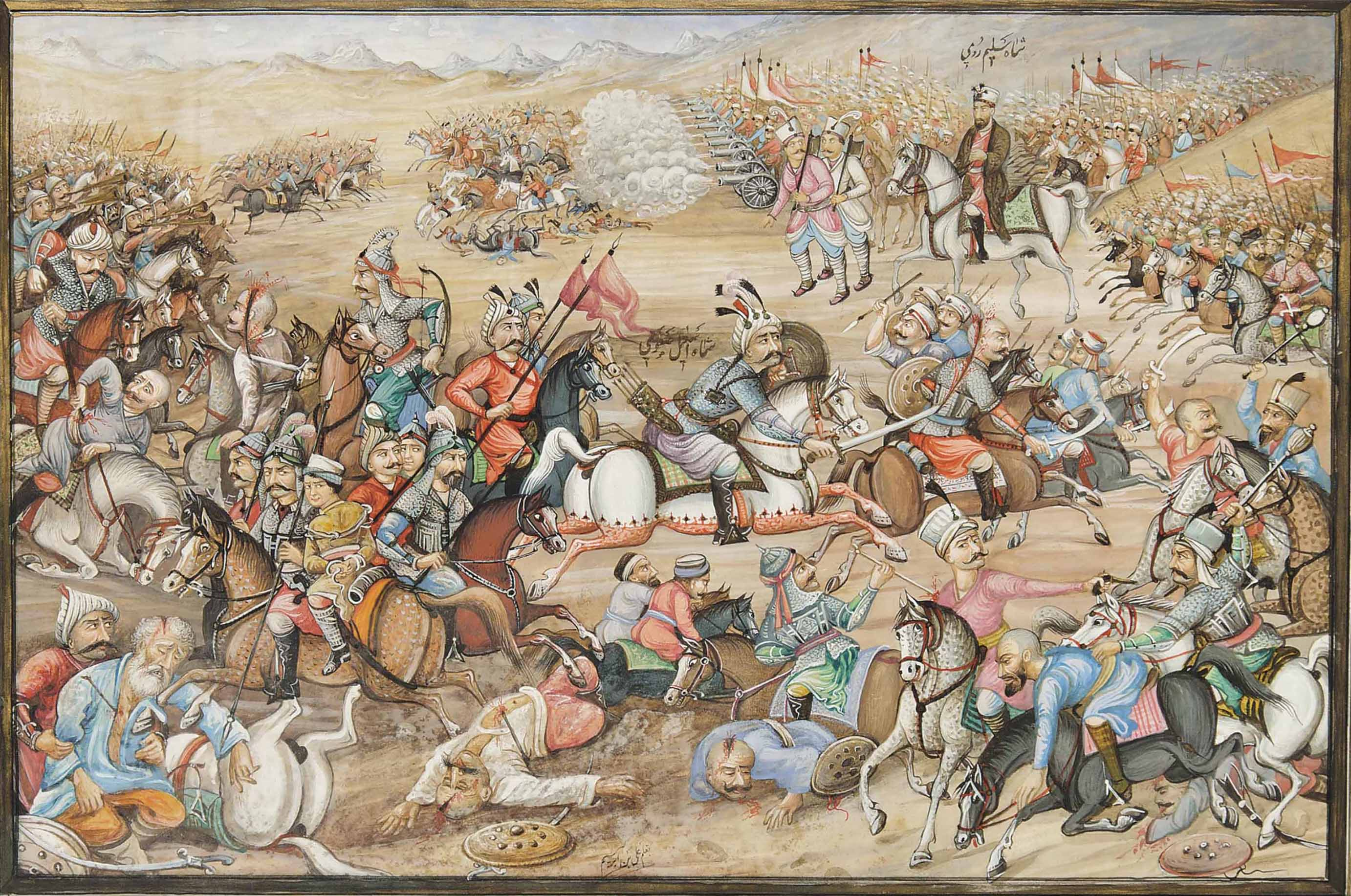
Shah Ismail (center) leading a charge during the Safavid defeat against the Ottomans at the Battle of Chaldiran (1514). Painting of the Qajar period, 19th century

The active recruitment of support for the Safavid cause among the Turcoman tribes of Eastern Anatolia, among tribesmen who were Ottoman subjects, had inevitably placed the neighbouring Ottoman empire and the Safavid state on a collision course. As the Encyclopædia Iranica states, "As orthodox or Sunni Muslims, the Ottomans had reason to view with alarm the progress of Shīʿī ideas in the territories under their control, but there was also a grave political danger that the Ṣafawīya, if allowed to extend its influence still further, might bring about the transfer of large areas in Asia Minor from Ottoman to Persian allegiance". By the early 1510s, Ismail's rapidly expansionist policies had made the Safavid border in Asia Minor shift even further west. In 1511, there was a widespread pro-Safavid rebellion in southern Anatolia by the Takkalu Qizilbash tribe, known as the Şahkulu Rebellion, and an Ottoman army that was sent in order to put down the rebellion down was defeated. A large-scale incursion into Eastern Anatolia by Safavid ghazis under Nur-Ali Khalifa coincided with the accession of Sultan Selim I in 1512 to the Ottoman throne. Such incursions were one of the reasons for Selim's decision to invade Safavid Iran two years later. Selim and Ismail had been exchanging a series of belligerent letters prior to the attack. While the Safavid forces were at Chaldiran and planning on how to confront the Ottomans, Mohammad Khan Ustajlu, who served as the governor of Diyarbakır, and Nur-Ali Khalifa, a commander who knew how the Ottomans fought, proposed that they should attack as quickly as possible. This proposal was rejected by the powerful Qizilbash officer Durmish Khan Shamlu, who rudely said that Mohammad Khan Ustajlu was only interested in the province which he governed. The proposal was rejected by Ismail himself, who said; "I am not a caravan-thief; whatever is decreed by God, will occur."

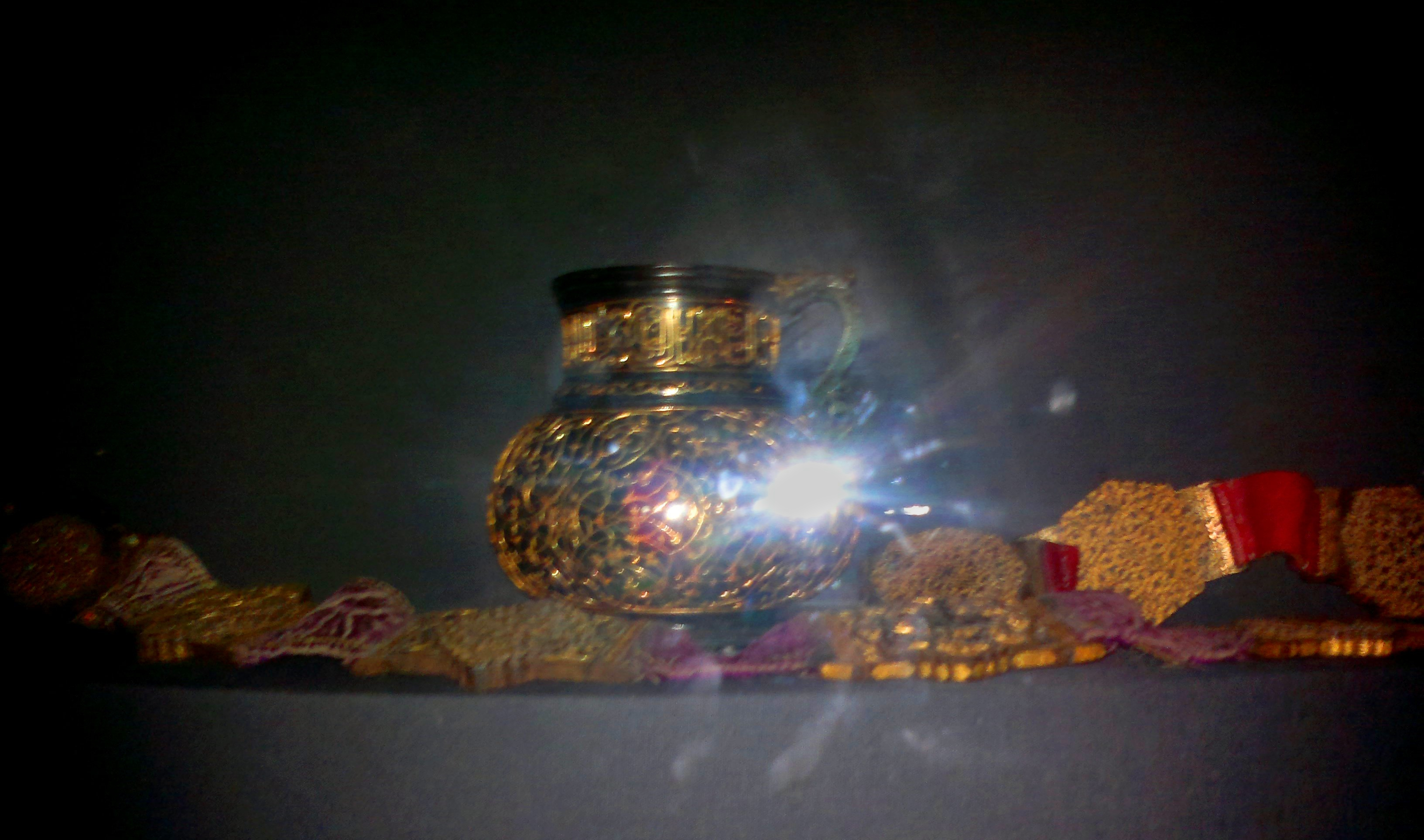
Personal items of Shah Ismail I captured by Selim I at Shah Ismaʾil’s palace in Tabriz in 1514 after the Battle of Chaldiran. Topkapi Museum, Istanbul.

Selim I eventually defeated Ismail at the Battle of Chaldiran in 1514. Ismail's army was more mobile, and his soldiers were better prepared, but the Ottomans prevailed in large part due to their efficient modern army and possession of artillery, black powder and muskets. Ismail was wounded and almost captured in battle. Selim entered the Iranian capital of Tabriz in triumph on September 5 but did not linger. A mutiny among his troops, fearing a counterattack and entrapment by fresh Safavid forces called in from the interior, forced the triumphant Ottomans to withdraw prematurely. This allowed Ismail to recover. Among the booty from Tabriz was Ismail's favorite wife, for whose release the Sultan demanded huge concessions, which were refused. Despite his defeat at the Battle of Chaldiran, Ismail quickly recovered most of his kingdom, from east of Lake Van to the Persian Gulf. However, the Ottomans managed to annex for the first time Eastern Anatolia and parts of Mesopotamia, as well as briefly northwestern Iran.

The Venetian ambassador Caterino Zeno describes the events as follows:

The monarch [Selim], seeing the slaughter, began to retreat, and to turn about, and was about to fly, when Sinan, coming to the rescue at the time of need, caused the artillery to be brought up and fired on both the janissaries [sic] and the Persians. The Persian horses hearing the thunder of those infernal machines, scattered and divided themselves over the plain, not obeying their riders bit or spur anymore, from the terror they were in ... It is certainly said, that if it had not been for the artillery, which terrified in the manner related the Persian horses which had never before heard such a din, all his forces would have been routed and put to edge of the sword.

He also adds:

[...] if the Turk had been beaten, the power of Ismail would have become greater than that of Tamerlane, as by the fame alone of such a victory he would have made himself absolute lord of the East.

== Late reign and death ==
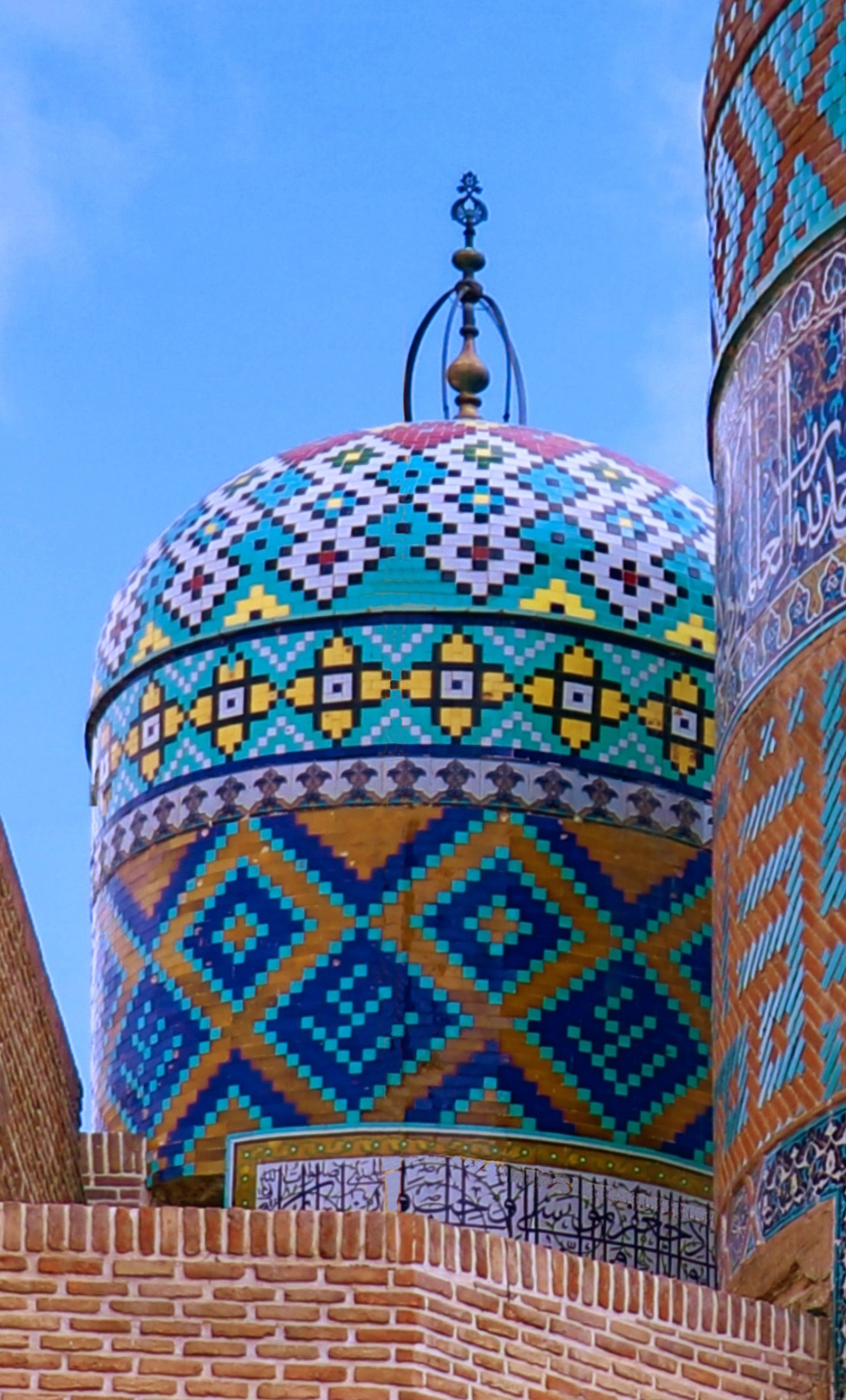
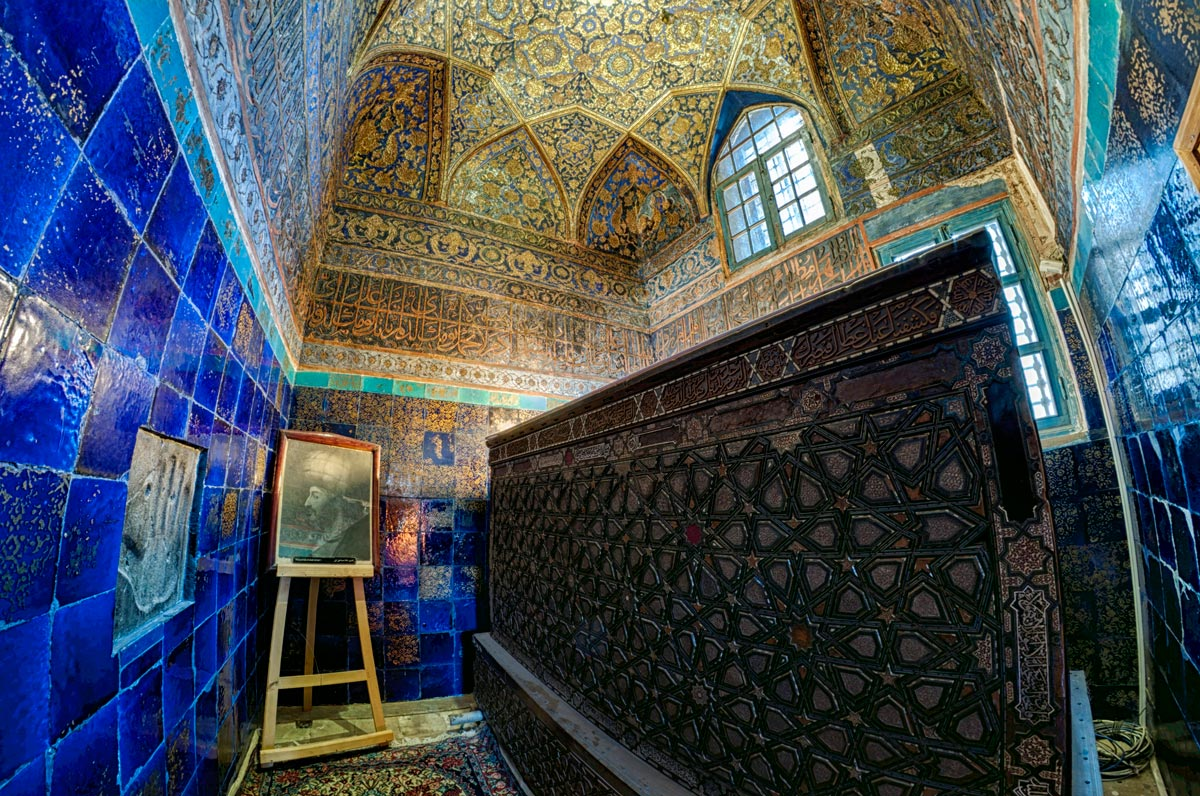
The Tomb of Shah Ismail was built by his wife Tajlu Khanum in 1524, in the Sheikh Safi al-Din Khānegāh and Shrine Ensemble in Ardabil.

After the Battle of Chaldiran, Ismail lost his supernatural air and the aura of invincibility, gradually falling into heavy drinking. He retired to his palace and never again participated in a military campaign, and left the affairs of the state to his vizier Mirza Shah Husayn, who became his close friend and Nadeem (i.e. drinking companion). This allowed Mirza Shah Husayn to gain influence and expand his authority. Mirza Shah Husayn was assassinated in 1523 by a group of Qizilbash officers, after which Ismail appointed Zakariya's son Jalal al-Din Mohammad Tabrizi as his new vizier. Ismail died on 23 May 1524 aged 36 and was buried in Ardabil. He was succeeded by his son Tahmasp I.

The consequences of the defeat at Chaldiran were also psychological for Ismail; his relationships with the Qizilbash followers were fundamentally altered. The tribal rivalries between the Qizilbash which had ceased temporarily before the defeat at Chaldiran resurfaced intensely immediately after his death and led to ten years of civil war (930–40/1524–33) until Shah Tahmasp regained control of the affairs of the state. The Safavids later briefly lost Balkh and Kandahar to the Mughals, and nearly lost Herat to the Uzbeks.

During Ismail's reign, mainly in the late 1510s, the first steps for the Habsburg–Persian alliance were taken with Charles V and Ludwig II of Hungary being in contact with a view of combining against the common Ottoman Turkish enemy.

Shah Ismail's death ensued after a few years of a very saddening and depressing period of his life. He was buried in Ardabil, next to the tomb of his illustrious ancestor Shayk Safi. The Tomb of Shah Ismail was built by his wife Tajlu Khanum in 1524, in the Sheikh Safi al-Din Khānegāh and Shrine Ensemble.

== Policies ==
One of the main problems of Ismail I's reign was the integration of the Safavid order into the administrative structure inherited from previous Muslim polities. Ismail sought to stabilize the newly established Safavid state and restore economic prosperity to the realm, but some of his supporters wanted to continue the revolutionary struggle. The Qizilbash raids in Anatolia, which were one of the causes of the first Ottoman–Safavid war, have been interpreted by Roger Savory as Ismail's attempt to "siphon off this excess revolutionary fervour".

Another major issue was the competition between the Qizilbash, who expected important positions in the Safavid state in return for their services, and the Iranians, who had traditionally dominated the sphere of administration and made up most of the ulama (religious leadership). The amirs (chiefs) of the Qizilbash tribes held the governorships of provinces in early Safavid Iran and occupied the most important state offices.

Ismail instituted the office of vakil-e nafs-e nafis-e homayun; (Note: Literally, 'representative of the exquisite royal person') its holder was to serve as the shah's representative in both religious and secular matters. The Qizilbash amir Husayn Beg Shamlu was the first vakil. The top military offices of amir al-umara (commander-in-chief) and qurchibashi were also granted to Qizilbash leaders. Ismail also made the office of sadr (head of the ulama) an appointee of the shah; this office was held by an Iranian.

Iranians also occupied the office of vizier, the traditional chief of the bureaucracy, but this office was less powerful than that of vakil. (Note: The office of vakil decreased in importance after the Battle of Chaldiran, becoming a purely bureaucratic position and eventually falling into obsolescence.) Eventually, Ismail appointed a succession of Iranians to the office of vakil in an apparent attempt to counterbalance the power of the Qizilbash. This provoked the resistance of the Qizilbash, who assassinated the Iranian vakil Mirza Shah Hossein in 1523 and took control of the state after Ismail's death.

== Royal ideology ==
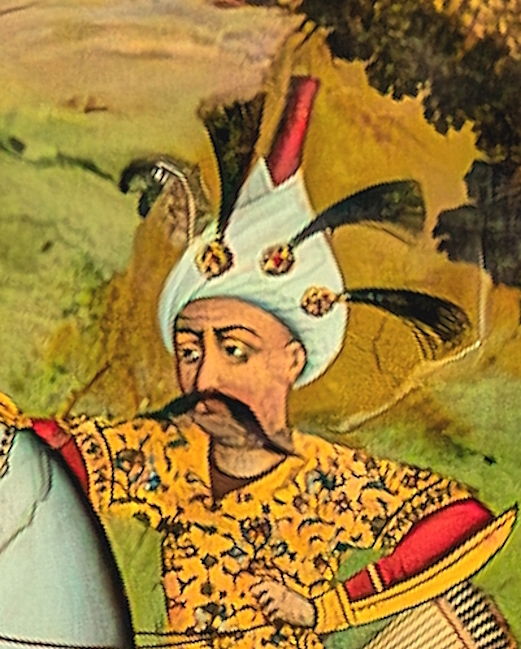
Dynastic portrait of Shah Ismail at the Battle of Merv (1510). Chehel Sotoun, Isfahan. Painted circa 1647

From an early age, Ismail was acquainted with the Iranian cultural legacy. When he reached Lahijan in 1494, he gifted Mirza Ali Karkiya a copy of the medieval Persian epic Shahnameh (Book of Kings) with over 300 illustrations. Owing to his fondness of Iranian national legends, Ismail named three of his four sons after mythological shahs and heroes of the Shahnameh; his oldest son was named Tahmasp, after the last shah of the Pishdadian dynasty; his third son Sam after the champion of the Pishdadian shah Manuchehr and ancestor of the celebrated warrior-hero Rostam; his youngest son Bahram after the Sasanian shah Bahram V (r. 420–438), famous for his romantic life and hunting feats. Ismail's expertise in Persian poetic tales such as the Shahnameh, helped him to represent himself as the heir to the Iranian model of kingship. According to the modern historian Abbas Amanat, Ismail was motivated to visualize himself as a shah of the Shahnameh, possibly Kaykhosrow, the archetype of a great Iranian king, and the person who overcame the Turanian king Afrasiyab, the nemesis of Iran. From an Iranian perspective, Afrasiyab's kingdom of Turan was commonly identified with the land of the Turks, in particular with the Uzbek Khanate of Bukhara in Central Asia. After Ismail defeated the Uzbeks, his victory was portrayed in Safavid records as a victory over the mythological Turanians. However, this fondness of Iranian legends was not only restricted to that of Ismail and Safavid Iran; Both Muhammad Shaybani, Selim I, and later Babur and his Mughal progeny, all associated themselves with these legends. Regardless of its increasing differences, Western, Central, and South Asia all followed a common Persianate model of culture and kingship.

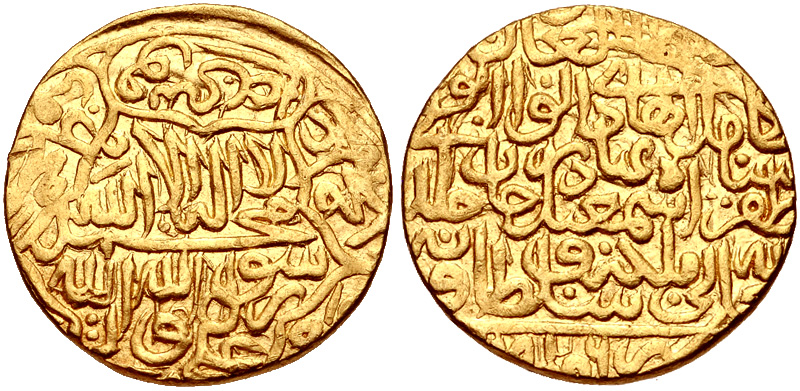
Ashrafi of Shah Ismail, struck in Tabriz. Dated AH 926 (AD 1519/20)

In the second part of the fifteenth century, Safavid propaganda adopted many beliefs held of ghulat groups. Ismail's father and grandfather were reportedly considered divine by their disciples, and Ismail taught his followers that he was a divine incarnation, as is demonstrated by his poetry. For example, in some of his poems he wrote "I am the absolute Truth" and "I am God's eye (or God himself)". This made his followers intensely loyal to him. Through their supposed descent from Imam Musa al-Kazim, Ismail and his successors claimed the role of deputy (na'ib) of the Hidden Imam (the Mahdi) and also the infallibility or sinlessness (isma) ascribed to the Mahdi; this brought them into conflict with the mujtahids (high-ranking Shi'ite jurisprudents) who traditionally claimed the authority of deputyship. At least until his defeat at Chaldiran in 1514, Ismail identified himself as the reincarnation of Alid figures such as Ali, Husayn, and the Mahdi. Historian Cornell Fleischer argues that Ismail took part in a broader trend of messianic and millenarian claims, which were also being expressed in the Ottoman Empire. He writes, "Shah Ismāʿīl was the most spectacular and successful— but by no means singular—instance of the convergence between mysticism, messianism, and politics at the beginning of the sixteenth century."

Besides his self-identification with Muslim figures, Ismail also presented himself as the personification of the divine light of investiture (farr) that had radiated in the ancient Iranian shahs Darius, Khosrow I Anushirvan (r. 531–579), Shapur I (r. 240–270), since the era of the Achaemenids and Sasanians. This was a typical Safavid combination of Islamic and pre-Islamic Iranian motifs. The Safavids also included and promoted Turkic and Mongol aspects from the Central Asian steppe, such as giving high-ranking positions to Turkic leaders, and utilizing Turkic tribal clans for their aspirations in war. They likewise included Turco-Mongolian titles such as khan and bahadur to their growing collection of titles. The cultural aspects of the Safavids soon became even more numerous, as Ismail and his successors included and promoted Kurds, Arabs, Georgians, Circassians, and Armenians into their imperial program. Moreover, the conquests of Genghis Khan and Timur had merged Mongolian and Chagatai aspects into the Persian bureaucratic culture, terminology, seals, and symbols.

== Art of the book ==
Shah Ismail, by conquering both the Aq Qoyunlu and the Timurids, took over the two dominant Persian artistic schools of the time in the domain of calligraphy and miniatures: the western Turkoman school based in Tabriz, characterized by vibrant and colorful compositions, which had developed under his uncle Sultan Yaqub Aq Qoyunlu, and the eastern Timurid school based in Herat and brought to new summits by Sultan Husayn Bayqara, which was more balanced and restrained and used subtle colors. Artists from both realms were made to work together, such as Behzad from Herat and Sultan Mohammed from Tabriz, to collaborate on major manuscripts such as the Shahnameh of Shah Tahmasp. This synthesis created the new Safavid imperial style. This new aesthetic also affected traditional crafts, including textiles, carpets, and metalwork, and influenced the styles of Ottoman Turkey and Mughal India.

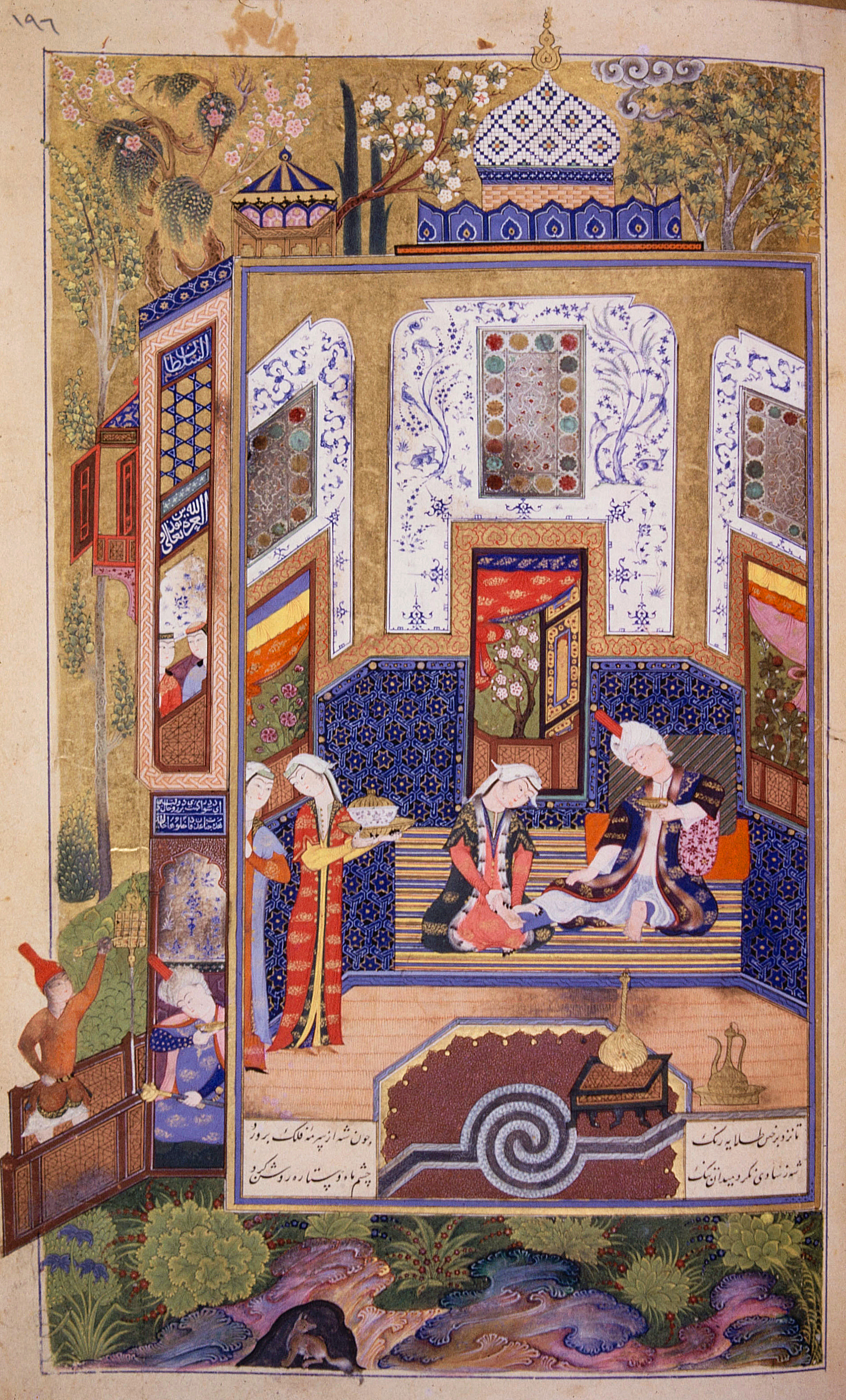
Bahram Gur in the White Pavilion. Khamsa of Nizami, Tabriz (1505)

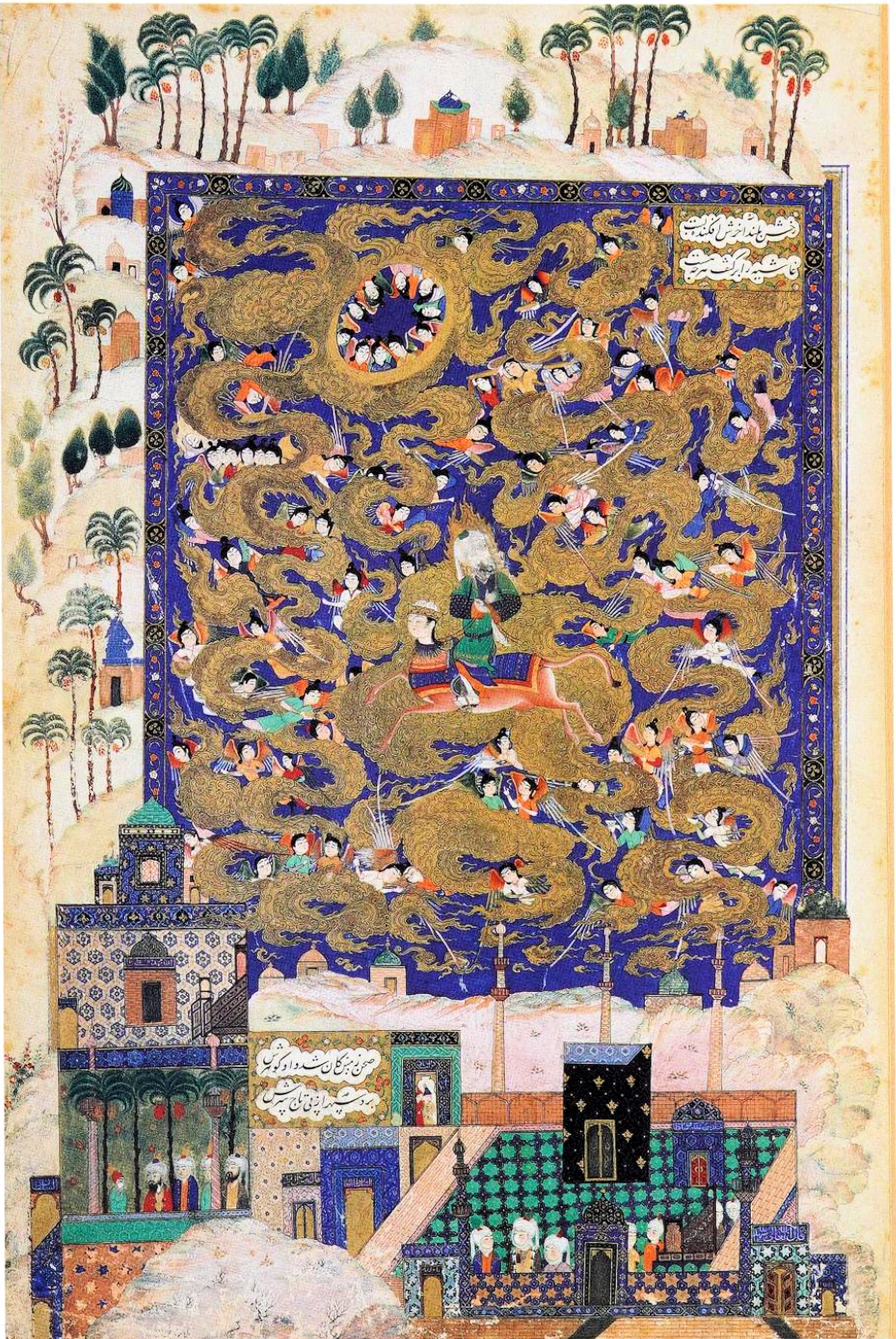
The Mir'aj of Prophet Muhammad. Khamsa of Nizami, Tabriz (1505)

Miniatures commissioned by Shah Ismail and painted by Sultan Mohammed in Tabriz, circa 1505. Protagonists wear his signature headdress, the Taj-i Haydari

Soon after he conquered the Aq Qoyunlu capital of Tabriz in 1501-1502, Shah Ismail started to commission illustrated manuscripts such as the Dastan-i Jamal u Jalal, Tabriz (1502-1505). Such early works followed the Turkman style of miniatures, with highly decorative elements, and exuberant representations of nature.

Another early commission was the contribution of additional miniatures in 1505 to an Aq Qoyunlu manuscript, the Khamsa of Nizami (Tabriz, 1481). Shah Isma'il entrusted the creation of eleven miniatures to the young painter Sultan Mohammed, who later became a key artist of the Safavid school. Some of the paintings created by Sultan Mohammed for this manuscript are considered as highly original, such as The Mir'aj of Prophet Muhammad (now in the Keir Collection in London), in which the Prophet can be seen rising over the Great Mosque in Mecca, the Ka'ba and his tomb, riding into a billowing mass of heavenly clouds with a multitude of angels. The sky is pieced with an oculus, an artistic device of probable European origin. A small inscription in gold letters on the portal of a small building on a terrace gives the date of creation as 1505.

One of the main criteria used to differentiate the Safavid miniatures from the Aq Qoyunlu ones is for a great part iconographic, as the protagonists in Shah Isma'il's paintings generally wear his signature turban, the Taj-i Haydari, which he introduced when he occupied Tabriz in 1501-1502.

Towards the end of his reign, circa 1520-21, Shāh Ismaʿīl also commissioned panegyric histories of his accomplishments, where he can be seen in various court and battle scenes. These works, such as the Shāhnāmah Shāh Ismaʿīl (Tabriz, 1541), were generally completed only after he died. These manuscripts offer some very interesting illustrations in lively style, which, stylistically, are witnesses to the persistence of the Turkoman element in the creations of Tabriz around 1541. Some, such as Shāhnāmah Shāh Ismaʿīl (Bodleian Library, MS. Elliot 328) are more provincial in style but also show undisguised and rather gruesome scenes of conquest, such as the time when a defender of Firuzkuh was roasted on a spit at the hands of the Safavids.

Probably about 1522, Shah Isma'il started a sumptuous illuminated manuscript of the Shahnameh for his son Shah Tahmasp I. But Shah Ismail I died in 1524, shortly after the work had begun. Work continued into the 1530s, ultimately including 258 original miniatures. It is now dispersed, and known under the name of Shahnameh of Shah Tahmasp.

=== Ismail's poetry ===
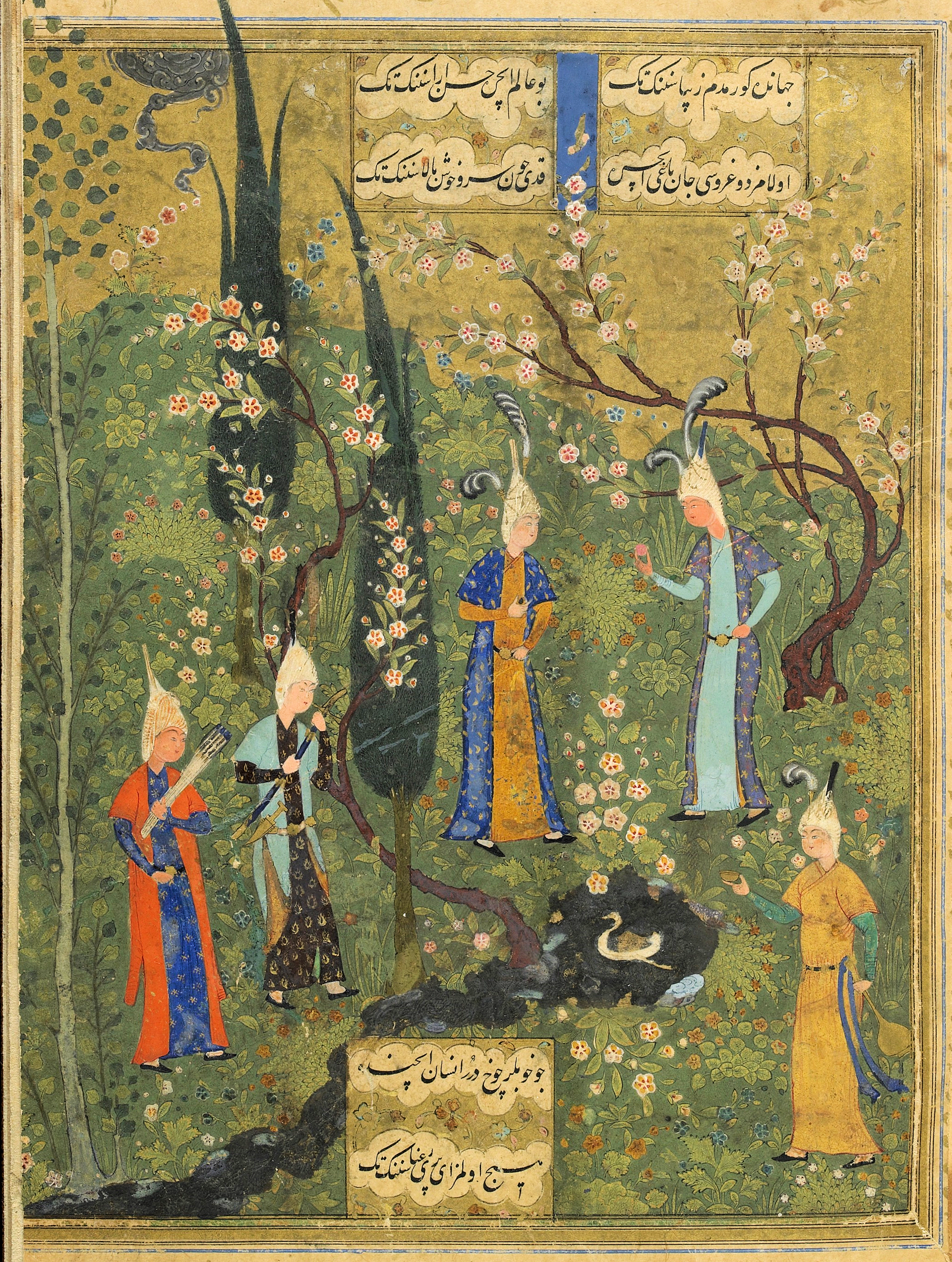
Dīvān of Khatā'ī (Collected Poems by Shah Isma’il), "Five youths in the garden". Tabriz. 1515-20s. Text in Turkish in black nasta’liq script: "I have never seen anyone so beautiful as you on the earth, never in this world anyone as gorgeous as you. Truly within the garden of the soul there can be no gesture so elegant as your tall erect cypress. Although there are many beauties among humanity, there is none, O Beauty, so radiant as you".

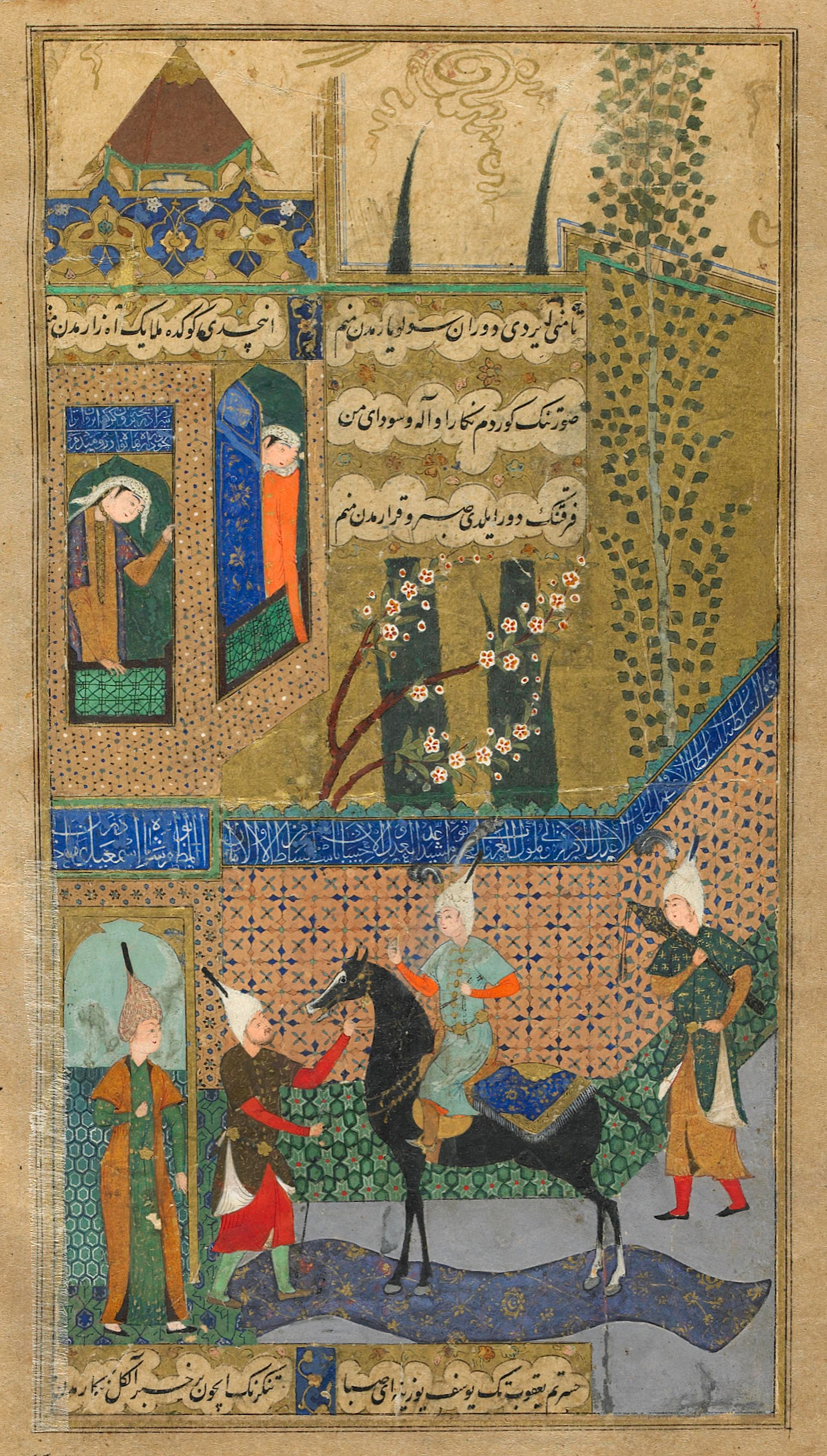
Dīvān of Khatā'ī (Collected Poems by Shah Isma’il), "The Castle". Tabriz. 1515-20s. Text on the castle walls: "Founder of the Sultanate, the greatest sultan and most just, most noble emperor, liege lord of the kings of the Arabs and Persians, layer of the foundations of justice and munificence, spreader of the carpet of safety and security, Abu'l-Muzaffar Shah Isma'il Bahadur Khan".

Ismail is also known for his poetry using the pen name Khaṭāʾī (Arabic: خطائي, lit. 'the wrongful', 'sinner', or 'the mistaken one'). Khatai was a popular pen name among Iranian poets, but none are as famous as Ismail. He wrote in Turkish and Persian, although his extant verses in the former vastly outnumber those in the latter. The Turkish spoken in Iran, which was commonly known as Turki, was not the Turkish of Istanbul, but a precursor of modern-day Azerbaijani or Azeri Turkic (see also: Ajem-Turkic). His devotional poetry was meant for the mainly Turkish-speaking Qizilbash who followed him, hence his decision to write in that language. Ismail used some words and forms not found in modern Turkish speech. Chaghatai words are also found in his poetry. (Note: Within this context, James J. Reid suggests that Chaghatai became the lingua franca amongst the multilingual and polyglot Qizilbash in Iran.) Vladimir Minorsky writes that Ismail's Turkish "already shows traces of decomposition due to the influence of the Iranian milieu".

Khata'i's divan (collection of poems) was compiled during the reign of Ismail's successor, Tahmasp I, so all of the poems in it may not actually belong to Ismail's pen. The oldest surviving copy of the divan (dated 1535) comprises 262 qasidas and ghazals, and ten ruba'is. The second oldest copy has 254 qasidas and ghazals, three mathnawis, one murabba' and one musaddas. T. Gandjei argues that the syllabic poems attributed to Khata'i (as opposed to the usual aruz ones, based on syllable length) are really the works of Bektashi-Alevi poets in Anatolia. Kioumars Ghereghlou states that the author of the divan is "still unknown", citing the fact that Ismail's son Sam Mirza never referred to his father as the author of the divan in his Tuhfa-yi Sami, a collection of biographies of contemporary Persian poets (he does, however, state that his father wrote poetry in Persian and Turkish).

Ismail is considered an important figure in the literary history of Azerbaijani language. According to Roger Savory and Ahmet Karamustafa, "Ismail was a skillful poet who used prevalent themes and images in lyric and didactic-religious poetry with ease and some degree of originality". He was also deeply influenced by the Persian literary tradition of Iran, particularly by the Shahnameh of Ferdowsi, which probably explains the fact that he named all of his sons after characters from the Shahnameh. Dickson and Welch suggest that Ismail's "Shahnamaye Shahi" was intended as a present to his young son Tahmasp. After defeating Muhammad Shaybani's Uzbeks, Ismail asked Hatefi, a famous poet from Jam (Khorasan), to write a Shahnameh-like epic about his victories and his newly established dynasty. Although the epic was left unfinished, it was an example of mathnawis in the heroic style of the Shahnameh written later on for the Safavid kings.

Most of the poems are concerned with love—particularly the mystical Sufi kind—though there are also poems propagating Shi'i doctrine and Safavi politics. His other serious works include the Nasihatnāme, a book of advice sometimes included in his divan, and the unfinished Dahnāme, a book which extols the virtues of love—both written in proto-Azeri Turkic.

Along with the poet Imadaddin Nasimi, Khata'i is considered to be among the first proponents of using a simpler Azerbaijani language in verse that would appeal to a broader audience. His work is most popular in Azerbaijan, as well as among the Bektashis of Turkey. There is a large body of Alevi and Bektashi poetry that has been attributed to him. The major impact of his religious writings, in the long run, was the conversion of Persia from Sunni to Shia Islam.

Examples of his poems are:

=== Poetry example 1 ===
Today I have come to the world as a Master. Know truly that I am Haydar's son.
I am Fereydun, Khosrow, Jamshid, and Zahak. I am Zal's son (Rostam) and Alexander.
The mystery of I am the truth is hidden in this my heart. I am the Absolute Truth and what I say is Truth.
I belong to the religion of the "Adherent of the Ali" and on the Shah's path I am a guide to every one who says: "I am a Muslim." My sign is the "Crown of Happiness".
I am the signet-ring on Sulayman's finger. Muhammad is made of light, Ali of Mystery.
I am a pearl in the sea of Absolute Reality.
I am Khatai, the Shah's slave full of shortcomings.
At thy gate I am the smallest and the last [servant].

=== Poetry example 2 ===
My name is Shāh Ismā'īl. I am God's mystery. I am the leader of all these ghāzīs.
My mother is Fātima, my father is 'Ali; and eke I am the Pīr of the Twelve Imāms.
I have recovered my father's blood from Yazīd. Be sure that I am of Haydarian essence.
I am the living Khidr and Jesus, son of Mary. I am the Alexander of (my) contemporaries.
Look you, Yazīd, polytheist and the adept of the Accursed one, I am free from the Ka'ba of hypocrites.
In me is Prophethood (and) the mystery of Holiness. I follow the path of Muhammad Mustafā.
I have conquered the world at the point of (my) sword. I am the Qanbar of Murtaza 'Ali.
My sire is Safī, my father Haydar. Truly I am the Ja'far of the audacious.
I am a Husaynid and have curses for Yazīd. I am Khatā'ī, a servant of the Shāh's.

== Architecture ==
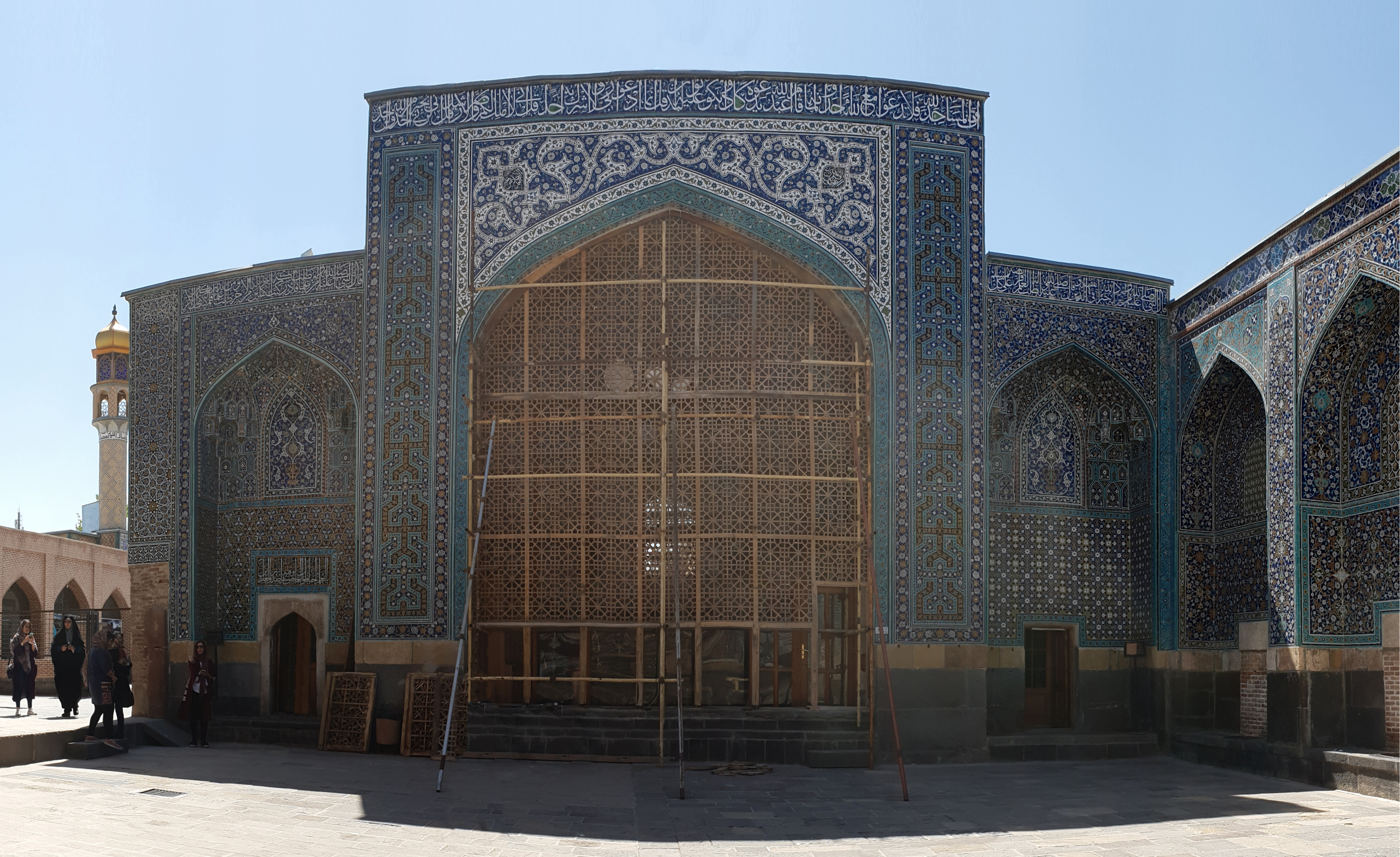
Dar al-Hadith ("Hall for the study of the Hadiths") in the Sheikh Safi al-Din Khānegāh and Shrine Ensemble in Ardabil

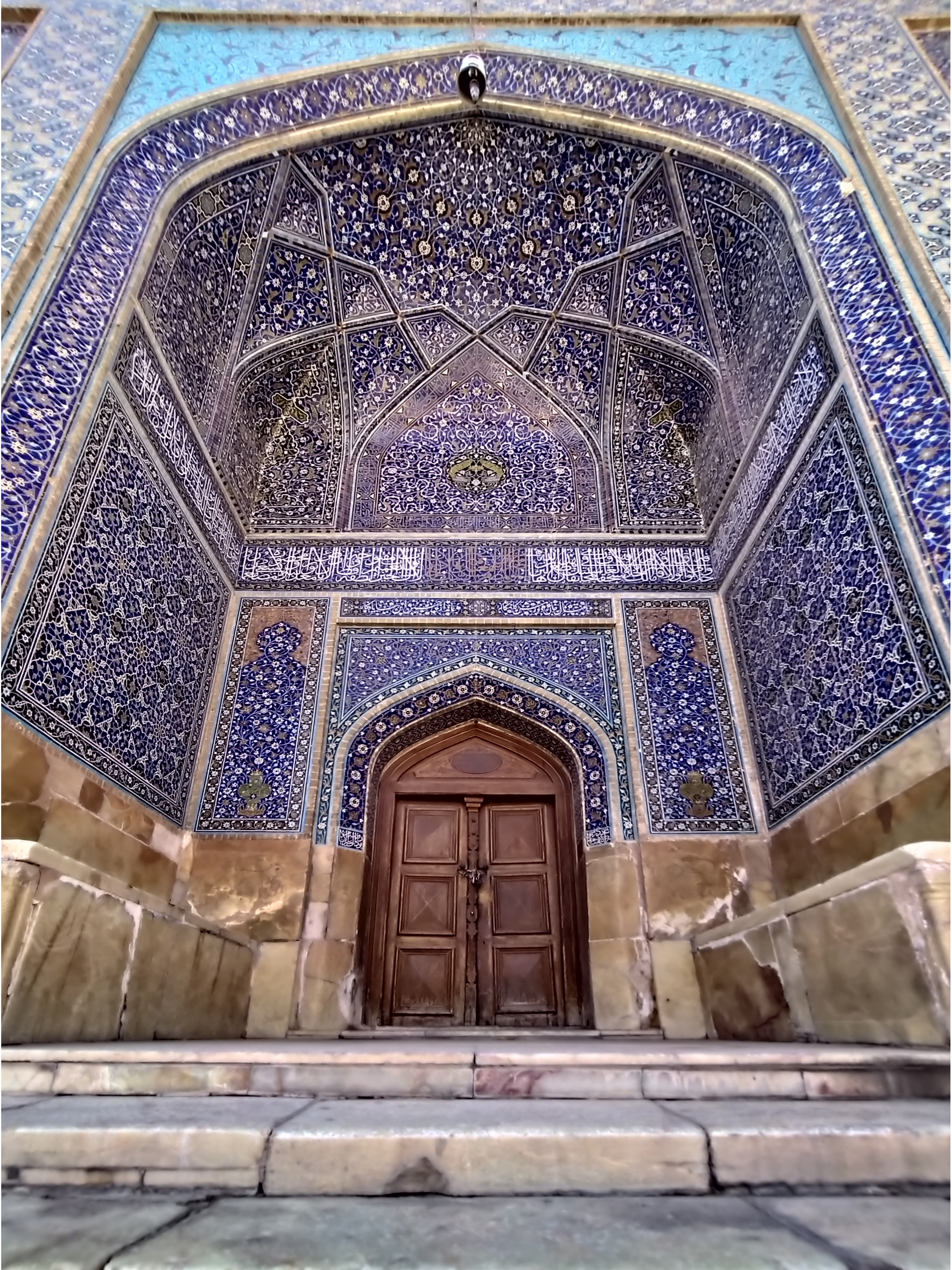
Mausoleum of Harun-e Vilayat in Isfahan (1512–1513).

Architectural construction was almost nonexistent during the time of Shah Ismail and his son Shah Tahmasp, especially compared to the previous Timurid era, or the following century under Abbas the Great, probably because of the general instability of the realm which discouraged large and long-term monumental investments. Many buildings also remained from previous eras, which limited the need for further constructions. Thus, at Tabriz, the new capital, all the surviving Ilkhanid, Jalayirid, Aq Qoyunlu and Timurid monuments largely satisfied the needs of the Shah and his administration.

It was nevertheless Ismail who made the city of Ardabil (northern Iran) into a dynastic center and place of pilgrimage, embellishing the Ardabil complex surrounding the tomb of Shaykh Safi and burying there the remains of his father in 1509. Shah Ismail was probably responsible for the construction of the Dar al-Hadith in Ardabil, a hall dedicated to the study of the Hadiths, similar to the old Dar al-Huffaz, which served for reciting the Quran. More marginally, Ismail is also credited with the restoration of the Jameh Mosque of Saveh, in 1520, of which the exterior decoration has disappeared, but of which the mihrab combines the use of ancient stucco and a delicate decoration of arabesques in ceramic mosaic. Another mosque of Saveh, the Masjed-e meydan, also received a similar mihrab, dated by inscriptions to between 1510 and 1518.

Durmish Khan Shamlu, a Turkoman potentate and brother-in-law of Ismail, partially compensated for this lack of construction beginning in 1503. This governor of Isfahan, who lived more often at the court of Tabriz than in his city, left the reins to Mirza Shah Hussein Isfahani, the greatest architect of the period, whom he commissioned and funded to build in Isfahan the Mausoleum of Harun-e Vilayat (1512–1513), and the Ali Mosque (1522), the only mosque built in Iran in the first half of the 16th century. The Mausoleum of Harun-e Vilayat is composed of a square chamber under a cupola, a completely traditional design. The cupola rests on a high drum, the muqarnas filling the octagonal passageway. Two minarets, now gone, magnified the great porch, while the decor of hazerbaf and the ceramic mosaic, concentrated on the facade, stayed in the Timurid tradition. The facade, punctuated by blind arches, is thus unified by basic decor, as was already the case at the mosque of Yazd. Still, the decorative elements of the Mausoleum of Harun-e Vilayat and their extreme density are already indicative of the ulterior development of Safavid architecture.

== Appearance and skills ==
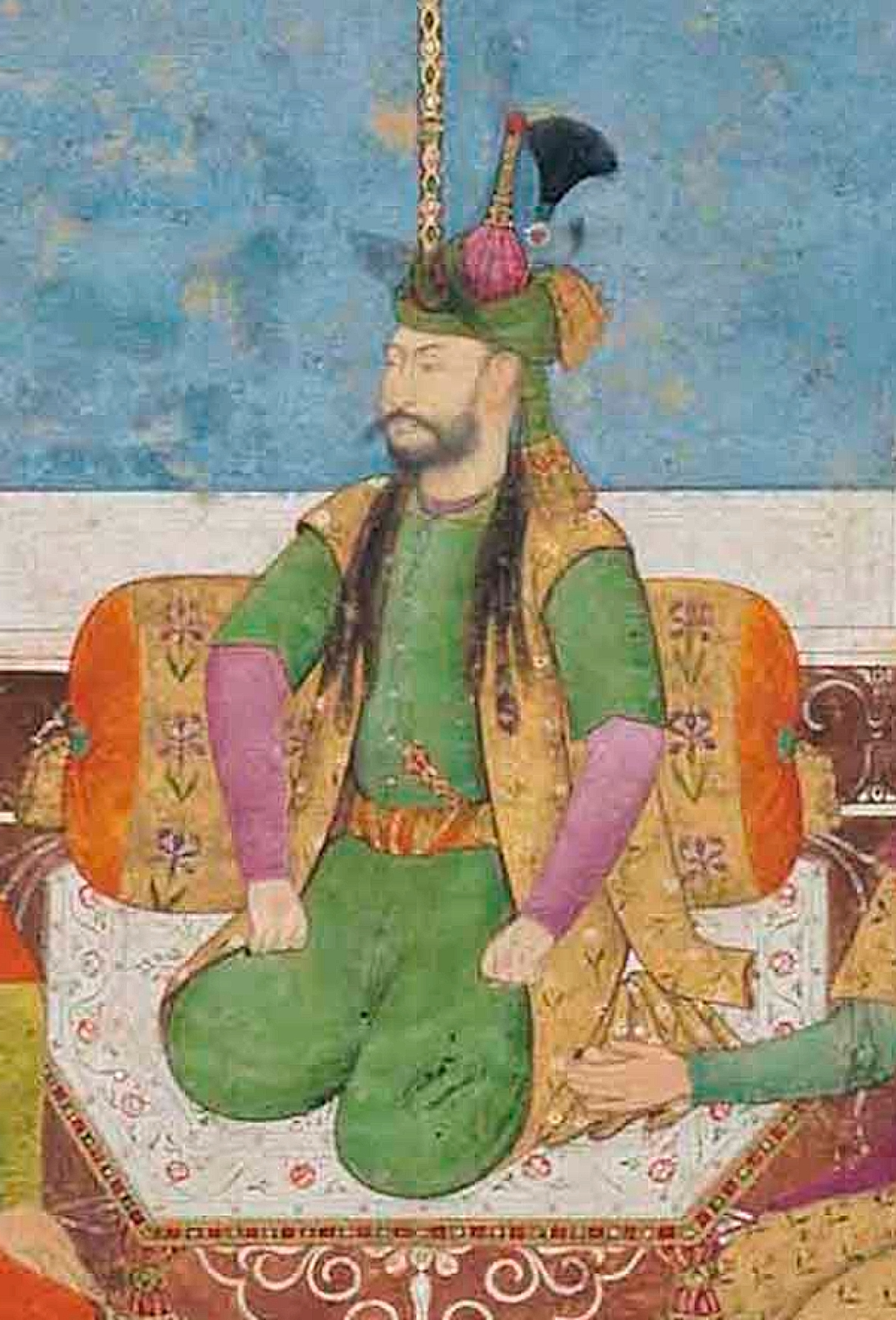
Portrait of Shah Ismail, from Mughal India, circa 1650-60

Ismail was described by contemporaries as having a regal appearance, gentlemanly in quality and youthfulness. He also had a fair complexion and red hair.

An Italian traveller, Giovanni Maria Angiolello, described Ismail as follows:

This Sophi is fair, handsome, and very pleasing; not very tall, but of a light and well-framed figure; rather stout than slight, with broad shoulders. His hair is reddish; he only wears moustachios, and uses his left hand instead of his right. He is as brave as a game cock, and stronger than any of his lords; in the archery contests, out of the ten apples that are knocked down, he knocks down seven.

=== Mughal portraiture ===
A few Mughal depictions of Shah Ismail are also known, such as "Shah Ismail Safavi and Six of His Descendants", now in the Museum of Islamic Art, Doha, Qatar (MIA.2013.109). Shah Ismail Safavi appears seating under a symbolic canopy, together with several of his illustrious descendants from the line of his youger son Bahram Mirza Safavi, who formed a cadet branch of the Safavid dynasty in the service of the Mughal Empire that survived there for two centuries and became one of the most prominent families in the Mughal court. One of its most prominent members was Rustam Mirza Safavi (1565–1642), who also appears in the line-up. This painting was in the possession of the rival dynasty of the Mughal. This may reflect an intent to document the Safavid dynasty, or even to exert some kind of symbolic influence over it.

=== European perception ===
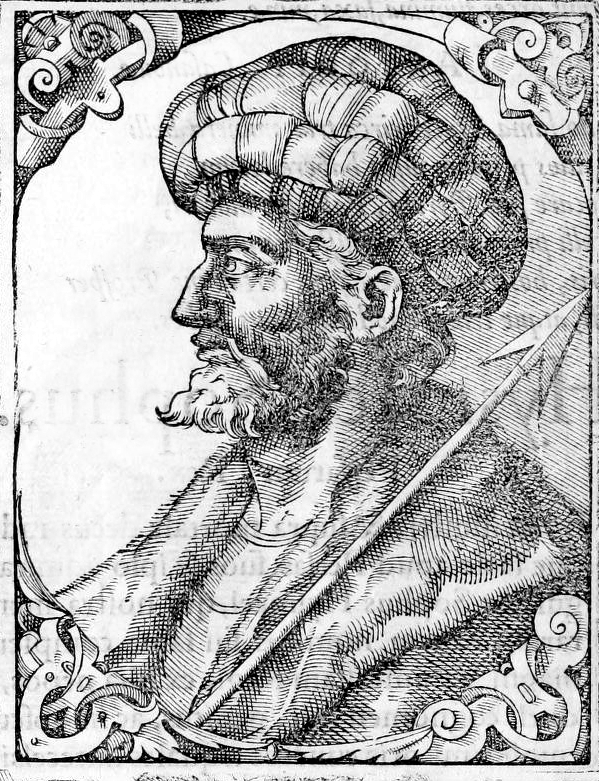
Imaginary portrait of Shah Ismail ("Hysmael Sophus"), by Paolo Giovio in his Elogia virorum bellica virtute illustrium (1554).

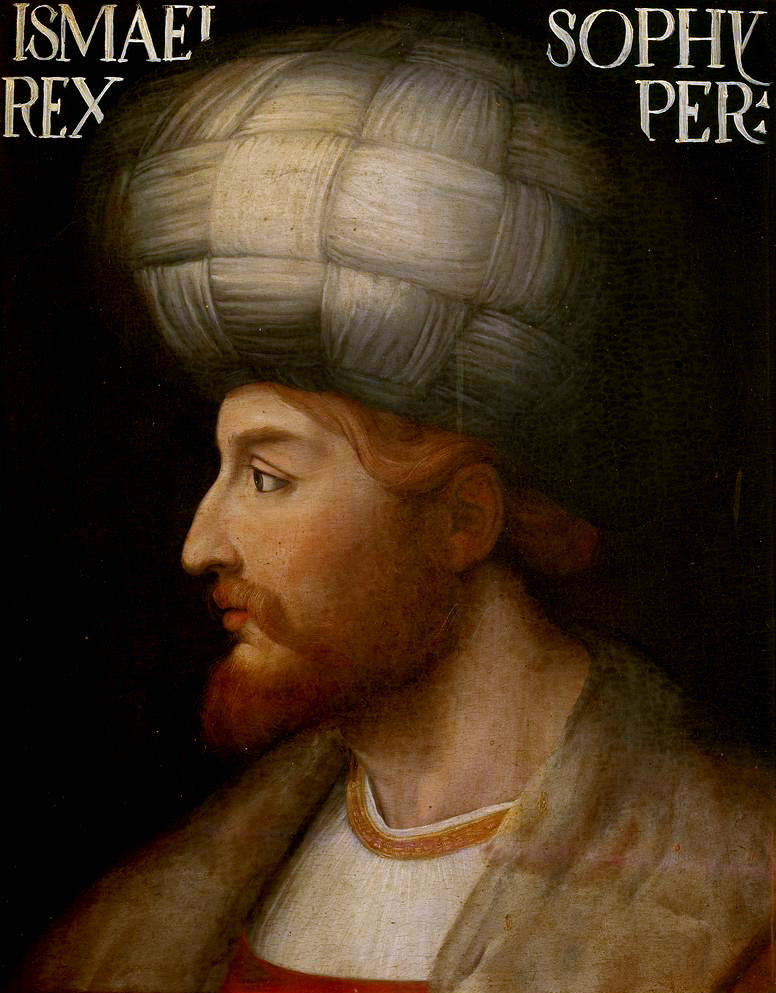
Idealized European portrait of Shah Ismail I, inscribed "Ismael Sophy Rex Pers". Italian painter Cristofano dell'Altissimo, 1552–68, after the engraving by Paolo Giovio.

Europeans made several attempts at a portraiture of Sultan Ismail. Paolo Giovio, in his Elogia virorum bellica virtute illustrium (1554), created a gallery of portraits for all the great men of his time, some possibly based on notes from travelers, including a portrait of Sultan Ismail, whom he named "Hysmael Sophus" ("Ismail the Sage").

This portrait engraving was then used as a reference by the Italian painter Cristofano dell'Altissimo between 1552 and 1568 for his famous portrait of Shah Ismail in the Florencian style. It is thought that this portrait was affected by idealized notions of Shah Ismail as a savior of Christians and Europeans against the Ottomans, complete with rumors of a conversion of Christianity. It may be for this reason that Shah Ismail's face is idealized in this portrait as "spiritual, nice and bright".

== Legacy ==
Ismail's greatest legacy was establishing an empire which lasted over 200 years. As Brad Brown states, "The Safavid dynasty would rule for two more centuries [after Ismail's death] and establish the basis for the modern nation-state of Iran." Even after the fall of the Safavids in 1736, their cultural and political influence endured through the succeeding dynasties of the Afsharid, Zand, Qajar, and Pahlavi states and into the contemporary Islamic Republic of Iran as well as the neighbouring Republic of Azerbaijan, where Shia Islam is still the dominant religion as it was during the Safavid era.

== In popular culture ==
=== Literature ===
In the Safavid period, the famous Azeri folk romance Shah Ismail emerged. According to Azerbaijani literary critic Hamid Arasly, this story is related to Ismail I. But it is also possible that it is dedicated to Ismail II.

=== Places and structures ===
- A district (Xətai raion), facility, monument (erected in 1993), and metro station in Baku, Azerbaijan
- A street in Ganja, Azerbaijan

=== Statues ===
- A statue in Ardabil, Iran (in the Azerbaijan region of Iran)
- A statue in Baku, Azerbaijan
- A sculpture in Khachmaz, Azerbaijan
- A bust in Ganja, Azerbaijan

=== Music ===
Shah Ismayil is the name of an Azerbaijani mugham opera in 6 acts and 7 scenes composed by Muslim Magomayev, in 1915–19.

=== Other ===
Shah Ismail Order (the highest Azerbaijani military award presented by the Commander-in-chief and President of Azerbaijan)

== Issue ==
=== Sons ===
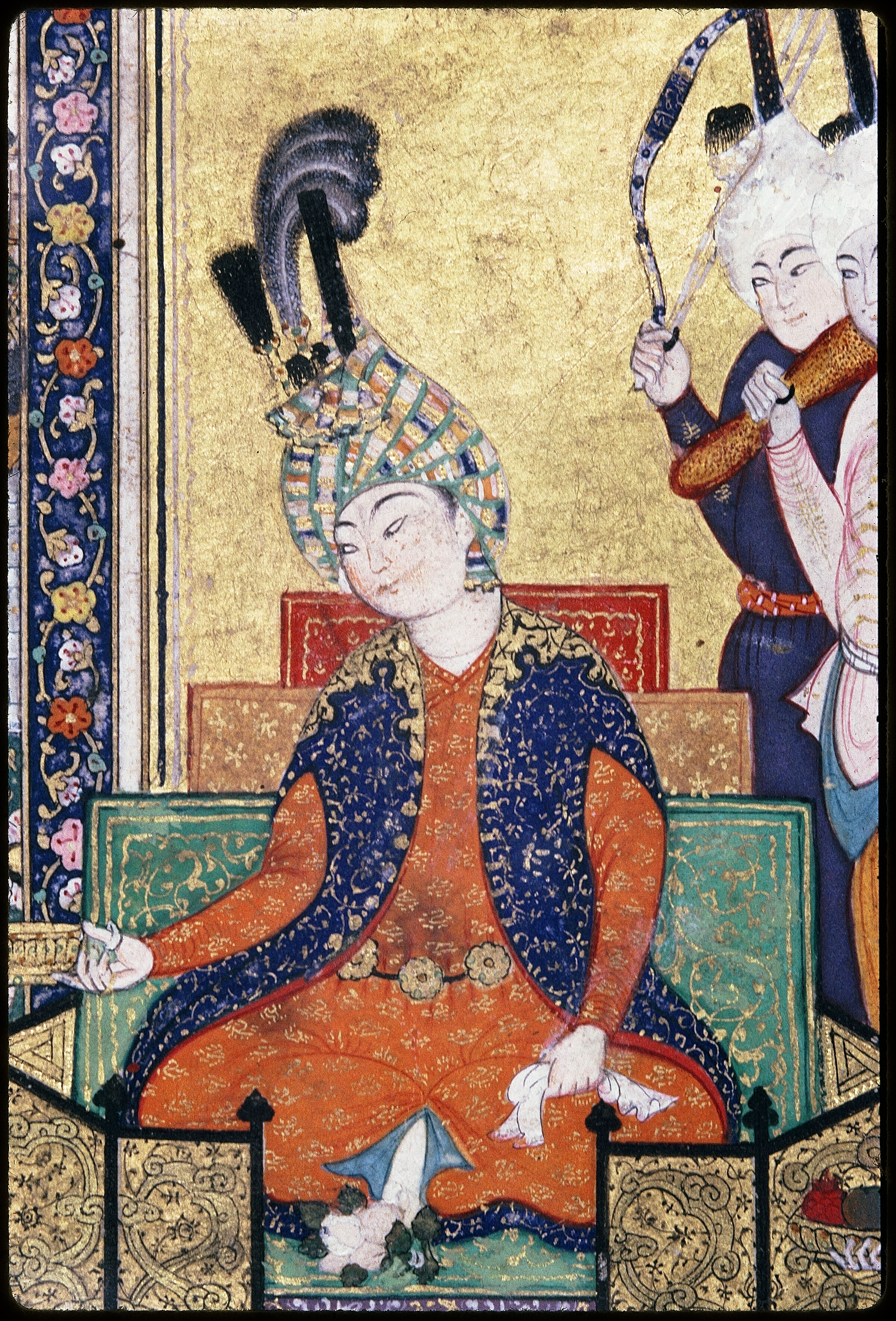
Contemporary portrait of Shah Tahmasp, son of Shah Ismail. Cartier Hafiz, painted circa 1531.

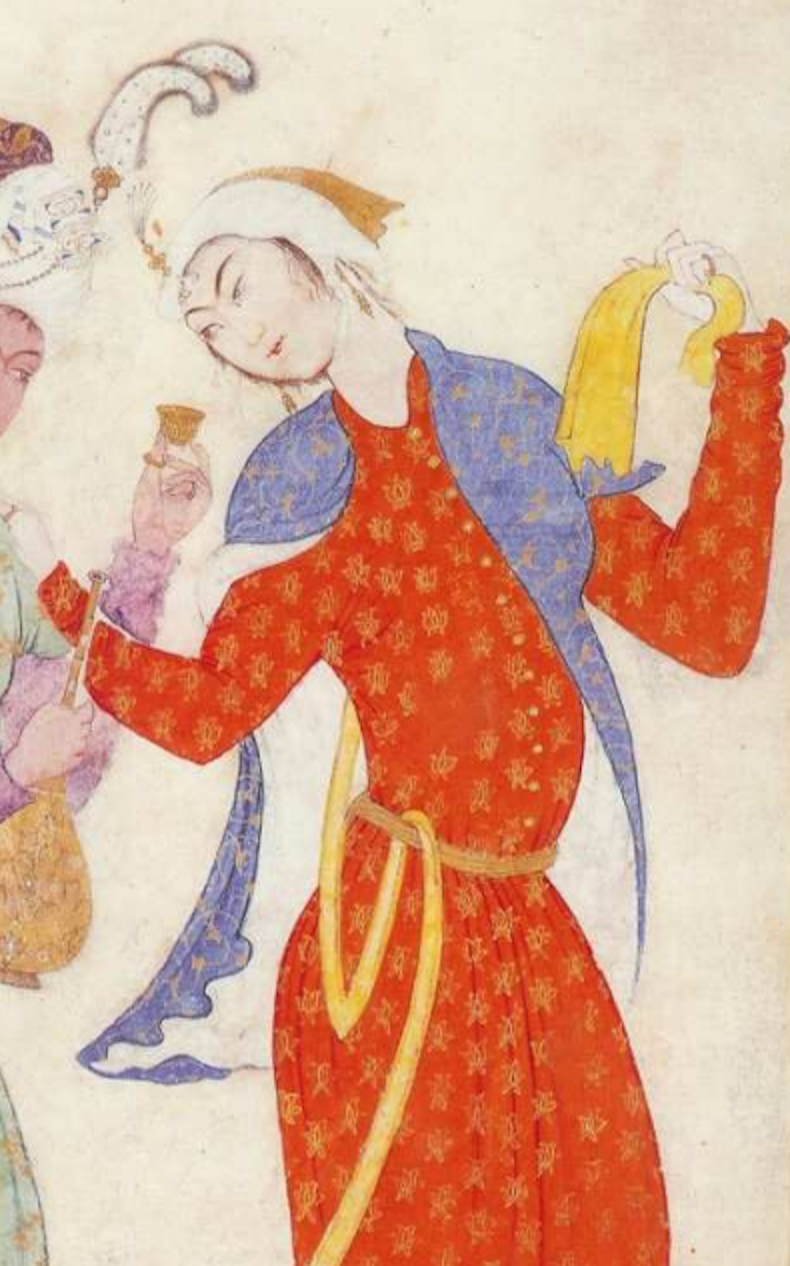
Likely depiction of Mahinbanu Soltanum, daughter of Shah Ismail. Qazvin, circa 1544.

- Tahmasp I – with Tajlu Khanum.
- Alqas Mirza (15 March 1515 – 9 April 1550) Governor of Astrabad 1532/33–1538, Shirvan 1538–1547 and Derbent 1546–1547. He rebelled against his brother Tahmasp with Ottoman help. Captured and imprisoned at the Fortress of Qahqahan. He had a consort, Khadija Sultan Khanum, and two sons,
  - Ahmad Mirza (died 1568)
  - Farukh Mirza (died 1568)
- Rostam Mirza (born 13 September 1517)
- Sam Mirza (28 August 1518 – December 1567) Governor-General of Khorasan 1521–1529 and 1532–1534, and of Ardabil 1549–1571. He rebelled against his brother Tahmasp, was captured and imprisoned at the Fortress of Qahqahan. He had two sons and one daughter. His daughter married Prince Jesse of Kakheti (died 1583) Governor of Shaki, the second son of Georgian king Levan of Kakheti.
- Bahram Mirza (7 September 1518 – 16 September 1550) – with Tajlu Khanum. Governor of Khorasan 1529–1532, Gilan 1536–1537 and Hamadan 1546–1549. He married Zainab Sultan Khanum and had three sons:
  - Soltan Hosayn Mirza (died 1577)
  - Ibrahim Mirza (1541–1577),
  - Badi uz-Zaman Mirza (k.1577)
- Hossein Mirza (born 11 December 1520)

=== Daughters ===
- Pari Khan Khanum – with Tajlu Khanum, married in 1520–21 to Shirvanshah Khalilullah II;
- Mahinbanu Khanum – with Tajlu Khanum (1519 – 20 January 1562, buried in Qom), unmarried;
- Khanesh Khanum (1507–563, buried in Imam Husayn Shrine, Karbala), married to Shah Nur-al Din Nimatullah Baqi, and had a son named Mirmiran and a daughter named Pari peykar Begum (Wife of Ismail II);
- Khair al-Nisa Khanum (died at Masuleh, 13 March 1532, and buried in Sheikh Safi al-Din tomb, Ardabil), married on 5 September 1517 to Amira Dubbaj, ruler of Gilan and Fuman;
- Shah Zainab Khanum;
- Nakira Khanum;
- Farangis Khanum;

== Ancestry ==
Ancestors of Ismail I

16. Khvajeh Ali Safavi
8. Sheikh Ibrahim Safavi
4. Sheikh Junāyd Safavi
2. Sheikh Heydar Safavi
20. Qara Yuluk Osman, Ruler of the Aq Qoyunlu (= 24)
10. Ali Beyg, Ruler of the Aq Qoyunlu (= 12)
21. Daughter of Alexios III of Trebizond (= 25)
5. Khadijeh Khatun
22. Pir Ali Bayandur (= 26)
11. Sara Khatun (= 13)
1. Ismail I
24. Qara Yuluk Osman, Ruler of the Aq Qoyunlu (= 20)
12. Ali Beyg, Ruler of the Aq Qoyunlu (= 10)
25. Daughter of Alexios III of Trebizond (= 21)
6. Uzun Hassan, Ruler of the Aq Qoyunlu
26. Pir Ali Bayandur (= 22)
13. Sara Khatun (= 11)
3. Alemshah Halime Begum
28. Alexios IV of Trebizond
14. John IV of Trebizond
29. Theodora Kantakouzene
7. Theodora of Trebizond
30. Alexander I of Georgia
15. Bagrationi
31. Dulandukht Orbeliani

== See also ==
- Campaigns of Ismail I
- Iranian Azerbaijanis
- Safavid dynasty family tree
- List of Turkic-languages poets
- Safavid conversion of Iran from Sunnism to Shiism
- Seven Great Poets

== Bibliography ==
- Abasova, E. G. (1976). "Magomaev A. M." Магомаев А. М.. In Keldysh, Yu. V. (ed.). Muzykalʹnaia ėntsiklopediia Музыкальная энциклопедия. Vol. 3. Moscow: Sovetskaia ėntsiklopediia.
- Amanat, Abbas (2017). Iran: A Modern History. Yale University Press. ISBN 978-0300112542.
- Axworthy, Michael (2008). A History of Iran: Empire of the Mind. New York: Basic Books. pp. 1–368. ISBN 978-0-465-00888-9.
- Babaie, Sussan (2003). "Building on the Past: the Shaping of Safavid Architecture, 1501-76". Hunt for paradise: court arts of Safavid Iran 1501-1576. New York Milano: Asia Society Museum; Skira. ISBN 978-8884915900.
- Berengian, Sakina (1988). Azeri and Persian Literary Works in Twentieth Century Iranian Azerbaijan. Berlin: Klaus Schwarz Verlag. ISBN 978-3922968696.
- Bingham, Woodbridge; Conroy, Hilary; Iklé, Frank William (1974). A History of Asia, Volume 1: Formation of Civilizations, from Antiquity to 1600. Allyn and Bacon.
- Blair, Sheila S.; Bloom, Jonathan M. (25 September 1996). The Art and Architecture of Islam 1250-1800. Yale University Press. p. 68. ISBN 978-0-300-06465-0.
- Blair, Sheila (2014). Text and image in medieval Persian art. Edinburgh: Edinburgh University Press. ISBN 978-0748655786.
- Blake, Stephen P (2013). Time in Early Modern Islam: Calendar, Ceremony, and Chronology in the Safavid, Mughal and Ottoman Empires. Cambridge University Press. p. 27. ISBN 978-1-107-03023-7.
- Blow, David (2009). Shah Abbas: The Ruthless King Who Became an Iranian Legend. I.B. Tauris.
- Bogle, Emory C. (1998). Islam: Origin and Belief. Austin: University of Texas Press. ISBN 9780292708617.
- Bomati, Yves; Nahavandi, Houchang (2017). Shah Abbas, Emperor of Persia (1587–1629). English translation by Azizeh Azodi. Los Angeles: Ketab Corporation. ISBN 978-1595845672.
- Bosworth, C.E.; Savory, R.M. (1989). "Amīr-al-Omarāʾ". In Yarshater, Ehsan (ed.). Encyclopædia Iranica. Vol. I/9: Alp Arslan–ʿAbd-al-Hamīd (Online ed.). Encyclopædia Iranica Foundation. pp. 969–971.
- Bryer, Anthony (1975). "Greeks and Türkmens: The Pontic Exception". Dumbarton Oaks Papers. 29: 136. doi:10.2307/1291371. ISSN 0070-7546. JSTOR 1291371.
- Casale, Sinem Arcak (2023). Gifts in the Age of Empire: Ottoman-Safavid Cultural Exchange, 1500–1639. University of Chicago Press. ISBN 978-0226820422.
- Charanis, Peter (July 1970). "Trébizonde en Colchide. Emile Janssens". Speculum. 45 (3). doi:10.2307/2853515. JSTOR 2853515.
- Cleveland, William L.; Bunton, Martin (2013). A History of the Modern Middle East (5th ed.). Westview Press. ISBN 9780813348339.
- Dale, Stephen Frederic (2020). "Turks, Turks and türk Turks: Anatolia, Iran and India in Comparative Perspective". In Peacock, A.C.S.; McClary, Richard Piran (eds.). Turkish History and Culture in India: Identity, Art and Transregional Connections. Brill. pp. 56–87. doi:10.1163/9789004437364_004. ISBN 978-90-04-43736-4.
- Dickson, M. B.; Welch, S. C. (1981). The Houghton Shahnameh. Vol. 1. Cambridge Mass.: Harvard University Press. OCLC 8238547.
- Doerfer, G. (1988). "Azerbaijani viii. Azeri Turkish". In Yarshater, Ehsan (ed.). Encyclopædia Iranica. Vol. III/3: Azerbaijan IV–Bačča(-ye) Saqqā (Online ed.). Encyclopædia Iranica Foundation. pp. 245–248.
- Eraly, Abraham (2007). Emperors of the Peacock Throne: The Saga of the Great Moghuls. Penguin Books. ISBN 978-93-5118-093-7.
- Fisher, William Bayne; Avery, P.; Hambly, G.R.G.; Melville, C. (1986). The Cambridge History of Iran. Vol. 6. Cambridge University Press. ISBN 978-0521200943.
- Fleischer, Cornell H. (14 March 2018). "A Mediterranean Apocalypse: Prophecies of Empire in the Fifteenth and Sixteenth Centuries". Journal of the Economic and Social History of the Orient. 61 (1–2): 18–90. doi:10.1163/15685209-12341443. ISSN 0022-4995.
- Floor, Willem (2013). "The Role of Azerbaijani Turkish in Safavid Iran". Iranian Studies. 46 (4): 569–581. doi:10.1080/00210862.2013.784516. S2CID 161700244.
- Ghasemi, Shapour. "History of Iran: Safavid Empire 1502-1736". IranChamber.com. Iran Chamber Society.
- Ghereghlou, Kioumars (October–December 2017). "Chronicling a Dynasty on the Make: New Light on the Early Ṣafavids in Ḥayātī Tabrīzī's Tārīkh (961/1554)". Journal of the American Oriental Society. 137 (4): 805–832. doi:10.7817/jameroriesoci.137.4.0805 – via Columbia Academic Commons.
- Ghereghlou, Kioumars (2016). "Ḥaydar Ṣafavi". In Yarshater, Ehsan (ed.). Encyclopædia Iranica (Online ed.). Encyclopædia Iranica Foundation.
- Ghereghlou, Kioumars (May 2011). "Review of The Practice of Politics in Safavid Iran: Power, Religion and Rhetoric". Iranian Studies. 44 (3): 421–426. ISSN 0021-0862. JSTOR 23033266.
- Grey, Charles, ed. (1873). A Narrative of Italian Travels in Persia, in the Fifteenth and Sixteenth Centuries. London: Hakluyt Society.
- Haneda, M. (1986). "Army iii. Safavid Period". In Yarshater, Ehsan (ed.). Encyclopædia Iranica. Vol. II/5: Armenia and Iran IV–Art in Iran I (Online ed.). Encyclopædia Iranica Foundation. pp. 503–506.
- Heß, Michael R. (2020). "Xǝtai". In Fleet, Kate; Krämer, Gudrun; Matringe, Denis; Nawas, John; Rowson, Everett (eds.). Encyclopaedia of Islam (3rd ed.). Brill Online. ISSN 1873-9830.
- Housley, Norman (1992). The Later Crusades, 1274–1580: From Lyons to Alcazar. Oxford University Press. ISBN 978-0-19-822137-1.
- Jahangir (1999). The Jahangirnama: Memoirs of Jahangir, Emperor of India. Translated, edited, and annotated by Wheeler M. Thackston. New York: Freer Gallery of Art, Arthur M. Sackler Gallery in association with Oxford University Press. ISBN 978-0-19-512718-8.
- Javadi, H.; Burrill, K. (1998). "Azerbaijan x. Azeri Literature in Iran". In Yarshater, Ehsan (ed.). Encyclopædia Iranica. Vol. III/3: Azerbaijan IV–Bačča(-ye) Saqqā (Online ed.). Encyclopædia Iranica Foundation. pp. 251–255.
- Kamal, Muhammad (2006). Mulla Sadra's Transcendent Philosophy. Ashgate Publishing. ISBN 978-0754652717.
- Karakaya-Stump, Ayfer (2020). Kizilbash-Alevis in Ottoman Anatolia Sufism, Politics and Community. Edinburgh University Press.
- Kia, Mana (2014). "Imagining Iran before Nationalism: Geocultural Meanings of Land in Azar's Atashkadeh". In Aghaie, Kamran Scot; Marashi, Afshin (eds.). Rethinking Iranian Nationalism and Modernity. University of Texas Press. pp. 89–112.
- Lapidus, Ira M. (2014). A History of Islamic Societies (3rd ed.). Cambridge University Press. ISBN 978-0-521-51430-9.
- Masters, Bruce (2009). "Baghdad". In Ágoston, Gábor; Masters, Bruce (eds.). Encyclopedia of the Ottoman Empire. New York: Facts on File. p. 71. ISBN 978-0-8160-6259-1. LCCN 2008020716. Archived from the original on 16 May 2016.
- Matthee, Rudi (2008). "Safavid Dynasty". In Yarshater, Ehsan (ed.). Encyclopædia Iranica (Online ed.). Encyclopædia Iranica Foundation. Archived from the original on 25 May 2022.
- Mazzaoui, Michel M. (2002). "Najm-e Ṯāni". In Yarshater, Ehsan (ed.). Encyclopædia Iranica (Online ed.). Encyclopædia Iranica Foundation.
- Meserve, M. (2014). "The Sophy: How News of Shah Ismail Savafi Spread in Renaissance Europe". Journal of Early Modern History. 18: 1–30.
- Metz, Helen Chapin (1989). Iran: A Country Study. Federal Research Division, Library of Congress.
- Mikaberidze, Alexander, ed. (2011). Conflict and Conquest in the Islamic World: A Historical Encyclopedia. Vol. 1. Santa Barbara: ABC-CLIO. ISBN 978-1-59884-336-1.
- Mikaberidze, Alexander (2015). Historical Dictionary of Georgia (2nd ed.). Rowman & Littlefield. ISBN 978-1442241466.
- Minorsky, V. (1942). "The Poetry of Shāh Ismā'īl I". Bulletin of the School of Oriental and African Studies. 10 (4): 1006a–1053a. doi:10.1017/S0041977X00090182. JSTOR 609140. S2CID 159929872.
- Mitchell, Colin P. (2009). The Practice of Politics in Safavid Iran: Power, Religion and Rhetoric. I.B. Tauris. ISBN 978-0857715883.
- Momen, M. (1985). An Introduction to Shi'i Islam. Yale University Press. ISBN 0-300-03499-7.
- Nesibli, Nesib (2002). "Osmanlı-Safevî Savaşları, Mezhep Meselesi ve Azerbaucan". Türkler (in Turkish). Vol. 6. Ankara: Yeni Türkiye Yayınları. ISBN 975-6782-39-0.
- Newman, Andrew J. (2008). Safavid Iran: Rebirth of a Persian Empire. I.B. Tauris. ISBN 9780857716613.
- Rastegar, Soussie; Vanzan, Anna, eds. (2007). Muraqqa'e Sharqi: Studies in Honor of Peter Chelkowski. San Marino: AIEP Editore. ISBN 978-88-6086-010-1.
- Rayfield, Donald (2013). Edge of Empires: A History of Georgia. Reaktion Books. ISBN 978-1780230702.
- Roy, Kaushik (2014). Military Transition in Early Modern Asia, 1400–1750: Cavalry, Guns, Government and Ships. Bloomsbury Publishing. ISBN 978-1780938004.
- Roemer, H.R. (1986). "The Safavid Period". In Jackson, Peter; Lockhart, Laurence (eds.). The Cambridge History of Iran. Vol. 6. Cambridge University Press. pp. 189–350. ISBN 9780521200943.
- Savory, Roger (1997). "Ebn Bazzāz". In Yarshater, Ehsan (ed.). Encyclopædia Iranica. Vol. VIII/1: Ebn ʿAyyāš–Economy V (Online ed.). Encyclopædia Iranica Foundation.
- Savory, Roger; Karamustafa, Ahmet T. (1998). "Esmāʿīl I Ṣafawī". In Yarshater, Ehsan (ed.). Encyclopædia Iranica. Vol. VIII/6: Eršād al-zerāʿa–Eʿteżād-al-Salṭana (Online ed.). Encyclopædia Iranica Foundation.
- Savory, Roger (2007) [Originally published 1980]. Iran under the Safavids. Cambridge University Press. ISBN 978-0521042512.
- Savory, Roger M. (1977). "Safavid Persia". In Holt, P. M.; Lambton, Ann K. S.; Lewis, Bernard (eds.). The Cambridge History of Islam. Vol. 1A. Cambridge University Press. pp. 394–429. doi:10.1017/CHOL9780521219464.015. ISBN 978-1-139-05502-4.
- Savory, Roger M. (1999). "Safavids". In Burke, Peter; Inalcik, Halil (eds.). History of Humanity: Scientific and Cultural Development, Volume V: From the Sixteenth to the Eighteenth Century. Routledge.
- Savory, Roger (2012) [1995]. "Ṣafawids". In Bosworth, C. E.; van Donzel, E. J.; Heinrichs, W. P.; Lewis, B.; Pellat, Ch.; Schacht, J. (eds.). Encyclopaedia of Islam, Second Edition. Vol. 8. Leiden: Brill Publishers. doi:10.1163/1573-3912_islam_COM_0964. ISBN 978-90-04-16121-4.
- Shahbazi, Alireza Shapur (2005). "The History of the Idea of Iran". In Curtis, Vesta (ed.). Birth of the Persian Empire. London: I.B. Tauris.
- Shaw, Stanford Jay (1976). History of the Ottoman Empire and Modern Turkey. Vol. 1. Cambridge University Press. ISBN 0-521-21280-4.
- Sicker, Martin (2000). The Islamic World in Ascendancy: From the Arab Conquests to the Siege of Vienna. Greenwood Publishing Group. ISBN 978-0275968922.
- Sinclair, T. A. (1989). Eastern Turkey: An Architectural & Archaeological Survey. Vol. 2. Pindar Press. ISBN 9781904597759.
- Soucek, P. P. (1982). "ʿAbd-al-Bāqī Yazdī". In Yarshater, Ehsan (ed.). Encyclopædia Iranica. Vol. I/1: Āb–ʿAbd-al-Hamīd (Online ed.). Encyclopædia Iranica Foundation. pp. 105–106.
- Streusand, Douglas E. (2010). Islamic Gunpowder Empires: Ottomans, Safavids, and Mughals. Boulder: Westview Press. ISBN 978-0-8133-9194-6.
- Tapper, Richard (1997). Frontier Nomads of Iran: A Political and Social History of the Shahsevan. Cambridge University Press. ISBN 978-0521583367.
- Youssef-Jamali, Mohammad Karim (1981). Life and Personality of S̲hāh Ismāʻīl I (1487–1524) (PhD thesis). University of Edinburgh.

Ismail I Safavid dynasty Born: 17 July 1487 Died: 23 May 1524
Iranian royalty
New creation	Shah of Iran; 1501–1524	Succeeded by Tahmasp I
