= Behruzeh Khanum =

Persian consort

Behruzeh Khanum (Persian: بهروزه خانم; 16th-century) was a consort of shah Ismail I of Persia (r. 1501–1524).

After entering the Safavid imperial harem as a slave concubine, she became the third wife of Ismail I.
