= Shāhnāmah Shāh Ismaʿīl (Tabriz, 1541) =

Shāhnāmah Shāh Ismaʿīl

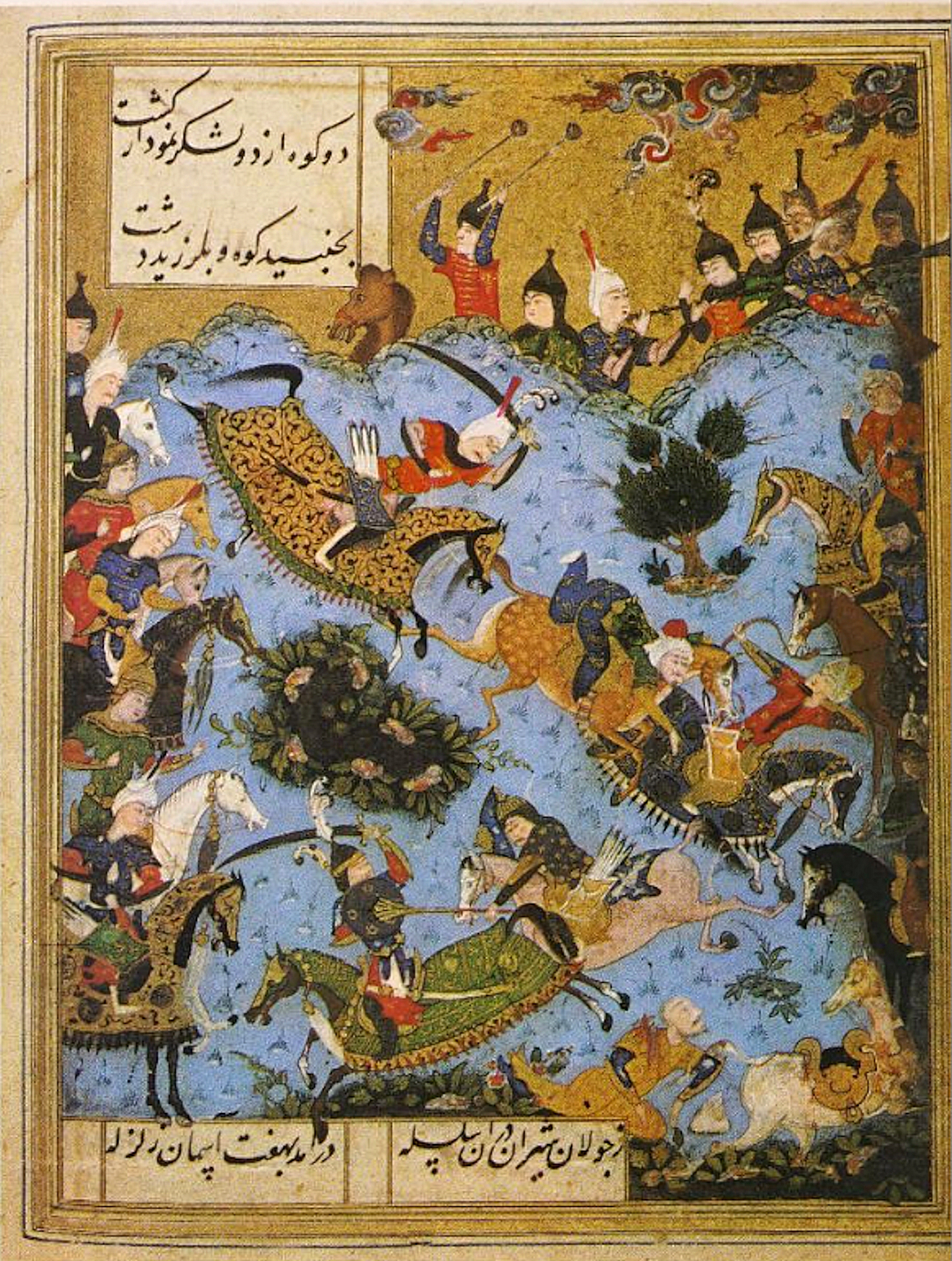
Shah Ismail defeating the ruler of Shirvan in battle. Shāhnāmah Shāh Ismaʿīl, 1541 (British Library, Add. 7784, folio 46b).

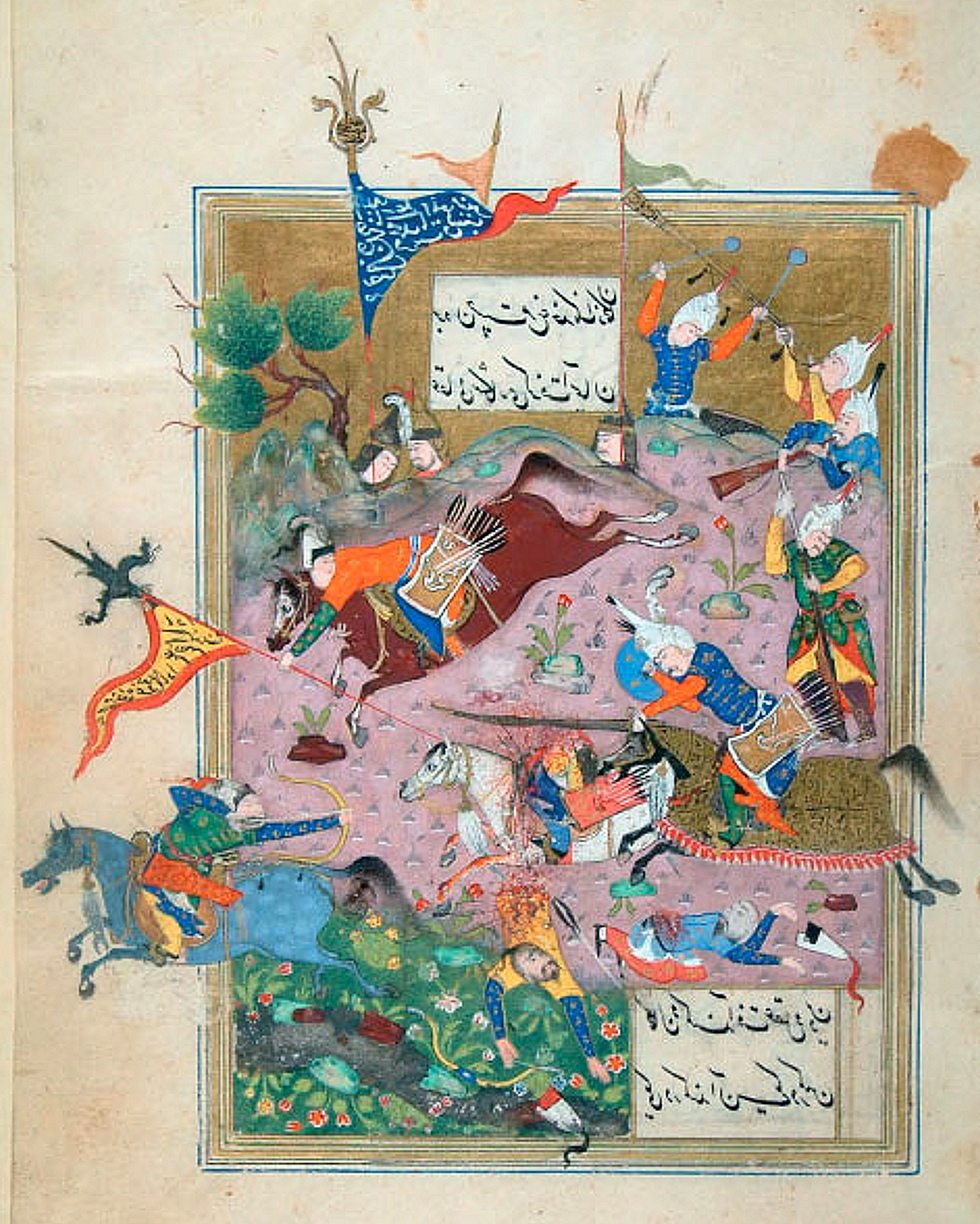
Shāh Ismaʿīl in battle. Shāhnāmah Shāh Ismaʿīl, 1541 (British Library, Add. 7784, folio 107v)

The Shāhnāmah Shāh Ismaʿīl (Tabriz, 1541), Shahnama-yi Isma'il or Shahnama-i Qasimi (شاهنامهء شاه اسمعيل) is a panegyric historical epic of Shah Ismail, founder of the Safavid Empire, inspired by the more general format of the Shāhnāmeh, although not a Shanameh itself in the traditional sense. The manuscript is located in the British Library, inventory code Add. 7784.

== Content ==
The manuscript was originally commissioned by Shah Ismail himself, and written by Mirza Kazim of Junabad or Gunabad in Khurasan ("Qasimi", Qāsimī Gunābādī, Mīr Muḥammad Qāsim, d. 1574-5), and believed to have been completed in A.H. 948 (A.D. 1541). The manuscript was started at the time of Shah Isma’il (r. 1502–1529), but could only be finished after his death.

The manuscript contains 13 miniatures, in whole-page style. The manuscript covers historical events from the time of Sultan Haydar, to the conquest of Khorasan from the Uzbeks by Shah Ismail in A.H.914 (1508-09 CE).

- Folio 46b: Battle of Sharür. Shah Ismā'īl defeats the army of Alvand, leading to the conquest of Azerbayjan and the establishment of Shah Ismā'īl in Tabriz.

== Style ==
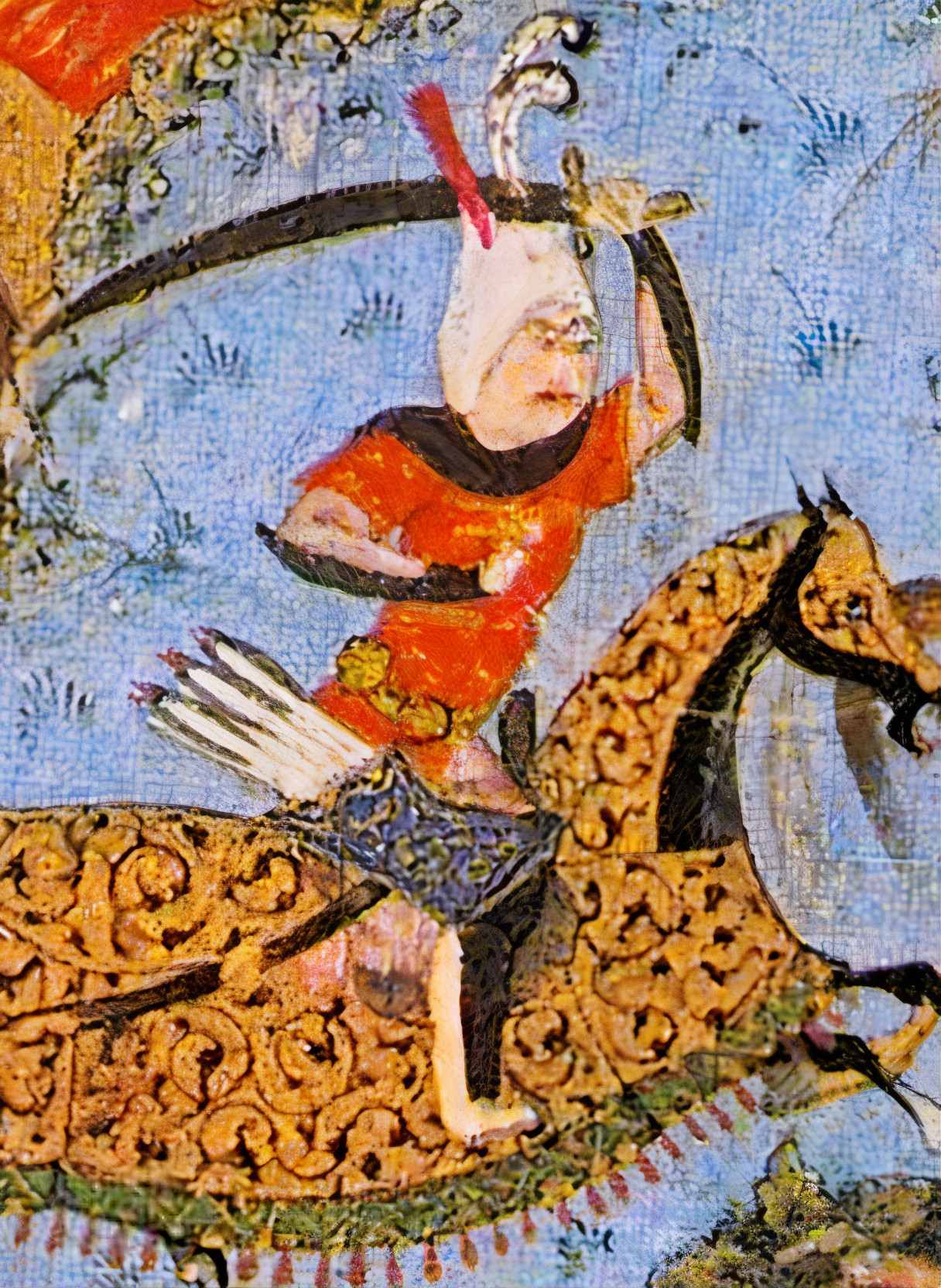
Shāh Ismaʿīl in battle in 1501. Folio 107v. Shāhnāmah Shāh Ismaʿīl, 1541, Tabriz (British Library, Add. 7784).

The manuscript offers some very interesting illustrations in lively style, which, stylistically, are witnesses to the persistence of the Turkoman element in the creations of Tabriz around 1541. The motif of coloured clouds painted on the golden background of the sky is typical of Tabriz work.

== Another Shahnamah Shah Ismaʿil ==
Another Shāhnāmah Shāh Ismaʿīl (Bodleian Library, MS. Elliot 328) is also known from the same period (circa 1540, on circumstancial grounds). It is more provincial in style but also shows undisguised and rather gruesome scene of conquest, such as the time when a defender of Firuzkuh was roasted on a spit.

== See also ==
- Safavid conquest of Shirvan
