= Monument to Shah Ismail Khatai =

Monument in Baku, Azerbaijan

- Azerbaijani: Şah İsmayıl Xətainin heykəli Persian: بنای یادبود شاه اسماعیل ختایی
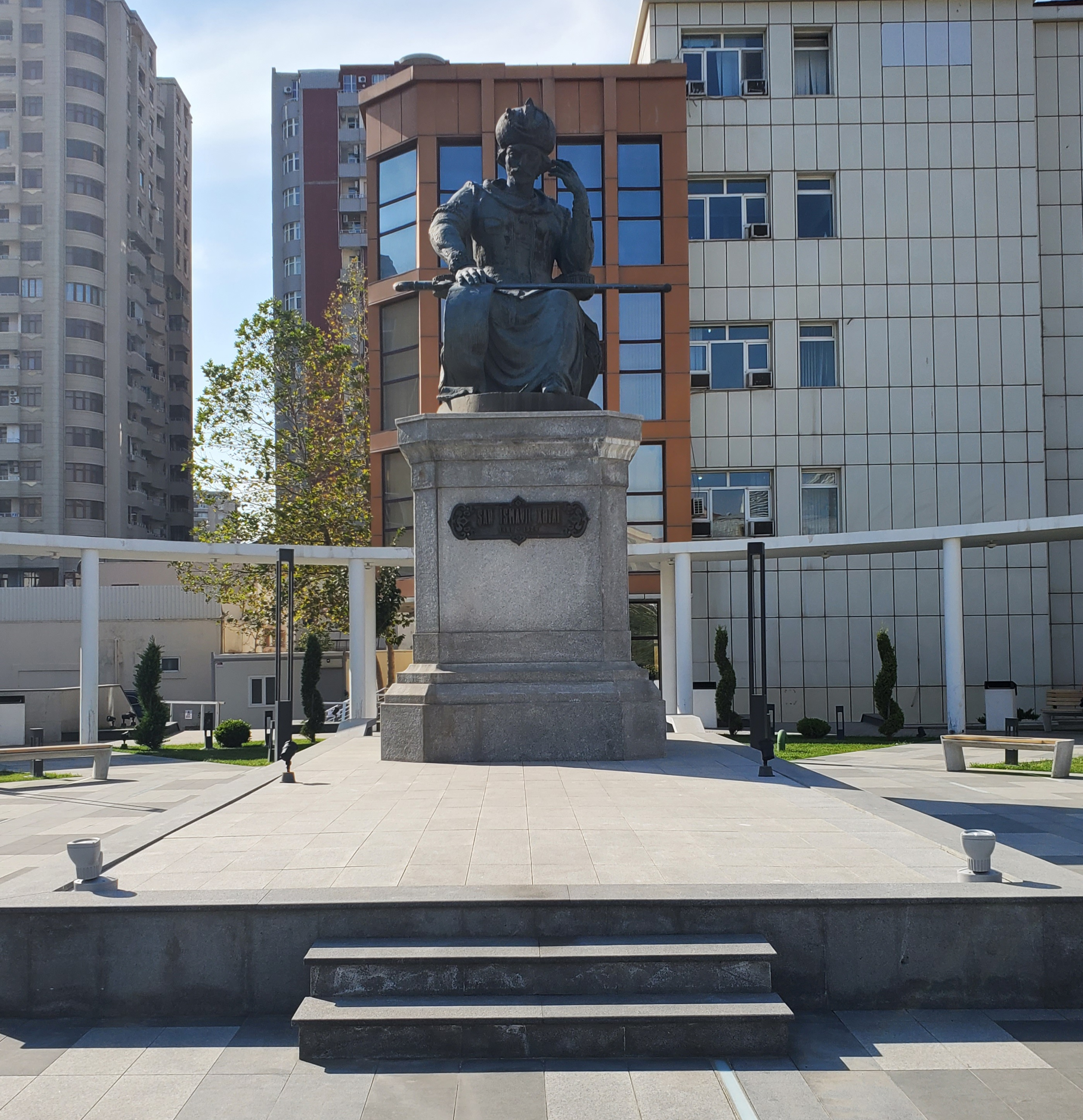
- Interactive map of Monument to Shah Ismail Khatai
- Location: Baku, Azerbaijan
- Coordinates: 40°22′54″N 49°51′49″E
- Designer: Ibrahim Zeynalov, Zakir Mehtiyev
- Material: Bronze
- Opening date: 1993
- Dedicated to: Ismail I

Monument to Shah Ismail Khatai is a monument raised on one of the streets of Baku (Azerbaijan) in the honour of Shah Ismail Khatai, the Iranian king of Safavid Iran.

== History ==
The monument was raised in 1993 at the intersection of Yusif Safarov and Mehdi Mehdizade streets, in the front of the Khatai metro station in Baku. The sculptors of the monument are Ibrahim Zeynalov, the Honored Art Worker of the Azerbaijan SSR, People's Artist of the Azerbaijan SSR, and Zakir Mehdiyev Honored Artist of Azerbaijan Republic Honored Artist of Azerbaijan Republic, and the architects are P. Huseynov, and G. Aliyev.

The monument is made of bronze and granite.

In 2007, the pedestal of the monument was reconstructed, the monument was faced with slabs of pink granite, and the sculpture itself was restored. Also, work was carried out on the landscaping of the park around the monument.

In 2017, during the expansion of the carriageway of Yusif Safarov Street, the alley was liquidated, but the Khatai monument was preserved. In 2020, the monument was moved to a new park.
