= Gifts in the Age of Empire =

2023 non-fiction book

Gifts in the Age of Empire: Ottoman-Safavid Cultural Exchange, 1500–1639
- Author: Sinem Arcak Casale
- Publisher: University of Chicago Press
- Publication date: 2023
- ISBN: 978-0-226-82042-2

Gifts in the Age of Empire: Ottoman-Safavid Cultural Exchange, 1500–1639 is a non-fiction book written by Sinem Arcak Casale about the role of material gifts between Safavid Iran and the Ottoman Empire. It was published in 2023 by the University of Chicago Press.

== General references ==
- Baltacıoğlu-Brammer, Ayşe (April 2025). "Gifts in the Age of Empire: Ottoman-Safavid Cultural Exchange, 1500-1639. Sinem Arcak Casale (Chicago: University of Chicago Press, 2023). Pp. 288. Cloth $55.00. ISBN 9780226820422". Iranian Studies. 58 (2): 372–374. doi:10.1017/irn.2025.21. ISSN 0021-0862.
- Emami, Farshid (October 2024). "Gifts in the Age of Empire: Ottoman-Safavid Cultural Exchange, 1500–1639 , by Sinem Arcak Casale: Chicago: University of Chicago Press, 2023. 326 pp.; 108 color ills. $55, cloth". The Art Bulletin. 106 (4): 124–126. doi:10.1080/00043079.2024.2401778. ISSN 0004-3079.
- Fetvaci, Emine (2024-12-01). "Sinem Arcak Casale. Gifts in the Age of Empire: Ottoman-Safavid Cultural Exchange, 1500–1639 ". The American Historical Review. 129 (4): 1772–1773. doi:10.1093/ahr/rhae373. ISSN 0002-8762.
- Işıksel, Güneş (March 2024). "Gifts in the Age of Empire: Ottoman-Safavid Cultural Exchange, 1500–1639 by Sinem Arcak Casale (review)". Journal of the Ottoman and Turkish Studies Association. 11 (1): 268–270. doi:10.2979/tur.00037. ISSN 2376-0702.
- Stanley, Tim (2025-05-01). "Gifts in the Age of Empire: Ottoman–Safavid Cultural Exchange, 1500–1639 By Sinem Arcak Casale". Journal of Islamic Studies. 36 (2): 309–312. doi:10.1093/jis/etae042. ISSN 0955-2340.
