= Jaʽfar =

- Pronunciation: Arabic: [ˈʤaʕ.far] Egyptian Arabic: [ˈgæʕ.fɑɾ]
- Gender: Male

Origin
- Origin: Arabic
- Meaning: "stream”

Other names
- Alternative spelling: Jafar, Jaffar, Jafer, Jaffer, Jafur, Jaafar, Gafar, Gaafar, Cafer, Cəfər, Džafer, Xhafer, Japar, Zhapar
- Related names: Jifar (name)

Jaʽfar (Arabic: جَعْفَر), meaning in Arabic "stream", is a masculine name of Arabic origin, common among Middle Eastern and Muslim men, especially in Iran.

It may also be written Jafar, Jaffar, Jafer, Jaafar, or in the Egyptian Arabic pronunciation, Gafar or Gaafar.

The Turkish transliteration of the name is Cafer, in Azerbaijani Cəfər, in Bosniak Džafer, in Kyrgyz Japar, in Kazakh Zhapar, and in Albanian Xhafer.

== Historical persons ==
- Ja'far ibn Abi Talib (590–629), companion of Muhammad, older brother of Ali
- Jafar ibn Ali (died 680), son of Ali and Umm ul-Banin
- Ja'far al-Sadiq (702–765), descendant of Ali, sixth imam of Shia Islam
- Ja'far ibn Abdallah al-Mansur, (743–767) was the elder son of caliph al-Mansur.
- Ja'far ibn Yahya (767–803), one of the Barmakids, vizier of Caliph Harun al-Rashid
- Abu Jaafar al-Mansur, 7th-century Abbasid caliph
- Ja'far al-Mutawakkil (822–861), the tenth Abbasid caliph
- Abu Ma'shar Jaʿfar ibn Muhammad al-Balkhi (787–886), Persian scholar
- Mir Jafar (1691–1765), military commander who betrayed the Nawab of Bengal Siraj ud-Daulah
- Mir Jafar Dasni (died 841), a rebel, who rebelled against Abbasid caliph al-Mu'tasim
- Ja'far ibn Mansur al-Yaman (fl. 10th century), Ismaili theologian
- Ja'far ibn Fallah (died 971), Kutama Berber general of the Fatimids
- Ja'far ibn al-Furat (921–1001), Ikhshidid and Fatimid vizier
- Jafar ibn Ali al-Hadi (c.840–c.885), son of the tenth imam of Twelver Shia Islam, Ali al-Hadi, and a founder of the Ja'fariyya sect
- Ja'far ibn Muhammad al-Hasani (died 876/7), first Sharif of Mecca
- Ja'far al-Mufawwid, Abbasid prince and heir-apparent of Caliph al-Mu'tamid
- Ja'far al-Muqtadir (895–832), the eighteenth Abbasid caliph
- Jafar Tabrizi (also known as Farīd al-Dīn and Qeblat al-Kottāb), 15th century master in calligraphy as well as a poet and scribe
- Ja'far ibn Sa'id (died 1764/5), Sharif of Mecca
- Jafar Khan (died 1789), King of Persia

== Modern persons ==
=== Given name ===
==== Jafar ====
- Ja'afar Mahmud Adam (1960–2007), Nigerian Islamic scholar
- Jafar Alam (born 1957), Bangladeshi politician and Member of Parliament
- Jafar Alizadeh (born 1956), Iranian wrestler
- Jafar Arias (born 1995), Curaçaoan footballer
- Jafar al-Askari (1887–1936), prime minister of Iraq
- Jafar Bazri, (born 1987), Iranian footballer
- Jafar Bolhari (born 1948), Iranian psychiatrist
- Jafar Ebrahimi, Iranian poet
- Jafar al-Hakim (born 1965), Shiite Ayatollah in Najaf, Iraq
- Jafar Hidayatullah (born 2003), Indonesian badminton player
- Jafar Iqbal (born 1999), Bangladeshi footballer
- Jafar Irismetov (born 1976), Uzbekistan footballer and coach
- Jafar Jabbarli (1899–1934), Azerbaijani playwright, poet, director and screenwriter
- Jafar Dhia Jafar (born 1943), Iraqi nuclear physicist
- Jafar Khan Jamali (1911–1967), Indian politician, tribal chief and an All-India Muslim League veteran from Balochistan
- Jafar Kazemi (1964–2011), Iranian political prisoner sentenced to death and hanged for co-operation with the Iranian opposition group PMOI
- Jafar Mokhtarifar (born 1957), Iranian footballer
- Jafar Panahi (born 1960), Iranian filmmaker
- Jafar Salmasi (1918–2000), Iranian weightlifter
- Jafar Shafaghat (c.1915–2000), Iranian General officer in the Iranian Pahlavi Army
- Jafar Shahidi (1918–2008), scholar of Persian language and literature and historian of Islam
- Jafar Sharif-Emami (1910–1998), Prime minister of Iran
- Jafar Sobhani (born 1929), Iranian Shia Marja
- Jafar Shojouni (1932–2016) Iranian Shia cleric and politician who served a member of the Parliament of Iran
- Jafar Towfighi (born 1956), Iranian engineer and politician
- Jafar Zafarani (born 1947), Iranian mathematician
- Jafar Umar Thalib (1961–2019), Indonesian ulama and Islamic political figure

==== Jaafar ====
- Jaafar Abbas, Sudanese writer and journalist
- Jaafar Abdul Karim (born 1981), German journalist and TV presenter
- Jaafar Abdul Aziz (born 1947), Bruneian aristocrat, businessman and retired general
- Jaafar al-Sadr (born 1970), Iraqi politician
- Jaafar Jaafar, Nigerian journalist
- Jaafar Jackson (born 1996), American singer and actor
- Jaafar Mohammed Saad (1950–2015), Yemeni politician and soldier
- Jaafar Muhammad (1838–1919), Malaysian politician
- Jaafar Munroe, Trinidadian footballer
- Jaafar Sheikh Mustafa (born 1950), Kurdish politician
- Jaafar Shenaishil (born 2003), Iraqi footballer
- Ku Jaafar Ku Shaari (born 1957), Malaysian diplomat

==== Ja'far ====
- Ja'far Kashfi, Persian philosopher of 19th century
- Ja'far Modarres-Sadeghi (born 1954), Iranian novelist and editor
- Ja'far Pishevari (1893–1947), Iranian politician
- Ja'afar Touqan (1938–2014), Palestinian-Jordanian architect

==== Jaffar ====
- Jaffar Idukki (born 1971), Indian impressionist and actor in Malayalam film
- Jaffer Zaidi, Pakistani musician and lead vocalist of the Pakistani band Kaavish

==== Jaffer ====
- Jaffer Rahimtoola (1870–1914), Indian barrister

==== Cafer ====
- Cafer Çağatay (1899–1991), Turkish footballer
- Cafer Osman Topçı (1921–1944), Crimean Tatar officer in the Soviet Army
- Cafer Sadık Kutlay (1912–1988), Turkish businessman, civil engineer and politician
- Cafer Seydamet Qırımer (1889–1960), Crimean Tatar politician and writer
- Cafer Tayyar Eğilmez (1877–1958), Turkish politician
- Cafer Tosun (born 1999), Turkish footballer

Džafer

- Džafer Kulenović (1891–1956), Yugoslav politician who led the Yugoslav Muslim Organization in the Kingdom of Yugoslavia, and was briefly government minister

==== Gaafar ====
- Gaafar Nimeiry (1930–2009), President of Sudan

==== Xhafer ====
- Xhafer Bej Ypi (1880–1940), Albanian politician
- Xhafer Deva (1904–1978), Kosovo Albanian politician
- Xhafer Spahiu (1923–1999), Albanian politician

=== Middle name ===
- Abdul Halim Jaffer Khan (1927–2017), Indian sitar player
- C. K. Jaffer Sharief or Challakere Kareem Jaffer Sharief (1933–2018), Indian politician
- Akif Jafar Hajiyev (1937–2015), Azerbaijani mathematician
- Mir Jafar Baghirov (1896–1956), Azerbaijani communist leader under the Soviet rule
- Mufti Jafar Hussain (1914–1983), Pakistani Shia mujtahid and political leader
- Ali Jaafar Mohamed Madan (born 1995), Bahraini footballer
- Mohammad Jafar Mahallati, Iranian scholar of Islamic studies and a former diplomat
- Mohammad Jafar Mahjoub (1924–1996), Iranian scholar of Persian literature, essayist, translator and teacher
- Muhammad Jafar Moravej (1910–1999), Iranian Cleric
- Mohammad Jafar Montazeri (born 1949), Iranian cleric and judge and the current Attorney-General of Iran
- Mohammad Jafar Moradi (born 1990), Iranian long distance runner
- Musa Bin Jaafar Bin Hassan (born 1950), Omani diplomat and academic
- Mustafa Jaffer Sabodo (1942–2024), Tanzanian economist, consultant and businessman
- Mohammad Jafar Yahaghi (born 1947), Persian writer, literary critic, editor and translator
- Sayed Jaafar Ahmed (born 1991), Bahraini footballer
- Syed Jaafar Albar (1914–1977), Malaysian politician
- Sayed Jafar Naderi (born 1965), ethnic Hazara-Ismaili who controlled Baghlan Province of Afghanistan during the early 1990s
- Seyyed Jafar Kashfi, Iranian calligrapher

=== Surname or patronymic ===
Jafar

- Adnan Jafar (born 1949), Iraqi footballer
- Badr Jafar (born 1979), Emirati business executive
- Habib Jafar (born 1966), Iraqi footballer
- Izz al-Din Jafar, 14th-century Eretnid sultan
- Jafar Dhia Jafar (born 1943), Iraqi nuclear physicist
- Mustapha Ben Jafar (born 1940), Tunisian politician and doctor
- Syed Jafar, Indian-American electrical engineer and computer scientist
- Talha Jafar (1853–1934), Ethiopian-Argobba rebel and governor

Jaafar

- Abdul Aziz Jaafar (born 1956), retired Malaysian admiral
- Azmun Jaafar (1958–2025), Indonesian civil servant and politician
- Ghazali Jaafar (1944–2019), Filipino militant and government official
- Hardi Jaafar (born 1979), Malaysian footballer
- Isham Jaafar, Bruneian doctor
- Jalaluddin Jaafar (born 1975), Malaysian footballer
- Jasim Mohammed Jaafar, Iraqi politician
- Jazeman Jaafar (born 1992), Malaysian car racer
- Karrar Jaafar (born 2006), Iraqi footballer
- Maha Jaafar (born 1994), Emirati dentist and YouTuber
- Mariam Jaafar (born 1977), Singaporean politician
- Megat Jaafar, Malaysian politician
- Mujtaba Sayed Jaafar (born 1981), Qatari footballer
- Naceur Ben Jaâfar (1923–1970), Tunisian politician and labor activist
- Omar Jaafar, Malaysian politician
- Onn Jaafar (1895–1962), Malay politician and a Menteri Besar (Chief Minister) of Johor in Malaysia, then Malaya
- Raja Jaafar (born 1941), Raja Muda (crown prince) of Perak Darul Ridzuan
- Suhaylah Abd-Jaafar (born 1964), Iraqi lawyer and activist
- Tuanku Ja’afar (1922–2008), the tenth Yang di-Pertuan Agong (King) of Malaysia from 26 April 1994 until 25 April 1999 and the tenth Yang Di-Pertuan Besar (Ruler) of Negeri Sembilan
- Wan Junaidi Tuanku Jaafar (born 1946), Malaysian politician, lawyer and retired policeman

Jaffar

- Kamarudin Jaffar (born 1951), Malaysian politician
- Said Mohamed Jaffar (1918–1993), president of the State of Comoros

Jaffer

- Armaan Jaffer (born 1998), Indian cricketer
- Jameel Jaffer (born 1971), Canadian human rights and civil liberties attorney
- Melissa Jaffer (born 1936), Australian actress
- Mobina Jaffer (born 1949), Canadian Senator
- Rahim Jaffer (born 1971), Canadian politician
- Sadaf Jaffer (born 1983), American politician and scholar
- Sayed Mohammed Jaffer (born 1985), Bahraini footballer
- Wasim Jaffer (born 1978), Indian cricketer

Džaferović

- Vanja Džaferović (born 1983), Croat-Bosnian footballer

Gaafar

- Ahmed Gaafar (born 1985), Egyptian footballer
- Farouk Gaafar (born 1952), Egyptian footballer
- Mostafa Gaafar (born 1981), Egyptian footballer

== Derived names ==
Umm Ja'far

- Zubaidah bint Ja'far, (765/66–831) also known as Umm Ja'far was an Arab Abbasid princess, wife of caliph Harun al-Rashid (r. 786–809) and mother of caliph al-Amin (r. 809–813)
- Umm Ja'far Shuja, (died 861) was the mother of Abbasid caliph al-Mutawakkil
- Shaghab (died 933), also known as Umm Ja'far, was the mother of 10th-century Abbasid caliph al-Muqtadir

== Fictional characters ==
- Jaffar, a character in The Thief of Bagdad (1940 film)
  - Jafar (Aladdin), the main antagonist (inspired by the character in The Thief of Bagdad) in the 1992 Disney animated film Aladdin, its first sequel, The Return of Jafar, and its 2019 live-action remake
    - Jafar, one of the primary antagonists in Once Upon a Time in Wonderland, based on the Aladdin character
    - Ja'far, the main protagonist in the musical Twisted, based on the Aladdin character
  - Jaffar, a character in Prince of Persia, inspired by the character in The Thief of Bagdad
- Jaffar, a character in the video game Fire Emblem: The Blazing Blade
- Ja'far, a character in the manga Magi: The Labyrinth of Magic
- Zafar, a character in the television show Aladdin – Naam Toh Suna Hoga inspired from the character of the grand vizir in Disney's Aladdin

== See also ==
- Khawlah bint Ja'far, one of the wives of the fourth Muslim Caliph Ali ibn Abi Talib
- Zubaidah bint Ja`far, granddaughter of the Abbasid caliph Al-Mansur, through his son Ja'far, a wife of Harun al-Rashid
- Jifar (name), Ethiopian variant of the name
- Jaffa
