= Parsadan Gorgijanidze =

Georgian factotum and historian in the service of the Safavids (c.1626 - c.1696)

P'arsadan Gorgijanidze (Georgian: ფარსადან გორგიჯანიძე; or Giorgijanidze, გიორგიჯანიძე; 1626 – c. 1696) was a Georgian factotum and historian in the service of the Safavids. Early in his career he served at the residence of the viceroy (vali) of Kartli, and later at the Safavid court in Isfahan. He is principally known for his informative chronicles The History of Georgia (საქართველოს ისტორია, sak’art’velos istoria).

== Career ==
Born in the town of Gori, Gorgijanidze was brought up at the local court of the Safavid viceroy (vali) of Kartli, Rostom (Rostam), in Tbilisi. He engaged in Georgian-Iranian diplomacy early in his career. In 1656, he was appointed, through the recommendation of Rostom, as a darugha (prefect) of the Safavid capital, Isfahan. Gorgijanidze converted to Islam on the occasion, entered the gholam corps, and was to spend four decades in the service of the kings (shahs) Abbas II (r. 1642–1666) and Suleiman I (r. 1666–1694).

For thirty years, Rostom had held the function of prefect of Isfahan himself; however, during this period, the actual administration was maintained by the deputy prefect, Mir Qasem Beg. Mir Qasem Beg fell eventually victim to a plot devised by grand vizier Mohammad Beg (1654–1661), and was executed. Mir Qasem Beg and Mohammad Beg had a long history of enmity between them. However, Mohammad Beg's thirst for revenge did not end with Mir Qasem Beg's death. Angered by the fact that king Abbas II had not ordered for the confiscation of Mir Qasem's property, Mohammad Beg now tried to pursue his grudge by using Gorgijanidze (the new prefect) and the incumbent divanbegi (chancellor, chief justice), Ughurlu Beg, in his scheme. He reportedly encouraged Gorgijanidze to accept bribes and use extortion. Mohammad Beg wanted to show, that if a newly appointed prefect could amass such amounts of wealth in a short period of time, then Mir Qasem Beg must have had "pocketed fantastic amounts of money" in his thirty years of holding the office as deputy. Gorgijanidze soon followed the grand vizier's advice.

Shortly after his appointment as prefect of the capital, Parsadan's harsh administrative rearrangements and new laws generated opposition from the Isfahanians, as well as his superior Ughurlu Beg, the divanbegi, who received complaints about Gorgijanidze's misgovernance. The divanbegi, apparently an enemy of the prefect, took the side of the citizens, and had a part in the rioting that ensued. Mohammad Beg, realizing that his scheme was getting thwarted by Ughurlu Beg, further molded the event to make it look like a "threat to security" for which the divanbegi should be held responsible, and blamed him for instigating the riots. Mohammad Beg convinced king Abbas II; Ughurlu Beg was removed from his post and blinded, while Parsadan was also dismissed from his post. Abbas II then appointed Parsadan as the new eshik-agha (Master of Ceremonies) of the royal court, and gave him five villages in the confines of Golpayegan as a fief. Parsadan's family remained in Kartli, but several of its members were also active in mainland Iran. Thus, one of Parsandan's brothers, Alexander, served as the zarabibash (chief of the Shah's mint) of Isfahan; another, Melik Sadat-Bek, was yuzbash (lieutenant) of the shah's army. Parsadan's son, David, was trained as an officer of the shah's guard (gholam).

Gorgijanidze found himself involved in the incessant intrigues in the Safavid administration and twice fell in disfavor with the shah. His post also allowed Gorgijanidze to intervene in the domestic politics in his native Georgia. His antagonism with Rostom's successor as ruler of Kartli, Vakhtang V (Shah Navaz Khan) undermined his position and Gorgijanidze was exiled, from 1666 to 1671, to Shushtar, the governor of which, Vakhushti Khan, was a close relative of Shah Navaz Khan's wife Rodam.

== Works ==
A manuscript of Gorgijanidze's untitled chronicle was discovered by the Georgian scholar Platon Ioseliani in 1841 and was conventionally named The History of Georgia by the 19th-century scholars of Georgia Marie-Félicité Brosset and Teimuraz Bagrationi. It is a voluminous work which seems to have been completed by the author by 1694 or 1696 while living in Isfahan. The chronicle relates the Georgian history from the ascension of Christianity in Georgia in the 4th century down to the late 17th century. Gorgijanidze's account of his contemporary events is of special value. He made extensive use of foreign, primarily Persian, historical works in order to confirm or supplement information from native Georgian sources. The chronicles contain also autobiographic information and is written in vernacular Georgian apparently because of the author's poor knowledge of the contemporary standards of Georgian literary language.

Gorgijanidze was also actively involved in the editing, versification and rewriting of the Georgian versions of the Shahnameh epic. Amongst the several major works Gorgijanidze translated into Georgian, there was the Jame-e Abbasi, a Persian book written by Sheikh Baha'i on Shia jurisprudence. He also composed a trilingual Georgian-Arabic-Persian dictionary.

== Sources ==
- Alasania, Giuli, ed. (1990). Парсадан Горгиджанидзе, История Грузии [(Parsadan Gorgijanidze, History of Georgia, translated from Georgian to Russian by R. Kiknadze and V. Puturidze)]. Tbilisi. English summary translated by R. Kiknadze available at Parsadan Gorgidjanidze Istoria Gruzii Summary
- Giunashvili, Jemshid (2016). "GORGIJANIDZE, PARSADAN". Encyclopaedia Iranica.
- Hitchins, Keith (2001). "GEORGIA vi. Iranian studies and collections in Georgia". Encyclopaedia Iranica, Vol. XV, Fasc. 3. pp. 490–493.
- Lang, David Marshall. Georgia and the Fall of the Safavid Dynasty. Bulletin of the School of Oriental and African Studies, University of London, Vol. 14, No. 3, Studies Presented to Vladimir Minorsky by His Colleagues and Friends (1952), pp. 523–539.
- Maeda, Hirotake (2007). "Parsadan Gorgijanidze's Exile to Shushtar: A Biographical Episode of a Georgian Official in the Service of the Safavid Shahs". The Journal of Sophia Asian Studies (in Japanese). 25.
- Matthee, Rudi (2012). Persia in Crisis: Safavid Decline and the Fall of Isfahan. London: I.B.Tauris. ISBN 978-1-84511-745-0.
- Paghava, I.; Turkia, S.; Akopyan, A. (2010). "The cross-in-circle mark on the silver coins of the Safavid ruler, Sultān Husayn, from the Iravān mint". Journal of the Oriental Numismatic Society. 202.
- Mikaberidze, Alexander (2015). Historical Dictionary of Georgia. Rowman & Littlefield. ISBN 978-1-44224-146-6.
- Newman, Andrew J. (2008). Safavid Iran: Rebirth of a Persian Empire. I.B.Tauris. ISBN 978-0857716613.
