= Safavid conversion of Iran to Shia Islam =

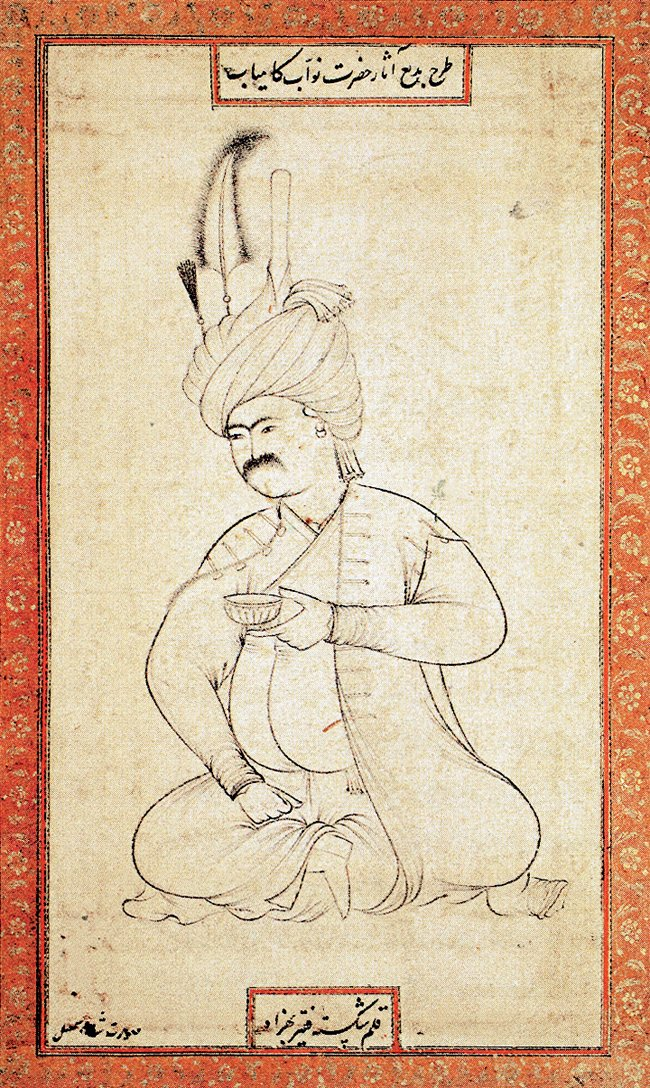
Shah Ismail I started the conversion of Iran to Shia Islam

Following their rise to power in Iran in the 16th century, the Safavid dynasty initiated a campaign of forced conversion against the Iranian populace, seeking to replace Sunni Islam, whose Shafi'i school of jurisprudence pervaded the country, as the denomination of the majority of the population.

Over the course of three centuries, the Safavids (who were Twelver Shias) heavily persecuted Sunni Muslims, Jews, Christians, and other religious groups, eventually transforming Iran into a bastion of Shia Islam. This process led to hostilities with Iran's Sunni-majority neighbours, most notably the Ottoman Empire. The Safavid campaign sought to ensure Twelver dominance among Shia Muslims, particularly with regard to Zaydism and Ismaʿilism—each of which had previously experienced their own eras of sectarian dominance.

The political climate of 18th-century Iran, the intellectual history of Twelver Shia Islam, and the final Shi'itization of the nation were all greatly influenced by the Shaykh al-Islam Mohammad-Baqer Majlesi. In addition to marking the start of a genuinely Iranian expansion within Twelver Shia Islam, Majlesi also foreshadowed the establishment by the Twelver Shia Imams of the Islamic Republic of Iran in the late 20th century.

Through their actions, the Safavids were able to establish the Shia sect as the official religion of their empire, marking a significant turning point in Islamic history, which had been universally dominated by the Sunni sect until that period. It also marked a significant turning point in Iranian history, having been the nation's first major ethnoreligious change since the Muslim conquest of Persia in the 7th century. As a direct result of the Safavid conversion campaign, Shi'a Islam remains dominant among the populations of Iran and Azerbaijan.

== Background ==
After the Islamic prophet Muhammad died in 632, a group of followers (Shia) of his cousin Ali proclaimed the latter as the legitimate heir and caliph. But the hopes of this group were not achieved for thirty years, during which time Abu Bakr, Umar, and Uthman—three of the Prophet's Companions—became caliphs. Sunni Islam was eventually represented by these caliphs. Their adherents claimed that they represented the Sunnah ("the right path"), that the vast majority of Muslims believed in. This was opposed by Ali and his followers, who also objected to the ways that Umar and Uthman had spread Islam which were not consistent with the sayings of Muhammad and the Quran. According to Shia Islam, the lineage of authority started with Ali (the first Shia Imam) and continued through the descendants of his union with Muhammad's daughter Fatima.

The twelfth and last Shia Imam, Muhammad al-Mahdi, left no offspring. In 873, he disappeared. He is regarded by Shia Muslims as the Mahdi (Messiah), and they eagerly await his return to establish what they consider rightful Shia rule. Shia Islam has been infused with a martyrdom and sorrow cult since its founding. Additionally, it has sparked a number of messianic groups that have had a significant impact on Islamic history. One of these groups was the Safavid order, who endorsed Twelver Shia Islam. The early Safavid order initially embraced Sunni beliefs. Their primary supporters, Turkoman tribes who practiced a popular form of Shia Islam, are reported to have influenced them to adopt Shia Islam under the leadership of Khvajeh Ali Safavi (died 1427). Their beliefs had little in common with orthodox Twelver Shia Islam, having originated in a frontier area where ancient beliefs mingled with mystical and millenarian components. The order grew more violent under Shaykh Junayd (died 1460), adopting an extreme brand of Shia Islam that included shamanic and animal-based components, such as the belief in metempsychosis and reincarnation, as well as the idea of a Mahdi.

Little is known about the religion situation across various cities and provinces in 15th-century Iran. A description of it appears from the earlier century by Hamdallah Mustawfi in his Nuzhat al-Qulub, which The Cambridge History of Iran describes as "fairly accurate." Mustawfi wrote that Sunni populations were dominant in major cities, while Twelver Shia Islam was concentrated in regions like Gilan, Mazandaran, Ray, Varamin, Qom, Kashan, Khuzestan, and Sabzevar in Khorasan. In the Sunni Timurid and notably, the Aq Qoyunlu period, Shia Islam was prevalent among the peasantry in various regions of Iran. In major cities, some aristocratic families were also Shia and held important administrative positions.

According to Mustawfi, the influence of the Sunni Shafi'i school was evident in almost all the places he described, whether they were populated by Sunni or Shias. According to The Cambridge History of Iran, "this provides evidence to support the supposition that the religious situation in Persia had a certain homogeneity".

== History ==
=== Under Ismail I ===
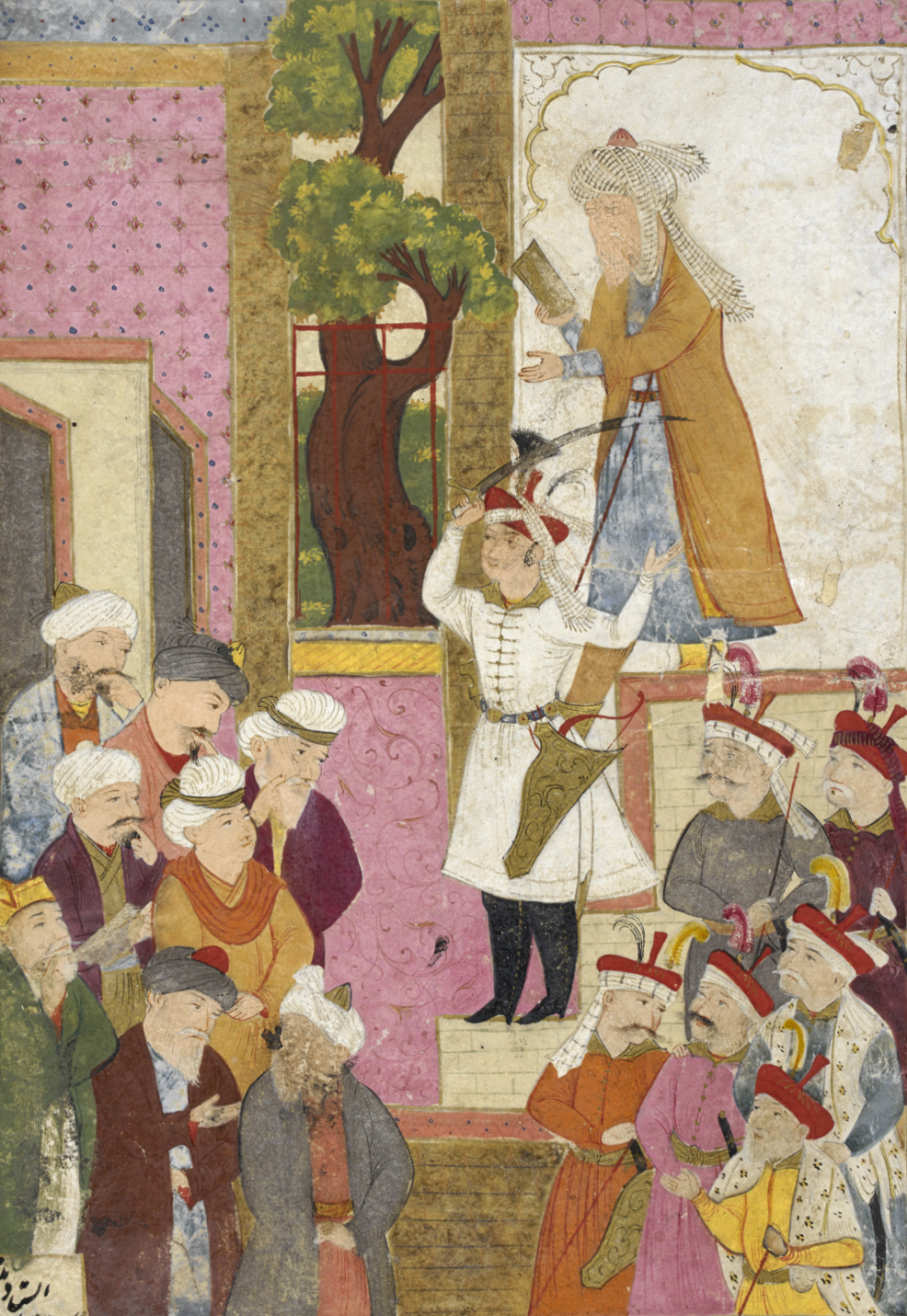
Miniature of Shah Ismail I declaring Shia Islam as the official religion of his kingdom. Stored in the British Library, London.

During the reign of the first Safavid shah (king), Ismail I (r. 1501–1524), the military, political, and religious goals of the Safavids became unified. In 1501, he proclaimed himself the King of Kings and the creator of a new Shia state, thus creating a strong ideological foundation. This choice also merged the political and religious spheres in Iran, a combination that is still present today. Ismail I shortly afterwards decreed that all mosques in his domain use the Shia version of the Islamic call to prayer. In order to establish the legitimacy of Ali, the first Shia Imam, and his lineage, the additional word in this variant, "I witness that Ali is God's friend," was added. A Shia call to prayer was heard from the minarets of an Islamic state for the first time since the 11th century. Abu Bakr, Umar, and Uthman were also ordered to be openly insulted by Ismail I's subjects according to a royal proclamation that stated, "Whoever disobeys, he is to be beheaded."

Ismail I implemented significant reforms in the Persian court and its administrative branches, and to achieve his aims he relied on the Qizilbash, a group of Turkoman soldiers. In addition to the risky actions of the Qizilbash under Ismail I's command, his support of Arab Shia jurists, initially from northern Syria and then from southern Iraq and the Arabian Peninsula, enhanced his anti-Sunni policies. Prior to this, "even the basics of the Shia law were not known; nor were the rules and rituals of the rightful Twelver Shia sect," according to the Safavid-era historian Hasan Beg Rumlu, who almost lived during the same period as Ismail I. Ismail I used many tactics early in his reign to establish his authority and convert his subjects to Shia Islam, with the aim of creating a Shia state and society. He used intimidation and coercion, possibly more out of pragmatism than faith, to wage war against his numerous opponents to the east and west. Additionally, by assigning clerics as delegates to the recently captured areas, he expanded Shia Islam.

Any opposition from the populace was met with severe repercussions. Thousands, maybe even 20,000, of Sunnis were killed at Tabriz when there first appeared opposition to the Safavids' forcible conversion. Once their Sunni religious leadership was frightened or, more commonly, killed, the populace (primarily Shafi'is), would usually cooperate. Ismail I put to death several Sunni judges, preachers, and officials who were protesting in the cities of Shiraz and Isfahan, which had been conquered by the Safavids in 1503. Ismail I's conquest of Isfahan led to a large number of Sunnis being killed, supposedly as revenge for the Aq Qoyunlu's killing of many Shia citizens of the city. During his journey to Isfahan in 1524, Portuguese traveler António Tenreiro described witnessing bones protruding from the ground, which he believed to be the remains of 5,000 individuals who had been burned alive by the Safavids. 4,000 members of the order of Sheykh Abueshaq Kazeruni were killed by Ismail I in Fars, and the tombs of their shaykhs in the area were demolished.

Despite the violence caused by Ismail I and his successors, the Safavid dynasty managed to unify the diverse local dynasties, ethnicities, and cultures that had divided Iran since the time of the Turco-Mongol ruler Timur (r. 1370–1405) a century earlier. The Safavids revitalized the Guarded Domains of Iran, a concept formed by a feeling of territorial and political uniformity in a society with shared cultural elements such as the Persian language, monarchy, and Shia Islam.

=== Under Tahmasp I ===
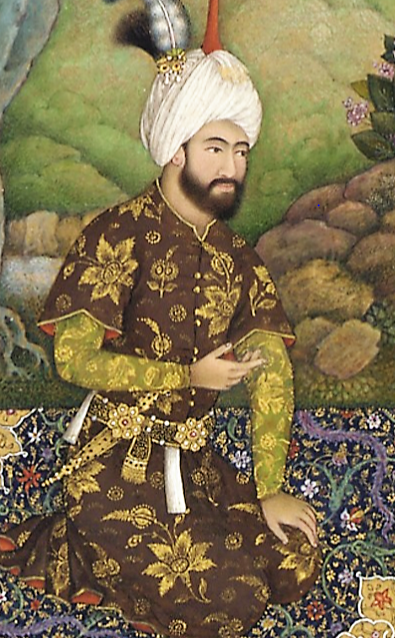
Detail of Tahmasp I by contemporary painter Farrukh Beg

In 1524, Ismail I was succeeded by his son Tahmasp I (r. 1524–1576). It was during his rule that Shia Islam in Iran solidified itself. Under Tahmasp I, clerical power was strengthened, and Shia legal scholars, Arab emigrants, and local Iranians gained powerful positions in the government and society. Their rise as an interest group was not much due to the jurists' own efforts but more due to circumstances during Tahmasp I's early reign. Because of the ongoing conflict between the Ustajlu-Shamlu and Takkelu-Turkaman Qizilbash factions, which were competing for regency, Tahmasp I had to work carefully with the Shia jurists. As he became more self-reliant, he diminished the importance of the Qizilbash's messianic beliefs and enhanced the role of the ulama (clergyhood) in Twelver Shia Islam. The religious rites and customs that would later become unique to Shia Islam started to be embraced by the Shia society. Shia Islam shaped both private and public aspects of life. In private, it influenced practices like prayer, fasting, and cleansing, as well as rules about cleanliness and gender roles according to the sharia law. Publicly, it impacted community activities such as Friday prayers, charitable endowments, and the observance of Muharram mourning rituals. According to the Cambridge History of Iran, "the modern originality of Persian Shi'ism has its roots" in Tahmasp I.

Through the office of sadr, Tahmasp I consistently advocated for the goals the sayyids (descendants of Muhammad), whom he trusted deeply. To counter accusations of heresy from their Sunni neighbors, the Safavid shahs sought to enhance their legitimacy by modifying their lineage. Even though Ismail I and possibly his father Shaykh Haydar claimed to be descendants of Ali, it was during Tahmasp I's reign that a detailed genealogy was created. This traced the Safavid family's lineage back to the eighth Shia Imam Ali ibn Musa al-Rida, who is buried in the Imam Reza shrine, the most revered location in Safavid Iran. The status of the Safavid family was enhanced due to their connections with Ali and Muhammad's family, as recognized by sources up to the 20th century.

To promote Shia Islam and religious unity, Tahmasp I made substantial efforts. In order to undermine Sunni customs, the government employed religious propagandists, which also lessened the Qizilbash's power. Tahmasp I implemented a strict code of ethics in the 1530s, but it is still unclear if it was consistently observed in urban as well as rural areas. Although there is little information on the behavior of the overall populace, royal courts are recorded to have served as performing venues for popular music and secular and romantic poetry.

=== Under Ismail II ===
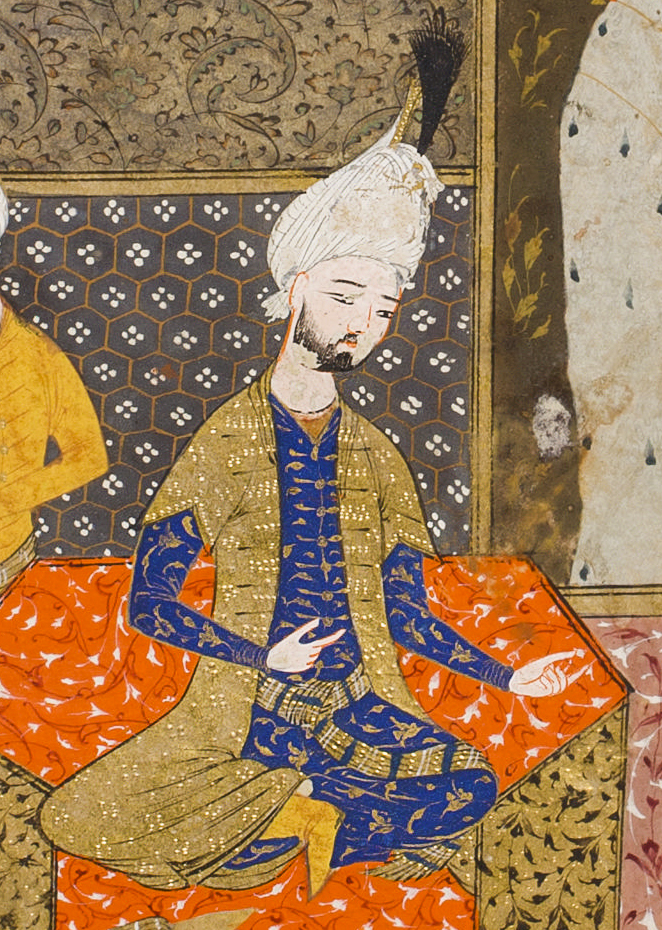
Persian miniature of Ismail II

Tahmasp I was succeeded by his son Ismail II (r. 1576–1577), who immediately decided to overturn many of the religious policies established by his father and grandfather. He opted for a kinder approach toward Sunnis and attempted to halt the anti-Sunni propaganda that had gained popularity under his father. There are several theories about why Ismail II tried to bring back Sunni Islam.

The country still had many followers of Sunni Islam. In the Safavid capital of Qazvin, the sermons of the scholar Makhdum Sharifi Shirazi gathered a large audience. The pro-Sunni actions that Ismail performed are attributed by Safavid records to Makhdum Sharifi Shirazi. According to Shia literature, Makhdum Sharifi Shirazi is the archenemy of Shia Islam, influencing Ismail II. Makhdum Sharifi Shirazi was the grandson of Tahmasp I's vizier Qadi Jahan Qazvini and claimed the prominent Sunni scholar al-Sharif al-Jurjani as his ancestor. The study of tradition and Quranic interpretation was Makhdum Sharifi Shirazi's primary education. Building a strong relationship with Ismail II, he was appointed as the co-sadr (highest religious authority) with Shah Enayatollah Esfahani, who had previously served as the military chaplain under Tahmasp I.

Ismail II worked with Makhdum Sharifi Shirazi to undo some of the Shia Islamic customs that had been practiced since the early Safavid era. These included the customary insulting of Abu Bakr, Umar, and Uthman, as well as the slander of Muhammad's wife Aisha. This resulted in an uprising in Qazvin, led by Ismail II's maternal uncle Amir Khan II Mawsellu. Ismail II also had the names of the Shia Imams removed from the walls of the primary congregational mosque in Qazvin. Abd-al-Ali ibn Nur-al-Din Ali al-Karaki and Sayyed Hosayn Karaki, two prominent Shia clerics in Qazvin, faced persecution, humiliation, and were ultimately forced to leave the city.

During debates, Ismail II actively supported Sunni arguments against the Shia ulama multiple times, thus weakening their standing and making them targets of mockery. Although the Shia ulama stayed out of Ismail II's way, they privately opposed his policies. Ismail II's pro-Sunni policies led to the royal family and Qizilbash poisoning the opium he consumed on 24 November 1577, leading to his death the following day.

=== Under Mohammad Khodabanda and Abbas the Great ===
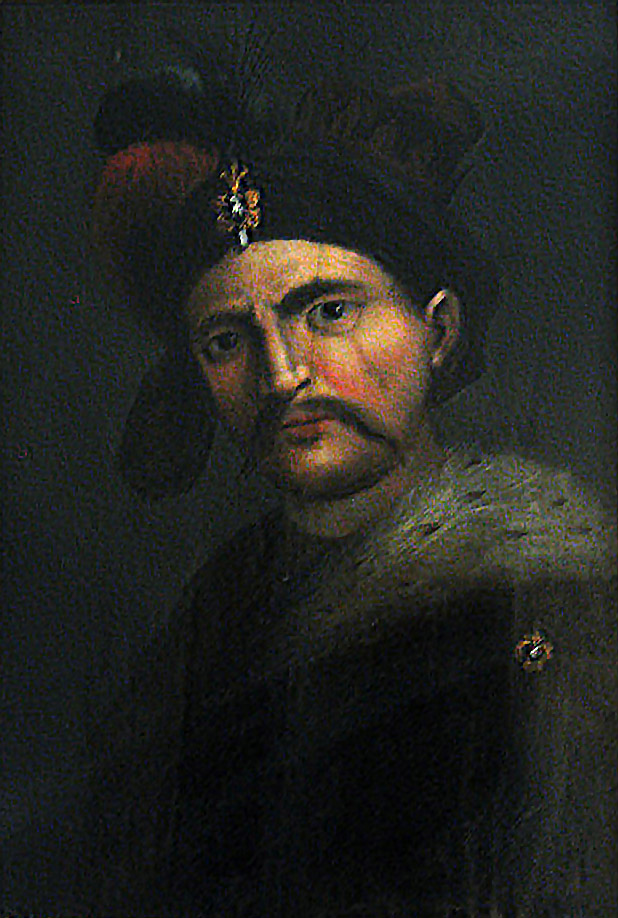
Abbas the Great

Ismail II was succeeded by Tahmasp's eldest son, Mohammad Khodabanda (r. 1578–1587), under whom Twelver Shia Islam was restored as the official religion of the realm. By the early reign of Abbas the Great in the end of the 16th century, the majority of Iranians had accepted Shia Islam and virtually, Sunni Islam had disappeared from the central Safavid provinces, only remaining on the outskirts of the realm, such as in Kurdistan, Afghanistan and Baluchistan. Some of the leaders in Ardalan and Kurds around Kermanshah also became Shia Muslims, but the majority of Kurds remained Shafi'i Muslims. There were also some Kurds who continued to adhere to Yarsanism. The northern coast of the Persian Gulf, along with much of Larestan, also remained Shafi'i Muslims, likely due to the area's long-standing trade connections with India and Arabia.

During the reign of Ismail I and Tahmasp I, there was minimal interest in collections of Shia tradition, except the writings of Husayn ibn Abd al-Samad. There was a greater push to expand and preserve Shia tradition under Abbas the Great. Shia tradition was the subject of writings by authors such as Baha al-Din al-Amili, Mir Damad, and Sayyed Ahmad Alavi. A new Persian translation of Muhammad ibn Ya'qub al-Kulayni's influential Usul al-Kafi fi 'Ilm al-Din was also published during the reign of Abbas I. The juridical encyclopedia that was most widely used was Jame-e Abbasi by Baha al-Din al-Amili, which Abbas I had ordered. It covered topics such as Islamic customs, the correct birth and death dates of the Imams, monetary donations, sales, marriage, divorce, vows, atonement, and criminal law. Abbas I instructed that Jame-e Abbasi be delivered in "a clear, comprehensible language in order that all people, the learned and the lay, would seek benefit from it," in a deliberate attempt to provide an example of Persianized Shia Islam to the Iranians.

The works that Abbas I commissioned catered to a broad audience, in contrast to the expert texts written by the ulama. Jame-e Abbasi marked a turning point in the spread of Shia legal literature by promoting unification throughout the realm. Around 1614, Abbas I appears to have forced Christians and Jews to convert to Islam and converted a number of churches in Georgia to mosques. Approximately 30,000 Georgian prisoners were forced into becoming Muslims between 1614 and 1616. Abbas I did not have a consistent policy towards non-Muslims in his empire. Instead, he adjusted his approach based on the specific historical situations and what was politically beneficial at the time.

Only once, when Abbas I was visiting Talesh, is it documented that he permitted the open practice of Sunnism. He rejected suggestions to convert the locals to Shia Islam, citing their prior military assistance to his family as justification. Even though some parts of Talesh did eventually convert to Shia Islam, it most likely did not happen until the 19th century.

=== Under Soltan Hoseyn ===
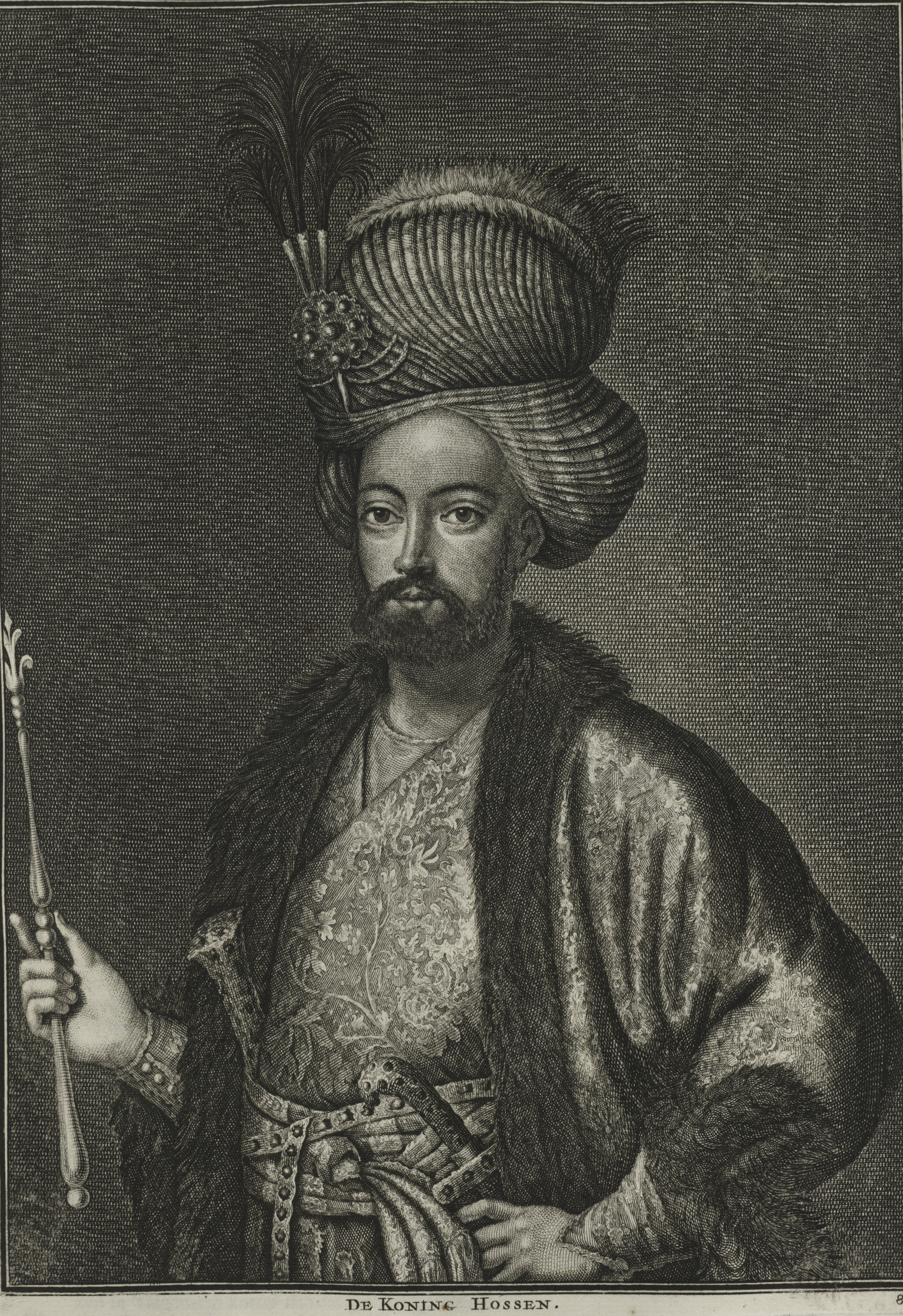
Portrait of Soltan Hoseyn in the Reizen over Moskovie, door Persie en Indie by Cornelis de Bruijn, dated 1703. It is currently located in the Bibliothèque nationale de France in Paris

The religiosity of Soltan Hoseyn (r. 1694–1722) is implied through the numerous awqaf he gifted. He may not have been as intolerant as he commonly is described, as implied by his trust in the Sunni grand vizier Fath-Ali Khan Daghestani, his interest when visiting to the Armenian churches of New Jolfa, as well as the numerous decrees (farman) he declared, which protected the Christian population of Iran and allowed Catholic missionaries to perform their work. Soltan Hoseyn's reign marked an improvement over his father's regarding the status of European missionaries.

The clerics, who held influence over Soltan Hoseyn, were permitted to pursue their dogmatic plans, such as their anti-Sufi policies and taking action against non-Shias. These actions included the forced conversion of Zoroastrians, turning their temple in Isfahan into a mosque, exacting jizya from Jews and Christians, and making it illegal for non-Shias to go outside during rain for fear that they might pollute Shias. In most cases these laws were avoided through bribery, or in other occasions through other means, such as when Maryam Begum interceded on the behalf of the Armenians of New Jolfa.

Nevertheless, the progressively intolerant environment caused by these measures decreased the loyalty of the non-Shias towards the Safavid government. Due to increased taxes and endangerment by a law that permitted the family member of an apostate to gain their belongings, several wealthy Armenians withdrew much of their financial assets and left for the European cities of Venice and Rome. The anti-Sunni policies pursued by the government had the most substantial consequences, as it alienated the many Sunnis of the country, most of whom inhabited its frontiers.

The Shaykh al-Islam Mohammad-Baqer Majlesi had a strong influence over Soltan Hoseyn, who frequently sought his advice, maintained constant communication, and asked him to write religious treatises. The political climate of 18th-century Iran, the intellectual history of Twelver Shia Islam, and the final Shi'itization of the nation were all greatly influenced by Majlesi. In addition to marking the start of a genuinely Iranian expansion within Twelver Shia Islam, Majlesi also foreshadowed the establishment by the Twelver Shia Imams of the Islamic Republic of Iran in the late 20th century.

The Sunni Kurdish revolt in 1704 may have been due to Soltan Hosayn's anti-Sunni policies. The increasing persecution of Sunnites was one of the factors that led to the Afghan rebellion by the Ghilzai leader Mirwais Hotak. A few years prior to the start of the rebellion, Mirwais Hotak was able to obtain a fatwa in Mecca that authorized revolt against Safavid rule as a jihad. When the Afghans invaded Iran, the Shafi'ites of Larestan and other Sunnis somewhat accepted them, probably due to their shared beliefs. Despite the fall of the Safavid government, the Afghans were unable to establish a permanent state, and especially undermine the dominance of Shia Islam in Iran.

Shia Islam continued to thrive in Iran as a distinctive, almost national belief system, even after more than thirty years of limited state backing. However, due in large part to the destruction caused by the Afghans, Isfahan lost its appeal as a major intellectual hub of the Shia world, and instead the shrine cities in Iraq (Najaf, Karbala, Kadhimiya, and Samarra) received more attention.

== The status, practices and reception of the Shia ulama ==
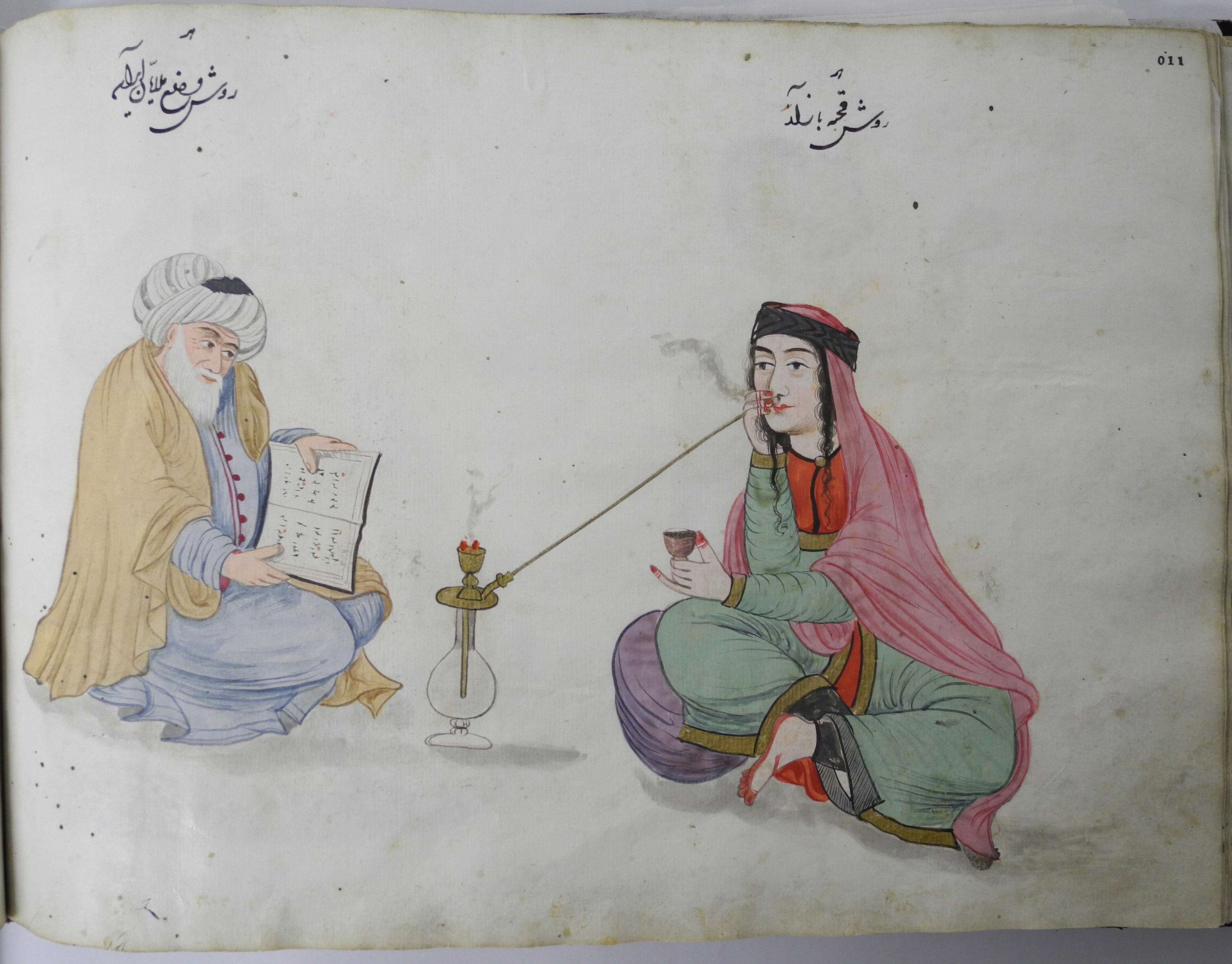
A Persian mullah with a bazaar prostitute, illustration made in Isfahan in 1684/85

Even after two centuries of Persianization, the cultural orientation of the Shia ulama remained largely unchanged. Masquerading with their madrasa (religious school) education, they displayed an anti-intellectual attitude through a strong focus on hadith, conservatism, ritualistic practices in Shia Islam, opposition against diversity, and a heavy emphasis on the stories of the Imams' suffering. It was characteristic of their sociocultural stance that they were hostile to Persian literary and artistic endeavors and treated even ordinary Shia Muslims with disrespect. The Shia ulama were seen with significant uncertainty by the Iranian population. They were scorned for their perceived arrogance, hypocrisy, and greed, yet respected for their intricate knowledge and esteemed position, all of which is prominently depicted in Persian literature. Nevertheless, the Safavid shahs, from Tahmasp I to Soltan Hoseyn, approved of the ulama's conservatism.

The ulama became very wealthy due to the Safavids' vast endowments for religious learning, particularly under Abbas I, but that also made them further subordinate to the state's interests. Sometimes, disagreements emerged over practices such as wine consumption, the support of activities prohibited in Islam like music and painting, and the atypical sexual behaviors within the royal family. Nevertheless, these disagreements were insufficient to cause a significant breach between the monarchy and the ulama.

The ulama opposed other beliefs such as Agnosticism, Sufi orders like the Qalandariyya, mystics, philosophers, Sunni Islam, Judaism, Zoroastrianism, and Christianity. The ulama considered deviation from religious norms to be sinful and unsafe, especially if it resulted in the disregard of superstitious and religious behaviors. Rituals like bodily cleansing, an obsession with impurities, and detailed rules for prayer and fasting were, in the jurists' view, essential to true faith and used to control the public. As the moral police of the state, the ulama controlled education and free time, encouraged faithfulness, and reinforced the gap between the "saved" Shia and the "damned" beliefs.

Even when bolstered by the holy status of the hadith, social control measures were not fully formed until the rise of Majlesi. Judiciaries often and thoroughly criticized music and dancing, whether performed for entertainment or at Sufi gatherings, because they were still popular forms of artistic expression and pastime. They also denounced breaking traditional sexual standards, women stepping outside of the harem, the drinking of wine (which was frequently portrayed in art of the time), and, most all, the overlooking of religious rituals in public.

Even though seminarians and jurists frequently criticized tea and coffee shops, they continued to be much-liked hangouts for poets and artists as well as hubs of artistic innovation. Instead of mosques and stories of Shia hardship, many Muslims instead chose to go to public spaces and coffee shops, so that they could listen to the narration of the Persian epic poem Shahnameh by storytellers. Stories of the adventures of Rostam, such as his fight with the Div-e Sepid on Mount Damavand, as well as the romance about the Sasanian ruler Khosrow II (r. 590–628) and princess Shirin by Nizami Ganjavi, were among the tales they could hear.

=== Immigration of Arab Shia scholars from Jabal Amil ===
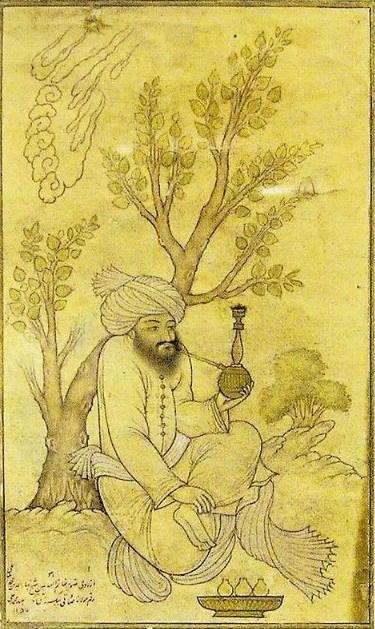
18th-century copy of a Persian miniature depicting Baha al-Din al-Amili, one of the Arab Shia scholars from Jabal Amil

The Arab Shia scholars of Jabal Amil in Southern Lebanon proved to be eager allies and supporters for Ismail I and his advisors. After years of persecution in their own country by the Mamluks and then the Ottomans, they found a benefactor in Ismail I and a place of luxury and esteem in Safavid Iran. The Amilis (and Arab scholars from other regions) were intentionally placed in important religious and quasi-administrative positions by the early Safavid Shahs, so that they could spread their well-defined Islamic creed rooted in the Shia school of thought (madhhab). Popular amongst Shia scholars, the Amilis were supported by the Safavids so that they could provide their rule with legitimacy. The Amilis were strangers to Iran, did not speak Persian, and were unfamiliar with the customs and traditions of their new home. This was in contrast to the native Shia ulama of Iran, or those Sunni jurists and dignitaries who converted to Shia Islam under pressure or to preserve their advantages. Therefore, establishing a network of regional ties separate from the Safavid state proved challenging for them.

The Amilis were also active in the internal Turkmen-Persian tensions that frequently erupted during and after Ismail I's reign. Despite their resistance, the Qizilbash chiefs and Arab ulama could not prevent the indigenous Persian element from gaining prominence. They were ultimately compelled to adhere to the laws of the transforming Safavid state, which was changing from a messianic crusade to a bureaucratic state. An Iranian imperial empire was envisioned when the Safavids began their campaign of conquest and Shia Islam conversion.

During the first half of the 16th century, three prominent Amili scholars of the made significant contributions to the advancement of the Safavid religious hierarchy and clerical leadership. This includes al-Muhaqqiq al-Karaki (died 1533), Husayn ibn Abd al-Samad (died 1576), and Husayn al-Mujtahid (died 1592/93). Among them, al-Muhaqqiq al-Karaki was the most powerful Amili court scholar. As an innovator, he faced challenging duties and, through his successful approval of how different laws were to be interpreted, provoked opposition from Arab and Persian ulama as well as controversy among the elite.

The Amilis, like other state-appointed officials, perceived themselves collectively as guardians of an established orthodoxy. They encouraged people to understand the teachings and beliefs thoroughly and to perform rituals in a structured and organized way. The Amilis constructed new connections and provided relevant explanations for how interpreting the past in Twelver Shia history. A process of Persianization across different social classes and within government structures accompanied the spread of Shia Islam, thus shaping a unique form of Iranian Shia Islam.

Several interconnected elements were prominent in Safavid society by the later 16th century, which was greatly influenced by Twelver Shia Islam. The dynastic and political goals of the shahs had become more clear. Clerical Shia Islam was started to be adopted by the elites who had previously resisted it. In order to gain authority and instill public compliance to clerical decisions across different ethnic and social groups, the Amilis would borrow aspects of Iran's culture. With the Amilis acting as their representatives, the Safavids significantly shaped Iranian legal and doctrinal traditions and altered the political landscape of Iranian society.

=== Shia scholars from Mazandaran, including the Mar'ashis ===
In the 1530s and 1540s, the Safavid household was under heavy influence by the Uskuya sayyids of Tabriz. A new network of sayyids, mostly from Mazandaran, rose to prominence in politics and administration with the capital shift to Qazvin in the 1550s. In recent scholarship, greater attention has been given to the increasing influence of the Mazandarani religious elite within the Safavid state, a subject historically overshadowed by the focus on theologians from Jabal Amil. During the 1550s and 1560s, Safavid Iran was dominated by a large number of Sayyids and theologians from Mazandarani centres such as Astarabad. In addition to producing many works on exegesis, hagiography, and law, they held prominent posts like the sadarat and acted as custodians for shrines. The Mar'ashis from Mazandaran particularly benefited from this development. Since their ancestor Mir-i Buzurg had established his rule in Amol and its environs, they ruled autonomously in the area until their conquest by the Safavids in the early 16th century.

== The reaction of the Sunni ulama ==
The Sunni Ottomans in the west and the Sunni Uzbek tribes in the east were especially angered by the Safavid support of Shia Islam. The Sunni ulama were called upon to answer to the challenge posed by the rise of Twelver Shia Islam. They published polemics, issued fatwas, and exchanged letters with the Shia ulama and rulers. Instead of supporting Shia Islam and the Safavids, many Sunnite scholars in Iran relocated to India, Arabia, the Ottoman Empire, and Central Asia.

== The impact on philosophers ==
The jurists' attacks on philosophers diminished much of their influence. Relegated to the outskirts of the madrasa, philosophy was restricted to tiny and insignificant groups that did not make new ideas. The traditions of the imams, which Majlesi romanticized into a sentimentalized Islam, came to take the lead role instead, thus discouraging creativity. In order to avoid criticism, the School of Isfahan had to be purposefully cryptic, which made it difficult to understand for most followers. Later followers of the philosophy of Mulla Sadra chose to emphasize traditional and pious aspects, neglecting the original and creative parts.

== Celebrations of Nowruz and Ashura ==
Under the Safavids, jointly celebrating Nowruz (Iranian New Year) and Ashura (mourning the death of the third Shia Imam Husayn ibn Ali) gained prominence and built the groundwork for the Iranian-Shia identity that persisted for more than 500 years. Since in 963 in Baghdad under the Buyid ruler Mu'izz al-Dawla (r. 945–967), Ashura had been introduced to the festivities surrounding Nowruz and Mehragan. The creation of several customs ascribed to Shia Imams from the Buyid to the Safavid eras gave Nowruz religious legitimacy. According to historical accounts, the majority of Iranians celebrated Nowruz, even in the face of opposition from Islamic fundamentalists.

== The alleged maternal Iranian origins of the Imams ==
The belief that the Imams were through their mother related to the last Sasanian ruler Yazdegerd III (r. 632–651) became a source of pride for Persian Shias as Shia Islam spread throughout Iran. Whether this assertion was true or not, it became popular over time. Shia tradition claims that Ali al-Sajjad was said to have been proud of being the son of the Persian princess Shahrbanu. By constructing a lineage that connected them to the Imams, the Safavids also emphasized their Persian genealogical heritage through this narrative.

== Historical significance ==
The Reformation in northern and central Europe and the Counter-Reformation that followed it are comparable to the state-sponsored Shia Islam that resulted from the advent of the Safavids and the Sunni response to it. The split that resulted between the Sunnis and Shias is similar to the Protestant-Catholic split that accelerated the formation of nation-states in Europe. The emergence of the Safavid state and its adoption of Shia Islam as the official faith was a pivotal moment that significantly affected both Iran and the surrounding Sunni-majority regions. The conversion to a state-sponsored religion, in this case Shia Islam, provided the bond required to hold together the fundamental elements of Safavid state, similar to other early states such as Spain and England. Iran was largely shaped into a geographical empire with a unique identity due to the fusion of religious and political elements by the Safavid dynasty.

== Sources ==
- Abisaab, Rula Jurdi (2004). Converting Persia: Religion and Power in the Safavid Empire. I.B.Tauris. ISBN 978-1860649707.
- Algar, Hamid (2006). "Iran ix. Religions in Iran (2) Islam in Iran (2.3) Shiʿism in Iran Since the Safavids". In Yarshater, Ehsan (ed.). Encyclopædia Iranica. Vol. XIII/5: Iran X. Religions in Iran–Iraq V. Safavid period. London and New York: Routledge & Kegan Paul. pp. 456–474. ISBN 978-0-933273-93-1.
- Amanat, Abbas (1997). Pivot of the Universe: Nasir Al-Din Shah Qajar and the Iranian Monarchy, 1831–1896. I.B. Tauris. ISBN 978-1845118280.
- Amanat, Abbas (2017). Iran: A Modern History. Yale University Press. ISBN 978-0300112542.
- Amoretti, B. S. (1986). "Religion in the Timurid and Safavid periods". In Lockhart, Laurence; Jackson, Peter (eds.). The Cambridge History of Iran: The Timurid and Safavid Periods. Vol. 6. Cambridge: Cambridge University Press. pp. 610–655. ISBN 0-521-20094-6.
- Ashraf, Ahmad; Gnoli, Gherardo (2020). "Iranian Identity". Brill. doi:10.1163/2330-4804_EIRO_COM_11030.
- Brunner, R. (2020). "Moḥammad-Bāqer Majlesi". Brill. doi:10.1163/2330-4804_EIRO_COM_10783.
- Ghereghlou, Kioumars (2020). "Esmāʿil II". Brill. doi:10.1163/2330-4804_EIRO_COM_11881.
- Maryam, Moazzen (2017). Formation of a Religious Landscape: Shi'i Higher Learning in Safavid Iran. Brill. ISBN 978-9004355293.
- Matthee, Rudi (2011). Persia in Crisis: Safavid Decline and the Fall of Isfahan. I.B.Tauris. ISBN 978-0857731814.
- Matthee, Rudi (2020a). "Safavid dynasty". Brill. doi:10.1163/2330-4804_EIRO_COM_509.
- Matthee, Rudi (2020b). "Solṭān Ḥosayn". Encyclopaedia Iranica Online. Brill. doi:10.1163/2330-4804_EIRO_COM_11706.
- Mitchell, Colin P. (2009). The Practice of Politics in Safavid Iran: Power, Religion and Rhetoric. I.B.Tauris. ISBN 978-0857715883.
- Mitchell, Colin P. (2020). "Ṭahmāsp I". Brill. doi:10.1163/2330-4804_EIRO_COM_878.
- Newman, Andrew J. (2008). Safavid Iran: Rebirth of a Persian Empire. I.B.Tauris. ISBN 978-0857716613.
- Newman, Andrew J. (2013). Twelver Shiism: Unity and Diversity in the Life of Islam, 632 to 1722. Edinburgh University Press. ISBN 978-0748633302.
- Savory, Roger M. (2007). Iran Under the Safavids. Cambridge University Press. ISBN 9780521042512.
