= Jafar Kashfi =

Jafar Kashfi may refer to:

- Ja'far Kashfi, Persian philosopher of 19th century
- Seyyed Jafar Kashfi, Iranian calligrapher
