= Iranian Mental Health Research Network =

Iranian research center network

- شبكه تحقيقات سلامت روان ايران
- Type: Public
- Established: May 2006
- President: Mohammadreza Mohammadi
- Location: Tehran, Tehran, Iran
- Website: mhrn.net

Iranian Mental Health Research Network (MHRN) (Persian: شبكه تحقيقات سلامت روان) is a network of related research centers founded in 2006 in Iran. The network is supervised by the Iranian Deputy of Research and Technology of the Ministry of Health. Currently it includes 23 centers active in the field of mental health research. Director of the Iranian MHRN is Mohammadreza Mohammadi. His first director was Jafar Bolhari, a psychiatrist and the former director of Tehran Institute of Psychiatry.
