= Sheikh Bahaei University =

- دانشگاه شیخ بهایی
- Type: Private
- Established: 1994; 32 years ago
- President: Jafar Zafarani
- Faculty: 78
- Location: Baharestan, Isfahan, IRAN
- Campus: Urban
- Website: www.shbu.ac.ir

Sheikh Bahaei University (SHBU) (Persian: دانشگاه شیخ بهایی), was established by virtue of the 1994 law of non-governmental and non-profitable universities and institutions through the efforts of ten professors from the University of Isfahan.

== Notable founders ==
- Dr. Jafar Zafarani

== See also ==
- Baha' ad-Din al-`Amili, after whom the University was named
- Higher education in Iran
- Science in Iran
