= Jame-e Abbasi =

17th-century Persian encyclopedia on Islamic jurisprudence

Jame-e Abbasi (Persian: جامع عباسی) is a 17th-century Persian encyclopedia on feqh (Islamic jurisprudence) in Shia Islam, composed by Baha al-Din al-Amili under the orders of the Safavid ruler Shah Abbas I (r. 1587–1629).

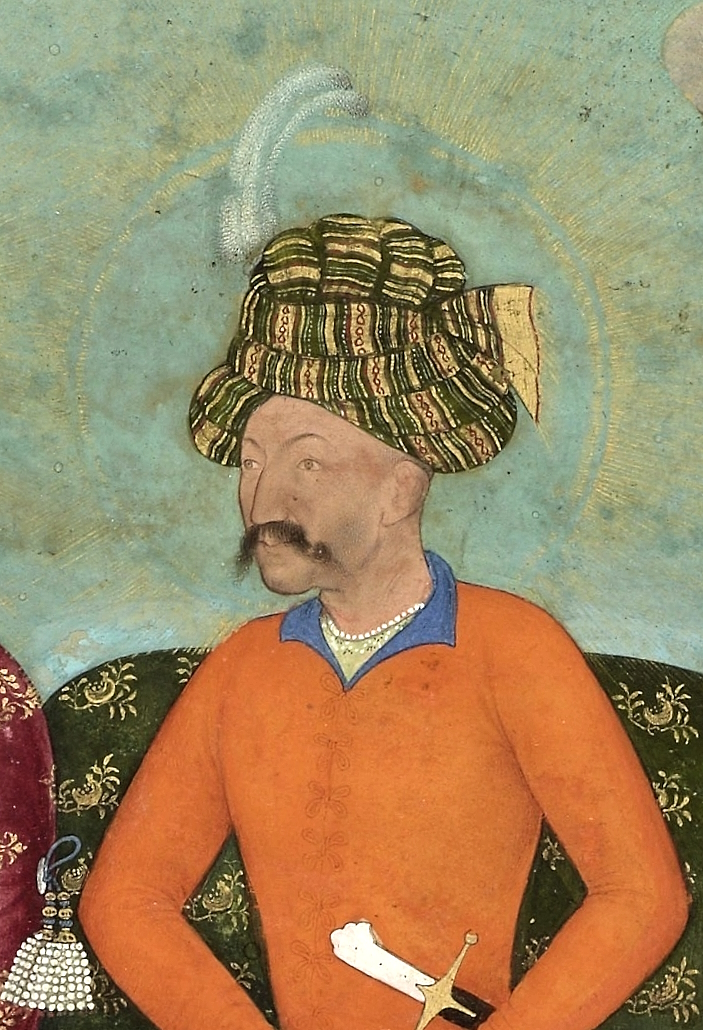
Shah Abbas I

During the reign of Shah Ismail I and Shah Tahmasp I, there was minimal interest in collections of Shia tradition, with the exception of the writings of Husayn ibn Abd al-Samad. There was a greater push to expand and preserve Shia tradition under Shah Abbas I. Shia tradition was the subject of writings by authors such as Baha al-Din al-Amili, Mir Damad, and Sayyed Ahmad Alavi. The juridical encyclopedia that was most widely used was Jame-e Abbasi. It covered topics such as Islamic customs, the correct birth and death dates of the Imams, monetary donations, sales, marriage, divorce, vows, atonement, and criminal law. Abbas I instructed that Jame-e Abbasi be delivered in "a clear, comprehensible language in order that all people, the learned and the lay, would seek benefit from it," in a deliberate attempt to provide an example of Persianized Shia Islam to the Iranians.

The works that Abbas I commissioned catered to a broad audience, in contrast to the expert texts written by the ulama (Islamic clergy). Jame-e Abbasi marked a turning point in the spread of Shia legal literature by promoting unification throughout the realm.

The work was translated into Georgian by Parsadan Gorgijanidze (1626–c. 1696).

== Sources ==
- Abisaab, Rula Jurdi (2004). Converting Persia: Religion and Power in the Safavid Empire. I.B.Tauris. ISBN 978-1860649707.
- Giunashvili, Jemshid (2016). "GORGIJANIDZE, PARSADAN". In Yarshater, Ehsan (ed.). Encyclopædia Iranica (Online ed.). Encyclopædia Iranica Foundation.
- Rizvi, Sajjad (2020). "Jāmeʿ-e ʿabbāsi". Encyclopaedia Iranica Online. Brill. doi:10.1163/2330-4804_EIRO_COM_3890.
