= Jifar (name) =

Jifar (Amharic: ጅፋር) or Jufar is a male name of Ethiopian origin that may refer to:

- Tesfaye Jifar (born 1976), Ethiopian long-distance runner
- Habte Jifar (born 1976), Ethiopian middle-distance runner
- Tariku Jufar (born 1984), Ethiopian marathon runner
- Abba Jifar I (fl. 1800s), first king of the Gibe Kingdom of Jimma (1830–1855)
- Abba Jifar II (died 1932), King of the Gibe Kingdom of Jimma (1878–1932)

== See also ==
- Ja'far
