= Jaafar Abdul Karim =

German television presenter

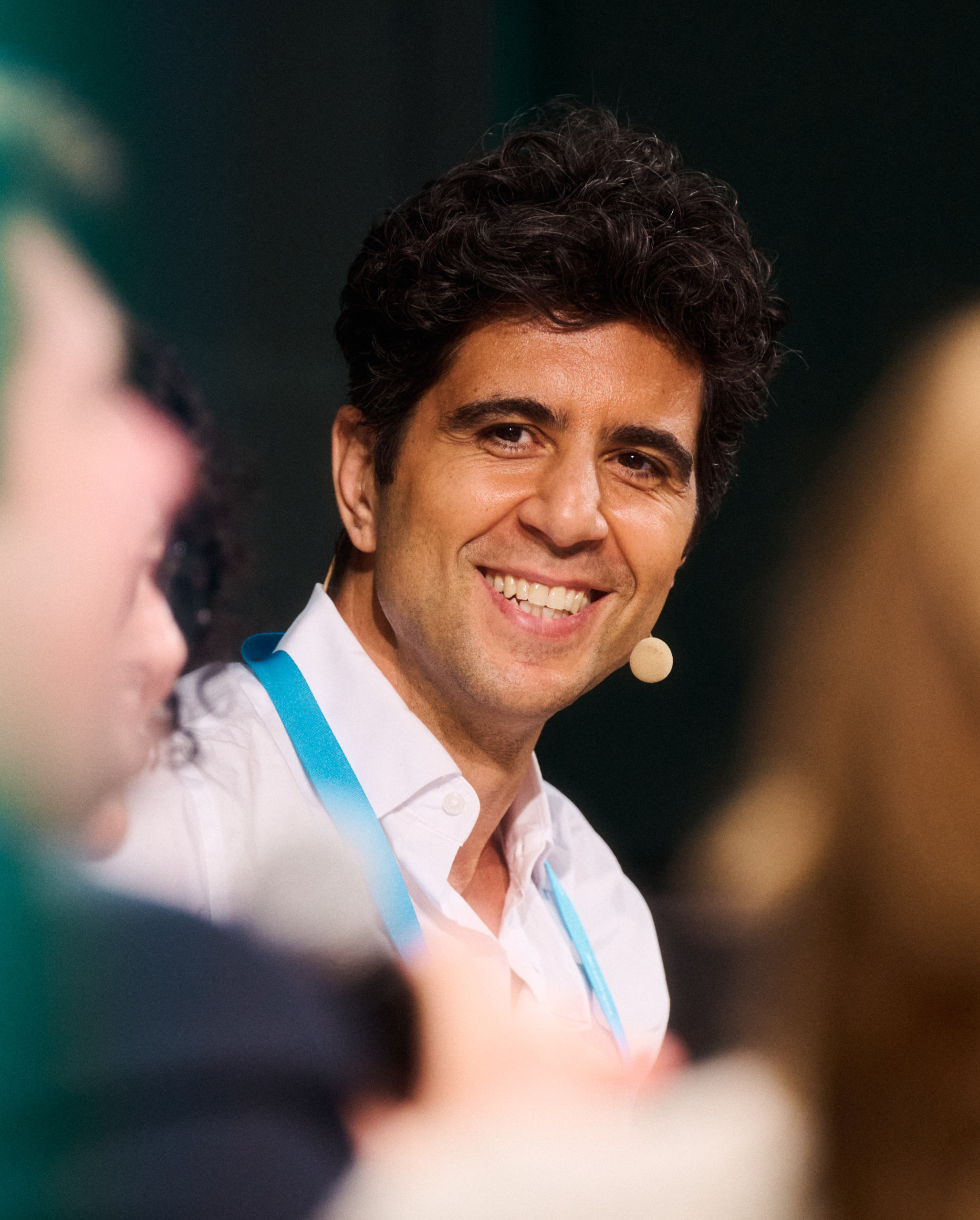
- Jaafar Abdul Karim in 2026
- Born: 1981 (age 44–45); Monrovia
- Occupations: Television presenter & Journalist
- Employer: Deutsche Welle Arabia

Jaafar Abdul Karim (Arabic: جعفر عبد الكريم; born 1981) is a German journalist and TV presenter. He currently resides in Berlin and works for Deutsche Welle Arabia as the host of Jaafar Talk.

== Early life and education ==
Abdul Karim is an Arab-German journalist who was born in Monrovia and grew up in Lebanon and Switzerland, he moved to Germany in 2001. He studied media informatics at the TU Dresden and at the Institut National des Sciences Appliquées in Lyon and completed a directing course at the London Film Academy.

== Journalism ==
=== Early career (pre-2011) ===
Abdul Karim worked as an editor and video journalist for the talk show Jugend ohne Grenzen at Deutsche Welle, for which he commuted between Cairo and Berlin and produced current reports for the show at both locations. He has also studied in an M.A. program in Communication and Leadership at the Quadriga University of Applied Sciences in Berlin.

=== Shabab Talk and mid-career (2011-2019) ===
He became presenter of the talk show Shabab Talk for Deutsche Welle Arabia in 2011. The show reaches over 8.5 million viewers worldwide and by some accounts hundreds of millions of views overall on social media.

His international reporting includes coverage of the events and consequences of the Arab Spring, especially in Egypt, Tunisia, and Libya.

In 2013, he released After the storm, a film which won best documentary at the Aljazeera International Documentary Film Festival and UNSPOKEN Human Rights Film Festival in New York.

In 2014, he served as a panelist at the International Journalism Festival in Perugia, Italy in a session on the significance of online comments sections.

Starting in September 2015, Abdul Karim expanded his media activities to include additional online projects, including a trilingual column for Zeit Online (Jaafar, shu fi?) and, since October 2015, Jaafar's video blog at Spiegel Online.

On October 19, 2015, Abdul Karim traveled to Dresden to report on public demonstrations of Pegida, an openly Islamophobic movement. While attempting to gather protesters' opinions, Abdul Karim was yelled at and then hit in the neck; the police have not been able to identify the perpetrator.

Since June 2016, Abdul Karim has moderated the culture magazine Stilbruch (RBB), for which he was featured in the report Refugee and Arrived in September 2016, covering lives of Syrian refugees who work as artists in Berlin.

In December 2016, he appeared in the two-part documentary How sexist we are? with Dunja Hayali. It was produced during the aftermath of a slew of sexual assaults that took place on New Year's Eve 2016 in Cologne.

On 14 October 2016, Abdul Karim moderated the expert discussion of the then Federal President Joachim Gauck on the subject of integration and prevention of radicalization.

After broadcasting a program on the situation of women in Sudan—in which a 28-year-old woman loudly criticized the oppression and harassment of women in North Africa—in September 2018, Jaafar was threatened with hate messages, calls for boycott, and open threats of violence.

=== Jaafar Talk (2019-present) ===
He contributed to the News Impact Summit in Munich in March 2019, on the theme "Identity & Inclusion: Local News with Diverse Voices."

In 2019, Abdul Karim began serving as host of a talk show called Jaafar Talk.

== Critical reception and impact ==
Against a backdrop of underrepresentation of migrant voices in German journalism, Abdul Karim has gained a large following and furthermore addresses topics of social concern for migrant, Arab, and Muslim communities. His reporting is characterized by a lack of fear about addressing topics in Arabic that are largely considered taboo in Middle Eastern communities, such as LGBTQ rights, sex and sexuality.

He has been described as a mediator between refugees and wider political society. He is a frequent guest on talk shows and magazines on topics related to the Arab world (including Günther Jauch, Phoenix Runde, Volle Kanne and Stern TV ).

== Awards ==
- 2012: Top-10 placement in the journalist of the year election by Medium
- 2016: Journalist of the year in the "Reporter" category, Medium
- 2026:

== Publications ==
- Strangers or friends? What the young Arab community thinks, feels and moves Rowohlt, Reinbek near Hamburg 2018, ISBN 978-3-499-63390-4 .
