= Azmun Jaafar =

Indonesian civil servant and politician (1958–2025)

Tengku Azmun Jaafar
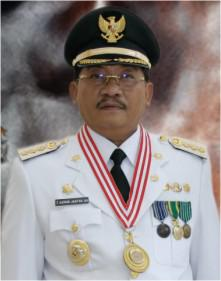
- Jaafar in 2008

Regent of Pelalawan
- In office 31 March 2001 – 19 June 2008
- Preceded by: office established
- Succeeded by: Rustam Effendi

Personal details
- Born: 18 November 1958 Pelalawan, Riau, Indonesia
- Died: 9 May 2025 (aged 66) Pekanbaru, Riau, Indonesia
- Spouse: Dian Dahliar
- Children: 3
- Education: Islamic University of Indonesia (S.H.)

Tengku Azmun Jaafar (18 November 1958 – 9 May 2025) was an Indonesian civil servant and politician. He was the first regent of Pelalawan from its formation in 2001 until his resignation amid a corruption case in 2008.

== Early life and education ==
Azmun Jaafar was born on 18 November 1958 in Pelalawan, Riau, as the youngest of six siblings. His upbringing was shaped by a nurturing yet disciplined family environment. His father, Said Jaafar M, was a respected community leader who served in a number of important regional offices in Pelalawan and Riau. Azmun's early exposure to his father's public service instilled in him a strong sense of leadership and civic responsibility. He often accompanied his father on official visits, gaining valuable insights into governance and community engagement.

Azmun began his education at an elementary school in Air Tiris in 1971, followed by junior and senior high school in Bangkinang in 1974 and 1977, respectively. He aspired to become a physician, inspired by the absence of medical professionals in his family. However, after not gaining admission to medical school, he pursued a degree in law at the Islamic University of Indonesia in Yogyakarta in 1978. This decision was influenced by his family's background in government and his desire to contribute meaningfully to his region and country. Azmun's academic pursuits were complemented by active participation in student organizations, which further honed his leadership skills.

During his tenure as a civil servant, he attended a number of courses held by the Department of Home Affairs, including an advanced administrative course and a public relations course in 1992, an advance governance course in 1994, government management training in 2000, and a special short course at the National Resilience Institute in 2001.

== Career ==
Azmun Jaafar's professional career began when he joined the civil service as chief of Data and Counseling at the Civil Registry Office in Bengkalis Regency. He was appointed for the position on 21 June 1988. His progression through the ranks was marked by a series of increasingly responsible positions, including chief of public relations on 19 March 1992 and chief of legal affairs on 9 March 1995 at the Bengkalis regional secretariat. Around this period, he also taught as a lecturer at the Bengkalis Islamic Institute and the Bengkalis branch of the Lancang Kuning University.

Shortly before the fall of Suharto, on 5 January 1998 Azmun became the assistant for administrative affairs to the Bengkalis regional secretary, the most senior civil service position in the regency. On 18 July 1998, he briefly assumed office as the chief of the socio-political office of Bengkalis in an acting capacity. He was then appointed as the chief of the Bengkalis electoral committee secretariat on 7 April 1999, responsible for the 1999 Indonesian legislative election in the region.

On 12 October 1999, the Pelalawan Regency was established as a breakaway from the Kampar Regency. Less than a year later, on 10 January 2000 Azmun became the chief of the development planning agency of Pelalawan.

In addition to his administrative roles, Azmun was actively involved in youth and professional organizations. He was a member of the Pramuka (Indonesian Scout Movement) in Bangkinang and joined the Indonesian Civil Servants Corps in Bengkalis in 1986. He also became the Secretary of the Indonesian National Youth Committee (KNPI) in Bengkalis from 1987 to 1990 and the organization's chairman from 1990 to 1996.

== Regent of Pelalawan and corruption case ==
=== Tenure ===
Azmun Jaafar became the first permanent regent of Pelalawan on 31 March 2001 after being elected by the regency's parliament. During his first term, Azmun prioritized the welfare of marginalized communities and sought to eradicate poverty in Pelalawan. He introduced five flagship programs to drive regional development, by developing the people's economy, forestry, education, health, and regional autonomy. In regards to the latter. Azmun advocated for greater regional autonomy, urging the central government to align its policies with local needs and to grant regions the freedom to manage their own affairs.

Azmun was reelected as the regent of Pelalawan for a second term in February 2006, assuming office the next month. During his second term, Azmun's political role was distinctly prominent. He enjoyed considerable support from the community, distinguished by a charismatic leadership style that was rooted in public desire for progress. He also maintained a generally harmonious relationship with the local parliament, which was crucial for the smooth passage of regional policies and budgetary decisions. The partnership between the Azmun-led executive and legislative branch in Pelalawan was based more on coordination and collaboration than hierarchy, thus fostering effective governance while allowing for healthy debate and exchange of perspectives.

Under Azmun's leadership, policy formulation was characterized by a proactive effort to gather, absorb, and translate community input into concrete policies and development programs. Azmun's vision for Pelalawan, which emphasized economic empowerment supported by robust agriculture and industry within a culturally distinguished society, reflected ambitious targets for regional progress. This vision helped to lay a foundational roadmap for Pelalawan's future, and his administration was recognized for sparking rapid changes and significant progress in the wake of the region's separation from Kampar Regency.

Azmun's organizational approach had some weaknesses, especially regarding the internal structuring of the administration. While he valued loyalty and work ethics in appointing senior officials, technical competence was not always prioritized. This occasionally led to less systematic delegation of tasks and ambiguities in roles within the bureaucracy.

=== Corruption case ===
Several months later, on 14 December 2007, the Corruption Eradication Commission (KPK, Komisi Pemberantasan Korupsi) arrested Azmun on suspicion of corruption related to the issuance of 15 Forest Timber Product Utilization Permits for Plantation Forests between 2001 and 2006. Of these 15 companies, seven were directly affiliated with Azmun, having been established by his relatives and subordinates. Notably, none of the companies met the qualifications required by the Ministry of Forestry.

The investigation revealed that these companies were deliberately formed to obtain permits, which were subsequently transferred to other entities, including Riau Andalan Pulp & Paper (RAPP). Azmun personally benefited from these transfers, receiving substantial sums of money. Furthermore, the forest areas granted under these permits were not vacant lands, as required, but rather natural forests with significant timber potential—exceeding five cubic meters per hectare. The state suffered estimated losses of 1.208 trillion rupiahs, while Azmun was alleged to have received at least 9.56 billion rupiahs.

In the initial trial at the Corruption Court on 9 May 2008, the public prosecutor charged Azmun with enriching himself by 19.83 billion rupiahs. The primary charge alleged unlawful self-enrichment to the detriment of the state, while the subsidiary charge focused on abuse of power for personal or corporate gain. The prosecution sought a 12-year prison sentence and a fine of Rp 500 million, with an additional order for Azmun to pay Rp 19.83 billion in restitution. On 16 September 2008, the court found Azmun guilty of corruption, sentencing him to 11.5 years in prison, a 500 million rupiahs fine, and ordering him to pay 12.3 billion rupiahs in restitution.

Azmun then appealed to the Jakarta High Court. On 6 January 2009, the appellate court overturned the lower court's decision on the primary charge but found Azmun guilty under the subsidiary charge of collective and continuous corruption. The sentence was increased to 16 years in prison, with the same fine and an order for the confiscation of assets from the 15 implicated companies, amounting to 1.208 trillion rupiahs. On 27 April 2009, Azmun was officially discharged from his position as regent after being suspended on 19 June 2008.

== Personal life and death ==
Azmun Jaafar was married to Dian Dahliar and had three children.

Azmun died at the Awal Bros Sudirman Hospital in Pekanbaru, on 9 May 2025, at the age of 66. His body was brought to his residence at Pekanbaru before being interred the next day.
