= Mir Jafar Dasni =

Rebel of Caliph al-Mu'tasim era

- Died: c. 841; Abbasid Caliphate
- Cause of death: Suicide (In order to avoid being captured alive, He committed suicide by drinking poison)
- Other names: Mir Jafar bin Mir Hasan Dasni; Jafar bin Faharjis
- Criminal charges: Rebellion against State (Treason)
- Penalty: None (died by drinking Poison)

Details
- Victims: unknown
- Date: c. 838 – 841
- Killed: unknown

Mir Jafar bin Mir Hasan Dasni (Kurdish: Mîr Ceferê Dasnî), also known as Jafar bin Faharjis, was a Kurdish-Yazidi leader who in 838 launched an uprising against Abbasid Caliph al-Mutasim in the area north of Mosul.

After being defeated at Babagesh he resided in castles in Dasin. Al-Mu'tasim in response sent an army under command of Abdullah bin Ans al-Azdi, resulting in an armed confrontation between the Arab army and Kurds. Due to the difficulty of the terrain, the Arab army proved unsuccessful, suffered heavy casualties and a number of its commanders including Abdullah's uncle Ishaq bin Ans and his father-in-law were killed. Al-Mu'tasim had purchased a Khazar slave, called Itakh. He appointed him as commander of his army. Itakh defeated Mir Jafar's troops in 841 and killed many Kurds. In order to avoid being captured alive, Mir Jafar committed suicide by drinking poison.

== See also ==
- Mir Jafar, military commander who betrayed the Nawab of Bengal
