= Cafer Osman Topçı =

Soviet Crimean Tatar military officer

- Born: 10 October 1921; Bakhchisarai, Government of South Russia (now Crimea)
- Died: 16 October 1944 (aged 23); Dévaványa, Kingdom of Hungary
- Military career
- Allegiance: Soviet Union
- Branch: Red Army
- Rank: Major
- Conflicts: World War II
- Awards: Order of the Red Banner; Order of Alexander Nevsky

Cafer Osman Topçı (Russian: Джафер Осман Топчи, romanized: Dzhafer Osman Topchi, Crimean Tatar: Джафер Осман Топчы; 10 October 1921 – 16 October 1944) was a Crimean Tatar officer in the Red Army during World War II. Wounded six times, he distinguished himself in combat many times and was nominated for the title Hero of the Soviet Union on two separate occasions for it, but never received it.

== Early life ==
Topçı was born to a Crimea Tatar family in Bakhchisarai, Crimea in 1921. A member of the Komsomol since 1937, and he subsequently admitted to the Communist Party in 1942. Having been drafted into the Red Army in March 1940, he served in military for the remainder of his life.

== World War II ==
Having been fighting on the frontlines against the German invasion of the Soviet Union since the first day of the war, he saw action on the Southwestern, Stalingrad, Don, 3rd Ukrainian, and 2nd Ukrainian fronts. Wounded in action for the first time on 3 September 1941, he soon returned to combat, and went on to join the 610th Rifle Regiment upon its formation in March 1942. There he quickly rose up through the ranks, becoming commander of a platoon of machine gunners, and by 1943 he held the rank of captain and was in command of a battalion within the regiment. On the night of 13–14 May 1944 he led an offensive charge that resulted in the capture of two lines of trenches and elimination of the German bridgehead on that part of the Dniester river in the Dorotskoye area. Later from 14 to 21 May they faced a barrage of German counterattacks that left them encircled, but Topçı refused to retreat despite being cut off from supply reinforcements, and went on to lead his battalion in repulsing the multiple daily attacks. They then broke through the encirclement on the night of 20–21 May, taking out four anti-tank guns, two armored personnel carriers, six vehicles and an estimated 60 enemy soldiers in the process. Before the battle went down, he carefully instructed his subordinates on ways to move quickly in difficult terrain and select idea firing position, to the admiration of his regiment commander. For his skillful leadership and ingenuity in the battle he was nominated for the title Hero of the Soviet Union for the first time; the nomination sheet also noted that he voluntarily chose to continue fighting despite having been injured on six separate occasions resulting in wounds that would allow him to be exempt from further military service. Nevertheless, he went on to continue to distinguish himself in combat, leading a successful attack on retreating enemy forces in Hungary that resulted in the deaths of an estimated 200 Axis soldiers, capture of ten Hungarian officers, as well as the seizure of a large quantity of enemy military equipment, consisting of approximately 400 rifles, 36 mortars, 280 horses, six cars, three motorcycles, among other equipment.

On the outskirts of the Tisza river he fought in his last battle, during which he led the interception of an enemy column, resulting in the capture of over 200 enemy soldiers and officers in addition to their equipment. In the battle, the units from his regiment involved briefly became surrounded, but as usual, Topçı refused to retreat, fighting to the death until reinforcements arrived. As a result of the battle, he was mortally wounded, and died on 16 October 1944. He was subsequently nominated for the title Hero of the Soviet Union on 15 November 1944; however, the posthumous nomination was rejected and downgraded to an Order of the Patriotic War 1st class. Earlier in 1944 before he was killed in action, he had heard about the deportation of his family from Crimea because they were Crimean Tatar via a letter, and wrote back saying that he thought clearly a monstrous mistake had been made and expressed hopes of them all being able to return soon. However, that was not the case for them, since after he was killed in action, his family remained exiled and in Uzbekistan, and did not receive a notice of his death until 1947.

== Awards ==
- Order of the Red Banner (23 July 1944)
- Order of Alexander Nevsky (4 November 1944)
- Order of the Patriotic War 1st class (31 December 1944)
- Order of the Patriotic War 2nd class (24 September 1943)
- Medal "For Courage" (28 September 1942 and 30 December 1942)
