= Jafar Zafarani =

Iranian mathematician

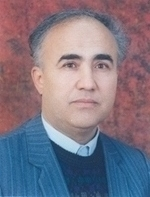
- (Jafar Zafarani, 2004)
- Born: 1947 (age 78–79); Isfahan
- Citizenship: Iranian
- Education: University of Tehran, University of Liège
- Scientific career
- Fields: Mathematician
- Workplaces: University of Isfahan
- Doctoral advisor: Prof. G. H. Garnir and Prof. J.Schmets

Jafar Zafarani (Persian: جعفر زعفرانی) is an Iranian mathematician. A professor at the University of Isfahan and chancellor at Sheikhbahaee University, Zafarani's research interests include functional analysis and nonlinear functional analysis. Zafarani obtained his BSc in Mathematics at the University of Tehran in 1969 and completed his D.Sc. at the University of Liège, Belgium in 1974. He served as president of the Iranian Mathematical Society from 1989 to 1991.

== Professional Experience ==
Associate editor of the Journal of Sciences, Islamic Republic of Iran.
Associate editor of the Journal of Optimization, Theory and Applications.
Associate editor of the Journal of Nonlinear and Variational Analysis.
President at Sheikhbahaee University

== See also ==
- Science in Iran
