= Jafar Ebrahimi =

Iranian poet

Jafar Ebrahimi (Persian: جعفرابراهیمی) is an Iranian poet, born in Ardabil and living in Tehran. His pen name is Shahed. He is a children's and teen's author and poet, and has written 50 works including novels, poetry, and story collections.
