= Jafar Bolhari =

Iranian academic

- Born: August 6, 1948; Iran
- Education: Iran University of Medical Sciences (M.D.)
- Occupation: Professor of Psychiatry
- Employer: Iran University of Medical Sciences

Jafar Bolhari (born August 6, 1948) is an Iranian psychiatrist and researcher. He is a professor of psychiatry at the Spiritual Health Research Center, Iran University of Medical Sciences, and he worked for 25 years as the director of Tehran Institute of Psychiatry: School of Behavioral Sciences and Mental Health خانه since 1992.

Bolhari has also been the director of the Iranian Mental Health Research Network since its formation in 2006. His major areas of interest are community mental health services, spiritual and religious therapy, and drug abuse prevention programs.

He is one of the founders of the Program of Integration of Mental Health Care in the Primary Health Care System in Iran.

Bolhari is the author of several English articles and Persian-language books for health care providers with different educational levels: Mental Health for Health Workers; A Guide to Implementation of OSCE in Iran; Effective Communication and mental health care; Spiritual and Religious skills/Therapy; Spirituality in clinic and for University Students.
