= Naceur Ben Jaâfar =

Tunisian politician and activist

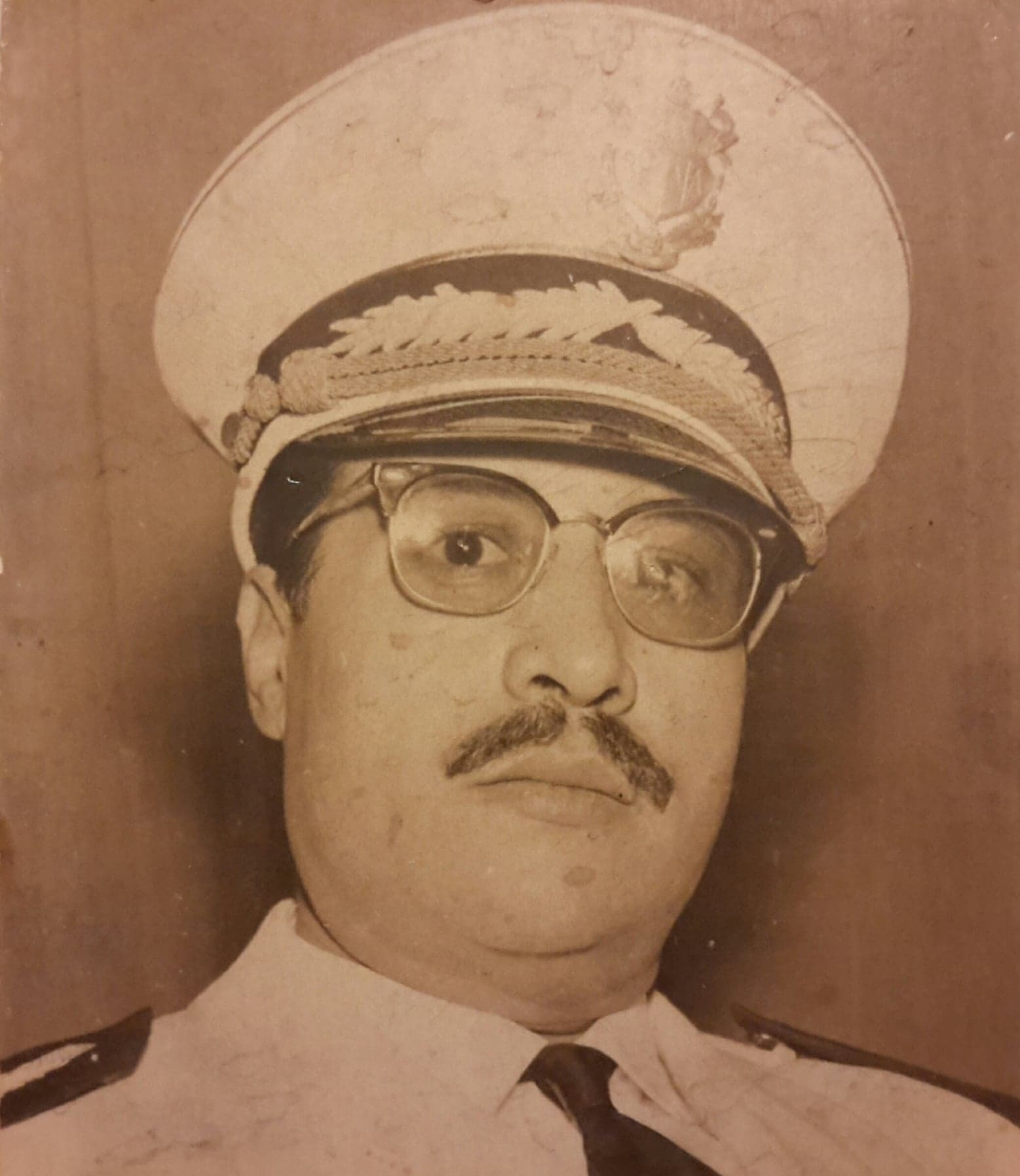
Naceur Ben Jaâfar in Official Governor's Uniform - 1956-1960 - Souk-el-Arba

Naceur Ben Jaâfar (full name, Naceur Ben Mohamed Ali Ben Rachid Ben Jaâfar) (June 15, 1923 – September 22, 1970) was a Tunisian politician and labour activist.

== Pre-independence political and trade union activism ==
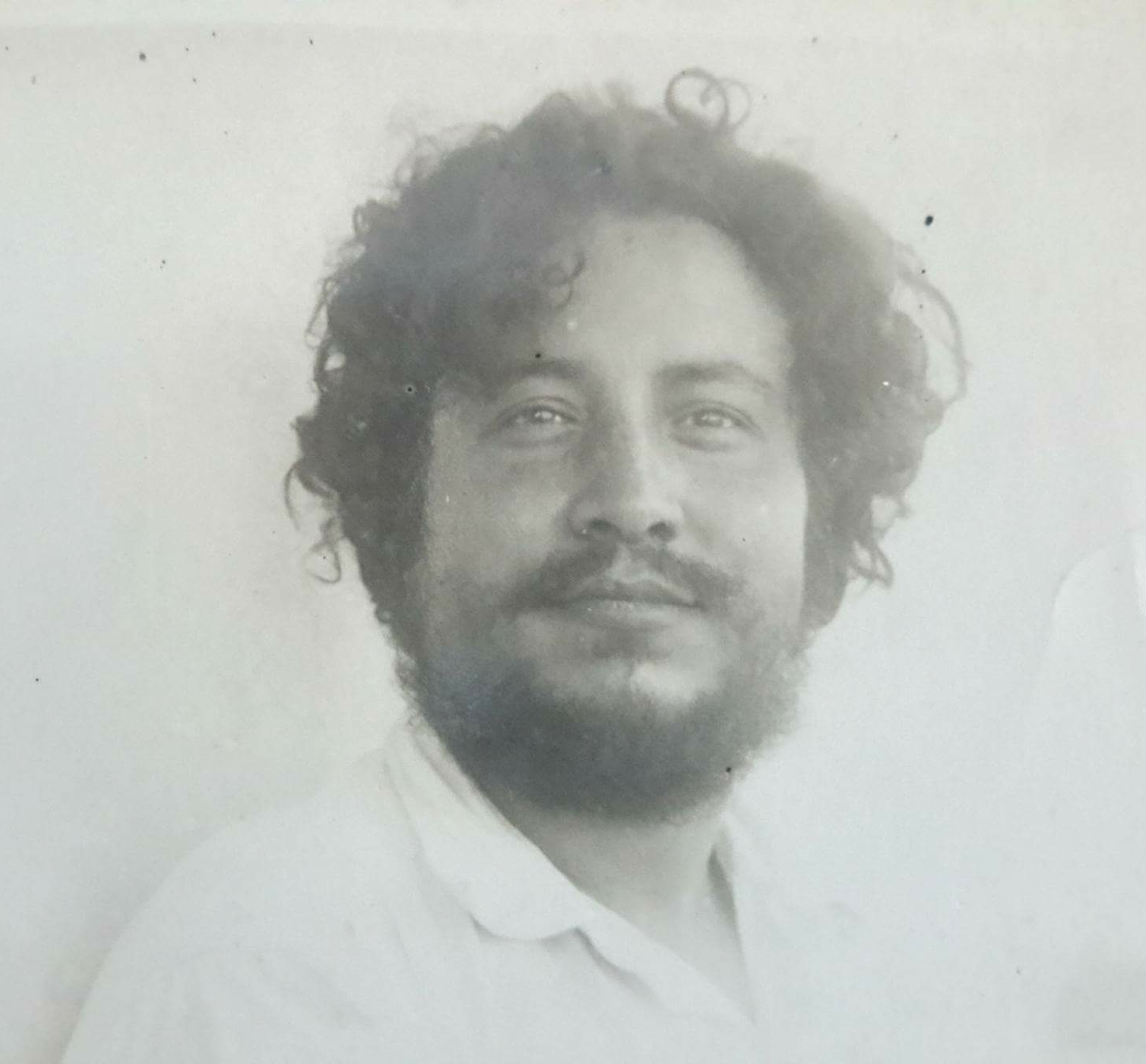
Naceur Ben Jaâfar, Political Prisoner Number 266, Teboursouk Military Prison, June, 10th 1952

After primary education in the Franco-Arab Koranic school of Al Irfania, he started his secondary education at Collège Sadiki, from which he was expelled because of his political activities, when, in 1938, he joined the Neo-Destour cell in Halfaouine (a popular district in Tunis). That was before he became in 1951 a member of the Neo-Destour Federation, for Tunis and its suburbs. He was also elected member of the Neo-Destour National Council, during the party 5th Congress, held in Sfax, in November 1955.

He was equally a trade-union activist within the Tunisian General Labour Union (UGTT), since its inception in 1946, he was a member-elect of the Executive Bureau of the labour regional union for the Tunis constituency, from 1947 to 1949, during its 3rd Congress, held in Tunis in April 1949.

Naceur Ben Jaâfar, political prisoner Nb. 266 at the Teboursouk military prison, on June 10, 1952.

He was also active in the press. He was on the editorial boards of various newspapers, notably Arraquib (a weekly newspaper in Arabic), Mission (the Neo-Destour weekly in French, issued from 1948 to 1952), (weekly in Arabic issued as of 1953) and the daily paper Assabah.

Naceur Ben Jaâfar was arrested and detained several times, between 1952 and 1954, for, among other accusations, fomenting struggle against the colonisers, writing and disseminating tracts denouncing colonisation. He was thus imprisoned in the Jalal camp in Ben Gardane (January–September 1952), the Tataouine military prison (May–September 1953), and the Bordj le Boeuf camp (June–September 1954). He was then appointed by the Neo-Destour as a member of the Committee of the Tunisian Government representatives in charge of contacts with the fellagas all over Tunisia, in order to convince them to relinquish their weapons, with the militant Houcine Bouzaiane,

== Post-independence political career ==
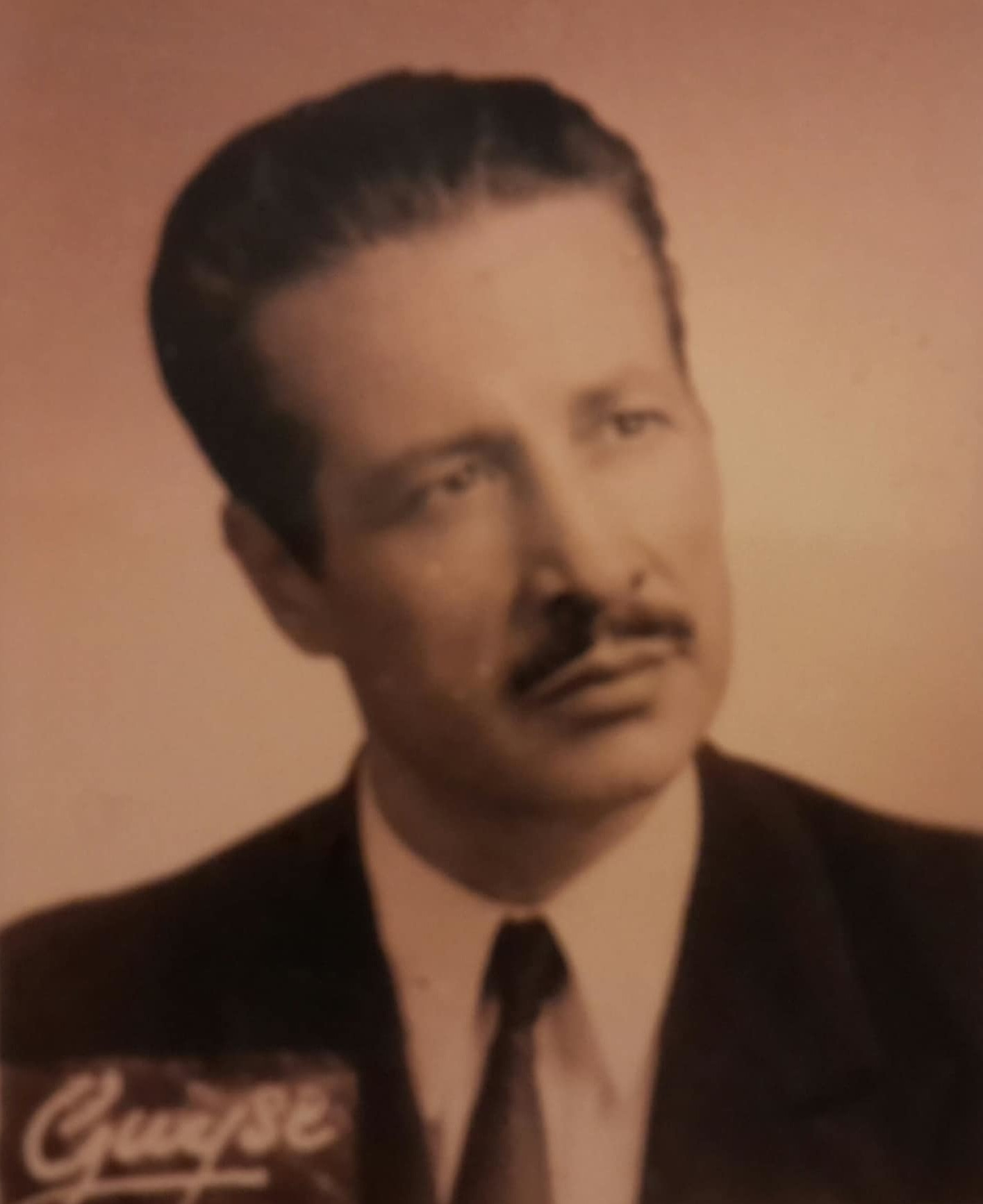
Naceur Ben Jaâfar, Member of the National Assembly 1969

Naceur Ben Jaâfar was elected as a member of the National Assembly in 1969.

After the independence of Tunisia on March 20, 1956, he was elected as a member of the first Constituent Assembly, at the head of the National Front ballot list (coalition between the Neo-Destour, the Tunisian General Labour Union UGTT, the Tunisian Union for Agriculture and Fishing UTAP and the Tunisian Union for Industry, Commerce and Handicraft UTICA) for the Matmata, Tataouine Ouerghemma, Nefzaoua and Medenine constituency.

He held his MP seat for a short time, since he was soon appointed, from June 1956 to October 1960, as Governor of Souk el Arba (now Jendouba), a Tunisian-Algerian border area, in the Northwestern part of the country, that represented a strategic spot and a contact-zone between the Algerian revolution, launched on November 1, 1954 and the Tunisian Government. Indeed, the town of Ghardimaou in the Governorate of Jendouba hosted the HQ of the National Liberation Army, the armed arm of the Algerian National Liberation Front, led in 1960 by Colonel Houari Boumediene.

In October 1960, Naceur Ben Jaâfar was transferred to the Governorate of Sfax, before he was appointed Governor of Bizerta in October 1961, two months after the Bizerta crisis. He held that position until July 1964.

In November 1964, he was elected as a member of the National Assembly, representing the Northern Tunis constituency. In 1966, he was elected as a member of the Tunis municipal council. On November 2, 1969, he was re-elected for Legislature 1969-1974 to represent the Tunis constituency, but died before the end of his term, on September 22, 1970.

== Private life ==
Naceur Ben Jaâfar was the germane cousin of Mustapha Ben Jafar, President of the second Constituent Assembly in the history of Tunisia, after its independence.
