= Baha al-Din al-Amili =

Iranian Shia Islamic scholar (1547–1621)

- بهاء الدين محمد بن حسين العاملي
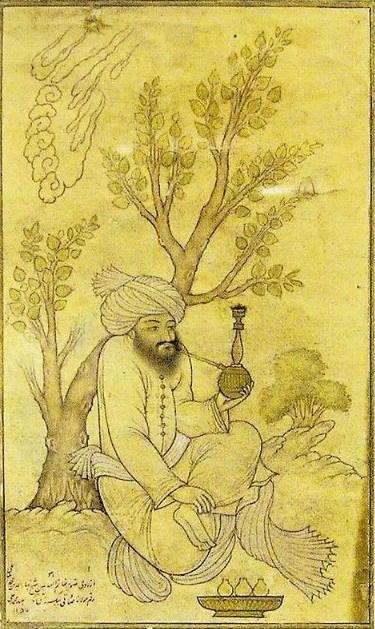
- Portrait of Baha al-Din al-Amili, falsely attributed to Sadiqi Beg, signed by "the slave Muhammad Ali", 1744–45. Malek National Museum and Library, Tehran
- Born: 18 February 1547; Baalbek, Ottoman Empire (present-day Lebanon)
- Died: 1 September 1621 (aged 74); Isfahan, Safavid Iran
- Burial place: Imam Reza shrine
- Other name: Sheikh Baha'i
- Era: Safavid era
- Known for: Urban planning of Safavid Isfahan, Naqsh-e Jahan Square, Shah Mosque, theological and scientific treatises

Religious life
- Religion: Islam
- Denomination: Shia
- Jurisprudence: Ja'fari (Usuli)
- Creed: Twelver

Muslim leader
- Influenced: Mulla Sadra, Mohsen Fayz Kashani

Baha al-Din al-Amili (Arabic: بهاء الدين العاملي; Persian: بهاءالدین عاملی: 18 February 1547 – 1 September 1621), commonly known as Sheikh Bahāʾī, was a Twelver Shia Muslim scholar and polymath in Safavid Iran, who composed various works in Arabic and Persian. Closely tied to the court of Shah Abbas I (r. 1587–1629), he became known for his role in the intellectual sphere of Isfahan and is seen as a leading figure in his field, with seventy-seven scholars counted among his students.

An ethnic Arab, he was originally from Jabal Amil (present-day south Lebanon) in Ottoman Syria. During his childhood, his family moved to Iran, where his father Husayn ibn Abd al-Samad became the shaykh al-Islam in Herat under Tahmasp I (r. 1524–1576).

He stands out as one of the most influential Arab figures, and figures generally, in shaping the scientific, cultural, urban, and intellectual identity of Safavid Iran.

He was the principal planner and architectural mind behind the transformation of Safavid Isfahan, credited with devising the overall spatial logic and ceremonial symbolism of the imperial capital. Sheikh Bahāʾī conceived the urban vision behind Naqsh-e Jahan Square and was instrumental in initiating the planning of the Shah Mosque, Sheikh Lotfollah Mosque, and Ali Qapu Palace. His designs also structured the layout of the Imperial Bazaar and he is also associated with hydraulic innovations and water management projects, though attributions such as the Zarrīn Kamar canal remain speculative. As chief advisor to Shah Abbas I, Sheikh Bahāʾī played a central role in defining the symbolic and geometric principles of Safavid civic and religious architecture. His commanding intellectual leadership and cohesive vision, executed through close collaboration with master builders and artisans, were instrumental in forging the Safavid architectural identity.

A prolific author in both Arabic and Persian, Sheikh Bahaʾī composed over one hundred treatises spanning jurisprudence, logic, astronomy, mathematics, and theology—primarily in his mother tongue, Arabic. His contributions also extended to literature and poetry, including didactic and mystical verse in Persian. In his Persian work Tashrīḥ al-Aflāk, he was among the earliest Muslim thinkers to propose the possibility of the Earth’s motion, anticipating the later diffusion of Copernican ideas in the Islamic world.

== Biography ==
Sheikh Baha' al-Din (also spelled Baha'uddin) Muhammad ibn Husayn al-'Amili was born near Baalbek, in Ottoman Syria (present-day Lebanon) in 1547. His family had moved there from a small village near Jezzine. After the execution of al-Shahid al-Tani in 1558, his father's mentor, he and his family moved to the neighboring Safavid Empire; first to Isfahan, and from there to Qazvin, the then Iranian royal capital. At the time, the Safavid realm was ruled by king Tahmasp I (r. 1524-1576). Tahmasp I appointed Sheikh Bahāʾī's father to serve as Shaykh al-Islām in several important Safavid cities in order to propagate Twelver Shi'ism amongst the population.

Sheikh Bahāʾī completed his studies in Isfahan. Having intended to travel to Mecca in 1570, he visited many Islamic countries including Iraq, Syria and Egypt and after spending four years there, he returned to Iran.

Sheikh Baha' al-Din died in 1621 in Isfahan. His body was buried in Mashhad according to his will.

=== Exact dates of birth and death ===
The exact dates of his birth and death are different on his grave stone and on the ceramic of the walls of the room where he is buried in.

Date of birth:

- On the ceramics of the wall: 27 February 1547
- On the grave stone: March 1546

Date of death:

- On the ceramics of the wall: 30 August 1621
- On the grave stone: August 1622

The dates on the wall contain day, month and year, while the dates on the grave stone only contain month and year. The ceramics of the wall are made in 1945. It seems that at that time a research is performed about the exact dates, and, therefore, the information about the day is added to the dates.

=== Pen name ===
According to Baháʼí Faith scholar ‘Abdu’l-Hamíd Ishráq-Khávari, Sheikh Baha' al-Din adopted the pen name (takhallus) 'Baha' after being inspired by words of Shi'a Imam Muhammad al-Baqir (the fifth Imam) and Imam Ja'far al-Sadiq (the sixth Imam), who had stated that the Greatest Name of God was included in either Du'ay-i-Sahar or Du'ay-i-Umm-i-Davud. In the first verse of the Du'ay-i-Sahar, a dawn prayer for the Ramadan, the name "Bahá" appears four times: "Allahumma inni as 'aluka min Bahá' ika bi Abháh va kulla Bahá' ika Bahí".

== Astronomy and mathematics ==
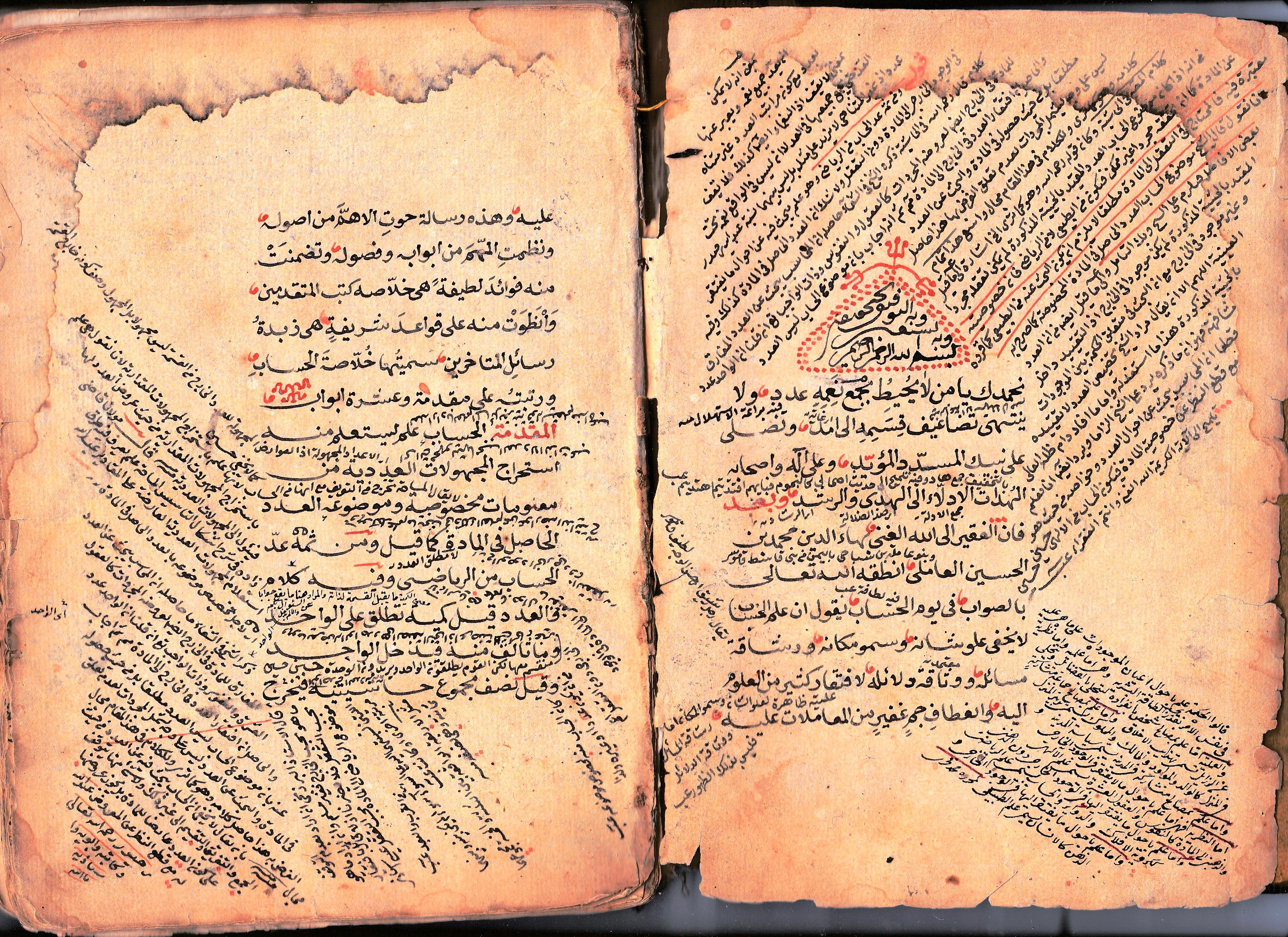
Manuscript of The Summa of Arithmetics

His interest in the sciences is also apparent by some of his works and treaties, although many of his astronomical treatises are yet to be studied. He probably have written 17 tracts and books on astronomy and related subjects. The following are some his works in astronomy:

- Risālah dar ḥall-i ishkāl-i ʿuṭārid wa qamar (Treatise on the problems of the Moon and Mercury), on attempting to solve inconsistencies of the Ptolemaic system within the context of Islamic astronomy.
- Tashrīḥ al-aflāk (Anatomy of the celestial spheres), a summary of theoretical astronomy where he affirms the view that supports the positional rotation of the Earth. He was one of Islamic astronomers to advocate the feasibility of the Earth's rotation in the 16th century, independent of Western influences.
- Kholasat al-Hesab (The summa of arithmetic) was translated into German by G. H. F. Nesselmann and was published as early as 1843.

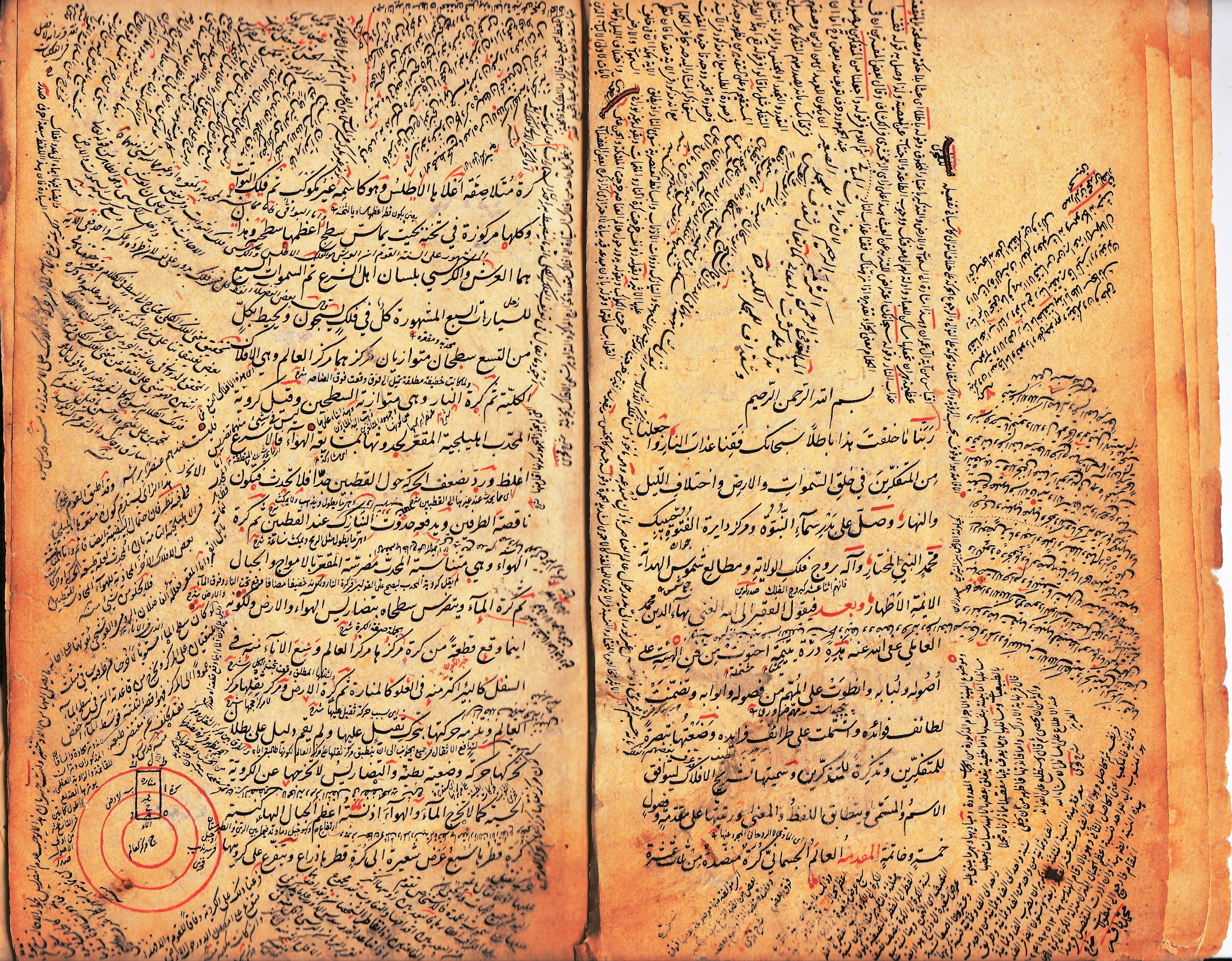
Manuscript of the Anatomy of Celestial Spheres

== Architecture ==
Sheikh Baha' al-Din was known for his proficiency in mathematics, architecture and geometry. A number of architectural and engineering designs are attributed to him, but none can be substantiated with sources. He is credited with designing the canal network of the Zayanderud river and a heating system for an Isfahan public bath that used a single candle. Some of his designs may have included the Naqsh-e Jahan Square and Charbagh Avenue in Isfahan.

== Shia jurisprudence ==
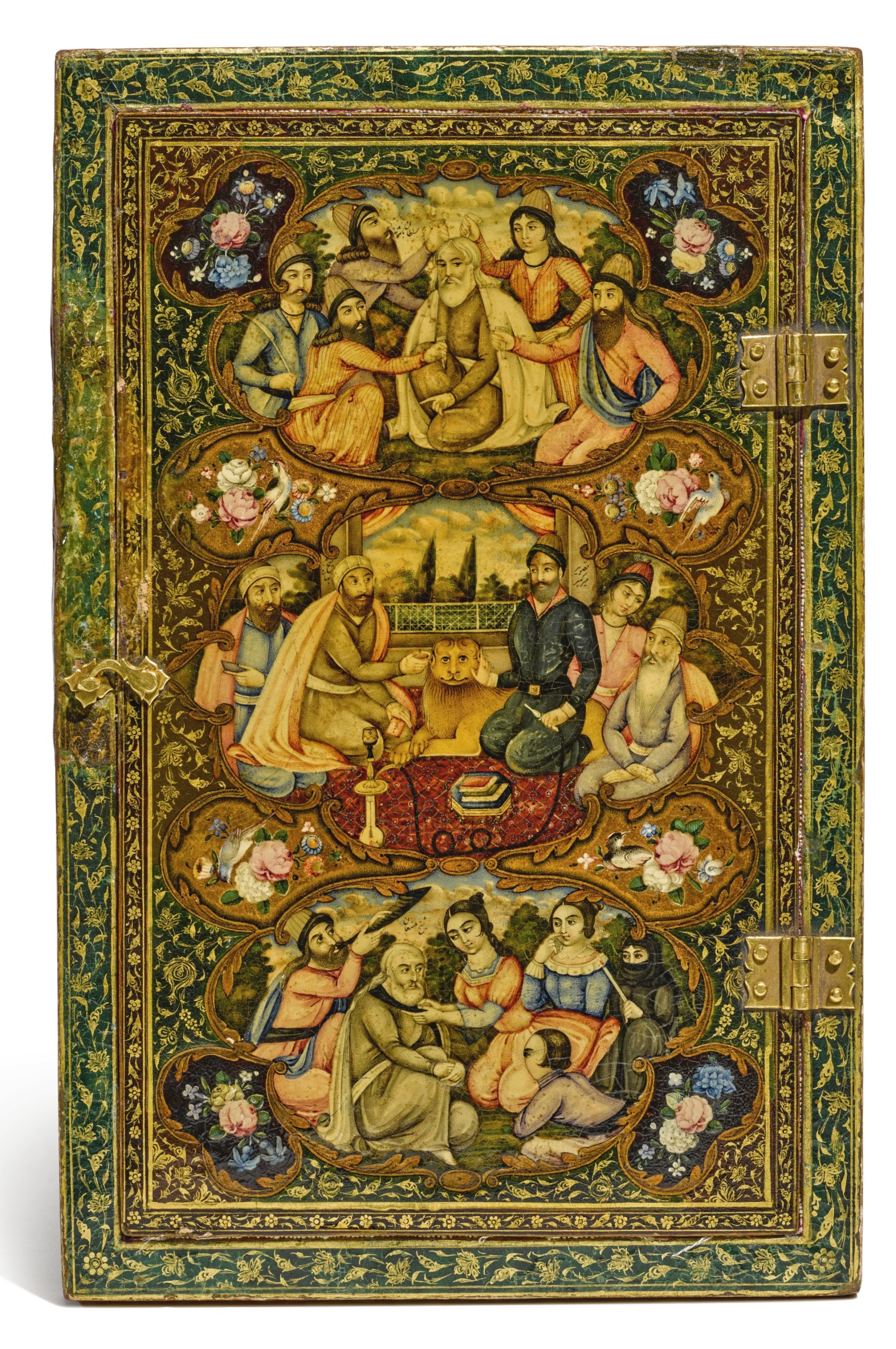
Sheikh Bahai (center left) meeting Shah Abbas (center right) by Muhammad Ismail Isfahani

In the Twelver tradition, Sheikh Bahai is regarded as a leading scholar of his age and a mujaddid of the seventeenth century. His erudition won him the admiration of Shah Abbas, and he was appointed the Sheikh ul-Islam of Isfahan after the death of the previous incumbent. He composed works on tafsir, hadith, grammar and fiqh (jurisprudence).

== Mysticism ==
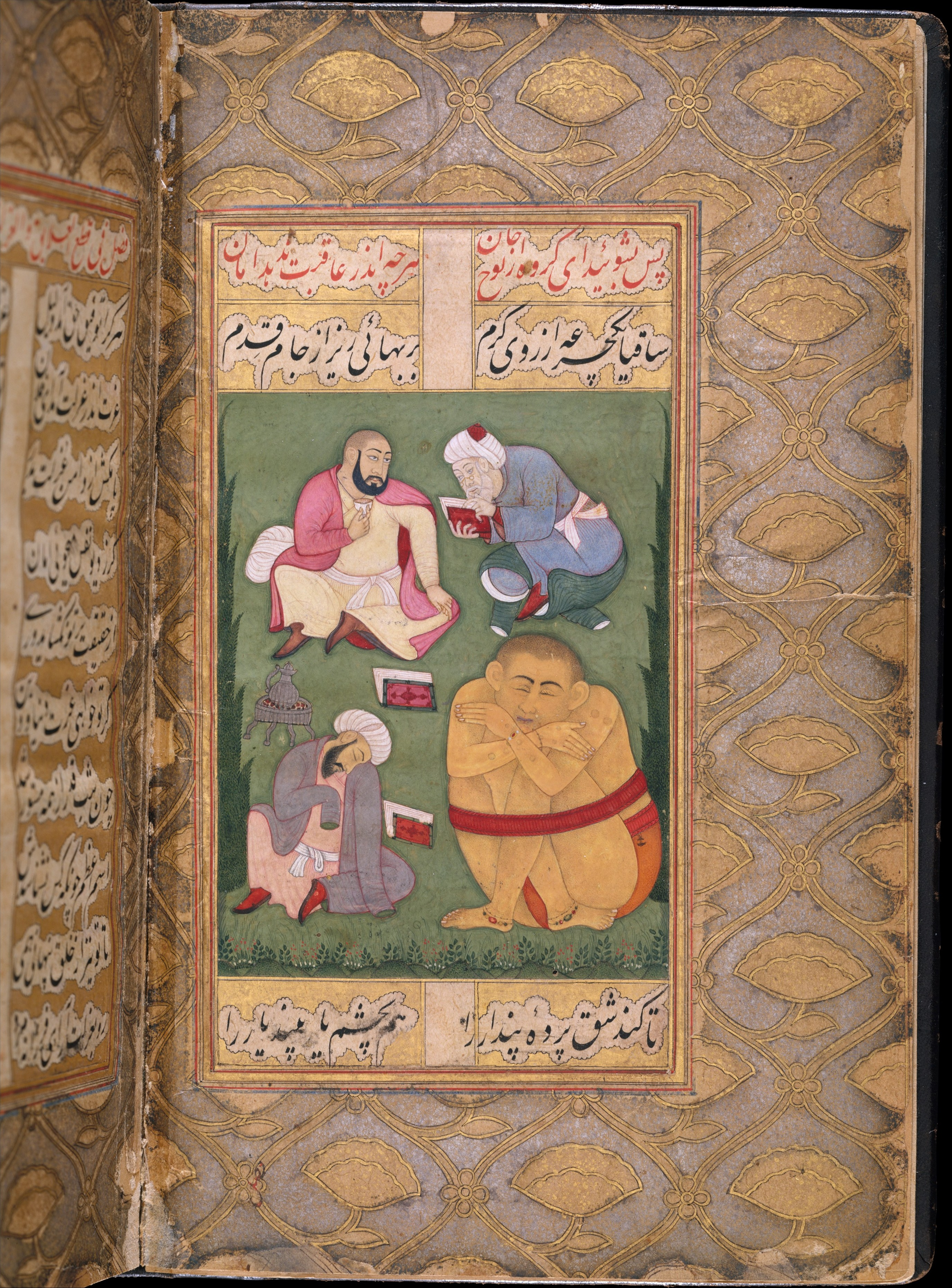
Illustrated manuscript of Nan wa Halwa

Sheikh Baha' al-Din was also an adept of mysticism. He had a distinct Sufi leaning for which he was criticized by Mohammad Baqer Majlesi. During his travels he dressed like a Dervish and frequented Sufi circles. He also appears in the chain of both the Nurbakhshi and Ni'matullāhī Sufi orders. In the work called "Resāla fi’l-waḥda al-wojūdīya" (Exposition of the concept of Wahdat al-Wujud (Unity of Existences), he states that the Sufis are the true believers, calls for an unbiased assessment of their utterances, and refers to his own mystical experiences. Both his Persian and Arabic poetry is also replete with mystical allusions and symbols. At the same time, Sheikh Baha' al-Din calls for strict adherence to the Sharia as a prerequisite for embarking on the Tariqah and did not hold a high view of antinomian mysticism.

== Works ==
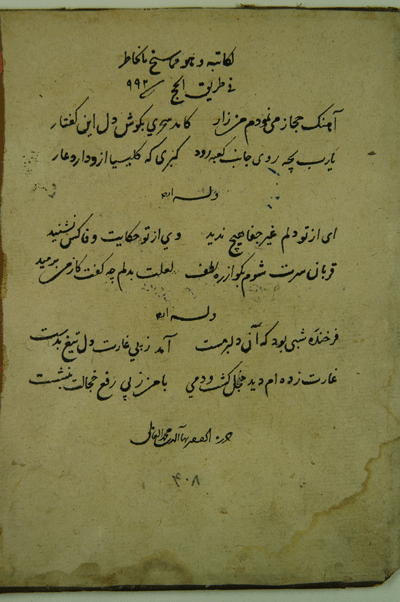
A manuscript by Sheikh Bahai

Sheikh Baha' al-Din contributed numerous works in philosophy, logic, astronomy and mathematics. His works include over 100 articles, epistles and books. Sheikh Baha' al-Din also composed poems in Persian and Arabic. His outstanding works in the Persian language are Jame-e Abbasi and two masnavis (rhymed couplets) by the names of Shīr u Shakar ("Milk and Sugar") and Nān u Halwā ("Bread and Halva").

His other important work is the Kashkūl, which includes stories, news, scientific topics, Persian and Arabic proverbs.

He also wrote Khulāṣat al-ḥisāb (Arabic: خلاصة الحساب, lit. "Essentials of arithmetic"), an Arabic textbook that became popular throughout the Islamic world from Egypt to India until the 19th century. It was translated into German in Berlin by G. H. F. Nesselmann and published in 1843. A French translation appeared later 1854.

=== Other works ===
- Meklāt (in Arabic)
- Kashkūl (in Persian and Arabic) (کشکول)
- Tūtī-Nāmah (in Persian) (طوطی نامه)
- Nān u Panīr (in Persian) (نان و پنیر)
- Shīr u Shakar (in Persian) (شیر و شکر)
- Nān u Halwā (in Persian and Arabic) (نان و حلوا)
- Jame-e Abbasi (in Persian) (جامع عباسی)
- Tashrīḥ Al-Aflāk (in Arabic) (تشريح الأفلاك)
- Al-fawayid as-Samadiah (in Arabic)
- Mashriq al-Shamsayn wa Iksīr al-Sa'adatayn (in Arabic) (مشرق الشمسين وإكسير السعادتين)
- Al-Athnā' Ash'ariyyah (in Arabic) (الأثناء عشرية)
- Zubdat al-Usūl (in Arabic) (زبدة الأصول)

== See also ==
- Sheikhbahaee University in Isfahan, which was named in his honor.
