= Ja'far Kashfi =

Iranian philosopher (1775/76 – 1850/51)

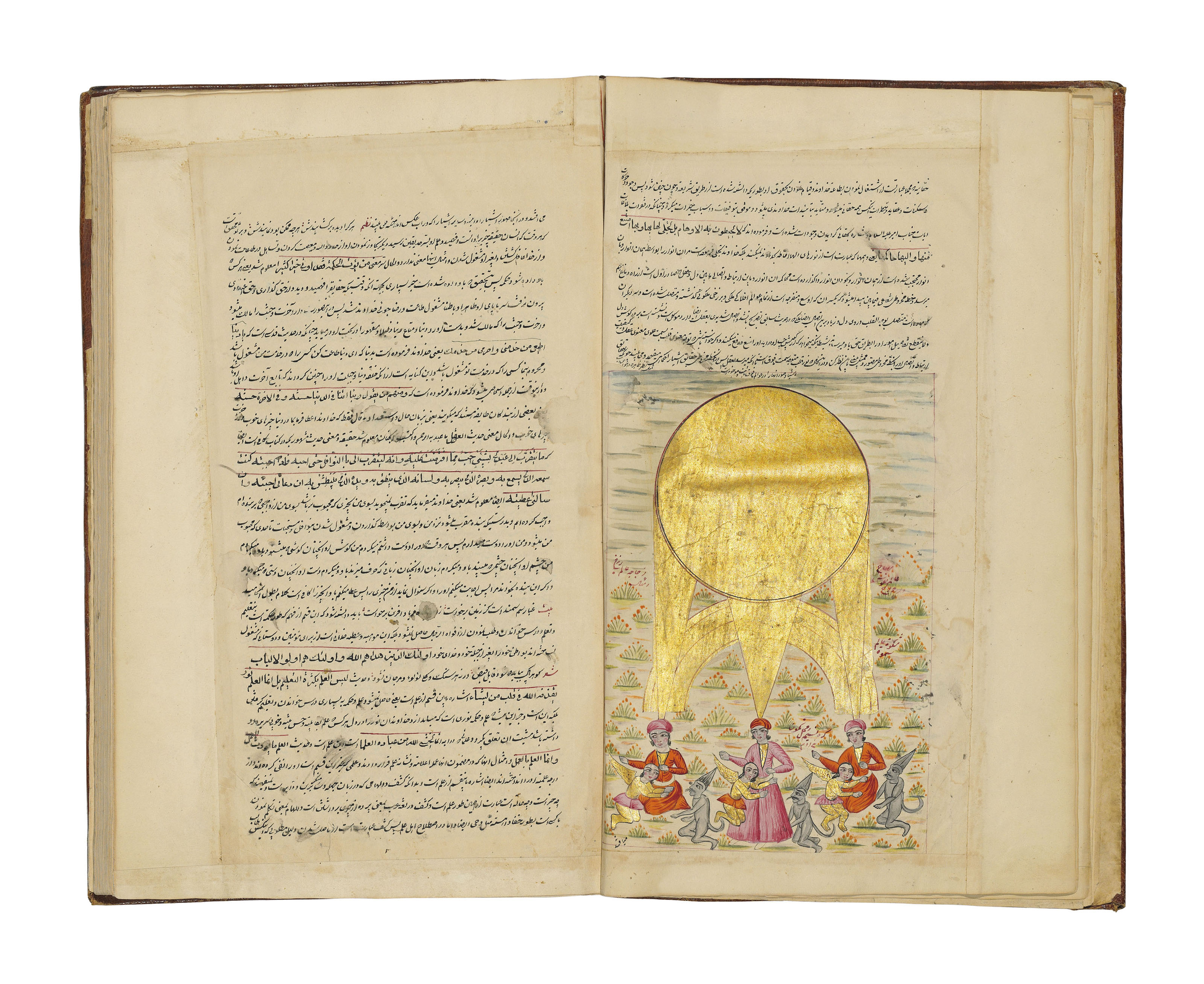
Qajar-era manuscript of Kashfi's Tuhfat al-Muluk, created in the first half of the 19th century during Kashfi's own lifetime

Ja'far Kashfi (Persian: جعفر کشفی; 1775/76 – 1850/51) was an Iranian Muslim philosopher who was born at Darabgard in Fars in 1775/76, lived all his life at Borujerd, and died in 1850/51. His work comprises about twelve titles, and is written in both Persian and Arabic. His great work in Persian is titled Tuhfat al-muluk (The Gift offered to the Sovereigns) and was written at the request of Prince Mohammad Taqi Mirza, a son of Fath-Ali Shah Qajar.
