= Seyed Jafar Kashfi =

Iranian calligrapher

Seyed Jafar Kashfi is an Iranian calligrapher and cultural worker, who lives in Qom in Iran. He was resident in Sweden for many years, where he worked as an imam, religious leader, and taught Islamic calligraphy. He was also instrumental in the publishing of translations of classical Persian poetry into Swedish. Jafar Kashfi is also an expert on the conservation of ancient and medieval monuments in Iran.

In 2014, Ahlulbayt TV made a short documentary on Islamic Calligraphy featuring Seyed. He discussed its various forms and styles, the tools used, and provided demonstrations of its practise.
