= Jamshid Giunashvili =

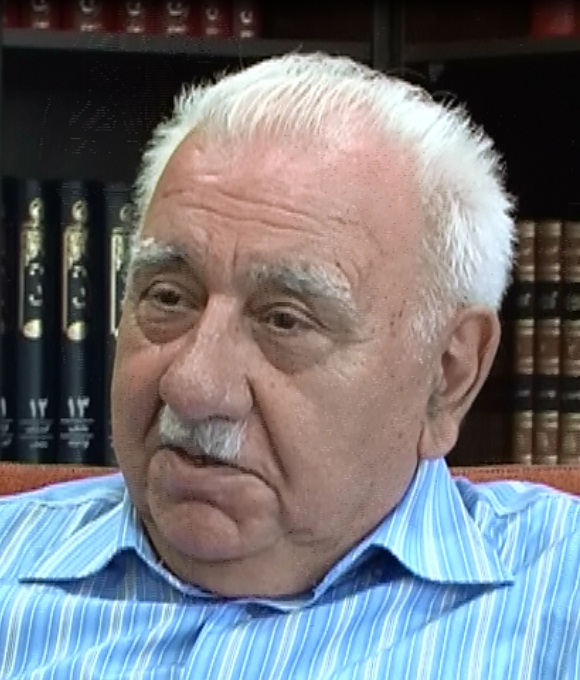
- Jamshid Giunashvili
- Born: 1 May 1931; Tehran, Iran
- Died: 21 January 2017 (aged 85); Tbilisi, Georgia

Jamshid Giunashvili (Georgian: ჯემშიდ გიუნაშვილი; 1 May 1931 – 21 January 2017) was a Georgian linguist, Iranologist, researcher, author, and diplomat, having served as the first ambassador of Georgia to Iran for a period of ten years, from 1994 to 2004. He is a graduate of Tbilisi State University with a doctors degree in Iranian studies. He was born in Tehran, Iran.

The Georgian researcher's efforts were primarily directed to deepen relations between Iran and Georgia, especially in terms of cultural and scientific visits, and through the publishing of more than 200 scientific works in Georgian, Persian, English, and Russian. He also won the 2010 International Award for Book of the Year of Iran. A festschrift in his honor was published in Enat'mec'nierebis sakit'xebi/Issues of Linguistics (Tbilisi State University, 2012).

== Biography ==
The father of Jamshid Giunashvili was an engineer going by the name of "Shalva Giunashvili" (1908–1981), the ninth child of an Orthodox priest, while his older brother (the uncle of Jamshid Giunashvili) was a prominent physician whom Soviet Union had labeled as an "enemy of the people", and was executed in 1924. Shalva's activities were not political, but the social and political conditions of the time in the Georgian SSR (about 1925 to 1930), in combination with his goodwill, and with his brother executed, Shalva Giunashvili was forced to emigrate from the Georgian SSR.

In 1929, along with his entire family, he moved to Iran, and two years later, in 1931, Jamshid Giunashvili was born in Tehran. In Iran, Jamshid's father worked as an engineer and participated in the railway constructions across the country (Khorramabad – Andimeshk, Arak – Qom, Semnan – Shahrud). Jamshid himself attended studies at the Alborz High School. The Giunashvili family stayed in Iran up to 1947.

The Giunashvili family returned to Georgia in 1947, and four years later, in 1951, they were deported to Kazakhstan.

Jamshid Gyvnashvyly started in 1956 his studies in the field of Iranian studies at the State University of Tashkent, and in the beginning of 1958 at the Tbilisi State University and the Georgian National Academy of Sciences, and continued his efforts focused on Iranian studies, for another fifty years of his life.

He has produced more than two hundred scientific-research works related to the studies of Iran in Georgian, Persian, English and Russian. Contribution to publication of the Georgian national epic The Knight in the Panther's Skin from Shota Rustaveli in Persian by Farshid Delshad (Persian Title: پلنگینه‌پوش) in 1998 was one of his academic achievements.

In 2010, during the seventeenth annual edition of the International Award for Book of the Year, he was awarded, by the president of Iran, the most important literary prize awarded Honorable Mention and Award of the Islamic Republic of Iran, and official praise for his decade-long efforts.

Professor Tamaz V. Gamkrelidze, former President of the Georgian National Academy of Sciences in the case of Giunashvili being the ambassador for 10 years to Iran and being Georgia's first ambassador to Iran;

"Doctor Jamshid, he's not just an Iranologist and scholar, but he's also is a career diplomat. He has been for a relatively long period the Georgian ambassador in Iran, and has played an important role in maintaining and deepening relations between the two nations of Iran and Georgia."

Giunashvili died on 21 January 2017 in Tbilisi, Georgia, aged 85.
