= Safavi (surname) =

Safavi (Persian: صفوی) is a Persian surname, best known as the surname of the royal family of the Safavid dynasty.

== Etymology ==
Some have argued that Safavi is a cognate of the word "Safaviyeh" (Persian: صفویه). And that "Safa" is a cognate of the word Sufi (Persian: صوفی). "Safavi" is an adjective, created for the name "Safi". Translated to English, "Safavi" would correspond roughly to "Safi-ish" or "Safidian" "Safavi" is the correct Persian language reference to "Safi" (Persian: صفی), the name of Sheikh Safi-ad-din Ardabili (Persian: صفی‌الدین اردبیلی). Similarly we speak of "Edwardian", when making a reference to the era affiliated with king Edward VII. Sheikh Safi's descendants have been going by this name for 770 years. There are numerous bearers of the name "Safavi" thriving in modern-day Iran, who claim descent from Sheikh Safi (Persian: شیخ صفی) or any of his royal heirs.

Many Safavis can still be found in East Azerbaijan, Ardebil Province and Isfahan Province – the former capital of the Safavid dynasty – and can also be found in Mashhad, Razavi Khorasan province. Safavis can also be found all across Iran. Another branch of the family is found in South Lebanon under the names Safa and Jaber, a branch of the Safa family.

== Safavid ==
The term "Safavid", as in Safavid dynasty (of which Sheikh Safi is the Eponym), is likewise referred to as "Safavi" by Persian speakers. The "d" at the end of "Safavid" was added by the principle of analogy with the Greek-derived names of several ancient dynasties, such as the Achaemenid dynasty and the Sassanid dynasty, based on the oblique cases of the Greek names. The English adjective "Safavid" and the name "Safavids" for the dynasty, and the corresponding forms in many European languages, are therefore based on a redundant application of adjective-forming rules.

The names "Safavid/Safavids" are well-established in the English language, however, and have become legitimate terms. When added to a Shah's name however, the original "Safavi", without the "d" at the end, must always be retained, e.g., Shah Ismail I Safavi.

== Notable people with the surname Safavi ==
- Aga Syed Mustafa Al-Moosavi Al-Safavi (1918–2002), was a Kashmiri Shia Muslim cleric, Islamic Jurist, Islamic scholar, philanthropist
- Aga Syed Yusuf Al-Moosavi Al-Safavi (1904–1982), was a Kashmiri religious scholar and leader of Shia Muslims; founder of Anjuman Sharie Shian
- Ali Mirza Safavi (?–1494), was the penultimate head of the Safavid order
- Azarmi Dukht Safavi (born 1948), Indian poet
- Bahram Mirza Safavi (1517–1549), was a Safavid prince
- Hamza Mirza Safavi (1532–1595/1596), fourth Safavid Shah
- Haydar Mirza Safavi (1554–1576), was a Safavid prince
- Isa Khan Safavi, was a Safavid prince
- Ismail Mirza Safavi (1537–1577), Shah of Persia
- Khvajeh Ali Safavi (?–1427), leader of the Safavid order
- Kourosh Safavi (born 1956), Iranian linguist, translator and university professor
- Mirza Badi-uz-Zaman Safavi (?–1659), was a prince of the Safavid dynasty
- Navvab Safavi (1924–1956), Iranian Shia cleric and founder of the Fada'iyan-e Islam group
- Nazi Safavi (born 1967), Iranian writer
- Razia Begum Safavi (1700–1776), Safavid princess and the royal consort of Shah Nader Shah
- Sam Mirza Safavi (1517–1566), was a Safavid prince
- Yahya Rahim Safavi (born 1952), Iranian military commander

== See also ==
- Safavid family tree
