= Sara Khatun =

Mother of Uzun Hasan (c. 1403–1465)

- Born: c. 1403
- Died: 1465 (aged 61–62); Diyarbakır
- Spouse: Ali Bey Bayandur
- Issue: Jahangir Beg; Uzun Hasan Beg; Hussein Beg; Jahanshah Beg; Iskander Beg; Ibrahim Beg; Uveysh Beg; Khadija Beyim Khatun
- Dynasty: Aq Qoyunlu
- Father: Pir Ali Bayandur
- Mother: a daughter of Ahmad b. Qutlu.

Sara Khatun (Azerbaijani: Sara Xatun), also Saray Khatun, was an influential woman of the Aq Qoyunlu state, as the political adviser of her son, Uzun Hasan (r. 1457–1478). She was a successful and well-respected diplomatic mediator.During Uzun Hasan’s wars with foreign powers, Sara Khatun served as his envoy. It seems that much of her life was devoted to diplomacy and efforts to establish peace, and she maintained relations with other governments through political correspondence.There is no precise record of Sara Khatun’s birth and death dates, but she is recognized as one of the influential women of the 9th century AH.

== Early life ==
According to historian John E. Woods, Sara Khatun was the daughter of Pir Ali Bayandur, the Aq Qoyunlu ruler of Kiğı, and her mother was a daughter of Ahmad b. Qutlu. Pir Ali was himself the son of the Aq Qoyunlu ruler Fakhr ad-Din Qutlu by his Pontic wife Maria Comnena, sister of Alexios III of Trebizond. German orientalist Franz Babinger speculates that Sara Khatun was an Aramaic Christian who grew up near Diyarbakir, but this speculation is based on an earlier assumption by Vladimir Minorsky which he later renounced. Sara Khatun married her paternal cousin Ali, the son of the leader of the Aq Qoyunlu federation Qara Osman. She widowed in 1444.

== Political influence ==
She, who accompanied Uzun Hasan through parts of his eventful life, also took part in battles alongside him, and was not only a comrade-in arms but also considered a political and military advisor to his son.

Sara Khatun came to have great political influence during the reign of her son. She was a skilful diplomat and headed embassies for the purpose of regulating disputed issues. Sara Khatun was well-known in the west, and foreign ambassadors frequently took advantage of her influence over her son. For example, in 1463 Josaphat Barbaro was sent from Venice to the court of Uzun Hasan with the instructions "Meet the ruler’s mother, assure her of respect and present gifts..." in order to persuade her to an "enterprise" beneficial to Venice (war with the Ottoman Empire).

She aided in the reconciliation of Uzun Hasan and her other son Jahangir, who had challenged Uzun-Hasan's rule. Sara Khatun was also sent to negotiate with the mother of Timurid ruler Abu Said, but her efforts were futile. She had also travelled to the Mamluk Sultanate, in an attempt to solve Jahangir's problems.

=== Negotiations with Mehmed II ===
Sara Khatun's negotiations with the Ottoman sultan Mehmed II were particularly successful. Negotiations with Mehmed II took place in 1461, during Mehmed II's Anatolian campaign. The Ottoman army captured Sinop and headed towards Trebizond. Fearing that Mehmed was planning an attack on the Aq Qoyunlu, Uzun-Hasan sent his mother to negotiate, accompanied by many sheikhs and princes from the region and expensive gifts.

According to Ottoman historians Tursun Beg and Sadeddin Efendi, Sara Khatun met with the influential Grand Vizier Mahmud Pasha at night and begged him for assistance. Mahmud Pasha responded positively to her request and arranged for her to meet with Mehmed. According to historian Steven Runciman, Mehmed treated Sara Khatun well because his plans at the time were limited to capturing the Black Sea coast. As a result, Mahmud Pasha accepted the proposals of Sara Khatun for peace. During the negotiations, she referred to Mehmed as "my son", while he referred to her as "mother". Sara Khatun tried to persuade Mehmed to not capture Trebizond as it was the land of her daughter-in-law, Despina Khatun: "Why waste so much effort, my son, because of such nonsense as Trebizond?" she asked. Mehmed, on the other hand, was not inclined to deviate from his plans. As a result, Sara Khatun made an agreement with Uzun Hasan not to interfere with the Ottoman Turks' capture of Trebizond. Despite her gracious reception, Mehmed refused to let her return with his men and detained her until the end of the campaign. This was done to avoid any Aq Qoyunlu attacks during the conquest of Trebizond. Sara Khatun was given piles of jewellery captured by the Ottomans in Trebizond in exchange for her mediation.

Sara Khatun may have granted asylum to the last Emperor of Trebizond, David, and his family for a brief period after Trebizond's capture. Mehmed II promised Sara Khatun that he would not harm the emperor or his family. Mehmed partially fulfilled the promise except for the daughter of Emperor David, Anna, who was taken into Mehmed's harem, and later married to Zaganos Pasha. Except for Anna and his nephew Alexei, the former emperor and his children were graciously received by the Sultan and sent on a special ship to Constantinople with courtiers and personal property. Two years later, however, David was charged with treason and executed alongside his son. The reason for David's execution was his correspondence with his niece, Uzun-Hasan’s wife, Despina-Khatun.

Another of Sara Khatun’s missions, ordered by Uzun Hasan’s son, was a journey to Cairo. She arrived in Cairo in the month of Rajab, 870 AH, and presented the keys of the city of Kharput to Sultan Khushqadam of the Mamluks. Sultan Khushqadam was pleased with this display of apparent submission and regarded it as a sign of Uzun Hasan’s goodwill.

She played a prominent role in the disputes that arose between Uzun Hasan and his brothers, Jahangir and Uways, who were claimants to power, as well as with Uzun Hasan’s sons, who occasionally rebelled disputes that sometimes even escalated to bloodshed.Jahangir Mirza, by taking refuge in Mardin in 857 AH / 1453 CE, launched military attacks against his brother Uzun Hasan. After failing on the battlefield, he attempted, through peaceful efforts and the mediation of their mother, to persuade Uzun Hasan to submit to his elder brother in accordance with tribal and clan traditions.When Uzun Hasan laid siege to Mardin in pursuit of his brother Jahangir Mirza, their mother, Sara Khatun, acted as a mediator for peace between the two brothers and persuaded Uzun Hasan to withdraw. Being an influential and wise woman, she asked Uzun Hasan on behalf of the people: “Where should Jahangir and his family go?” Uzun Hasan, feeling ashamed in front of his mother, abandoned his initial decision. However, he requested that Jahangir Mirza send one of his sons to serve him, which was duly carried out. In this way, their mother successfully established peace between the two brothers.The scope of this reconciliation extended even to Uzun Hasan’s third brother, Uways, who had rebelled. Jahangir Mirza’s son, Ali Khan Mirza, was also taken as a hostage by Uzun Hasan. The following year, Jahangir rebelled again but was ultimately forced to submit. He attempted to flee to the ruler of the Qara Qoyunlu, but after prolonged negotiations and efforts once again initiated by Sara Khatun he was compelled to obey his brother Uzun Hasan.

== Family ==
By her husband, Sara Khatun had seven sons and a daughter:

- Jahangir Mirza Beg
- Uzun Hasan Beg
- Hussein Beg
- Jahanshah Beg
- Iskander Beg
- Ibrahim Beg
- Uveysh Beg
- Khadija Beyim Khatun. She married Shaykh Junayd of Safavid dynasty between 1456 and 1459. Their son, Haydar Safavi, married his cousin Alamshah Halima Khatun, daughter of Uzun Hassan and Teodora Despina Khatun, and was father of Ismail I and grandfather of Tahmasp I.

== Literature ==
- Babinger, Franz (1992) [1978]. Mehmed the Conqueror and His Time. Bollingen Series 96. Translated from the German by Ralph Manheim. Edited, with a preface, by William C. Hickman (1992 ed.). Princeton, New Jersey: Princeton University Press. ISBN 0-691-09900-6.
- Runciman, Steven (1990). The fall of Constantinople, 1453 (Canto ed.). Cambridge: Cambridge University Press. ISBN 978-0-521-39832-9.
- Shukurov, Rustam (2001). Великие Комнины и Восток (1204-1461) [Great Comneni and the East (1204-1461)] (in Russian). Saint Petersburg: Алетейя. ISBN 978-5-89329-337-1.
- Berchet, Guglielmo (1865). La Repubblica di Venezia e la Persia [The Republic of Venice and Persia] (in Italian). Torino Tip. G.B. Paravia.
- Dolphin, Alderson Anthony (1956). The Structure of the Ottoman Dynasty (PDF). Oxford: Clarendon Press.
- Arayancan, Ayşe Atıcı (2011). "Akkoyunlu ve Karakoyunlu'da Kadının Devlet Yönetimi ve Diplomasideki Önemine İki Örnek: Hatun Can Begüm ve Sara Hatun" [Two Examples of the Importance of Women in State Administration and Diplomacy in Akkoyunlu and Karakoyunlu: Hatun Can Begüm and Sara Hatun]. Türkiyat Araştırmaları Dergisi (in Turkish). 29: 285–301.
- Babinger, Franz (1978). Mehmed the Conqueror and His Time. Princeton University Press. ISBN 978-0-691-09900-2.
- Finlay, George (1851). The history of Greece : from its conquest by the crusaders to its conquest by the Turks, and of the empire of Trebizond; 1204–1461. Edinburgh : Blackwood.
- Minorsky, Vladimir (2000). "Uzun Hasan". Encyclopaedia of Islam. 10: 963–967.
- Minorsky, Vladimir (1939). "A Civil and Military Review in Fars in 881/1476". Bulletin of the School of Oriental Studies. 10 (1). Cambridge University Press: 141–178. doi:10.1017/S0041977X00068270. S2CID 163069093.
- Sümer, Faruk (1989). "AKKOYUNLULAR". Islamansiklopedisi (in Turkish). 2: 270–274.
- Stavrides, Théoharis (2001). The Sultan of Vezirs: The Life and Times of the Ottoman Grand Vezir Mahmud Pasha Angelović (1453–1474). BRILL. ISBN 978-90-04-12106-5.
- Woods, John E. (1999). The Aqquyunlu: Clan, Confederation, Empire. University of Utah Press.
- Shemshek, Vesile (2020). "Some Considerations On The Political Activities Of Sara Hatun, The First Diplomat In Turkish-islamic History". The Journal of Social Science. 4 (7): 349–358. ISSN 2587-0807.
