= Mohammad Beg Talish =

Safavid dignitary military commander

Mohammad Beg Talish (Persian: محمد بیگ تالش, romanized: Moḥammad Beyg Ṭāleš) was a dignitary military commander of Talysh origin, who resided in Khalkhal and served the Safavid order. He married Shah-Pasha Khatun when her father, Shaykh Junayd (d. 1460), was still alive. Shah-Pasha Khatun was the only surviving sister of Shaykh Haydar (1459–1488). This marriage brought an alliance which helped the Safavid dynasty during the last phase of their struggle for power.

He later became guardian (laleh) of Ismail I (r. 1501–1524) and played a crucial role in his rise to the throne. Mohammad Beg and his spouse were to play an instrumental role in Ismail's safe passage from Gilan to Ardabil via Talish on the eve of his campaign.

A faction of Talishi followers of the Safavid order, led by Mohammad Beg, made an attempt against Ismail's life on the eve of his travel to eastern Anatolia. According to Qasem Beg Hayati Tabrizi (fl. 1554), a poet and bureaucrat of the early Safavid era, rumors of Mohammad Beg's involvement in the assassination plot proved unfounded and Ismail spared him, but shortly thereafter, Ismail ordered the execution of Mohammad Beg and appointed his brother-in-law, Hossein Beg Shamlu, as laleh. Hasan Beg Rumlu and other Safavid chroniclers of the 16th-century did not mention these events.

== Sources ==
- Ghereghlou, Kioumars (2016). "ḤAYDAR ṢAFAVI". In Yarshater, Ehsan (ed.). Encyclopædia Iranica (online ed.).
- Ghereghlou, Kioumars (October–December 2017). "Chronicling a Dynasty on the Make: New Light on the Early Ṣafavids in Ḥayātī Tabrīzī's Tārīkh (961/1554)". Journal of the American Oriental Society. 137 (4): 805–832. doi:10.7817/jameroriesoci.137.4.0805 – via Columbia Academic Commons.
- Szuppe, Maria (2003). "Status, Knowledge, and Politics: Women in Sixteenth-Century Safavid Iran". In Nashat, Guity; Beck, Lois (eds.). Women in Iran from the Rise of Islam to 1800. Champaign, Illinois: University of Illinois Press. pp. 140–167. ISBN 0-252-07121-2.

New title	laleh of Ismail I	Succeeded by Hossein Beg Shamlu
