= Khvajeh Mohammad Safavi =

Uncle of Shah Ismail I

Khvajeh Mohammad Safavi (Persian: خواجه محمد صفوی) was a son of Shaykh Junayd, leader of the Safavid order (1447–1460), born by a Circassian concubine. He was an older (half)-brother of Shaykh Haydar, the successor of Shaykh Junayd as leader of the Safavid order, and therefore an uncle of the founder of the Safavid dynasty, Ismail I (r. 1501–1524) He had another brother named Khvajeh Jamshid, who was killed in southern Dagestan during one of Shaykh Haydar's campaigns. Khvajeh Mohammad's only surviving sister, Shah-Pasha Khatun, was married to Mohammad Beg Talish, a military chief from Khalkhal who would later become guardian (laleh) to Ismail I and play a pivotal role in his ascension to power in the early 16th century.

== Sources ==
- Ghereghlou, Kioumars (2016). "ḤAYDAR ṢAFAVI". Encyclopaedia Iranica.
- Nashat, Guity; Beck, Lois, eds. (2003). Women in Iran from the Rise of Islam to 1800. University of Illinois Press. ISBN 978-0252071218.
