= Shaykh Haydar's Caucasian campaign (1486–1487) =

War in eastern Europe

Sheikh Haydar's Second Caucasus Campaign
- Part of Sheikh Haydar's campaigns in Caucasus
Date	1486–1487
Location	Circassia
Result	Circassian victory

Belligerents
Aq Qoyunlu: Safavid order; Qizilbash; Rumlu; Shamlu	Circassia: Principality of Chemguy; Princedom of Kabardia; Alans (Ossetians)

Commanders and leaders
Haydar (WIA); Yaqub Sultan	(Circassia) Unknown Circassian princes

Strength
likely 10,000	Unknown

Casualties and losses
9,980~; (only about 20 survived per Barbaro)	Unknown amount of Circassian casulties; 6,000 enslaved in Dagestan

The Second Campaign of Sheikh Haydar was a 1486–1487 military expedition of the Qizilbash forces led by Sheikh Haydar, the father of Ismail I, into the North Caucasus. The campaign targeted the Circassian principalities, including Kabardia and Chemguy, as well as Christian Alans. Despite initial advances through Derbent and northwestern regions, Sheikh Haydar and Sultan Yaqub's forces were defeated by the Circassian defenders and forced to retreat to Ardabil, taking 6,000 prisoners from Dagestan.

== Background ==
In order to reach the North Caucasus, Haydar had to cross areas ruled by the Shirvanshah (specifically the Shirvanshah rulers of Salyan and Mahmudabad), who were hostile as they were allied to the Ak Koyunlu ruler of Azerbaijan, Sultan Ya'qub. Therefore, Haydar ordered for the production of boats in Khalkhal and Astara, in order to avoid having to go by land. By using boats, Haydar and his men would be able to circumvent the Shirvanshahs, reaching Derbent and coastal Dagestan through the Caspian Sea. In particular, the towns of Agrica and Mian-Qeslaq seem to have been the main target at the time. In around 1473-3, Haydar and his men performed their first seaborne attack on Dagestan, during which they plundered the predominantly Dagestan people-inhabited town of Qaytaq as well as the Hamiri plain.

Subsequently, he initiated three military campaigns against various rural areas and villages in the Northern Caucasus. According to Prof. Roger Savory, meant to drill his men, these raids targeted the "infidels" of Circassia and Dagestan. These were however probably the Christian Alans (nowadays better known as Ossetians) who roamed to the north of the Darial Pass as well as the Kabardian subgroup of Circassians.

== History ==
Unlike his father, Ya'qub Beg was not interested in popular religious rites and alienated a large part of the people, especially the Turks. Therefore, the vast majority of Turks became involved in the Safawiya order, which became a militant organization with an extreme Shiite ideology led by Sheikh Haydar.

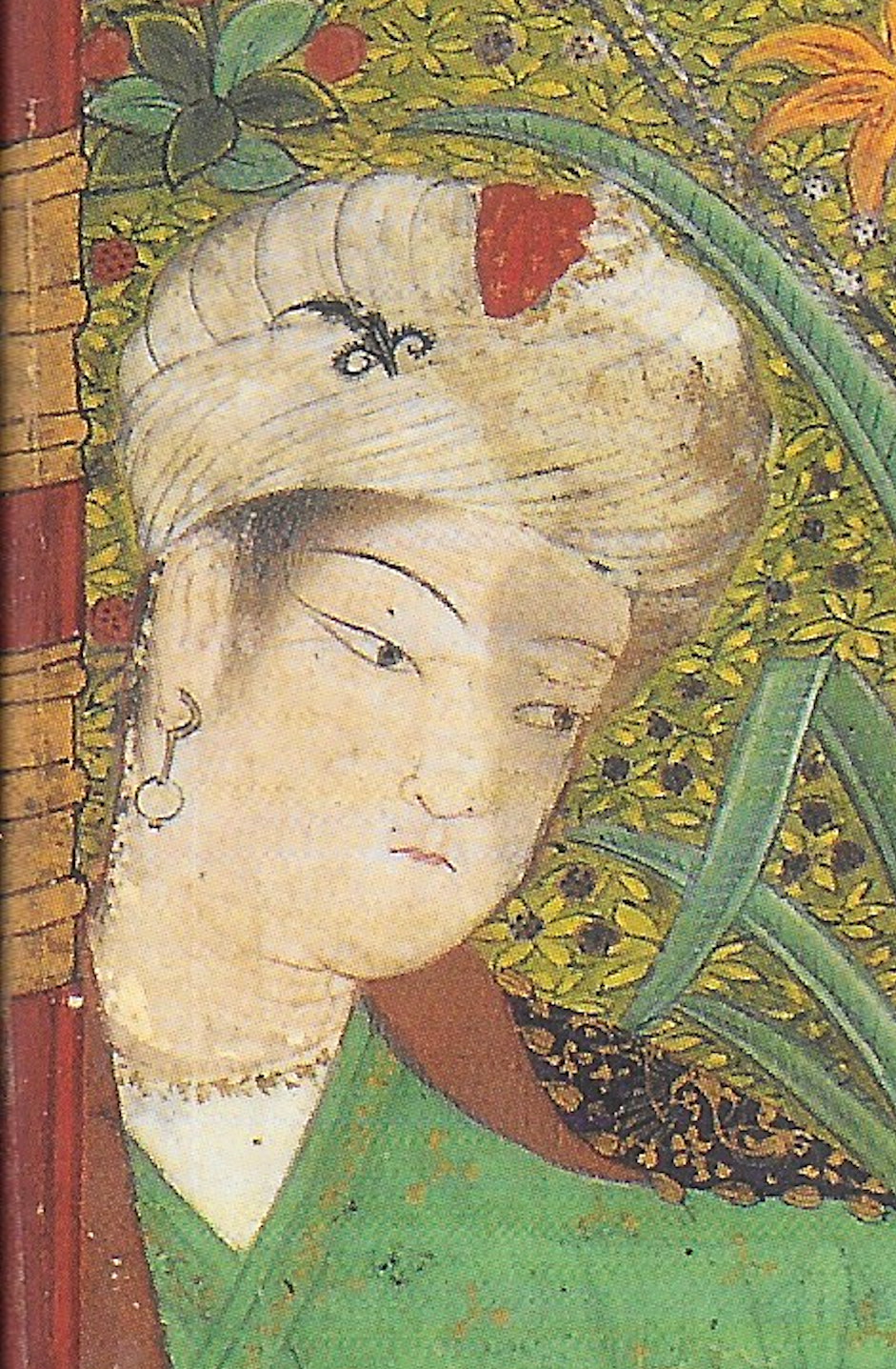
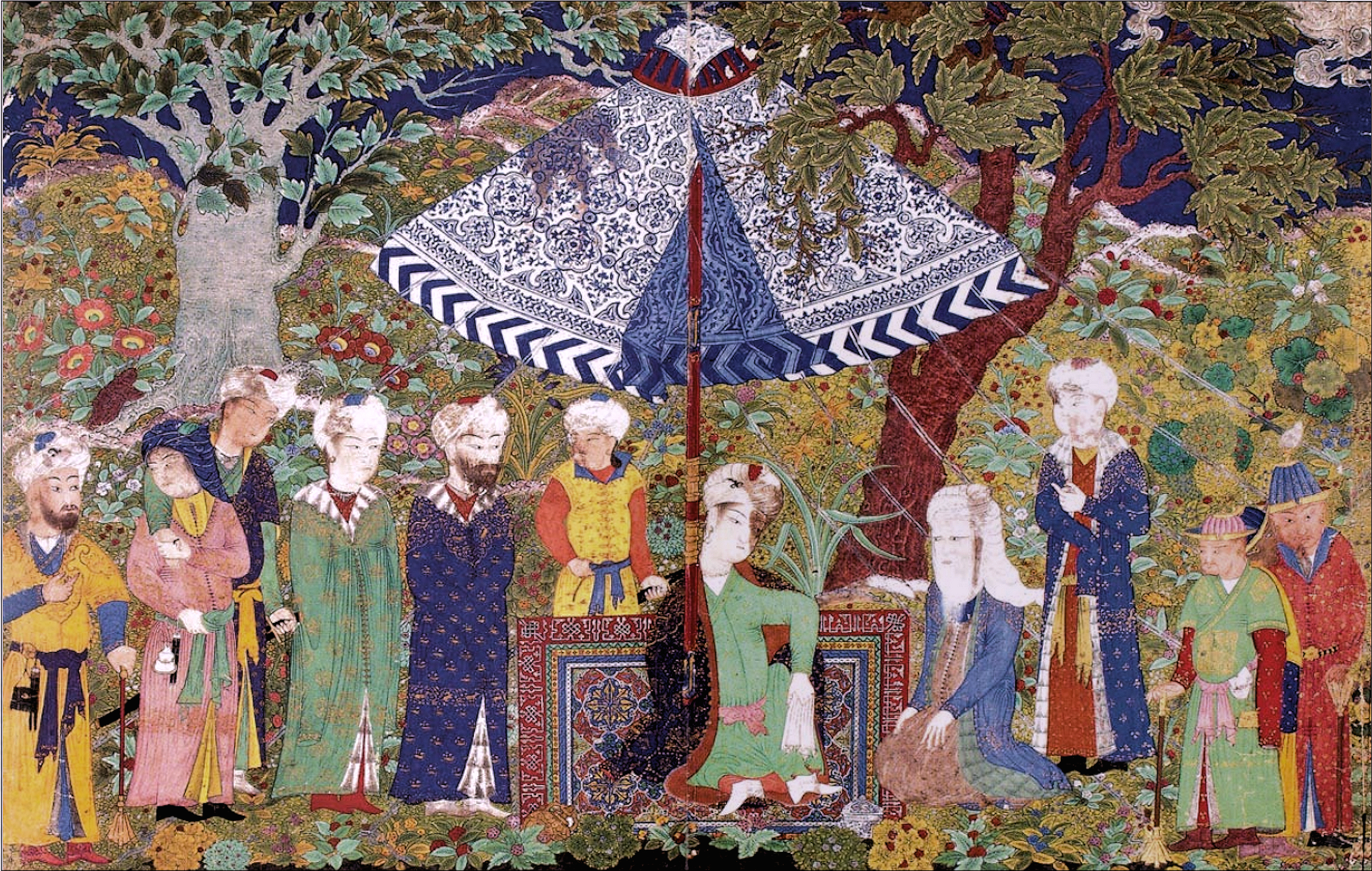
Contemporary portrait of Sultan Ya'qub (detail) with his court, painted in 1478-90 in Tabriz. Topkapı Sarayı Library (H. 2153).

Ya'qub initially sent Sheikh Haydar and his followers to a holy war against the Circassians, but soon decided to break the alliance because he feared the military power of Sheikh Haydar and his order.

In the late 15th century, Sheikh Haydar, led several military raids into the northern Caucasus region. During his second major campaign around 1486–1487, his forces advanced from Derbent towards the lands inhabited by the Circassians (referred to as “Cherkess” in some sources).

Haydar’s troops, motivated by religious zeal, attacked Christian populations such as the Alans (Ossetians), Circassians, Kabardians and various other societies in the area north of the Darial Pass and near the Black Sea coast. However, near the Black Sea coast, the local Circassians, confronted Haydar’s forces in a decisive battle. The Circassians achieved a significant victory, inflicting heavy losses and forcing the Safavid raiders into a disorderly retreat.

Following this defeat, only a small fraction of Haydar’s army survived and withdrew to their base in Ardabil. Despite the setback, the raiders managed to capture approximately 6,000 prisoners and pillaged the surrounding areas during their campaign.

== Sources ==
- Ghereghlou, Kioumars (2016). "ḤAYDAR ṢAFAVI". Encyclopaedia Iranica.
- Jackson, Peter; Lockhart, Lawrence, eds. (1986). The Cambridge History of Iran. Vol. 6. Cambridge: Cambridge University Press. ISBN 978-0521200943.
- Savory, Roger (2007). Iran Under the Safavids. Cambridge: Cambridge University Press. ISBN 978-0521042512.
