= Vali Maleki =

- ولی ملکی

Member of the Islamic Consultative Assembly
- In office 28 May 2016 – 26 May 2020
- Preceded by: Younes Asadi
- Constituency: Meshginshahr
- Majority: 22,457
- In office 24 May 2004 – 20 May 2008
- Preceded by: Khalil Aghaei
- Succeeded by: Younes Asadi
- Constituency: Meshginshahr
- Majority: 24,715

Personal details
- Born: 1961 (age 64–65) Meshginshahr, Iran
- Party: Executives of Construction
- Education: University of Tabriz

Vali Maleki (Persian: ‌ولی ملکی) is an Iranian politician and food industry engineer. He was born in Meshginshahr, Ardabil province. He was a member of the seventh legislative election and Maleki is MP of tenth Islamic Consultative Assembly from the electorate of Meshginshahr.

== Education ==
He completed his graduation of food industry engineering from the University of Tabriz. He has also received his master's degree in this field from the Science and Research Branch of the Islamic Azad University and is a Ph.D. in Strategic Management from the University of Iranian Industries.
