= Safavid family tree =

Genealogy of Iranian dynasty

The oldest extant book on the genealogy of the Safavid family is Safvat as-safa, written by Ibn Bazzaz in 1350, a disciple of Sheikh Sadr-al-Din Safavi and son of Sheikh Safi ad-din Ardabili. According to Ibn Bazzaz, the Sheikh was a descendant of a Kurdish man named Firooz Shah Zarrin Kolah who was from Sanjar, southeast of Diyarbakir. The male lineage of the Safavid family given by the oldest manuscript of the Safvat as-Safa is: "Sheykh Safi al-Din Abul-Fatah Ishaaq the son of Al-Sheykh Amin al-din Jebrail the son of al-Saaleh Qutb al-Din Abu Bakr the son of Salaah al-Din Rashid the son of Muhammad al-Hafiz al-Kalaam Allah the son of ‘Avaad the son of Birooz al-Kurdi al-Sanjari."

Safavid shahs themselves claimed to be Seyyeds, family descendants of the Ali ibn Abi Talib, this claim appeared to be old, the claim comes from Safvat as-safa, some suggest that Tahmasp I during the reign of Shah Ismail I ordered to be added a lineage after Firuz-Shah Zarrin-Kolah, which didn’t exist in older version of Safvat as-safa.

The great-grandson of Sheyk Safi, Sheik Joneyd, married Khadija Begum sister of Uzun Hassan and daughter of Ali Beg by his wife Theodora of Trebizond, daughter of Alexios IV of Trebizond. Heydar, son of Joneyd, married Katherina who was a daughter of Uzun Hassan by his wife Theodora, daughter of a Bagrationi Georgian princess and John IV of Trebizond.

Firooz Shah Zarrin Kolah
Avaad
Qotb al-Din Mohammad
Salah al-Din Rashid
Qotb al-Din Abu Bakr
Basil of Trebizond	Irene of Trebizond	Zahediyya Sheikh Taj Al-Dīn Zahed Gilanī	Amin al-Din Jebrail
Alexios III of Trebizond	Theodora Kantakouzene	Bibi Fatima	Safaviyya Sheikh Safī Al-Dīn Abolfath Is'hāq Ardabilī; 1252–1334
Constantine I of Georgia; 1369–1412	Manuel III of Trebizond; 1364–1417	Safaviyya Sheikh Sadr al-Dīn Mūsā
Alexander I of Georgia; 1386–1446	Alexios IV of Trebizond; 1382–1429	Qara Yuluk Osman	Safaviyya Sheikh Khoja Alā ad-Dīn Ali
Princess Bagrationi; 1415–1438	John IV of Trebizond; 1403–1459	Ali Beg	Safaviyya Sheikh Ibrahim Shāh
Alexios; 1455–1463	Theodora	Uzun Hassan; 1423–1478	Khadija Begum	Safaviyya Sheikh Junāyd
Alamshah Halime Begum	Sheikh Haydar Safavi Sultan
Sultan Ali Safawi; Reigned: 1488–1494	Shah Ismail I July 17 1487 – May 23 1524; R. 1502–1524	Ibrahim Safawi
Shah Tahmasp I 22 February 1514 – 14 May 1576; R. 1524–1576
Mohammed Khodabanda; 1532–1595; R. 1577–1587	Ismail II; 1537–1577; R. 1576–1577
Abbas I January 27 1571 – January 19 1629; R. 1587–1629
Safi Mirza born. 1587 killed 1615; Crown Prince 1587–1615	Imam Quli Mirza; Crown Prince 1627; Killed 1627
Shah Safi I 1611 – 12 May 1642; R. 1629–1642
Abbas II; 31 december 1632 – 25 October 1666; R. 1642–1666
Suleiman I (Shah Safi II); 1659 – July 29 1694; R. 1666–1694
Soltan Hoseyn; 1669 – April 25 1726; R. 1694–1722	Shahbanu Begum
Maryam Begum Safavi	Tahmasp II; 1704–1740; R. 1729–1732	Khan Ahga Begum	Suleiman II; 1714–1763; R. 1749–1750
Ismail III; 1733 – 1773; R. 1750–1751, 1751-1773	Abbas III; 1731–1740; R. 1732–1736

== Sources ==
- Amanat, Abbas (2017). Iran: A Modern History. Yale University Press. p. 41. ISBN 978-0300231465.

== See also ==
- Safavid dynasty
- Byzantine Emperors family tree
- List of mothers of the Safavid shahs
