= Ali Mirza Safavi =

Safavid sheikh (1469–1494)

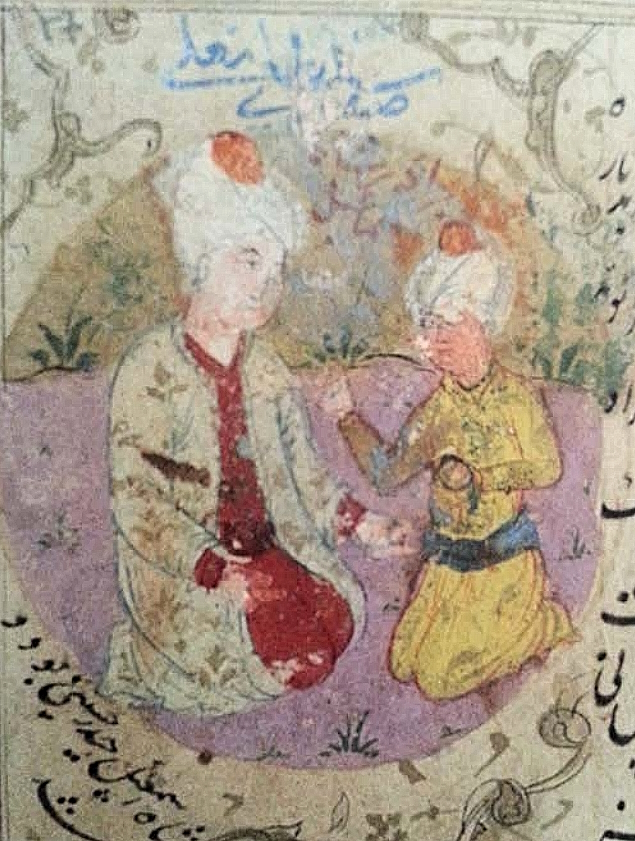
- Shaykh Haydar (left) with his son Ali Mirza Safavi (right). Cemʿ-i Tārīh, Museum of Ethnography, Ankara, No. 8457, fol. 17a.

7th Sheikh of the Safavid order
- In office 1488–1494
- Preceded by: Shaykh Haydar
- Succeeded by: Ismail I

Personal details
- Born: 874 AH (1469/1470 CE) Sham Asbi, Aq Qoyunlu
- Died: 1494 (aged 23–24)
- Parents: Shaykh Haydar (father); Alamshah Halime Begum (mother)
- Relatives: Ismail I (brother); Fakhr-Jahan Khanum (sister); Ebrahim Mirza (brother); Malek Khanum (sister); Sayyed Hassan (brother)

Ali Mirza Safavi (Persian: علی‌میرزا صفوی), also known as Soltan-Ali Safavi (سلطان علی صفوی) (died 1494), was the penultimate head of the Safavid order. Having grown wary of his political power, Ali Mirza was captured by the Ak Koyunlu and spent several years in captivity in Fars before being released in 1493 by prince Rostam. In the ensuing period he and his men assisted the prince in defeating Baysonqor bin Yaqub. A year later however, in 1494, now perceiving the Safavid order as a threat to his own position, Rostam ordered for the execution of Ali Mirza Safavi. Realizing his inevitable fate, shortly before his death, Ali Mirza Safavi appointed his brother Ismail as his successor. Ismail, in turn, eventually came to establish the Safavid Empire, with the regnal name Ismail I (r. 1501–1524).

== Biography ==
Ali Mirza Safavi was the eldest son of Shaykh Haydar by his wife Alam-Shah Begum (Halima, Mart[h]a), daughter of Uzun Hasan by Despina Khatun (Theodora Megale Komnene). According to Qasem Beg Hayati Tabrizi he was born in 1469/1470 in Sham Asbi village, outskirts of Ardabil.

He succeeded his father as head of the Safavid order after his death at Tabasaran in Dagestan in 1488. Ali Mirza Safavi was the first head of the Safavid order to assume the title of Padeshah. According to Roger Savory (1985), this was "a clear indication that by this stage the Safavids were aspiring to temporal as well as spiritual authority". The attribution of the title of Soltan, given to Ali Mirza Safavi by later historians, is doubtful; Ali Mirza probably didn't use the title himself according to Savory.

At some point, Sufi's of the Safavid order mobilized themselves at Ardabil around Ali Mirza Safavi, and instigated him "to avenge his father's death", in which the Ak Koyunlu had been involved. Dismayed by the news, the ruler of the Ak Koyunlu, Yaqub bin Uzun Hasan, ordered for the arrest of Ali Mirza Safavi and a number of his relatives, including his mother and two brothers. They were imprisoned at the fortress of Istakhr in Fars. Had it not been for the intervention of his mother, who also happened to be Yaqub bin Uzun Hasan's sister, Yaqub bin Uzun Hasan would have probably executed Ali Mirza.

Ali Mirza Safavi spent more than four years incarcerated; he was eventually released in 1493 by a prince of the Ak Koyunlu named Rostam, who happened to be one of the claimants to the throne following Yaqub bin Uzun Hasan's death in 1490. Rostam wanted to use Ali Mirza Safavi and his followers (i.e. members of the Safavid order) to capture the throne. In turn, Rostam reportedly promised Ali Mirza Safavi to give him "the throne of Iran after his own death". In the ensuing period, in 1493, Ali Mirza Safavi and his men assisted Rostam in defeating the incumbent Baysonqor bin Yaqub. However, soon after, in 1494, Rostam realized that Ali Mirza Safavi and his order were an actual threat to his own position, and thus ordered for the arrest of Ali Mirza Safavi and his brothers. Ali Mirza Safavi and his brothers, accompanied by a small retinue, managed to escape from Rostam's camp and moved towards Ardabil. Rostam however was aware that the reunification of Ali Mirza Safavi and his men could mean possible danger to his own position. He thus "sent a force in hot pursuit" after the fugitives.

Realizing his own inevitable fate, Ali Mirza Safavi appointed his brother Ismail as his successor, and ordered him to move ahead to reach Ardabil. Ali Mirza Safavi himself was caught by the Ak Koyunlu troops at Shamasbi near Ardabil, and killed. On the order of his mother, Alam-Shah Begum (Halima, Mart[h]a), his body was taken to Ardabil where it was buried. His brother Ismail eventually founded the Safavid Empire some years later, and became regnally known as Ismail I (r. 1501–1524).

== See also ==
- Safavid dynasty family tree

== Sources ==
- Ghereghlou, Kioumars (2016). "ḤAYDAR ṢAFAVI". Encyclopaedia Iranica.
- Savory, R. M. (1985). "ʿALĪ MĪRZĀ". Encyclopaedia Iranica, Vol. I, Fasc. 8. p. 868.
- Taner, Melis (2020). "Illustrated Manuscripts Attributed to Baghdad". Caught in a whirlwind: a cultural history of Ottoman Baghdad as reflected in its illustrated manuscripts. Leiden; Boston: Brill. ISBN 978-9004412699.

Ali Mirza Safavi Safavid dynasty
Preceded by Haydar Safavi	Leader of the Safavid order 1488–1494	Succeeded by Ismail I
