= Safaviya =

Safavia (Persian: صفویه) may refer to

- Safaviya (sufi order), a Sufi order founded by Safi-ad-din Ardabili
- Safavid dynasty, a ruling dynasty of Iran, founded by Ismail I
