= Tomb of Shaykh Haydar =

Iranian national heritage site

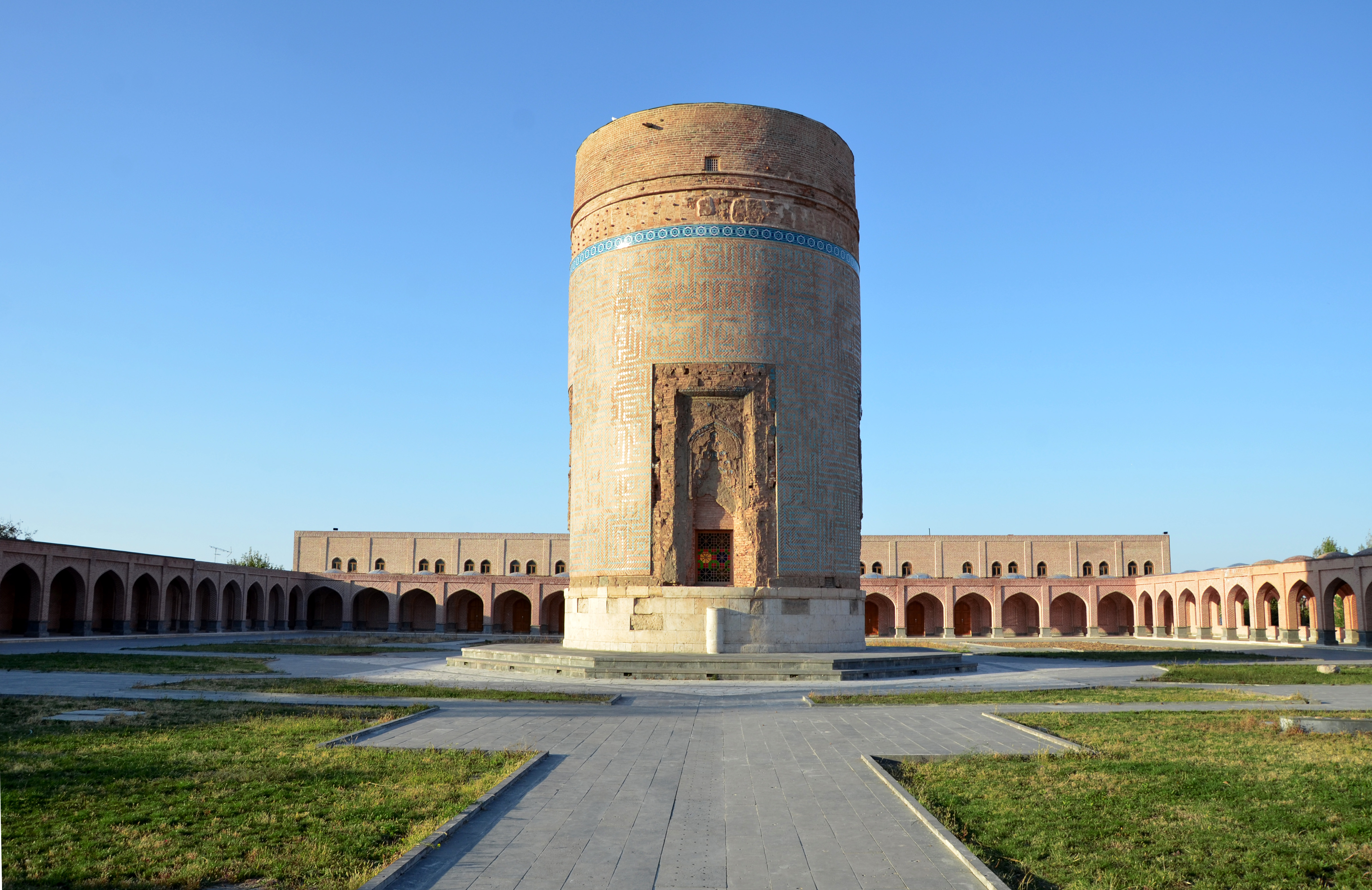

- Location within Iran

Religion
- Affiliation: Islam
- Province: Ardabil Province
- Year consecrated: 14th century

Location
- Location: Meshginshahr, Iran
- Coordinates: 38.4013017°N 47.6803720°E

Architecture
- Type: mausoleum
- Style: Persian architecture
- Completed: 16th century

Specifications
- Width: 10.5 m (34 ft)
- Height (max): 18.5 metres
- Materials: brick
- Designated as NHL

Iran National Heritage List
- Official name: Mausoleum of Sheikh Haydar
- Type: Mausoleum
- Designated: 1932
- Reference no.: 184
- Conservation organization: Cultural Heritage, Handicrafts and Tourism Organization of Iran

The Tomb of Shaykh Haydar (Persian: آرامگاه شیخ حیدر) is located in the city of Meshginshahr, Iran. It was first built in the 14th century during the Ilkhanid era, and later served as a mausoleum for Shaykh Haydar, the father of Shah Ismail I. It is number 184 on the list of Iranian national heritage monuments.

== History ==
Shaykh Haydar, a leader of the militaristic Safavid Sufi movement, was killed in a battle in Tabasaran in the year 1460, and only his severed head was buried in Tabriz. The rest of his remains were buried in Meshginshahr, and a tomb was said to have been built over his grave there. However, an inscription found during an archeological investigation dates the construction of the tomb to the final years of the reign of the Ilkhani ruler, Abu Sa'id Bahadur Khan. This predates the birth of Shaykh Haydar who was born in the year 1459, and by then the Ilkhanate had been dissolved, with only the Aq Qoyunlu ruling Iran at the time. The place was known as an Imamzadeh many years before his burial.

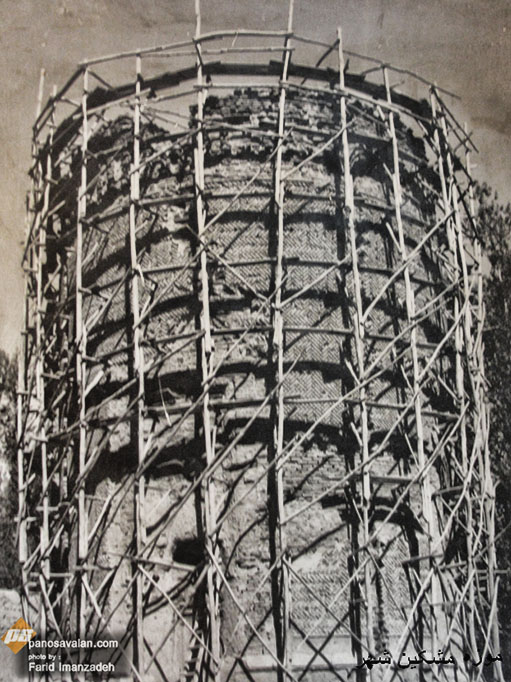
A historical image of Shaykh Haydar's tomb before modern restoration. Note the support structures required to prevent the mausoleum tower from collapsing

Later in the early 16th century, Shaykh Haydar's son, Shah Ismail, transferred his remains to Ardabil, and entombed them in the Sheikh Safi al-Din Khānegāh and Shrine Ensemble. Hence, the current tomb in Meshginshahr is only a symbolic monument, and not the actual grave of Shaykh Haydar itself. Tiling works were completed during the Safavid era, while the building was restored in modern times and there is now a mosque, as well as several houses and facilities built around it.

== Architecture ==
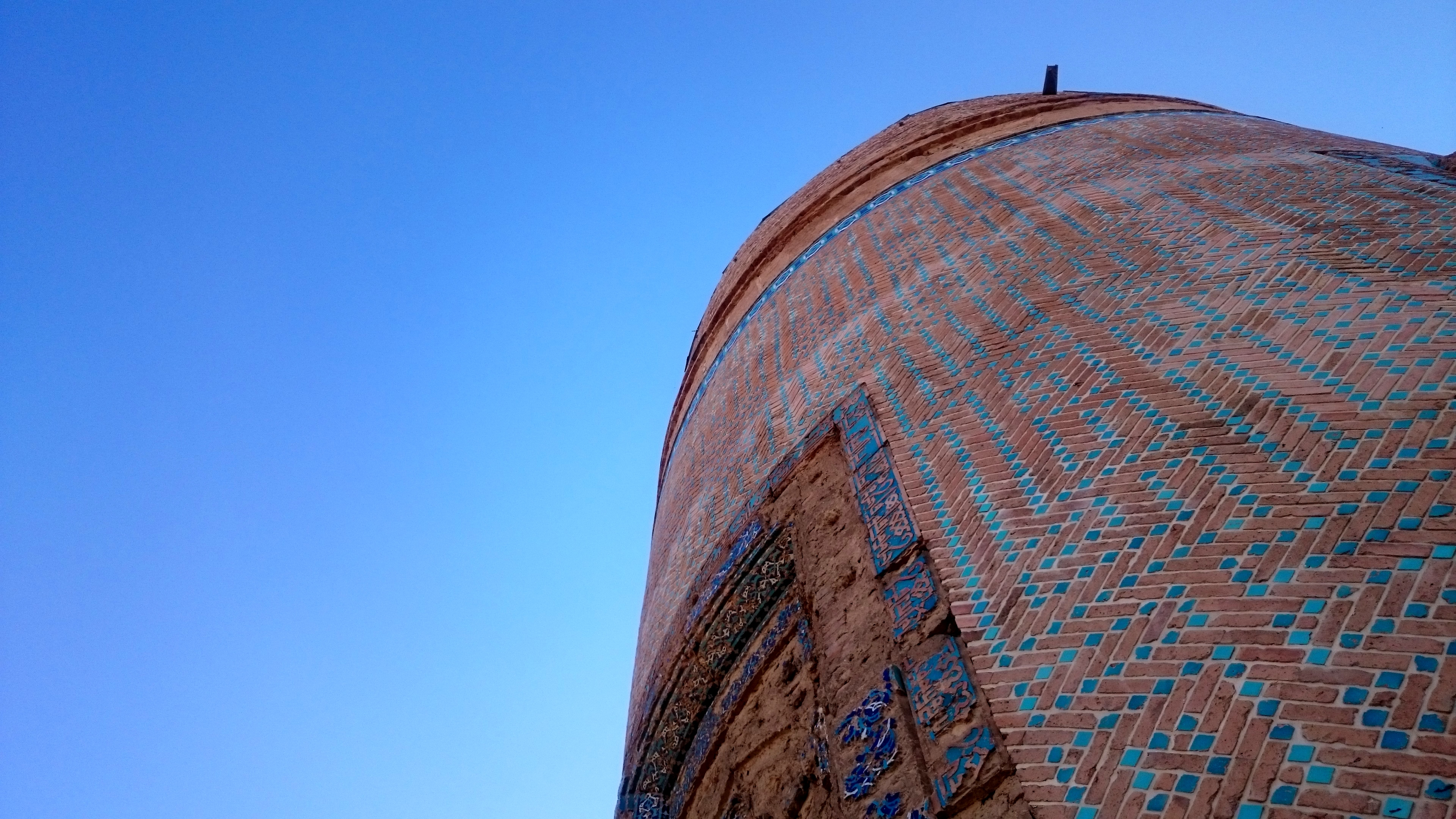
A closeup of the decorative tiling on the exterior surface of the mausoleum

The mausoleum, made out of brick, is octagonal in shape, and has twelve sides. It is 18.5 metres tall, with a width of 10.5 metres. Decorative calligraphy on the outside of the mausoleum, dating back to the Safavid era and using tiles, reveals the words Jalal-Allah and an inscribed version of the Al-Fatiha. The octagonal mausoleum is built on top of a stone platform which is situated in the center of the courtyard of the remains of a larger complex.

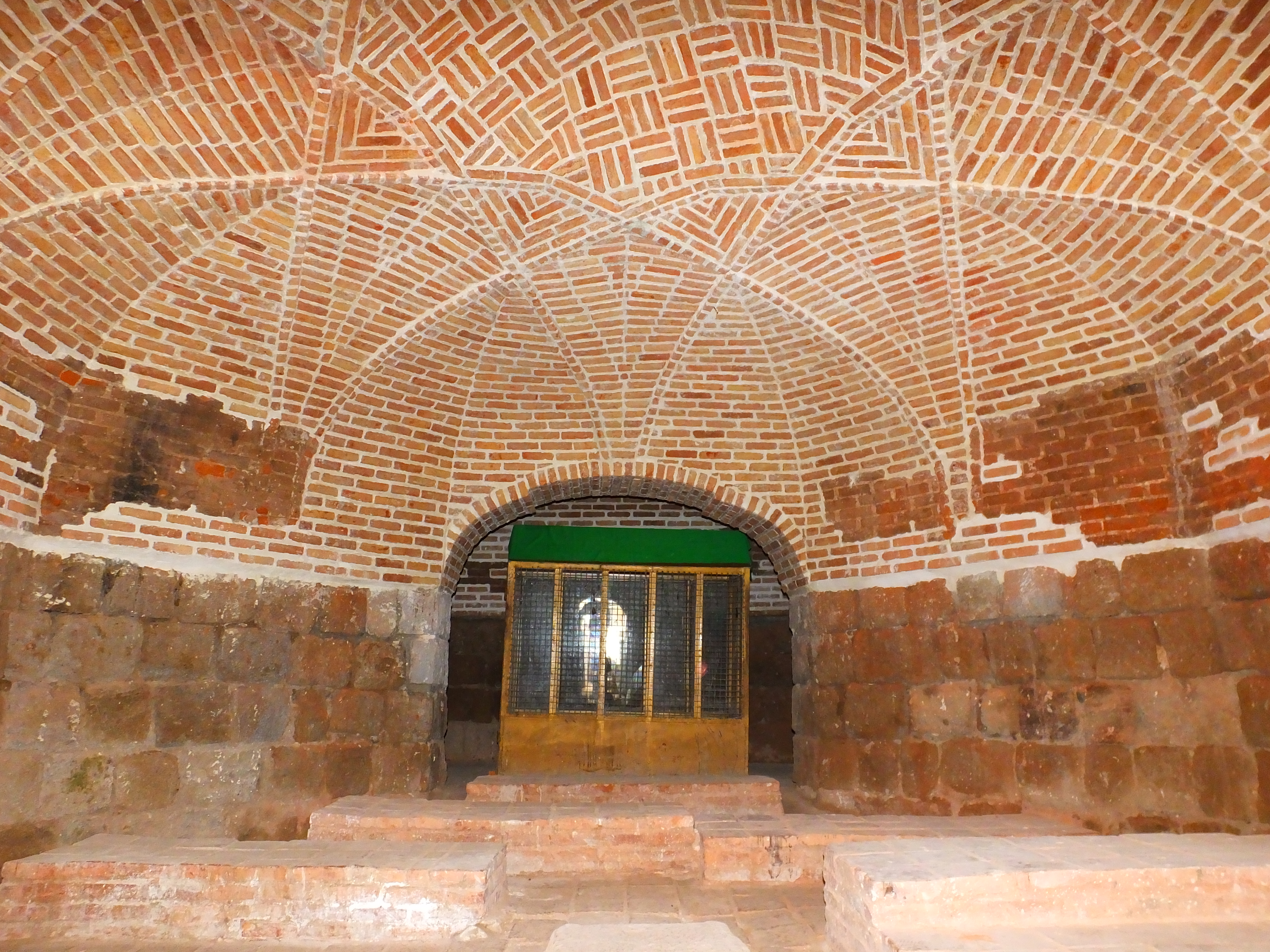
The crypt, with Shaykh Haydar's tomb in the center of another room

Inside the mausoleum, one has to enter a crypt to access the tomb of Shaykh Haydar. There are seven graves in the crypt. Six of them are located in the main part of the crypt, but the grave of Shaykh Haydar is in the center of a room attached to the crypt, enclosed by a zarih.

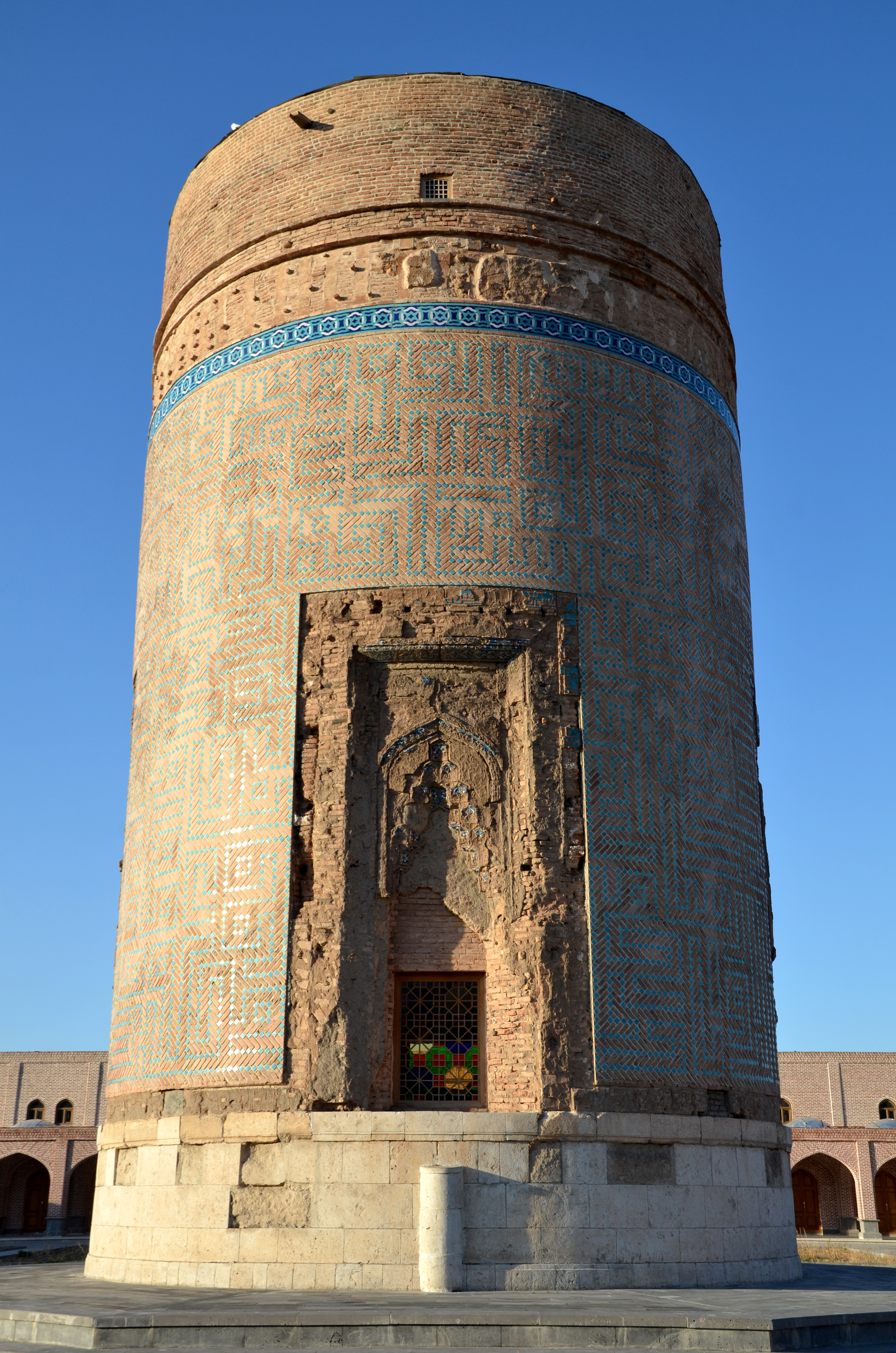
Historic stone work at the tomb's crypt

== See also ==
- Sheikh Safi al-Din Khānegāh and Shrine Ensemble
- List of mausoleums in Iran
