= Meshginshahr (electoral district) =

Constituency of the Iranian parliament

- Electoral district constituency for the Ardabil
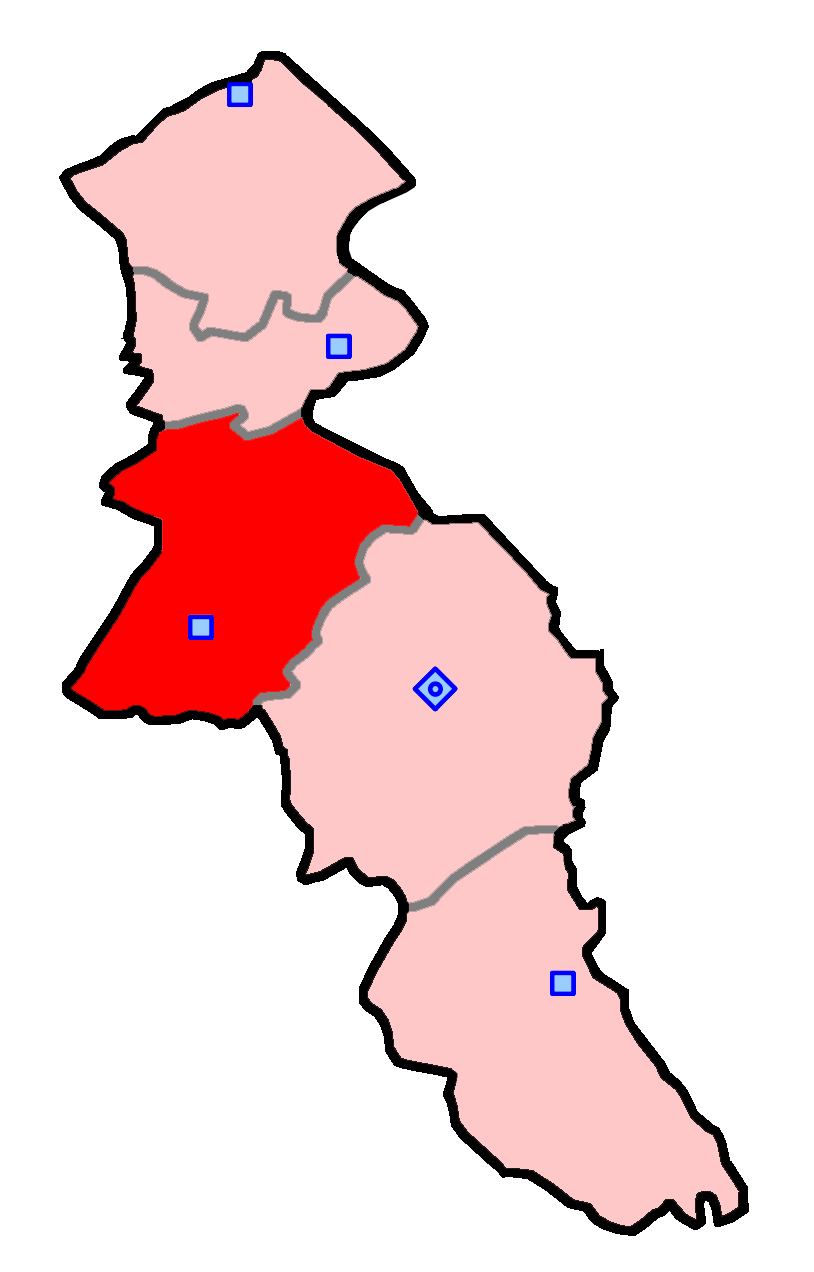
- Meshginshahr shown within Ardabil Province
- Ardabil Province: Meshgin Shahr County

Current constituency
- Assembly Members: Vali Maleki

Meshginshahr (electoral district) is the 3rd electoral district in the Ardabil Province of Iran. It has a population of 151,156 and elects 1 member of parliament.

== 1980 ==
MP in 1980 from the electorate of Meshginshahr. (1st)

- Ahmad Hemmati

== 1984 ==
MP in 1984 from the electorate of Meshginshahr. (2nd)

- Ahmad Hemmati

== 1988 ==
MPs in 1988 from the electorate of Meshginshahr. (3rd)

- Ahmad Hemmati

== 1992 ==
MP in 1992 from the electorate of Meshginshahr. (4th)

- Ahmad Hemmati

== 1996 ==
MP in 1996 from the electorate of Meshginshahr. (5th)

- Mahmud Norizadeh

== 2000 ==
MP in 2000 from the electorate of Meshginshahr. (6th)

- Khalil Aghaei

== 2004 ==
MPs in 2004 from the electorate of Meshginshahr. (7th)

- Vali Maleki

== 2008 ==
MP in 2008 from the electorate of Meshginshahr. (8th)

- Younes Asadi

== 2012 ==
MP in 2012 from the electorate of Meshginshahr. (9th)

- Younes Asadi

== 2016 ==
2016 Iranian legislative election
#	Candidate	List(s)	Votes	%
	Vali Maleki	Independent politician	22,457	
