= Khadija Begum =

Aq Qoyunlu princess

- Spouse: Shaykh Junayd
- Issue: Shaykh Haydar
- Dynasty: Aq Qoyunlu
- Father: Ali Aq Qoyunlu
- Mother: Sara Khatun

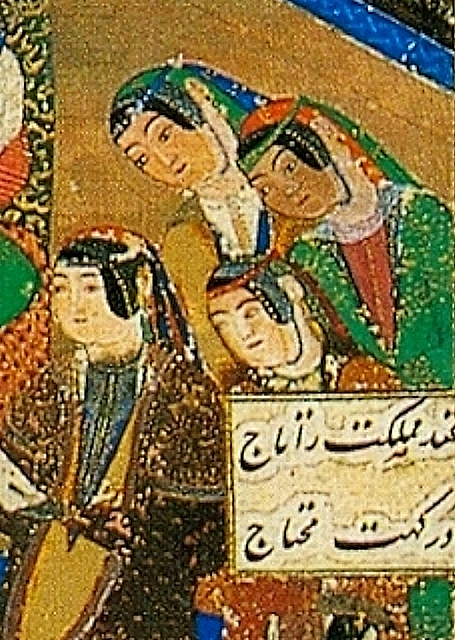
Court ladies at the Aq Qoyunlu court of Yaqub Aq Qoyunlu in Tabriz (painted by Shaykhi in 1475–1482)

Khadija Begum, also Khadija Khatun or Khadija Beyim Khatun, was an Aq Qoyunlu princess and the daughter of the Aq Qoyunlu ruler Ali Aq Qoyunlu and his wife Sara Khatun, and was the sister of the famous Aq Qoyunlu ruler Uzun Hasan.

Sometime between 1456 and 1459, she married Shaykh Junayd, hereditary leader of the Safavid order and grandfather of the future founder of the Safavid Empire Shah Ismail, marking the establishment of a close genealogical connection between the Aq Qoyunlu and the Safavids. They were married before Shaykh Junayd's invasion of Trebizond. Shaykh Junayd would die not long after the marriage, on 4 March 1460, killed in the Battle of Tabasaran.

Her son was Shaykh Haydar, who himself married an Aq Qoyunlu princess Alamshah Halime Begum, a union out of which was born Shah Ismail.

== Sources ==
- Ghereghlou, Kioumars (2016). "ḤAYDAR ṢAFAVI". Encyclopaedia Iranica.
