= Pir Ali Bayandur =

Pir Ali

Leader of the Aq Qoyunlu
- Reign: – 1413
- Successor: Piltan b. Pir Ali
- Died: c. 1413
- Spouse: a daughter of Ahmad b. Qutlu
- Issue: Piltan; Nur 'Ali; Musa; Sara Khatun
Names
- Pir Ali Bayandur
- Dynasty: Aq Qoyunlu
- Father: Fakhr ad-Din Qutlu
- Mother: Maria Comnene of Trebizond

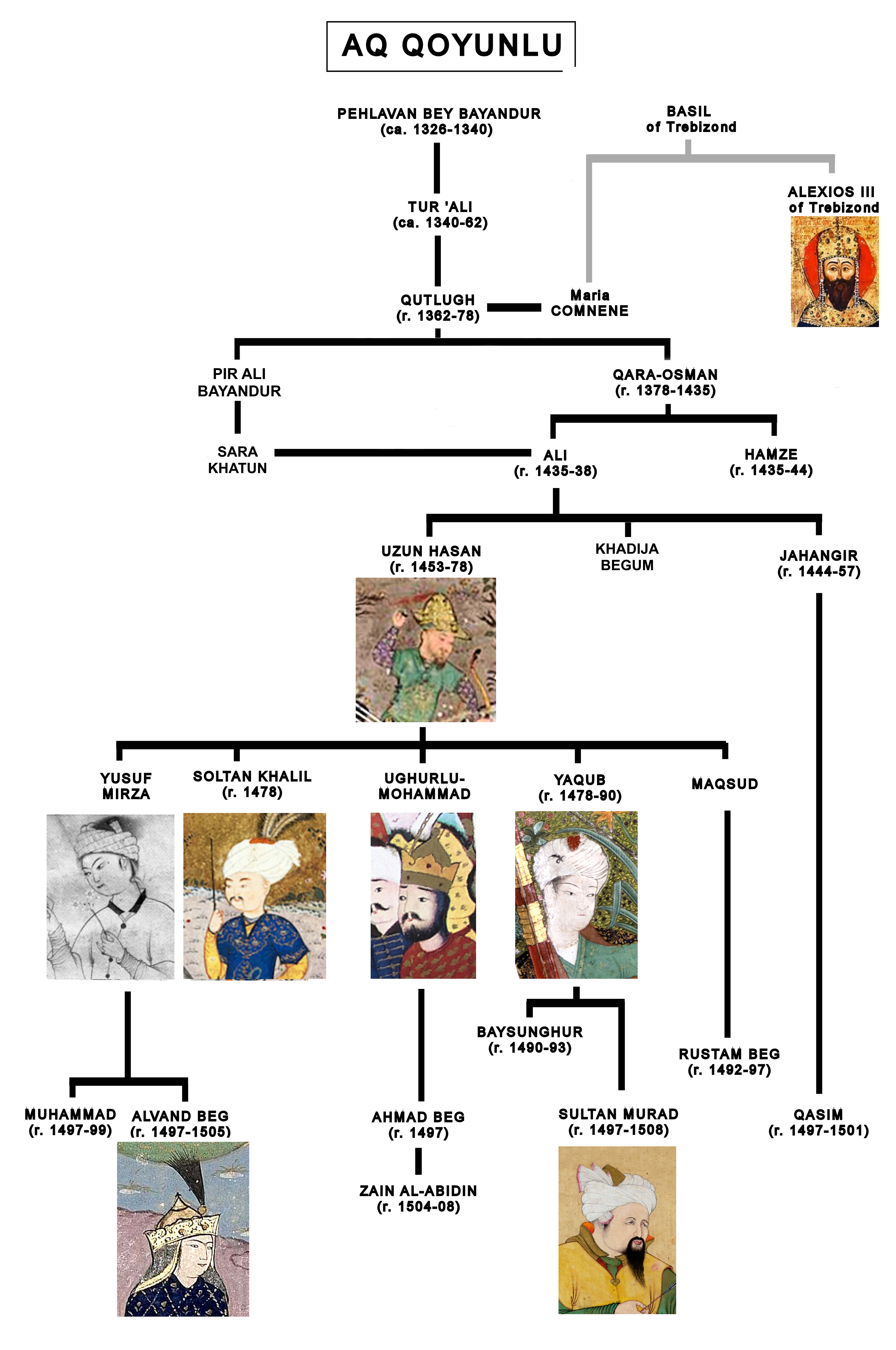
Genealogy of the Aq Qoyunlu dynasty

Pir Ali Bayandur was a ruler of the Aq Qoyunlu in the area of Kiğı, where he had his summer encampment in Arminiya. Pir Ali was a son of the Aq Qoyunlu ruler Fakhr ad-Din Qutlu by his Pontic wife Maria Comnena, sister of Alexios III of Trebizond.

His wife was one of his nieces, a daughter of Ahmad b. Qutlu. He had several sons, and a daughter named Sara Khatun, who married Ali Aq Qoyunlu, and became the mother of Uzun Hasan.

Pir Ali was allied with Timur in the offensive against the Ottomans in 1402–03. Later, his son Piltan was involved in the pillage of Timur's spoils of war, which led to their imprisonment by Timur. Pir Ali was later released, and returned to his dominion in Kiğı, where he died circa 1413.

His son Piltan succeeded him in Kiğı, under the suzerainty of Qara Osman.

== Sources ==
- Woods, John E. (1999). The Aqquyunlu: Clan, Confederation, Empire. University of Utah Press.
