= Fakhr al-Din Qutlugh =

Beg of Aq Qoyunlu from 1362 to 1389

- Bey
- Reign: 1362-1389
- Predecessor: Bey Tur-Ali
- Successor: Qara Yuluk Uthman Beg
- Died: 1389; Diyarbakır
- Spouse: Maria Komnene; Possibly other wives.
- Dynasty: Aq Qoyunlu
- Father: Bey Tur-Ali

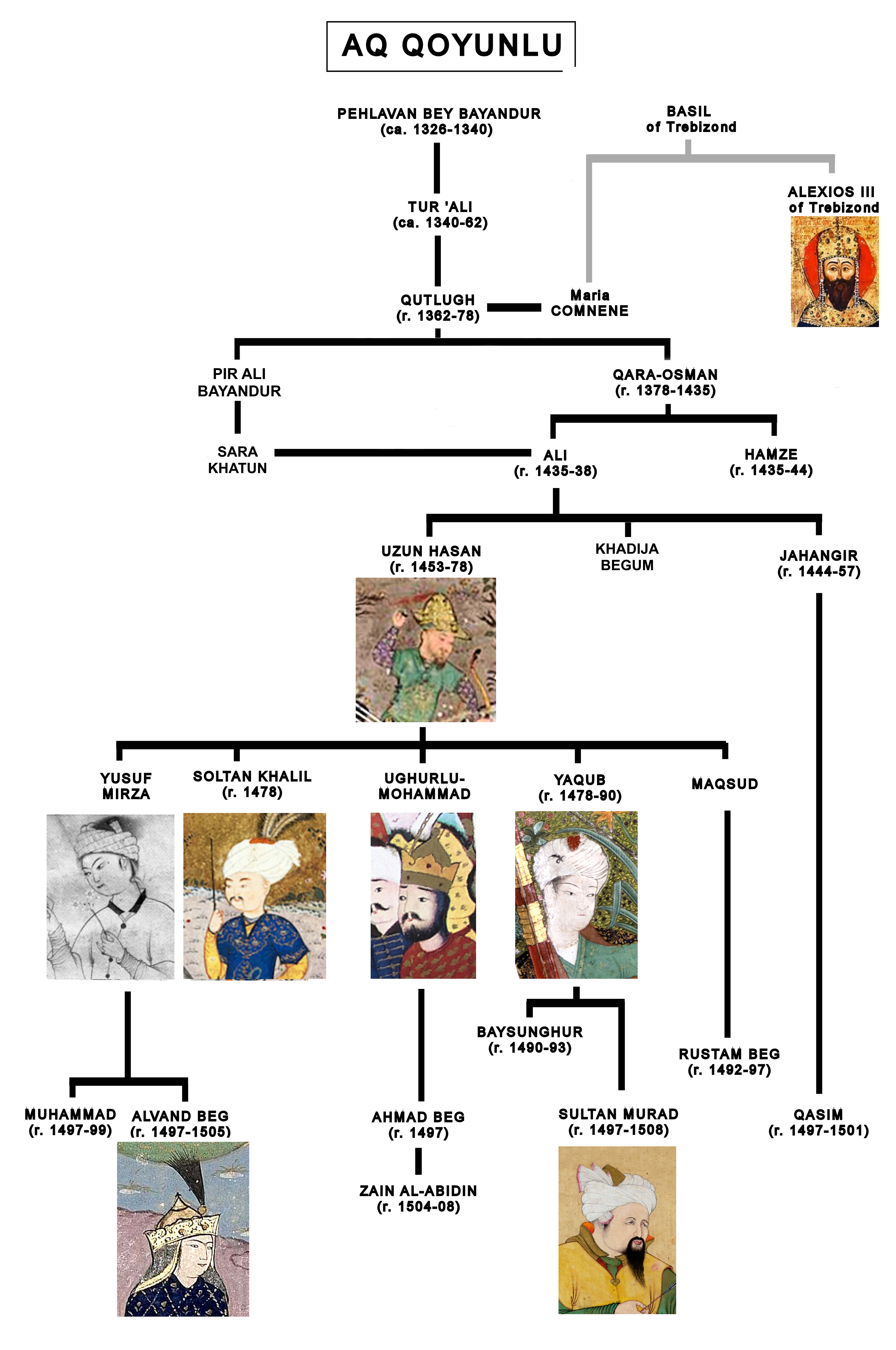
Genealogy of the Aq Qoyunlu dynasty

Fakhr al-Din Qutlugh-bey (فخر الدین قتلغ بیگ; died 1389) was the second Aq Qoyunlu bey, ruling from 1362 to 1389. His full name was Haji Fakhr al-Din Kutlug ibn Tur Ali-bey.

== Biography ==
Qutlugh was the son and successor of Bey Tur-Ali and grandson of Pehlavan bey Bayandur. In his youth he spent time at the court of Ghiyath al-Din Muhammad I, Bey of Eretna (1352–1366). In 1352, Qutlugh married Maria Komnene (Despina Khatun), sister of the Emperor of Trebizond, Alexios III, as part of the peace agreement between the Aq Qoyunlu and Trebizond. Around 1363, after the death of his father, Qutlugh became the new Bey of the Aq Qoyunlu. Under Qutlugh, the Aq Qoyunlu expanded south of Erzincan. He attempted to maintain good relations with Trebizond, visiting there with his wife in 1365. In 1379, he sent his oldest son, Ahmad, to Erzincan to assist Mutahharten against the military incursions of the Eretnids under sultan Ala al-Din Ali. Following the death of Ala al-Din Ali in 1381, Qutlugh supported the semi-autonomous lords of Erzincan.

== Alliances ==
Qutlugh focused his main efforts on transforming the tribal union into a more solid state formation. At the same time, he made an alliance with the Jalayirid Sultanate against the tribal union Kara Koyunlu, which was defeated in 1366. However, in the end he quarreled with the Jalayrids because of their establishment of an alliance with the state Kara Koyunlu.

During the 1370s, in alliance with Jalayirid Sultanate and Golden Horde Qutlugh fought against Kara Koyunlu. However, in 1386 in the battle of Erzincan he was defeated by Kara Muhammad, beg Kara Koyunlu. Then Qutlugh made an alliance with the Central Asian commander Tamerlane, who set out on Tabriz and Azerbaijan. He was allied with him against Jalairids and Kara Koyunlu.

In 1389, Qutlugh died under unknown circumstances. After that, a power struggle began between his sons Osman and Ahmad, which was joined by another brother, Pir Ali.

== Marriage and issue ==
Qutlugh and Maria had:

- Ahmad
- Pir Ali
- Qara Usman (likely)
- Husayn
- unnamed daughter married Salim Doger

== Legacy ==
Qutlugh expanded the borders of the Aq Qoyunlu to south of Erzincan into Diyarbakr. It was under his reign that the term "Aq Qoyunlu" is first referenced in Burhan al-Din of Sivas' chronicle. Qutlugh had made the pilgrimage to Mecca, and was given the title "al-Hajj". He also founded a mosque in Sinir.

== Sources ==
- Roemer, H.R. (1986). "The Türkmen Dynasties". In Lockhart, Laurence; Jackson, Peter (eds.). The Cambridge History of Iran: The Timurid and Safavid Periods. Vol. 6. Cambridge: Cambridge University Press. ISBN 0-521-20094-6.
- Woods, John E. (1999). The Aqquyunlu: Clan, Confederation, Empire. The University of Utah Press.
