= Bey Tur-Ali =

- Bey
- Reign: 1340 - 1362
- Predecessor: Pehlavan bey Bayandur
- Successor: Fakhr al-Din Qutlugh
- Died: 1362; Diyarbakır
- Dynasty: Aq Qoyunlu
- Father: Pehlavan bey Bayandur

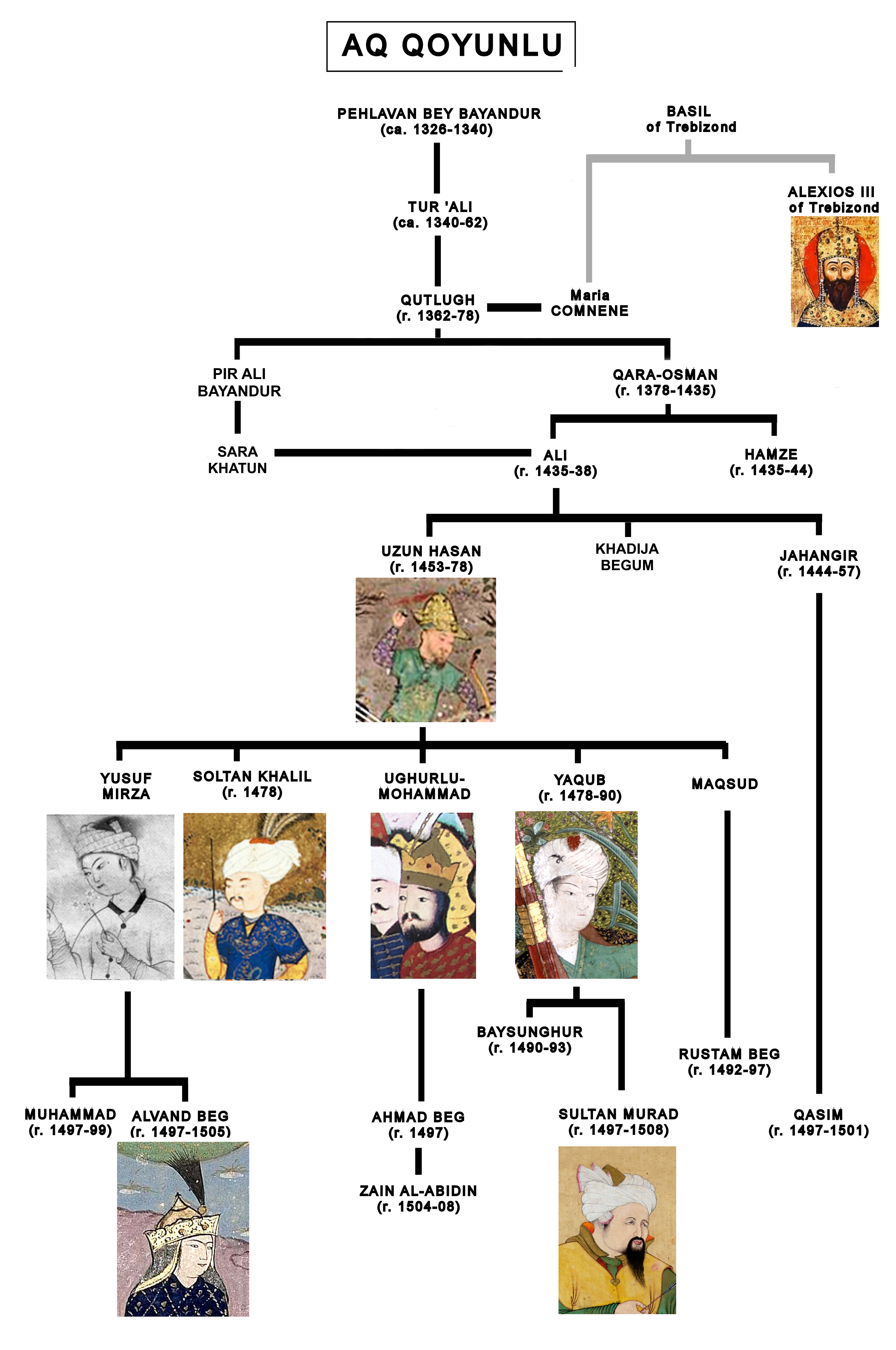
Genealogy of the Aq Qoyunlu dynasty

Bey Tur-Ali, also Aladdin Turali Bey was the second ruler of Aq Qoyunlu state.

== Life ==
He was a son of Pehlavan bey Bayandur, who for the first time had settled the Bayandur tribe in Diyarbakir region.

Turali Bey succeeded his father in 1340 and remained in power until 1362.
