= Younes Asadi =

Iranian politician

- یونس اسدی

member of Islamic Consultative Assembly
- In office 2008–2016
- Constituency: Meshginshahr (electoral district)

Personal details
- Born: 1963 (age 62–63) Meshginshahr, Iran
- Party: Iranian reform movement
- Education: Allameh Tabataba'i University

Younes Asadi (Persian: ‌‌یونس اسدی; born 1963) is an Iranian politician.

Asadi was born in Meshginshahr, Ardabil Province. He is a member of the 8th and 9th Islamic Consultative Assembly from the electorate of Meshginshahr. and member of Iran-Azerbaijan Friendship society. Asadi won with 26,109 (31.00%) votes.
