= Shaykh Junayd =

In Sufism, fifth leader of the Safavid order

5th Sheikh of the Safavid order
- In office ?–1460
- Preceded by: Khvajeh Ali Safavi→Shaykh Ibrahim
- Succeeded by: Shaykh Haydar

Personal details
- Died: 4 March 1460
- Spouse: Khadija Begum
- Children: Shaykh Haydar; Khvajeh Mohammad Safavi; Khvajeh Jamshid Safavi; Shah Pasha Khatun
- Parent: Shaykh Ibrahim

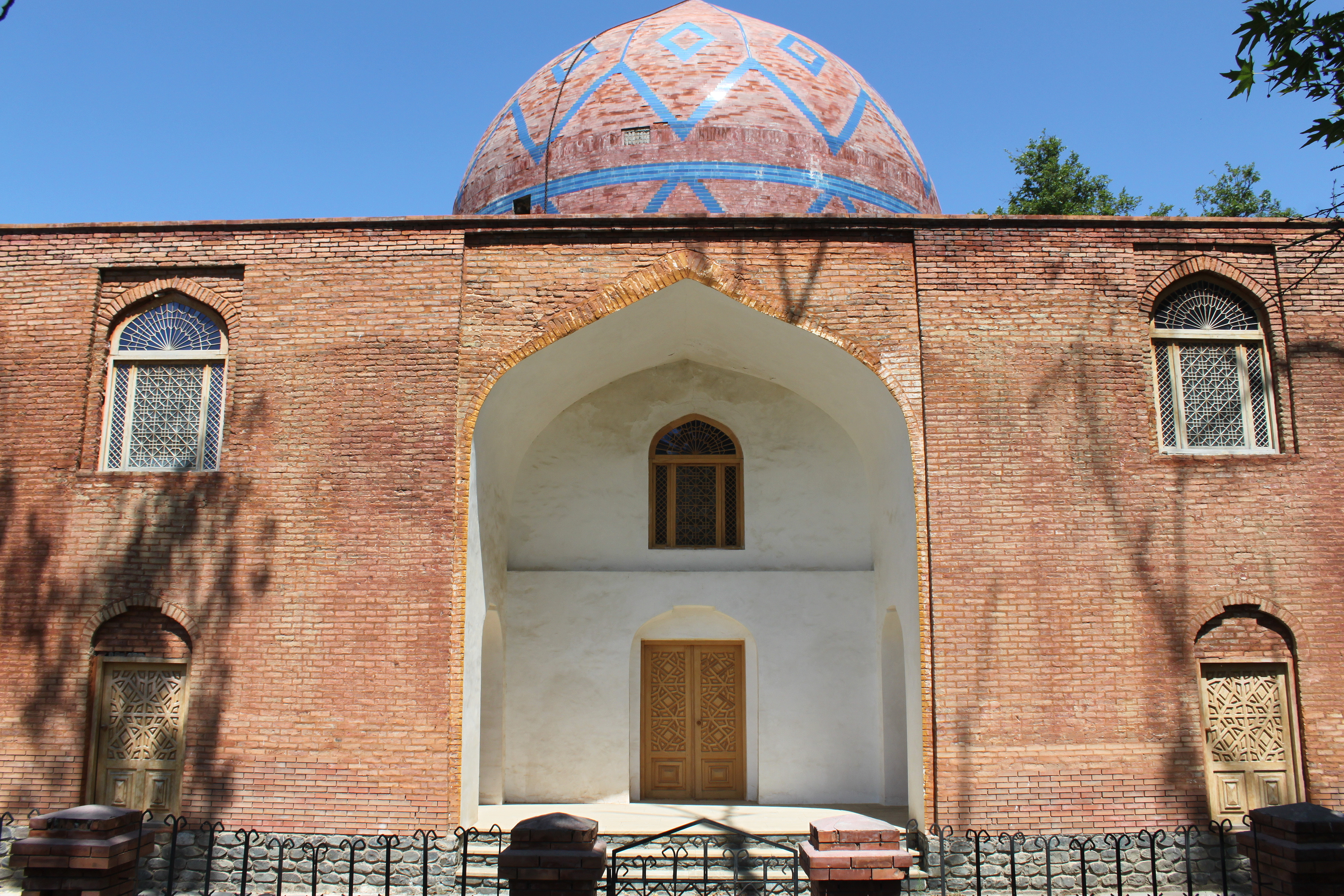
Mausoleum of Shaykh Junayd.

Shaykh Junayd (died 4 March 1460; Persian: شیخ جنید) was the hereditary leader of the Safavid order, a Sufi order based in Ardabil in northwestern Iran. He was the son of Shaykh Ibrahim and the grandson of Khvajeh Ali Safavi. He was the father of Shaykh Haydar and the grandfather of Shah Ismail I, the founder of the Safavid dynasty. Following his father's death, he led the Safavid order from 1447 to 1460. He transformed the order into a military movement, seeking to establish his own principality through conquest.

== History ==
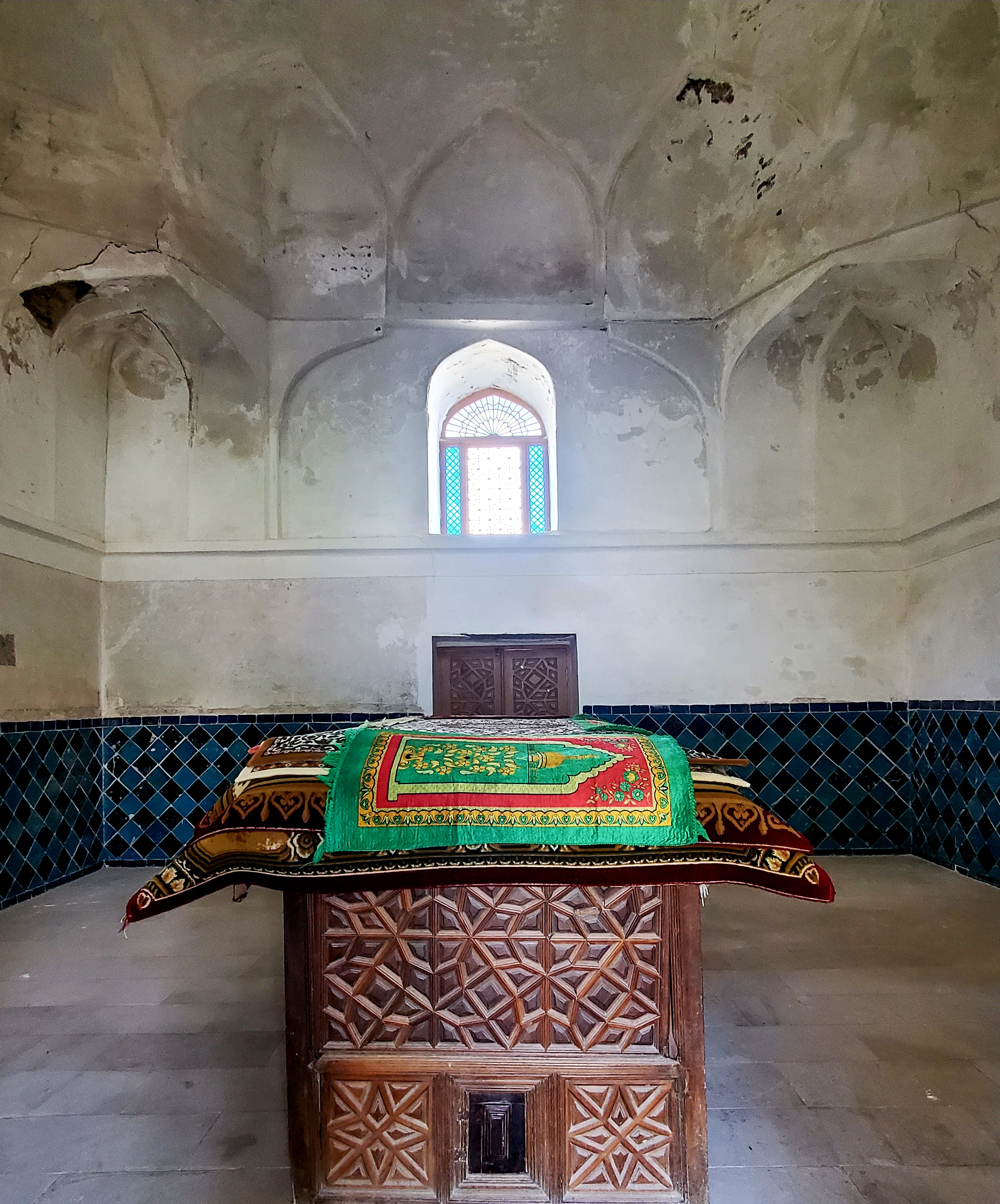
Casket of Shaykh Junayd

Under Junayd, the Safaviyya was transformed from a Sufi order organized around a saint-ascetic into an active military movement with a policy of conquest and domination. He was the first Safavi spiritual leader to espouse specifically Shia Islamic teachings, and in particular those of the Twelver ghulat. Junayd was viewed as a divine incarnation by his followers.

During his time in Ardabil, Junayd attracted so many disciples that in 1448, Jahan Shah (the Kara Koyunlu prince) drove him into exile to Anatolia and Syria. While there, he engaged in missionary activities and accumulated Turkmen followers. He then went to the court of Uzun Hassan at Diyarbakır, where he married Uzun Hassan's sister, Khadija Khatun, somewhere between 1456 and 1459.

Junayd was prevented from returning to Ardabil, so he lived at Shirvan where he died in a local skirmish near the Samur River in what is modern Azerbaijan, where he was buried. This led to the beginning of animosity between the mainly Sunni Shirvanshah and the increasingly heterodox Shi’i Safaviyya.

Mausoleum of Shaykh Juneyd is located in the village of Khazra in Azerbaijan. Junayd was succeeded by his son Shaykh Haydar, who married his cousin Halima Alamshah Khatun, daughter of Uzun Hassan and Theodora Despina Khatun. They had three sons and three daughters. One of them was Shah Ismail I, father of Shah Tahmasp I.

== Succession ==
Leaders of the Safaviyya:
Preceded by Sh. Ali Safavi (d. 1427) >> Sh. Ibrahim Safavi (d. 1447) >>
| Shaykh Junayd 1447–1460 | Succeeded by Sh. Haydar Safavi |

== See also ==
- Safavid dynasty
- Safavid dynasty family tree
