= Despina Khatun =

Daughter of the Emperor of Trebizond

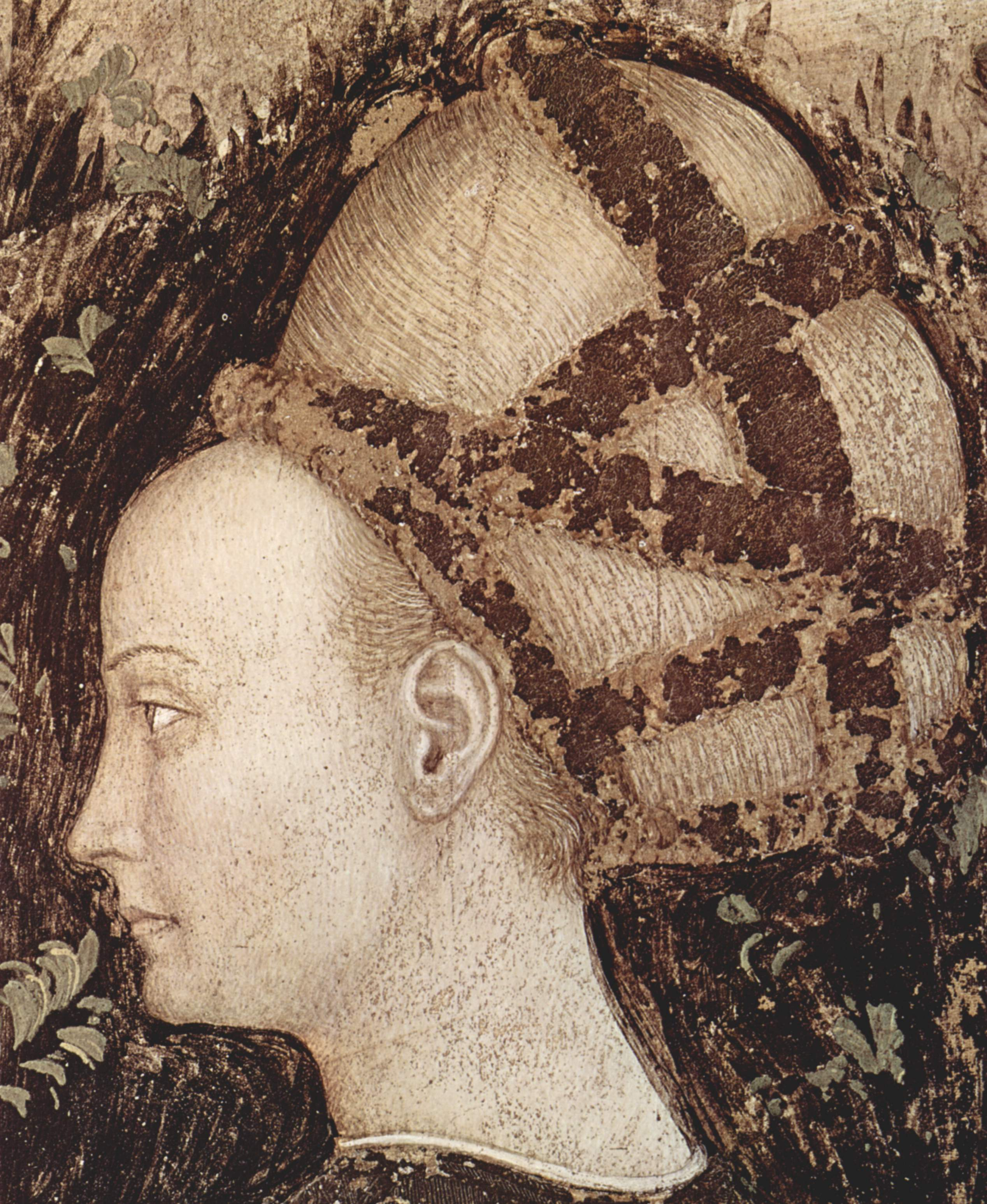
- Possible contemporary portrait of Theodora ("Despina Khantun") wife of Uzun Hasan, or alternatively her aunt Maria Komnene, by Pisanello (detail).

Queen consort of Aq Qoyunlu
- Tenure: 1458–after 1474
- Born: After 1438
- Died: After 1474
- Burial: St. George's church, Diyarbakır, Turkey
- Spouses: Uzun Hassan (m. 1458)
- Issue: Maqsud Beg; Halima Alamshah Khatun; Two other daughters
- Dynasty: Komnenos (by birth); Aq Qoyunlu (by marriage)
- Father: John IV of Trebizond

Theodora Megale Komnene (Greek: Θεοδώρα Μεγάλη Κομνηνή; fl. 1438 – c. 1474), also known as Despina Khatun (Persian: دسپینا خاتون; from the Greek title despoina and Turco-Mongol title khatun, both meaning "lady"), was the daughter of John IV of Trebizond. She married the Aq Qoyunlu ruler Uzun Hasan in 1458. She became the mother of Halima Alamshah Hatun who became the mother of first Safavid king, Shah Ismail I.

Some older writers refer to her as "Catherine". Charles Diehl has shown that it was based on Du Cange’s misunderstanding of the Turkic title "Khatun" as "Catherine".

John IV agreed to the marriage only if his daughter was allowed to continue her Orthodox Christian religion, a condition which Uzun Hasan agreed upon. Despina was famous for her extreme beauty amongst the Greek women. She was accompanied by a group of Orthodox Christian priests and was allowed to build Orthodox churches in Iran. Uzun Hasan strengthened his anti-Ottoman alliance by this marriage and gained the support of many Greeks, Armenians, and Georgians.

Marriage between Christians and Muslim rulers, although uncommon, was not unprecedented. Speros Vryonis provides several examples from the Sultanate of the Seljuk Turks, beginning with Kilij Arslan II. A later example is Michael VIII Palaiologos marrying off his illegitimate daughters Euphrosyne and Maria to Nogai Khan and Abaqa Khan respectively. Previous Emperors of Trebizond had married off their female relatives, most notably Alexios III, during whose reign two of his sisters and two of his daughters were married to rulers of neighboring Muslim states.

In Western Europe, Theodora inspired the myth of the "Princess of Trebizond", a fixture of tales of damsels in distress as well as of a possible grand Crusade against the Ottoman Turks. The legend inspired several artists, including Pisanello and Jacques Offenbach.

== Early life ==
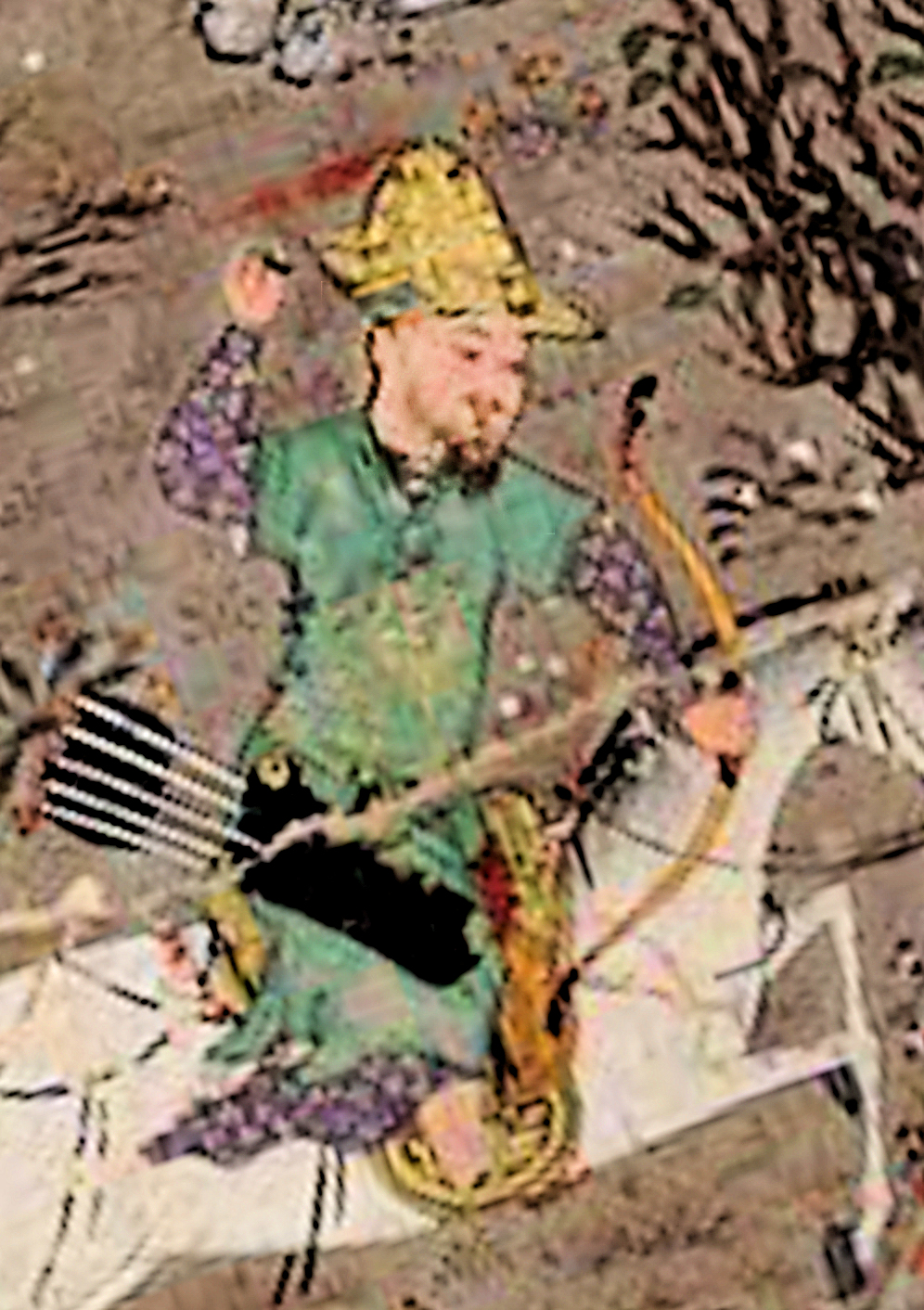
Uzun Hasan, Aq Qoyunlu husband of Despina Khatun, 1460s–1470s.

Theodora was the daughter of John IV of Trebizond but her mother's identity is disputed. Some sources suggest that her mother was John’s first wife, a Bagrationi princess and daughter of King Alexander I of Georgia while others believe she was his second wife, the daughter of a Turkish ruler.

John’s first wife probably died in Georgia before 1429. The Spanish traveler Pero Tafur wrote that John IV was married to a Turkish ruler’s daughter when he visited Trebizond in 1438. Since Theodora Despina Khatun is believed to have been born after 1438, it is thought that her mother was John’s second wife, the daughter of a Turkish ruler.

Theodora was married to Uzun Hasan, Khan of the Turkoman tribe of Aq Qoyunlu; her uncle David gave her away at the marriage.

== Political marriage ==
At the time of marriage, the Empire of her father John faced a serious threat. Constantinople had fallen to the Ottoman sultan, Mehmet II in 1453. In 1456, Mehmet ordered his governor Chetir, to capture Trebizond; the attack failed, but John was forced to pay tribute to Mehmet to prevent further attacks. Mehmet gradually annexed the last Palaiologian possessions in the Morea, completing the task with the conquest of Mistra on 29 May 1460. An alliance with the powerful Aq Qoyunlu tribe, who were the Ottomans' most powerful rival, appeared more than beneficial.

Trebizond and the Aq Qoyunlu had a history of co-operation, for they had concluded a political marriage in the past: Theodora's great-great aunt had married Qara Osman, emir of the Aq Qoyunlu. Theodora was famed for her beauty. An unknown Venetian traveller wrote, "it was common opinion that there was at that time no woman of greater beauty; and throughout all Persia the fame of her great beauty and supreme charm spread." Uzun Hassan eagerly agreed to be the protector of Trebizond, as well as making other concessions, in return for Theodora's hand. News of Theodora as the Princess of Trebizond who was married to the powerful Uzun Hassan spread to the West, and helped to foster stories of Princess of Trebizond.

However this alliance failed to help John's successor, his brother David. Mehmed II, the Ottoman ruler, marched on the imperial city of Trebizond in 1461. Uzun Hassan initially supported the Trapuzentines, but he was persuaded by the Ottomans to abandon Trebizond after the failed mediation of his mother, Sara Khatun. After securing the eastern border, Mehmed attacked Trebizond, which surrendered 15 August 1461, ending the polity.

== Late life ==
After the fall of Trebizond, David was put in house arrest. In 1463, David was discovered attempting to send a secret letter to Theodora, which gave Mehmed II the needed excuse to get rid of David once and for all. He considered this letter a conspiracy to recapture the land of Trebizond with the help of Aq Qoyunlu and had David, his sons and his nephew executed on 1 November 1463.

Despite the death of her uncle, Theodora continued to influence her husband in foreign affairs. According to Anthony Bryer, she was the moving force behind diplomatic overtures to Venice in 1465–1466, and to Stephen III of Moldavia in 1474. When the Venetian diplomat Caterino Zeno came to the court of Uzun Hassan in 1473, one of the first persons he met was Theodora. He revealed to the woman that they were related, and on the basis of this she provided him unparalleled access to her and Uzun Hassan during his stay. Franz Babinger states she was present at the Battle of Otlukbeli (1473), where she urged her husband to pursue the defeated army of Mehmed II in order to utterly destroy him.

After the death of Uzun Hassan in 1478, not much is known about her. She was buried at St. Georges Church in Diyarbakr, where her tomb was shown to an Italian visitor in 1507. However the structure was damaged in 1883 and no longer can be seen.

== Family ==
By Uzun Hasan, Theodora Despina had one son and three daughters:

- Maqsud Beg (1458 - 1478). Executed by his half-brother Khalil in 1478.
- Halima Alamshah Khatun (1460–1522). She married her cousin Shaykh Haydar (son of Khadija Khatun, sister of her father, and Shaykh Junayd) in 1471/1472. They had three son and four daughters. One of them was Shah Ismail I, founder of Safavid Empire and father of Shah Tahmasp I. She was called Martha in Christian sources.
- Two other daughters whom Caterino Zeno met in Damascus in 1473 together their mother, where they conversed in Pontic Greek. One of them married Abd al-Baqi bin Muhammad Baqir Miranshahi, the other married Bayram Beg Qaramanlu.

== See also ==
- Safavid dynasty family tree
- List of the mothers of the Safavid Shahs
- Pontic Greeks
- Saint George and the Princess of Trebizond by Pisanello.

== Bibliography ==
- Bierbrier, M.L. (1997). "The Descendants of Theodora Comnena of Trebizond". The Genealogist. 11 (2). Picton Press.
