= Pehlavan bey Bayandur =

13th-century Bayandur castellan

Pehlavan Bey Bayandur
- Other names: Pahlavan Beg; possibly Muhammad
- Occupation: Castellan of Alinjaq
- Years active: 13th century
- Children: Tur Ali Beg
- Father: Azdi Beg

Pehlavan Bey Bayandur, also rendered Pahlavan Beg and possibly named Muhammad, was the founder and first chieftain of the Ağqoyunlu clan. From the later dynastic genealogy of the Aq Qoyunlu rulers, he appears as castellan of the fortress of Alinjaq.

== Life ==
According to the genealogy preserved by Abu Bakr Tihrani in the Kitab-i Diyarbakriyya, Pahlavan was a son of Azdi Beg and a grandson of Idris Beg II, (Note: The main text of Woods and the genealogy he reproduces both make Pahlavan the grandson of Idris Beg II; his accompanying endnote refers instead to "Idris III", a figure who does not appear in the genealogy, which lists only Idris Beg I and Idris Beg II.) whom the same genealogy describes as having ruled the Aq Qoyunlu in some of the castles and cantons of Diyar Bakr at the beginning of the thirteenth century. Pahlavan appears in it as the fifty-sixth of sixty-eight generations linking Adam to Qara Usman.

The Kitab-i Diyarbakriyya itself states that pahlavan ("champion") was an honorific conferred on him rather than his personal name; the Mamluk historian Maqrizi gives his name as Muhammad in al-Suluk. The historian John E. Woods notes the same usage in the Falakiya, where pahlavan precedes the names of several castellans of the Ilkhanid–Jalayirid period.

Later Aq Qoyunlu tradition describes Pahlavan as castellan of Alinjaq, near Nakhchivan. In the 1230s he was reportedly compelled to evacuate the fortress by Chormaghun, the Mongol governor of Azerbaijan and the Caucasus, and withdrew to western Anatolia, where he joined other Turkmen leaders in operations against the Byzantines near Bursa. He later returned to eastern Anatolia and settled near Amid in Diyar Bakr, where he was followed by his son Tur Ali, who succeeded him around the turn of the fourteenth century.

== Historicity ==
Because Pahlavan is known principally from a genealogy compiled after 1475, the details of his career are uncertain. That tradition places his evacuation of Alinjaq in the 1230s and his son's succession around 1300; Woods notes a comparable chronological difficulty in the same tradition's account of Tur Ali, who on its own dating would have been at least seventy when his dealings with the rulers of Trabzon began in the middle of the fourteenth century.

The Bayandur are not among the five Oghuz-Turkmen clans (the Döger, Afshar, Salur, Yiva and Qiniq) that Woods finds attested in contemporary narrative sources in the central Islamic lands before the Mongol invasions. The presence of the clan in Diyar Bakr and Arminiya is securely recorded only by the middle of the fourteenth century, by which time it had in all probability moved into the region in the wake of the demographic upheavals caused by the Mongol conquests a century earlier.

Woods regards Tur Ali, rather than Pahlavan, as the founder of the first Aq Qoyunlu dynastic "dispensation", a term he adopts in place of the historian Martin B. Dickson's "neo-eponymous clan".

== Sources ==
- Woods, John E. (1999). The Aqquyunlu: Clan, Confederation, Empire (Revised and expanded ed.). Salt Lake City: University of Utah Press. ISBN 0-87480-565-1.
