= Qasem Beg Hayati Tabrizi =

Qasem Beg Hayati Tabrizi (Persian: قاسم‌ بیگ حیاتی تبریزی) was a 16th-century historian in Safavid Iran, who is the author of the historical chronicle Tarikh, composed in 1554.

== Sources ==
- Ghereghlou, Kioumars Ghereghlou (2016). "Ḥayāti Tabrizi, Qāsem Beg". In Yarshater, Ehsan (ed.). Encyclopædia Iranica (Online ed.). Brill.
