= Khvajeh Ali Safavi =

Son of Sadr al-Dīn Mūsā

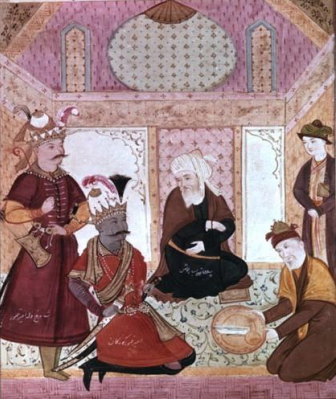
- Timur (left seated) meets Khvajeh Ali Safavi (center)

3rd Sheikh of the Safavid order
- In office 1391–1427
- Preceded by: Sadr al-Dīn Mūsā
- Succeeded by: →Sheikh Ebrahim→Shaykh Junayd

Personal details
- Died: 1427
- Children: Sheikh Ebrahim
- Parent: Sadr al-Dīn Mūsā (father)
- Relatives: Shaykh Junayd (grandson)

Khvajeh Ali Safavi (Persian: خواجه علی سیاهپوش; died 1427) was a son of Sadr al-Dīn Mūsā and grandson of Safi-ad-din Ardabili. He assumed leadership of the Safavid order after his father's death. According to Rudi Matthee / Encyclopedia Iranica, under Khvajeh Ali, the convictions of the Safavid order apparently shifted towards Shia Islam "under the influence of their main supporters—Turkmen tribes who adhered to a popular brand of Shiʿism". Originally (i.e. prior to Khvajeh Ali), the order seemingly bore "Sunni convictions".

== Sources ==
- Horst, H. (1985). "ʿALĪ, ḴᵛĀJA". Encyclopaedia Iranica, Vol. I, Fasc. 8. p. 836.
- Matthee, Rudi (2008). "Safavid Dynasty". Encyclopaedia Iranica.
- Newman, Andrew J. (2008). Safavid Iran: Rebirth of a Persian Empire. I.B.Tauris. ISBN 978-0-85771-661-3.
