= Shaykh Haydar =

Leader of the Safavid order (1460–1488)

Murshid Shaykh Ḥaydar Ṣafavi
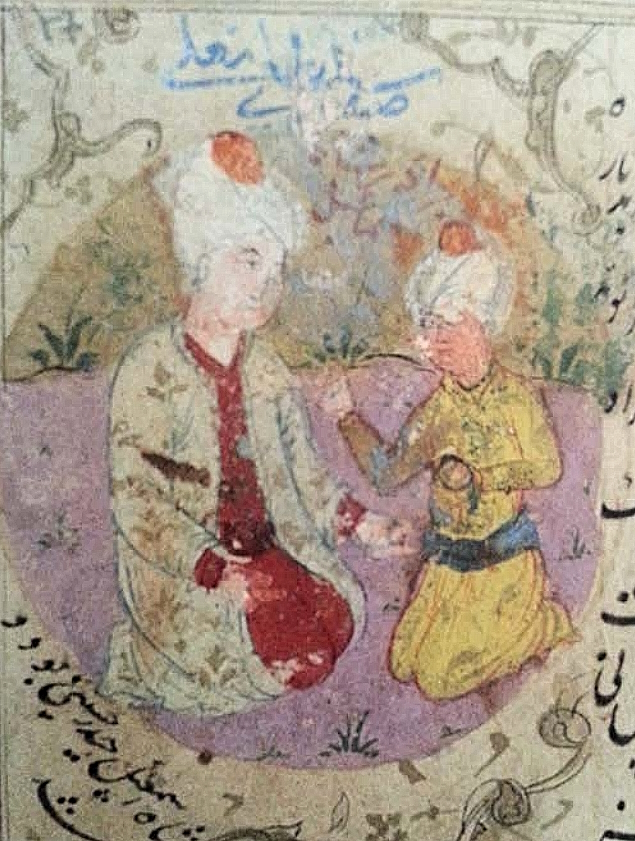
- Shaykh Haydar (left), and his son Sultan ʿAli Safavi (brother of Ismaʿil I, right). Cemʿ-i Tārīh, Museum of Ethnography, Ankara, No. 8457, fol. 17a.

6th Sheikh of the Safavid order
- In office 1460–1488
- Preceded by: Shaykh Junayd
- Succeeded by: Ali Mirza Safavi

Personal details
- Born: June–July 1459 Amid, Diyar Bakr (present-day Diyarbakır, Turkey)
- Died: 9 July 1488 (aged 28-29) Tabasaran, Dagestan (present-day Russia)
- Resting place: Tomb of Shaykh Haydar, Meshginshahr, Iran
- Spouse(s): Alamshah Halime Begum; A daughter of Farid al-din Jafar b. Khvajeh Ali
- Children: Ali Mirza Safavi; Ebrahim Mirza; Ismail I Fakhr-Jahan Khanum; Malek Khanum; Sayyed Hassan
- Parents: Shaykh Junayd (father); Khadija Begum (mother)
- Relatives: Khvajeh Mohammad Safavi (brother); Khvajeh Jamshid Safavi (brother); Shah Pasha Khatun (sister)

Shaykh Haydar or Sheikh Haydar (Persian: شیخ حیدر, romanized: Shaikh Ḥaidar; 1459–9 July 1488) was the successor of his father (Shaykh Junayd) as leader of the Safavid order from 1460 to 1488. Haydar maintained the policies and political ambitions initiated by his father. Under Sheikh Haydar, the order became crystallized as a political movement with an increasingly extremist heterodox Twelver Shi'i coloring and Haydar was viewed as a divine figure by his followers. Shaykh Haydar was responsible for instructing his followers to adopt the scarlet headgear of 12 gores commemorating The Twelve Imams, which led to them being designated by the Turkish term Qizilbash "Red Head".

Haydar soon came into conflict with the Shirvanshahs, as well as the Ak Koyunlu, who were allied to the former. Following several campaigns into the North Caucasus, mainly in Circassia and Dagestan, he and his men were eventually trapped in 1488 at Tabasaran by the combined forces of the Shirvanshah Farrukh Yassar and Ya'qub Beg of the Ak Koyunlu. In a pitched battled that ensued, Shaykh Haydar and his men were defeated and killed. He was succeeded by his son Soltan-Ali as leader of the order. Soltan-Ali was on his part succeeded by Haydar's younger son, who would become the founder of the Safavid dynasty, and known by his regnal name of Ismail I.

== Biography ==
Haydar was born in June–July 1459 in Amid (present-day Diyarbakır) in the province of Diyar Bakr to Shaykh Junayd and Khadija Begum, daughter of Qara Othman and sister of Uzun Hasan of the Ak Koyunlu. His parents had married on the eve of Shaykh Junayd's invasion of Trabzon. Less than a year later, Haydar's father was killed in the Battle of Tabasaran.

Apart from Haydar, the only sons of Junayd that had survived were Khvajeh Mohammad Safavi and Khvajeh Jamshid Safavi. Haydar's only surviving sister, Shah-Pasha Khatun, was married off to Mohammad Beg Talish, a pivotal figure in the foundation of the Safavid dynasty in the early 16th century. In 1469-70, Haydar was installed in Ardabil by his uncle Uzun Hassan, who had defeated Jahan Shah of Kara Koyunlu dynasty at the Battle of Chapakchur and established his own authority over its former domains. The Safavid order's return to Ardabil prompted an influx of Haydar’s followers from northern Syria and eastern Anatolia to Ardabil to be beside him.

Functioning as the "spiritual leader" of the order "tariqa", Haydar would engage into various alliances with the leaders of the Talish, Shirvan and southern Dagestan regions. Subsequently, he initiated three military campaigns against various rural areas and villages in the Northern Caucasus. According to Prof. Roger Savory, meant to drill his men, these raids targeted the "infidels" of Circassia and Dagestan. These were however probably the Christian Alans (nowadays better known as Ossetians) who roamed to the north of the Darial Pass as well as the Kabardian subgroup of Circassians. In order to reach the area, Haydar had to cross areas ruled by the Shirvanshah (specifically the Shirvanshah rulers of Salyan and Mahmudabad), who were hostile as they were allied to the Ak Koyunlu ruler of Azerbaijan, Sultan Ya'qub. Therefore, Haydar ordered for the production of boats in Khalkhal and Astara, in order to avoid having to go by land. By using boats, Haydar and his men would be able to circumvent the Shirvanshahs, reaching Derbent and coastal Dagestan through the Caspian Sea. In particular, the towns of Agrica and Mian-Qeslaq seem to have been the main target at the time. In around 1473-3, Haydar and his men performed their first seaborne attack on Dagestan, during which they plundered the predominantly Circassian-inhabited town of Qaytaq as well as the Hamiri plain. Haydar's first mainland campaign in Dagestan happened five years later, in 1478. However, the third and final of his campaigns in Dagestan, which took place in 1488, proved to be his last.

The Shirvanshah had allowed Haydar's first two campaigns, but this time, on his way to the North Caucasus, he sacked the city of Shamakhi. In Tabasaran, outside the Bayqird Castle, Haydar and his men were cornered; in the ensuing pitched battle, on 9 July 1488, they were killed by the combined forces of the Shirvanshah ruler Farrukh Yassar and the Ak Koyunlu Sultan Ya'qub ibn Uzun Hassan. The Ak Koyunlu then ordered for the beheading of Haydar; they buried his severed head later on in Tabriz. Haydar died not far from the location where his own father Junayd had died in 1460. Haydar's son, known regnally as Ismail I, would later move his father's remains (which were thus located in both Tabriz as well as Tabasaran), and bury them inside the Safavid shrine located at Ardabil. Haydar's tomb in Ardabil became a place of pilgrimage.

== Family ==
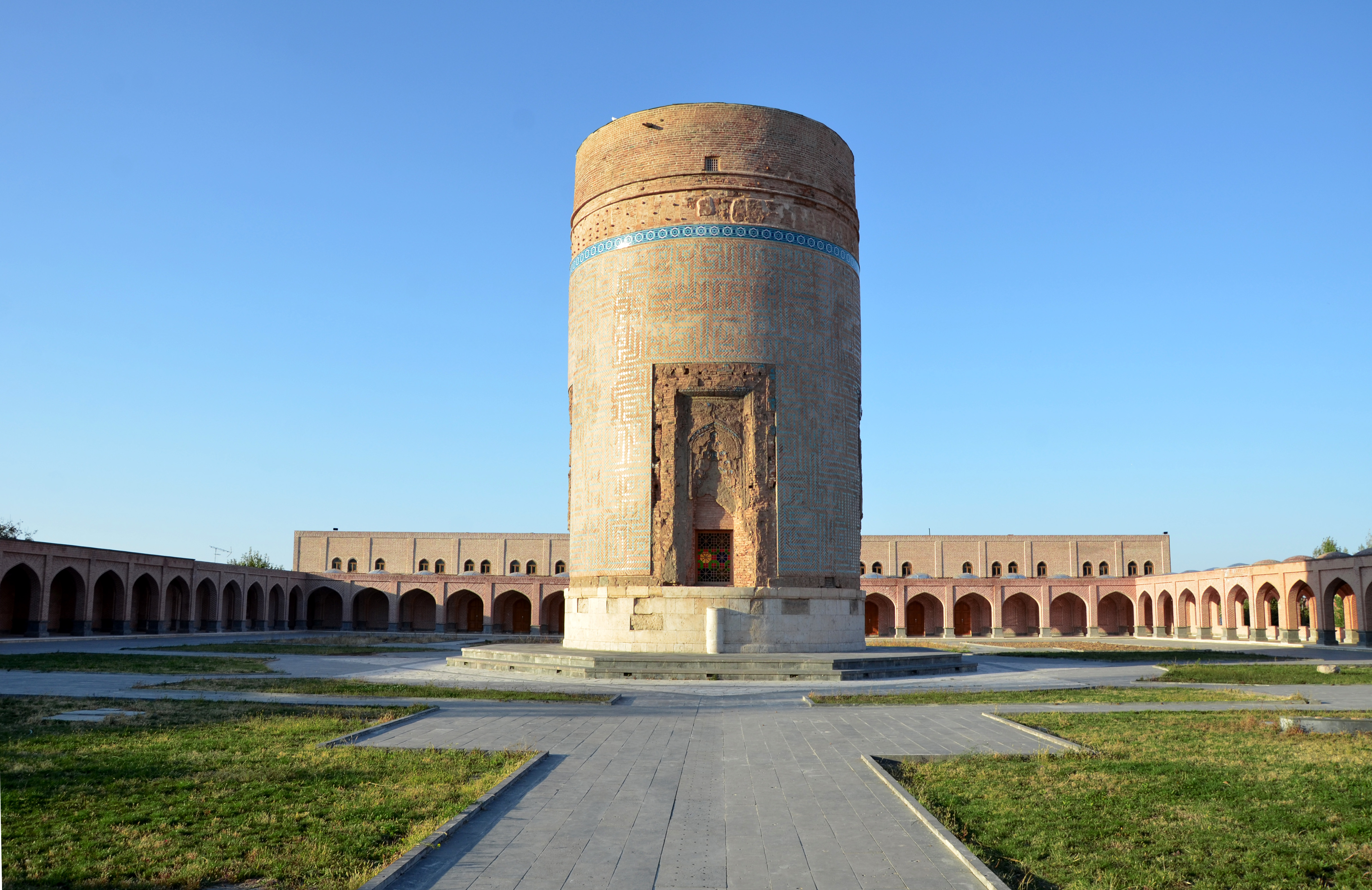
Tomb of Shaykh Haydar in Meshginshahr

Shaykh Haydar was married on two occasions. His first wife, whom he married in 1471–1472, named Halima (otherwise known as Alamshah Begum, or Martha) was a daughter of Uzun Hasan by his wife Despina Khatun (Theodora Megale Komnene), daughter of John IV of Trebizond. In 1473, he married a daughter of Shaykh Farid al-din Jafar b. Khvajeh Ali, the paternal uncle of his father. Shaykh Haydar furthermore had several Circassian and Georgian concubines. With regard to his offspring, ten sons and four daughters are known to have survived his death in 1488.

By Alamshah, Ali Mirza Safavi, Ebrahim Mirza and Ismail I were born. Ali Mirza and Ismail would succeed Shaykh Haydar, while Ebrahim, according to various contemporary accounts, was either passed up in the succession despite being three years older than Ismail, or he shared leadership of the Safavid Order for a number of years until his death in 1500. From his marriage to Jafar's daughter, Sayyed Hasan was born (died ca. 1525). He would serve as an official at the Safavid shrine located in Ardabil during the reign of his half-brother and future king Ismail I. Haydar's eldest daughter, Fakhr-Jahan Khanum, was given in marriage to Bayram Beg Qaramanlu (d. 1514) a powerful tribal leader. The younger sister of Fakhr-Jahan Khanum, Malek Khanum, married Abdallah Khan Shamlu, also known as Abdi Beg Shamlu (d.1506-7), a high-ranking Qizilbash chief, who hailed from Ardabil. The other two daughters of Haydar were given in marriage to respectively Husayn Beg Shamlu, who would later serve as the first vakil (viceregent) of the Safavid Empire, and to Shah-Ali Beg (d. after 1540), the ruler of Hazo and Sason in Anatolia.

== Succession ==
Shaykh Haydar Safavid dynasty
Preceded by Shaykh Junayd	Leader of the Safavid order 1460–1488	Succeeded by Sultan Ali Safawi

== See also ==
- Safavid dynasty
- Safavid family tree

== Sources ==
- Ghereghlou, Kioumars (2016). "ḤAYDAR ṢAFAVI". Encyclopaedia Iranica.
- Jackson, Peter; Lockhart, Lawrence, eds. (1986). The Cambridge History of Iran. Vol. 6. Cambridge: Cambridge University Press. ISBN 978-0521200943.
- Savory, Roger (2007). Iran Under the Safavids. Cambridge: Cambridge University Press. ISBN 978-0521042512.
- Taner, Melis (2020). "Illustrated Manuscripts Attributed to Baghdad". Caught in a whirlwind: a cultural history of Ottoman Baghdad as reflected in its illustrated manuscripts. Leiden; Boston: Brill. ISBN 978-9004412699.
