= Meshginshahr =

City in Ardabil province, Iran

Khiyav خیاو
- City
- Meshgin Shahr
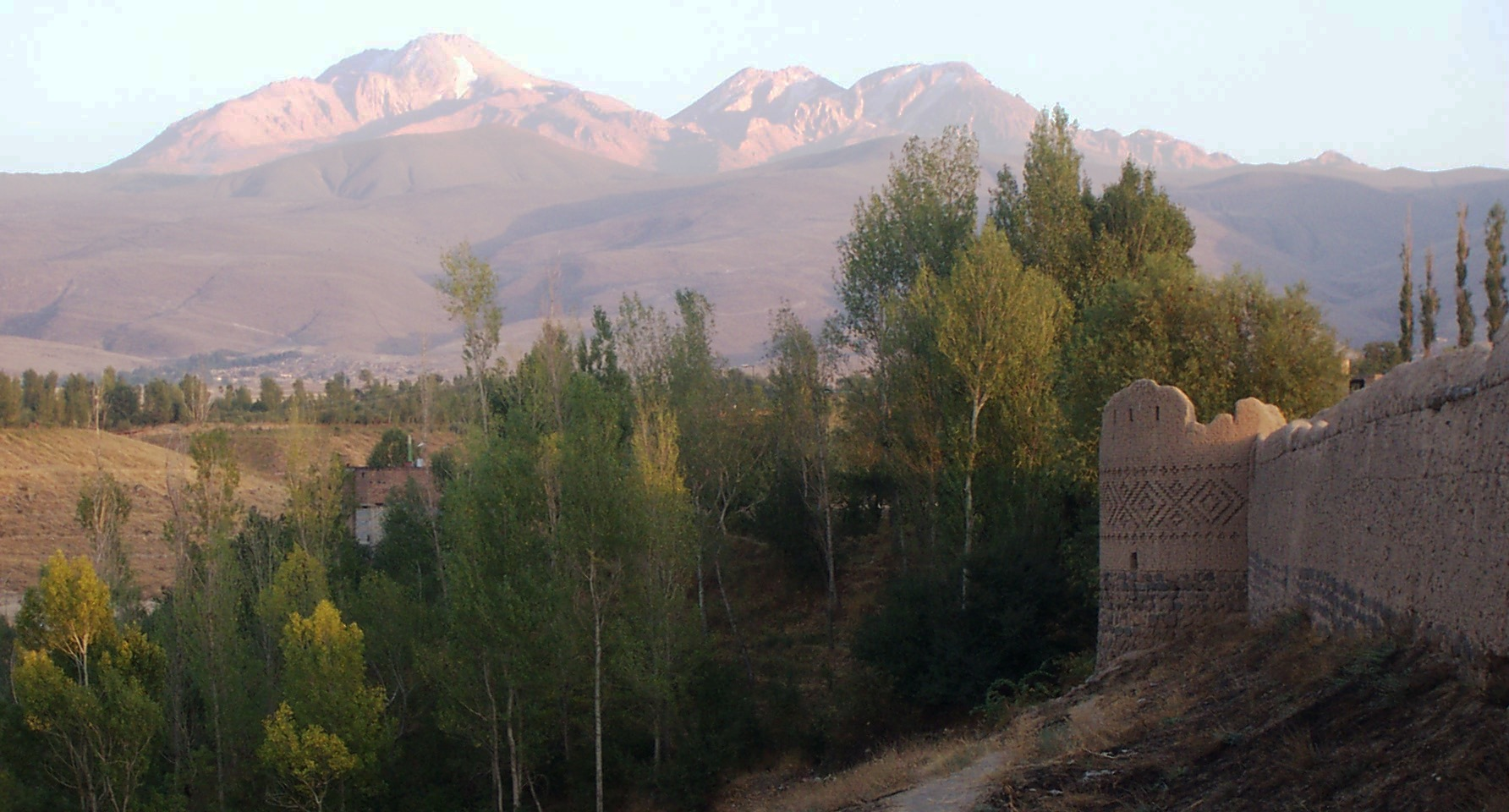
- Arshoq Castle, a.k.a. Kohneh Qaleh ("old castle"), in Meshgin Shahr; Mount Sabalan is in the background

- Location within Iran
- Coordinates: 38°23′26″N 47°40′27″E
- Country: Iran
- Province: Ardabil
- County: Meshgin Shahr
- District: Central

Area
  - Total: 12 km^{2} (4.6 sq mi)

Population (2016)
  - Total: 74,109
  - Density: 6,200/km^{2} (16,000/sq mi)
- Time zone: UTC+3:30 (IRST)
- Website: Official website

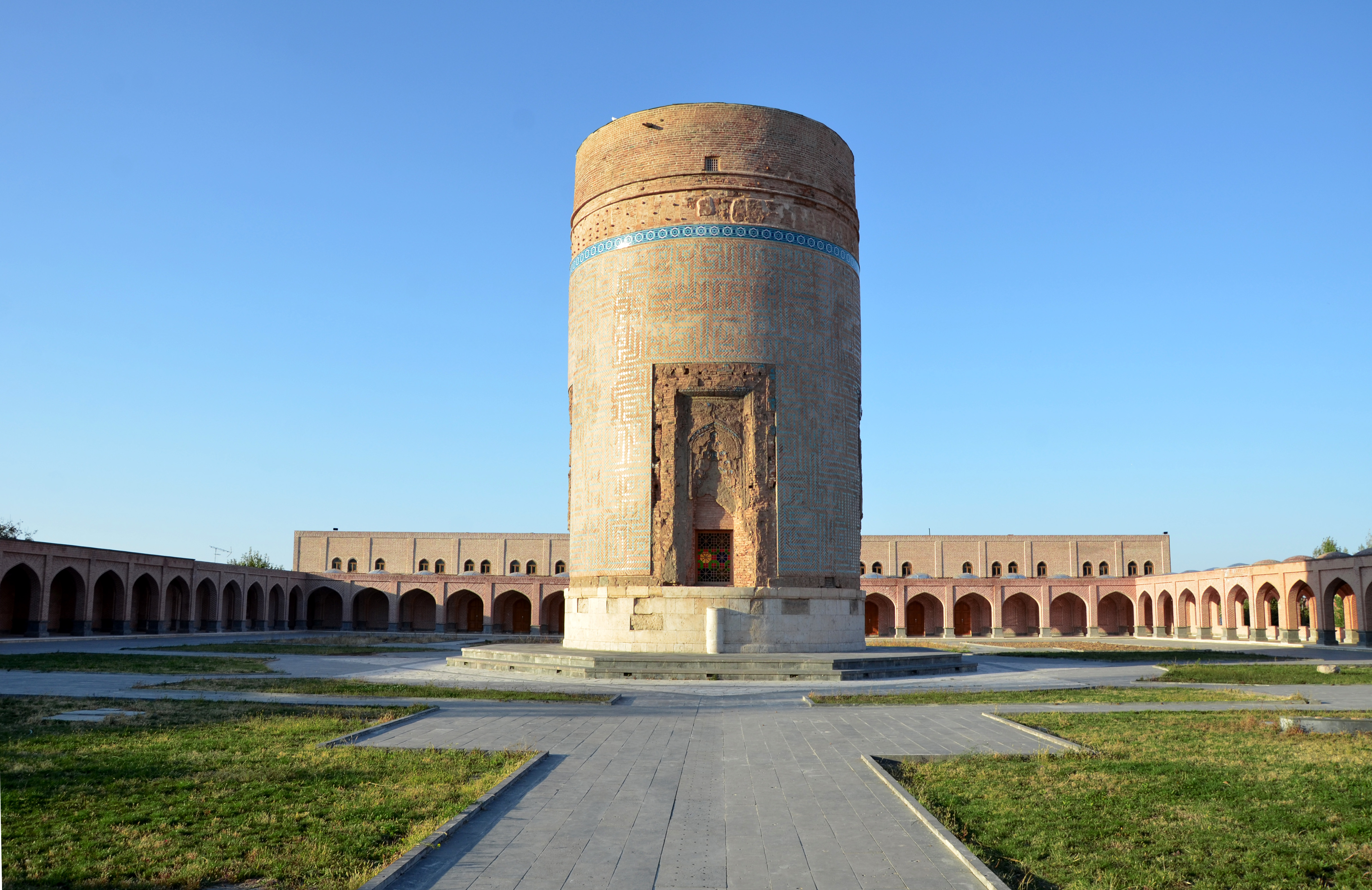
Tomb of Shaykh Haydar

Meshginshahr (Persian: مشگين شهر; South Azerbaijani: خیاو, romanized: Xiyav) (Note: Also romanized as Meshgīn Shahr; also known as Meshkīn Shahr and Mishgin; formerly Khiav (خياو), also romanized as Kheyāv, Khīāv, Khiov, Khīyāv, and Khiyov) is a city in the Central District of Meshgin Shahr County, Ardabil province, Iran, serving as capital of both the county and the district.

== History ==
The 14th-century author Hamdallah Mustawfi mentioned the city, as Khiyāv, as one of the seven cities in the tuman of Pishkin, or Mishkin. He distinguished between the cities of Khiyav and Pishkin: according to him, Khiyav lay to the south of Mount Sablan and had a warm climate, while Pishkin (which he said had formerly been called "Varāvī") was to the north of Mount Sablan and had a damp climate because the mountain shielded it from the sun. Both cities drew their water from the streams coming down from the mountain.

The district of Pishkin, he wrote, grew both grain and fruit in abundance, while Khiyav mostly grew grain. Pishkin was assessed for a tax value of 5,200 dinars, while Khiyav was assessed at 2,000. Mustawfi wrote that Pishkin's population was mostly Shafi'i Sunnis, with Shi'i and Hanafi Sunni minorities. He said nothing about Khiyav's religious makeup, but instead described its population as mostly "boot-makers and cloth-workers".

== Demographics ==
=== Population ===
At the time of the 2006 National Census, the city's population was 61,296 in 14,920 households. The following census in 2011 counted 66,883 people in 17,871 households. The 2016 census measured the population of the city as 74,109 people in 21,926 households.

== Climate ==
Meshginshahr has a Mediterranean-influenced warm-summer humid continental climate (Dsb) in the Köppen climate classification.

Climate data for Meshkinshahr (1995-2010)
Month	Jan	Feb	Mar	Apr	May	Jun	Jul	Aug	Sep	Oct	Nov	Dec	Year
Daily mean °C (°F)	−0.3 (31.5)	1.2 (34.2)	5.0 (41.0)	9.8 (49.6)	14.1 (57.4)	18.6 (65.5)	20.8 (69.4)	21.4 (70.5)	17.2 (63.0)	13.0 (55.4)	6.7 (44.1)	2.5 (36.5)	10.8 (51.5)
Average precipitation mm (inches)	22.7 (0.89)	26.1 (1.03)	38.4 (1.51)	52.9 (2.08)	68.0 (2.68)	30.6 (1.20)	24.4 (0.96)	11.3 (0.44)	25.3 (1.00)	24.4 (0.96)	29.6 (1.17)	19.3 (0.76)	373 (14.68)
Average dew point °C (°F)	−8.2 (17.2)	−8.1 (17.4)	−4.1 (24.6)	1.1 (34.0)	6.0 (42.8)	9.0 (48.2)	10.7 (51.3)	11.5 (52.7)	8.8 (47.8)	3.4 (38.1)	−2.4 (27.7)	−6.2 (20.8)	1.8 (35.2)
Source: IRIMO (daily mean)(precipitation) (dew point 1995-2005)

== Sources ==
- Frye, Richard Nelson; Skjærvø, Prods Oktor (1996). "The Middle Persian Inscription from Meshkinshahr". Bulletin of the Asia Institute. 10: 53–61. JSTOR 24048886. (registration required)
