= Alamshah Halime Begum =

Mother of Ismail I (1460–1522)

Queen mother of Safavid Iran
- Tenure: 1501–1522
- Successor: Tajlu Khanum
- Born: 1460; Diyarbekir, Aq Qoyunlu
- Died: 1522 (aged 61–62); Ardabil, Safavid Iran
- Burial: Sheikh Safi Shrine Ensemble, Ardabil, Iran
- Spouse: Shaykh Haydar
- Issue: Ali Mirza; Ebrahim Mirza; Ismail I; Fakhr Jahan Khanum; Melek Khanum; Other two daughters
- Dynasty: Aq Qoyunlu (by birth); Safavid (from 1501)
- Father: Uzun Hasan
- Mother: Teodora Despina Khatun

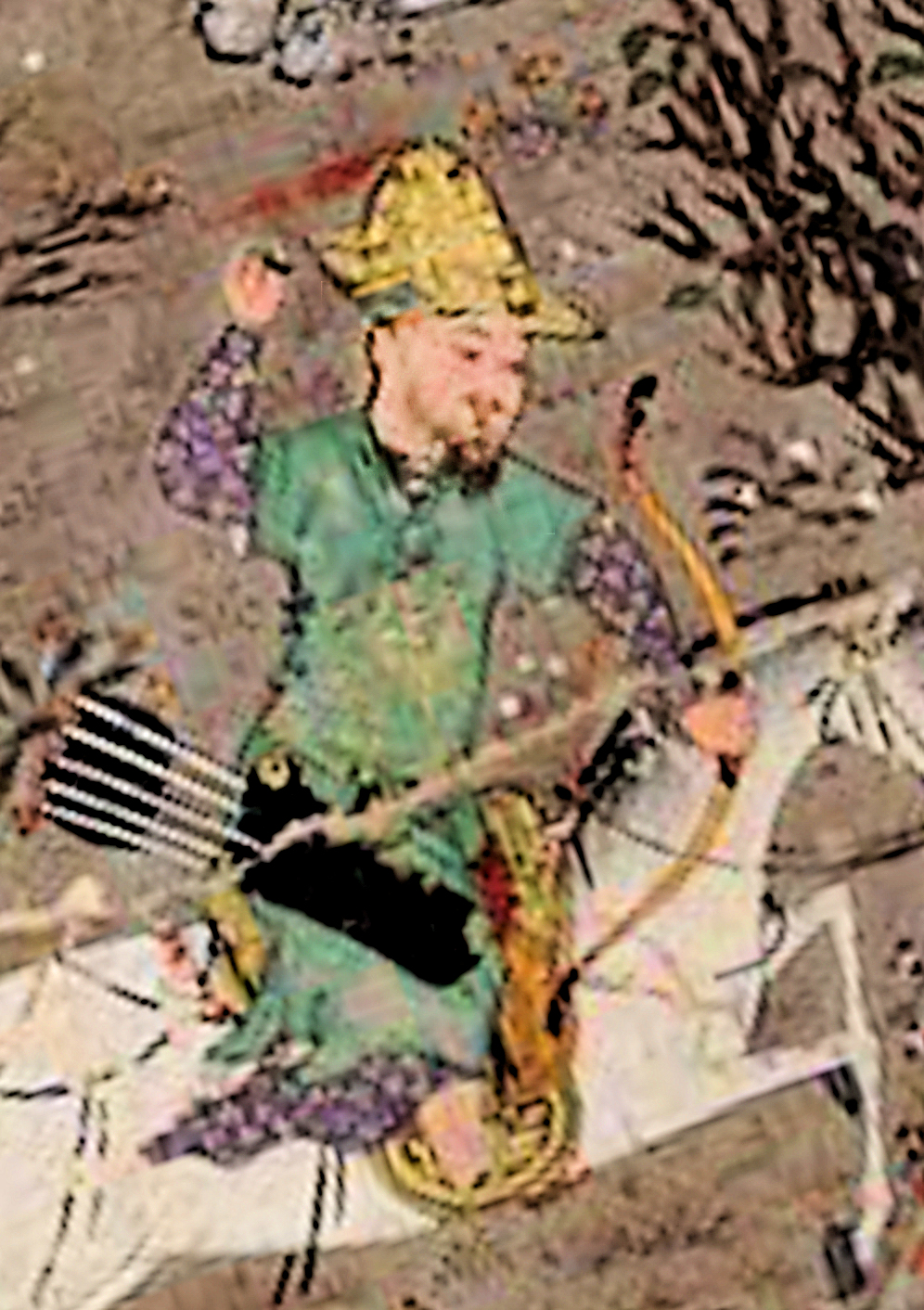
Uzun Hasan, father of Halime Begum (1460s–1470s).

Alamshah Halime Begum (Persian: عالم‌شاه حلیمه بیگم; 1460–1522) was a Turkoman Aq Qoyunlu princess. She was the daughter of Uzun Hasan and Theodora Despina Khatun, and the mother of Ismail I.

== Name ==
There are different opinions about her real name. It may have been Halima, Halime, Alamshah, Alemshah, Alamşah, Alemşah, or Martha.

== Life ==
Her father was the Aq Qoyunlu ruler Uzun Hasan and her mother was the daughter of John IV of Trebizond, Theodora Megale Komnene, also known as "Despina Khatun". There is no reliable information about the first years of her life. In 1471, she married Shaykh Haydar, the son of her paternal aunt Khadija Khatun and the sheikh of the Safavid Order. They had three sons, Ali Mirza, Ebrahim Mirza and Ismail I and four daughters.

== Issue ==
By her husband, she had three sons and four daughters:

- Ali Mirza (Dead 1494), He was the penultimate head of the Safavid order
- Ebrahim Mirza
- Ismail I (1487 – 1524), First Shah of the Safavid Empire
- Fakhr Jahan Khanum, She married Bayram Beg Qaramanlu
- Melek Khanum, She married Abdallah Khan Shamlu
- A daughter who married Husayn Beg Shamlu
- A daughter who married Shah Ali Beg
