= Safavid order =

Iranian Sufi mystic order in Shia Islam

The Safavid order (Persian: طریقت صفویه), also called the Safawiyya (Persian: صفویه, romanized: Safaviyeh), was a Kurdish Sufi order (tariqa) founded by the mystic Zahed Gilani and named after his son-in-law and successor Safi al-Din Ardabili (1252–1334 AD).

Starting in the early 1300s, the leaders of the Safavid movement clearly showed that they wanted political power as well as religious authority. This ambition made the rulers of western Iran and Iraq first feel uneasy, and later, they became openly hostile. Even though three Safavid leaders in a row (Junayd in 1460, Heydar in 1488, and Ali in 1494) were killed in battle, the movement was still strong enough to succeed and lead to the founding of the Safavid dynasty in 1501. The Safavid kings based their authority on three core beliefs: that they were divinely appointed to rule Iran, that they acted as the earthly representatives of the Muhammad al-Mahdi—the Twelfth Imam in Twelver Shi‘ism who is expected to return and bring about a just and peaceful world—and that they served as the moršed-e kāmel, or perfect spiritual guide, of the Safavid Sufi order. However, in the period just before the Safavid state was officially founded, their religious propaganda, known as da‘va, went beyond these claims. It asserted that the Safavid leader was not simply the Mahdi’s representative, but the Mahdi himself—or even a divine incarnation.

== History ==
The Safaviyya, while initially founded by Safi-ad-Din Ardabili under the Shafi'i school of Sunni Islam, later adoptions of Shia concepts by his grandchildren resulted in the order becoming associated with Twelverism. Safi-ad-Din's importance in the order is attested in two letters by Rashid-al-Din Hamadani. In one, Rashid al-Din pledges an annual offering of foodstuffs to Safi-al-Din, and in the other, Rashid al-Din writes to his son, the governor of Ardabil, advising him to show proper respect and comportment to the mystic.

After Safi-ad-Din death, leadership of the order passed to his son, Sadr al-Din Musa, and subsequently passed down from father to son, and by the mid-fifteenth century, the Safawiyya changed in character, evolving into a ghulat form of Twelver Shi'ism, becoming militant under Shaykh Junayd and Shaykh Haydar by proclaiming Jihad against the Christians of Georgia, and becoming exaggerative by adopting messianic beliefs about its leadership and antinomian practices outside of the norm of Twelver Shia Islam.

Junayd's grandson, Ismail, further altered the nature of the order when he founded the Safavid empire in 1501 and proclaimed Twelver Shi'ism as the state religion, at which point he imported Twelver Shia ulama largely from Lebanon and Syria to transform the order into a Twelver Shi'i dynasty.

== List of leaders ==
1. Safi al-Din Ardabili, son-in-law of Zahed Gilani, 1301–1334
2. Sadr al-Din Musa, son of Safi al-Din, 1334–1391
3. Khavjeh Ali, son of Sadr al-Din, 1391–1427
4. Shaykh Ibrahim, son of Khvajeh Ali, 1427–1447
5. Shaykh Junayd, son of Ibrahim, 1447–1460
6. Shaykh Haydar, son of Junayd, 1460–1488
7. Ali Mirza, son of Haydar, 1488–1494
8. Isma'il, son of Haydar, 1494–1524

== See also ==
- Safavid family tree
- Safvat as-Safa
- Safavid dynasty
- Musha'sha'iyyah, a rival Isma'ili Shi'i sect
