= Ispahbads of Gilan =

Former principality in Iran

Realm of Sipahbad Persian: مملکت سپهبد
- ?–15th century
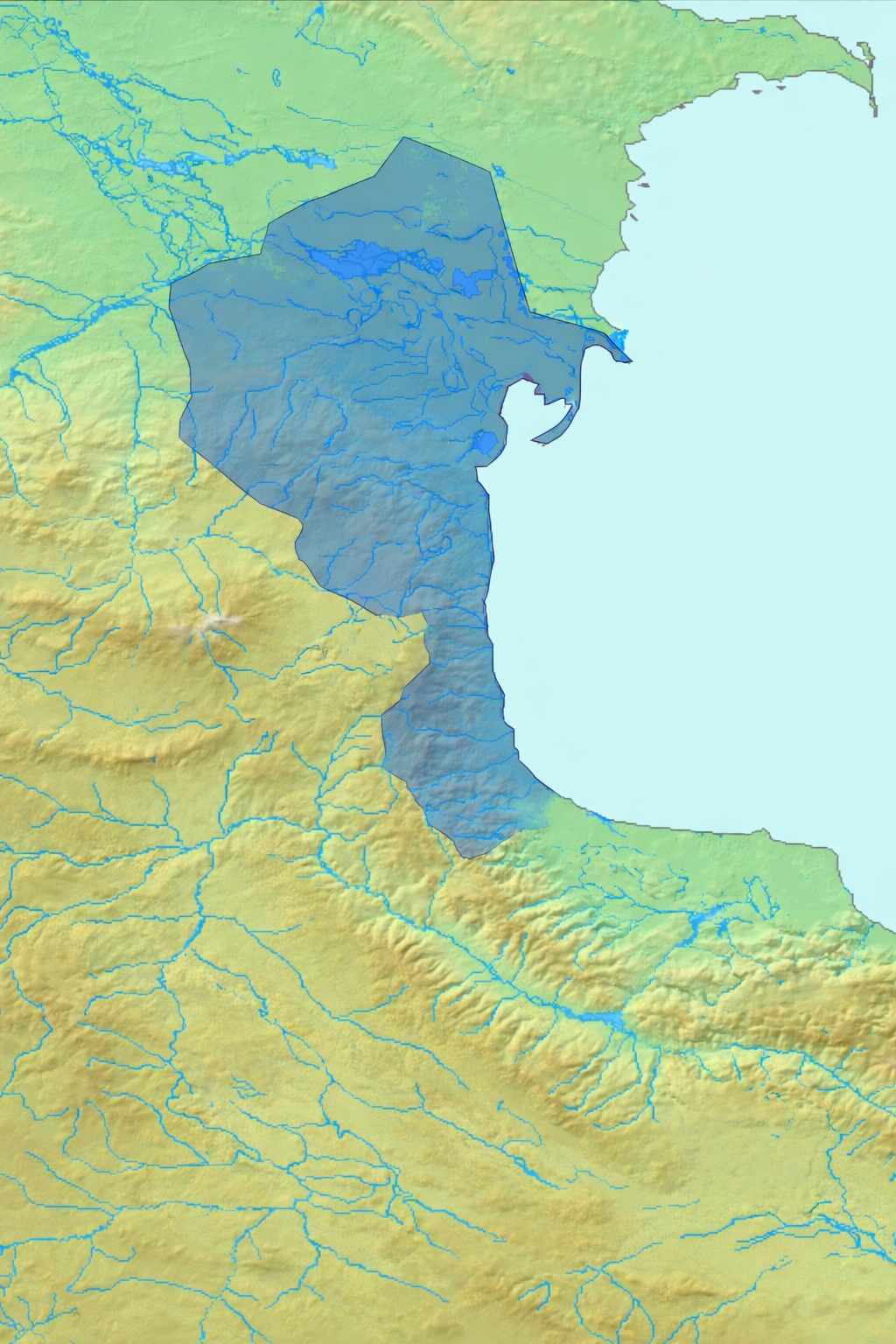
- Map of the domains of the Ispahbads of Gilan
- Status: Autonomous under suzerainty of Umayyad Caliphate, Abbasid Caliphate, Ilkhanate, Timurid Empire and Safavid Empire
- Capital: Shandan; Astara (from 14th century)
- Government: Principality
- Ispahbad
  - 12th century: Kiyā Livāshīr
  - 13th–14th century: Ahmad
  - 14th–15th century: Hussein
  - ?–1408/09: Shapur
- Historical era: Middle Ages
  - Established: ?
  - Disestablished: 15th century
Succeeded by
Safavid Talish
- Today part of: Iran Azerbaijan

Ispahbads of Gīlān (Persian: اسپهبدان گیلان) or Esfahbad of Gīlān was a Talysh small principality in Iran. In the 14th century, Āstārā became the seat of the principality.

== History ==
According to Minorsky, no detailed record seems to be extant of a principality which for a long time existed on the territory between Gilan and Mūqān (Mūghān) and whose rulers had the title of ispahbad or sipahbad. According to Ibn Khurdādhbih (who wrote not later than in 885) Mūqān belonged to Shekla. Towards 936, the isfahbadh of Mūqān, Ibn-Dalūla, sided with a rebel chief of Gilan, Lashkarī ibn-Mardī, and opposed the Kurdish ruler of Azarbayjan, Daysam ibn-Ibrāhīm. His headquarters seem to have been on the northern bank of the Araxes and we cannot say whether he was of the same family as the later sipahbads of Gilan, whose activities centered more to the south, in Tālysh speaking area. The late A. Kasravi discovered in the dīvān of the poet Qatran a curious ode on an expedition which the Rawādī ruler of Tabriz, Vahsūdān (circa 1025–1059) sent to Ardabil, under the leadership of his son Mamlan. As a result, a fortress was built in Ardabil and the sipahbad of Mūqān had to submit to the conqueror.

As of Gilan, Mustawfī mentions the little town of Iṣfahbad, which Yāḳūt spells Isfahbudhān, adding that stood two miles distant from the coast of the Caspian, but nor otherwise indicating its position; corn, rice, and a little fruit were grown here, ind in neighboring district were near a hundred villages. The name of the township came from the Iṣfahbads.

Gilan province

In later Seljuk times we hear of «Nusrat al-dīn Abul-Muzaffar Ispahbad Kiyā Livāshīr», to whom Khaqanī dedicated several poems in which he praised his liberality and mourned his untimely demise. In a threnody written after his death, he says farewell to Shandān and Archavān, of which the former is an ancient fortress (north of the Astara river) and the latter a village lying some 7–8 km. to the N.W. of Astārā.This may have been only a splinter of the ancient territory of the sipahbads, but the fact is that in it they survived even in the days of the Mongol Ilkhans. The History of Uljāytū, quoting the description of Gilan by one Asil al-din Muhammad Zauzanī (at the time of the arrival of Hulegu, circa 1256), also names Shandān as the capital of the sipahbads.

According to the Safvat, when Safi ad-Din was inquiring in Fars about the whereabouts of Shaykh Zāhid, he was told that the latter lived in the part of Gilan belonging to the Ispahbad (Gīlān-i Ispahbad). It further tells how Shaykh Zāhid interceded in favour of Malik Ahmad Isbahbad of Gilan, when Ghazan fell foul of him and arrested him, and how Malik Ahmad entertained the shaykh. According to Hāfiz-i Abrū, at the time of Uljāytū's campaign in Gilan (1307), the Sipahbad's name was Rukn al-din Ahmad and he served as a guide to the troops of Amir Chopan. Consequently, it becomes probable that the Malik Ahmad mentioned in Abu-Sa'īd's decree (Melig Aqmad) as having given the three villages (Kenleče, Sidil, and Aradi) to Badr al-dīn Mahmūd was the same local ruler.

Qāsim al-Anvār who lived in 1356–1433 and was closely connected with the Safavid family, tells in one of his poems a story about the sipahbad of Gilan Jalāl al-dīn Hūsayn whose throne (takht) was in Astārā.

== Decline ==
According to Minorsky, we do not know whether the later governors of Astara still continued the line of the ispahbads. Even after the conquest of Northern Tālish by the Russians (1813) the family of the Tālysh-khans maintained some special rights but the degree of its connexion with the ancient sipahbads would require painstaking investigation.

== See also ==
- Talish–Mughan culture
- Talysh Khanate
- Talysh-Mughan Autonomous Republic

== Sources ==
- Bazin, Marcel [in Persian] (2012) [1987]. "ĀSTĀRĀ i. Town and sub-province". In Yarshater, Ehsan (ed.). Encyclopædia Iranica. Fasc. 8. Vol. II. New York City: Bibliotheca Persica Press. pp. 837–838.
- Ḥarīrī, Ašraf [in Persian] (2006). Āstārā dar guḏargāh-i tārīḫ (in Persian). Rasht: Dihsarā. ISBN 9789648575385.
- Le Strange, Guy (1905). The Lands of the Eastern Caliphate: Mesopotamia, Persia, and Central Asia, from the Moslem Conquest to the Time of Timur. Cambridge: Cambridge University Press.
- Minorsky, Vladimir (October 1954). "A Mongol Decree of 720/1320 to the Family of Shaykh Zāhid". Bulletin of the School of Oriental and African Studies. 16 (3). London: SOAS University of London: 515–527. doi:10.1017/S0041977X00086821. JSTOR 608620. S2CID 159901706.
