= Kiyā Livāshīr =

12th-century Iranian prince

Nusrat ad-Din Abu Muzaffar Kiyā Livāshīr was a ruler of the Ispahbads of Gilan.

== History ==
Kiyā lived during the time of the Persian poet Khagani, who paid a lot of attention to Kiyā in his works. In particular, Khagani said that he helped him for several weeks and took care of him. He sent him two thousand gold dinars and gifts. Minorsky V. believed that Kiyā Livāshīr was one of the ispahbads of Mughan and was the owner of Shindan and Archivan. Due to his sharp political position towards the Khorezmshahs, he was assassinated at a young age.
