= Tomb of Shaykh Zahed Gilani =

15th-century mausoleum in Lahijan, Iran

- آرامگاه شیخ زاهد گیلانی
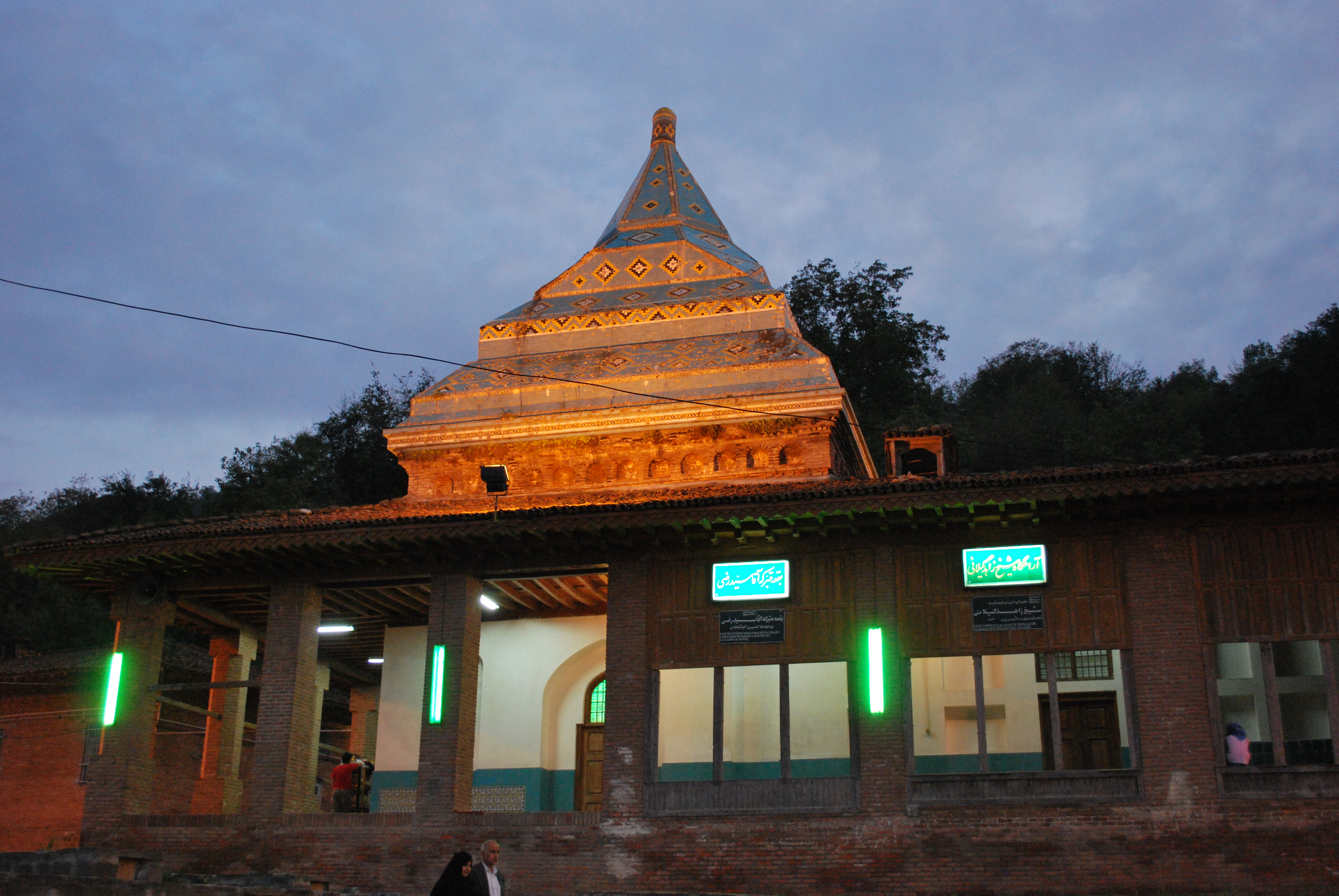
- The mausoleum during the evening

- Location of the complex in Iran

Religion
- Affiliation: Islam
- Ecclesiastical or organizational status: Mausoleum
- Status: Active

Location
- Location: Lahijan, Gilan province
- Country: Iran
- Interactive map of Tomb of Shaykh Zahed Gilani
- Coordinates: 37°12′06″N 50°02′47″E

Architecture
- Type: Islamic architecture
- Style: Safavid
- Completed: 15th century CE
- Materials: Timber; bricks

The Tomb of Shaykh Zahed Gilani (Persian: آرامگاه شیخ زاهد گیلانی), also known as Sheikhanvar (Persian: شیخانور), is a Shafi Sunni Islam mausoleum, located in Lahijan, Gilan province, Iran. It dates from the Safavid era. This mausoleum is the purported burial place of Zahed Gilani, a 13th-century Sufi mystic and the forefather of the Zahediyeh and Safaviyya Sufi orders, which would eventually evolve into the religion of the Safavid Empire. The mausoleum was added to the Iran National Heritage List, numbered 824.

== History ==
Zahed Gilani died in 1301, during the early 14th century. The mausoleum was built in the late 15th century, presumably around 1480–1499, and it was renovated during the early Safavid era. Local tradition and folklore relates that the mausoleum's construction was ordered by Shaykh Haydar after he received an incomprehensible dream during his sleep. During the Qajar era, the walls were decorated extensively with tiles.

== Architecture ==
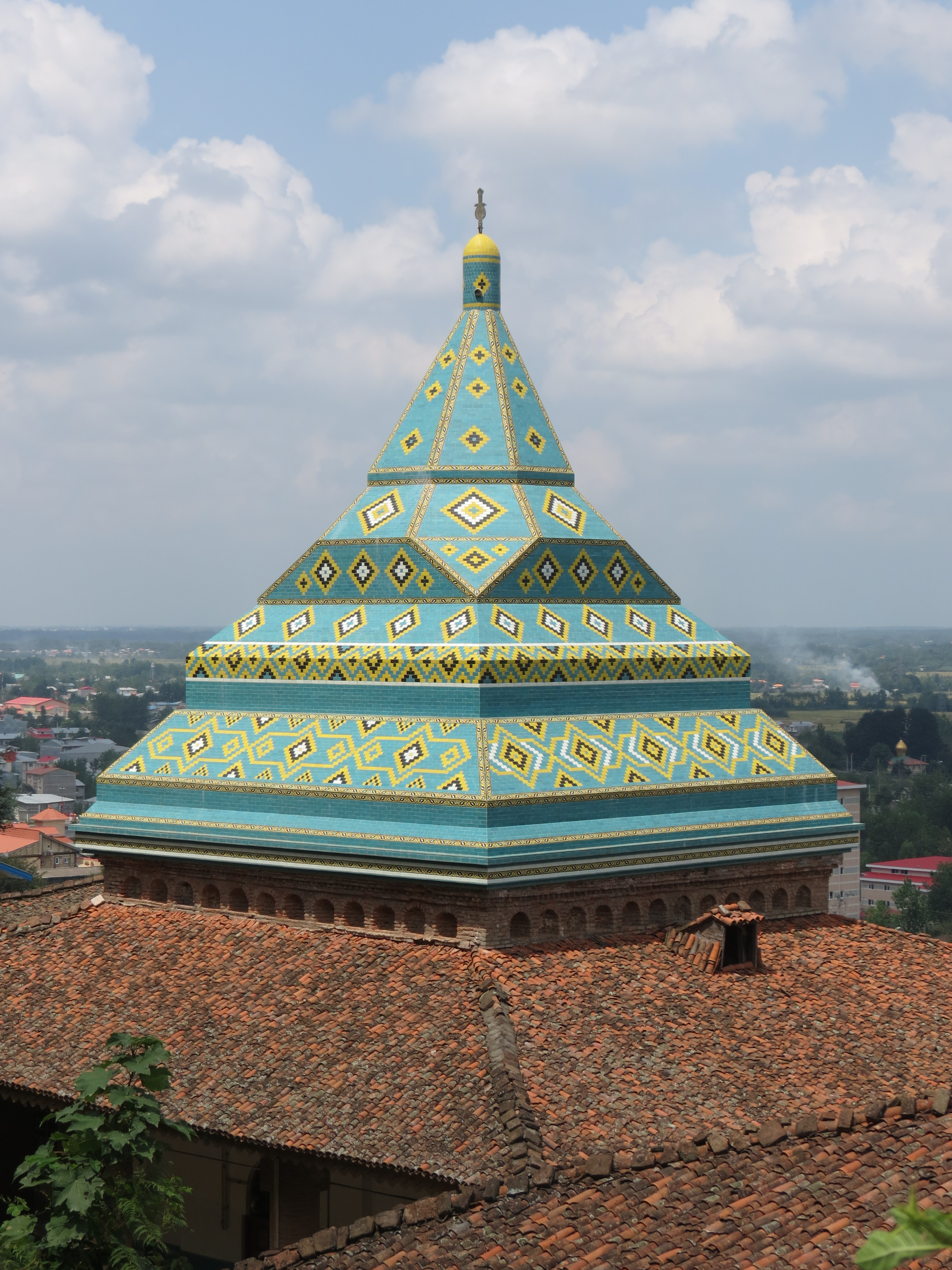
The mausoleum's pagoda-like dome

The mausoleum is constructed primarily out of wood and brick. It is rectangular in shape, and has a porch in front of it.

The dome of the mausoleum is in a unique, pagoda-like style. It is decorated with turquoise tiles. It has eight layers as well. The steep slopes on this dome allows rainwater to flow off smoothly.

Inside the mausoleum, there are two rooms. The square-shaped room underneath the dome holds the tomb of Zahed Gilani. The second room, more rectangular, holds two tombs. One of the tombs is dedicated to a religious cleric, Seyyed Razi ibn Mahdi al-Husseini, while the other tomb belongs to one of the daughters of the founder of the Timurid dynasty, Tamerlane.

== Other tombs ==
In the city of Lankaran in Azerbaijan, there is another tomb which is attributed to Zahed Gilani. Some do not believe that the site in Lahijan is the actual burial place, and regard it as merely a symbolic tomb or the burial place of a similarly named mystic.

== Gallery ==
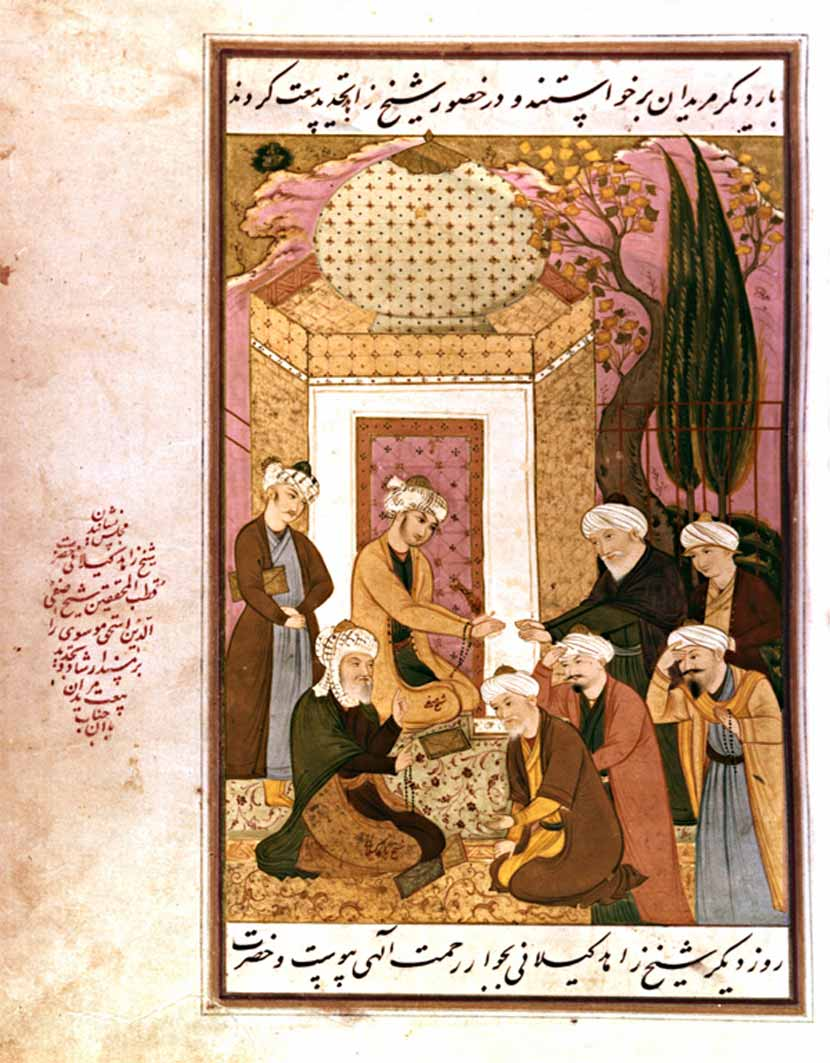
An illustration of Zahed Gilani designating Safi ad-Din Ardabili as his successor to the Sufi order

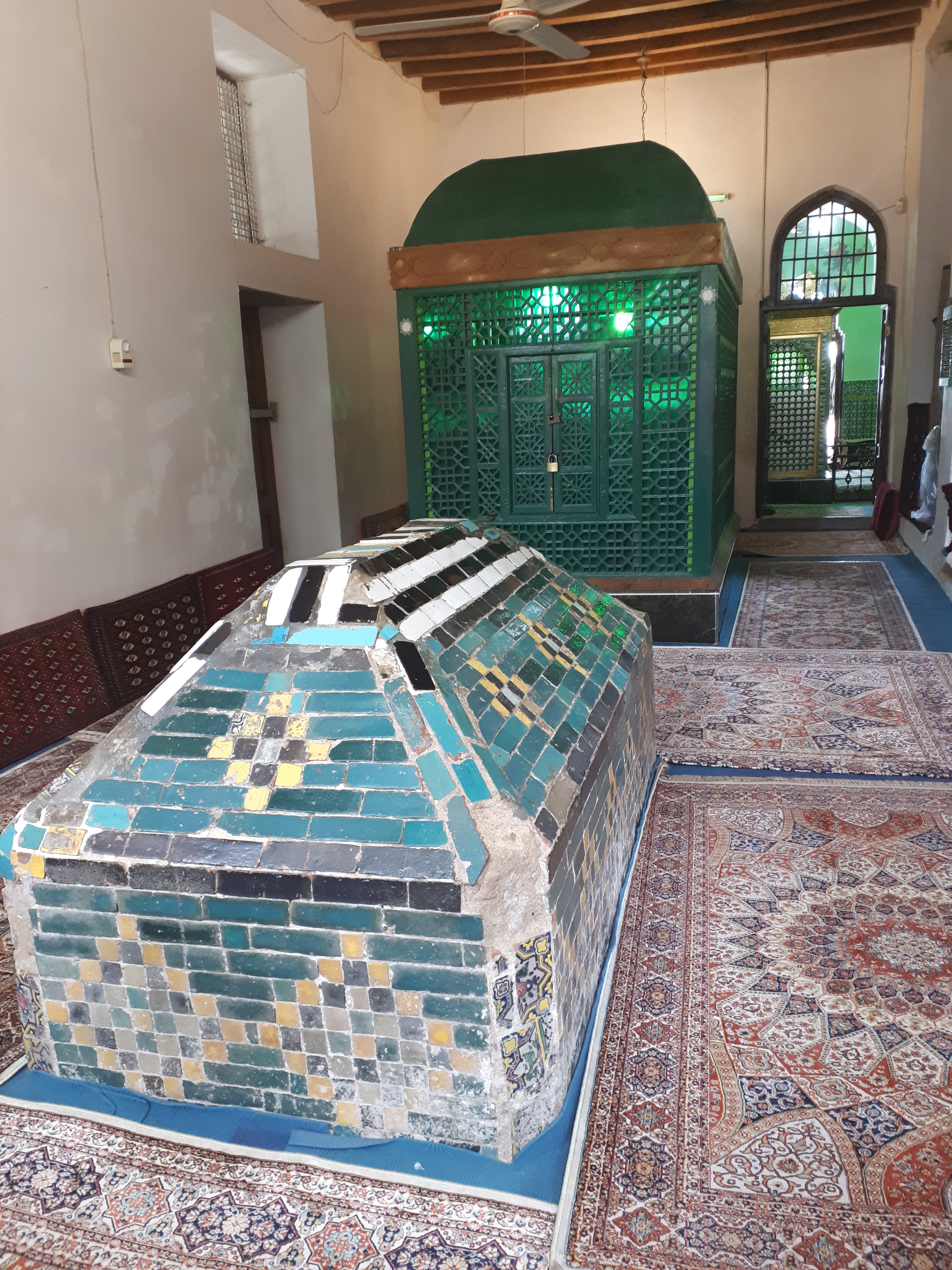
Interior

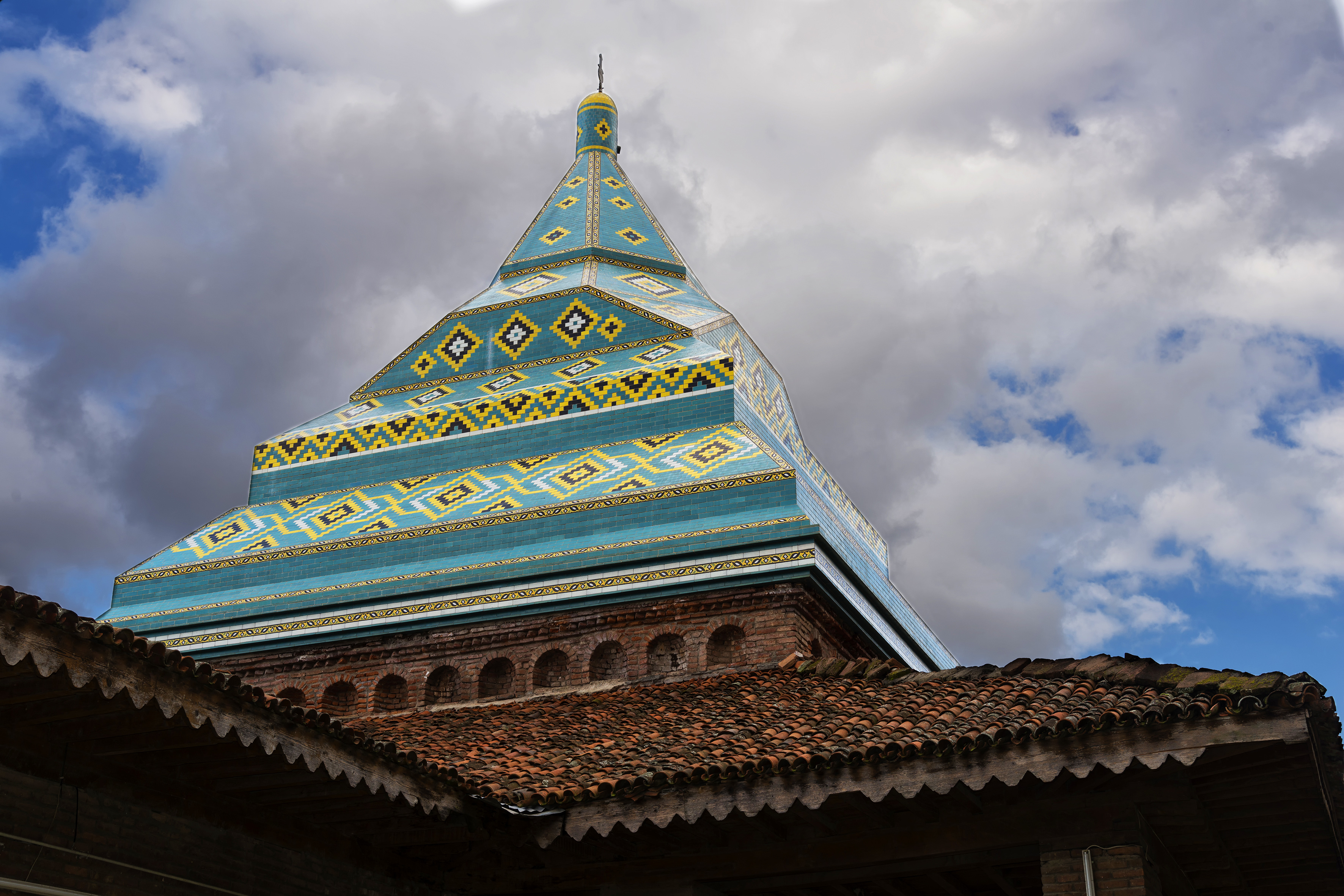
The pagoda-like dome of the mausoleum

== See also ==
- Sheikh Safi ad-Din Ensemble
- List of mausoleums in Iran
- Shia Islam in Iran
