= Firuz-Shah Zarrin-Kolah =

Patriarch of the Safavid dynasty

Firuzshah Zarrin-Kolah (Kurdish:پیرۆز شای کڵاو زێڕین) was a Kurdish dignitary and seventh in the ancestral lineage of Safi-ad-Din Ardabili, the eponym of the Safavid dynasty ruling Safavid Iran.

== Genealogy ==
In the pre-Safavid written work Safvat as-safa, whose oldest extant manuscripts date to 1485 and 1491, the origin of the Safavid dynasty is traced to Firuzshah Zarin Kollah, who is called a Kurd from Sanjār, while in the post-Safavid manuscripts, this portion "Kurd from Sanjār" has been excised. Firuzshah Zarin Kollah is made a descendant of the Twelve Imams. The male lineage of the Safavid family given by the oldest manuscript of the Safwat al-Safa is:"[Sheykh] Safi al-Din Abul-Fatah Ishaaq the son of Al-Shaykh Amin al-Din Jebrail the son of al-Salah Qutb al-Din Abu Bakr the son of Salâh al-Din Rashid the son of Muhammad al-Hafiz al-Kalâm Allah, the son of ‘Avâd the son of Birûz (Pirûz) al-Kurdi al-Sanjāri.

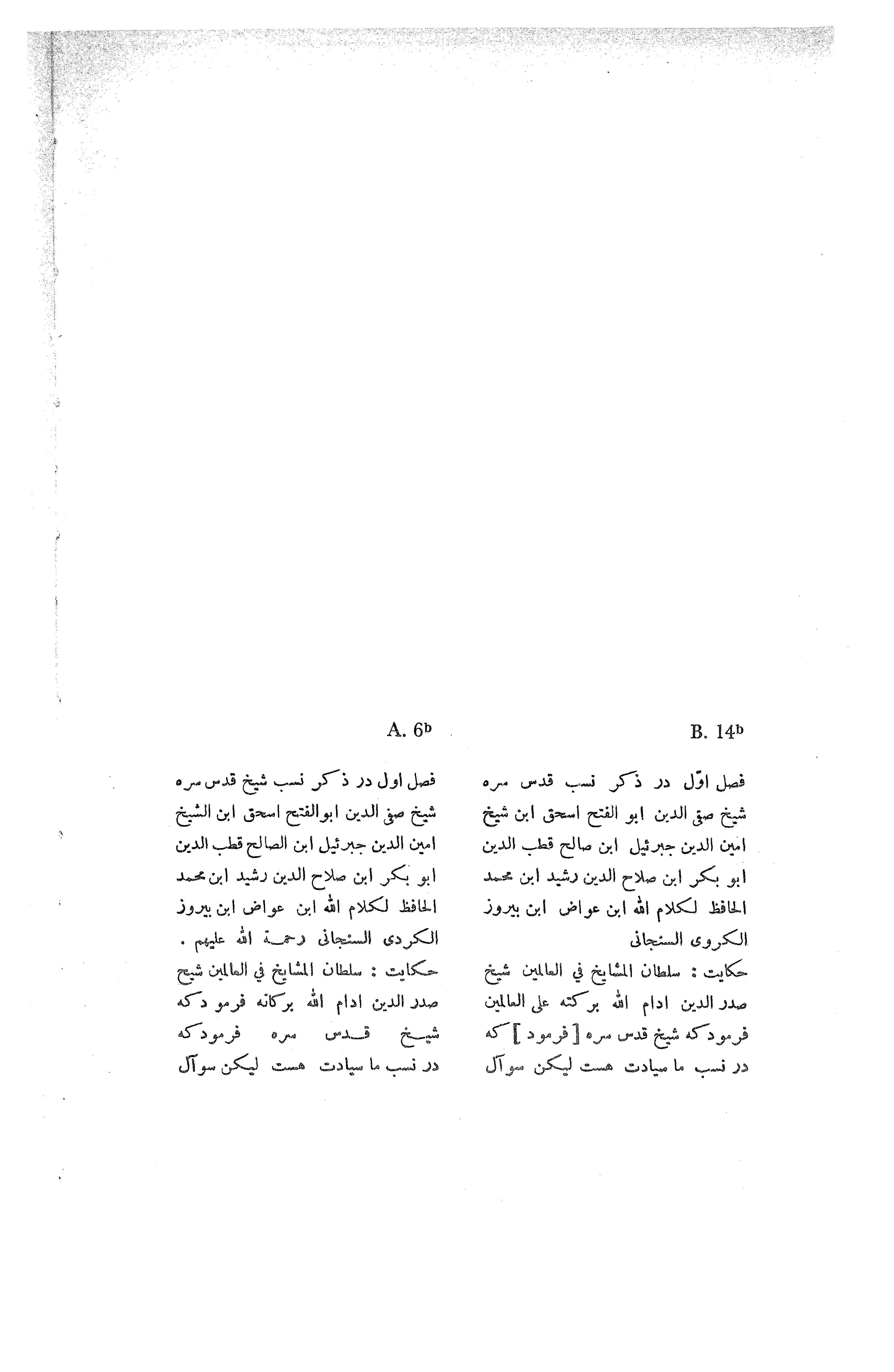
Excerpt from the Safvat al-Safa, which describes the lineage of Safi-ad-Din Ardabili and traces it to Firuz Shah Zarin Kolah

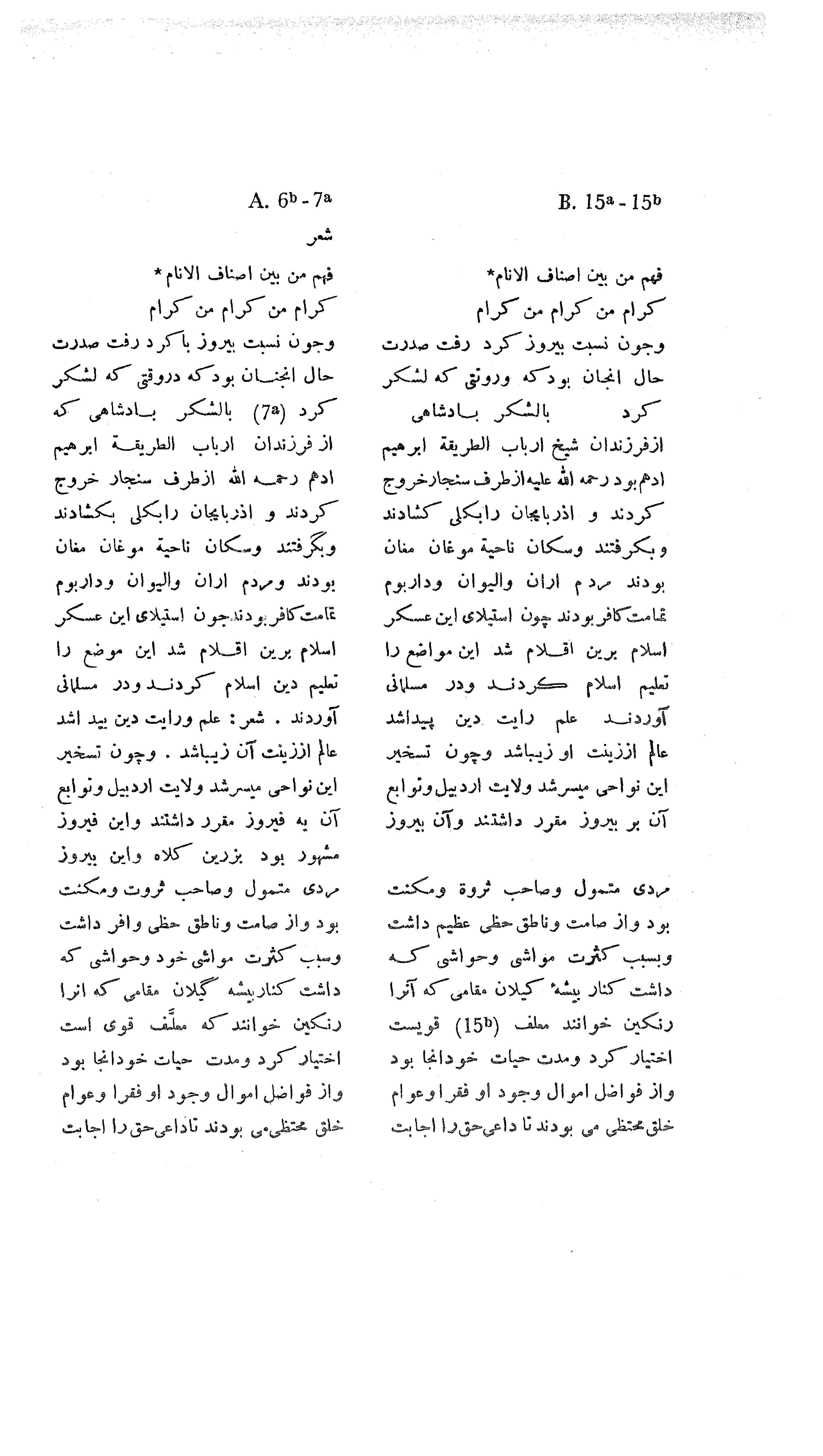
Wa chon Nisbat Biruz bâ Kord raft translates to "Since the origin of Birooz was Kurdish"

Firuz Shah likely migrated from Kurdistan to the region of Ardabil in the 11th century.

After the establishment of Safavid rule, official genealogies traced the lineage of Firuz Shah Zarrin-Kolah to the seventh of the Twelver Imams, Musa al-Kazim. In the Silsilat-an-Nasab-i Safaviya, composed during the reign of Suleiman I (1667–1694) and written by Shah Hussab ibn Abdal Zahidi, the ancestry of the Safavid is traced back to Ali. The origins of the family of Safi-al-Din go back not to Hijaz but to Kurdistan, from where, six generations before him, Firuz Shah Zarrin-kulah had migrated to Azerbaijan. His name was also given as "al-Sinjabi".
