= Kerbelayi Hamid Abdulla Bath =

- Kərbəlayi Həmid Abdulla hamamı (Azerbaijani)
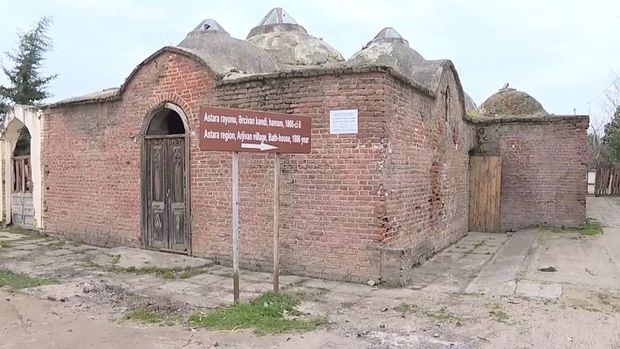
- Interactive map of Kerbelayi Hamid Abdulla Bath
- 38°30′15″N 48°49′49″E
- Location: Astara District, Erchivan settlement

History
- Built: 1806

Kerbelayi Hamid Abdulla Bath is a historical and architectural monument in Azerbaijan located in the town of Erchivan in the Astara district. It was built in 1806 by the philanthropist Kerbelayi Hamid Abdulla.

The bath was included in the list of local significant immovable historical and cultural monuments by decision No. 132 of the Cabinet of Azerbaijan dated August 2, 2001.

== About ==
The bathhouse was constructed in 1806 by Kerbelayi Hamid Abdulla in the town of Erchivan in the Astara district. It features eight domes and was built using a mixture of egg yolk and ordinary wood ash. The bathhouse's water is heated using only one furnace.

After the Soviet occupation, the bathhouse was handed over to the Kolkhoz. It underwent renovation for the last time in 1980 and remained in use by the local population until the end of that year.

Following the restoration of Azerbaijan's independence, the bathhouse was included in the list of local significant immovable historical and cultural monuments by decision No. 132 of the Cabinet of Ministers of the Republic of Azerbaijan on August 2, 2001.

Due to years of disuse, several of its domes have collapsed, and the building has fallen into a state of disrepair. It is in urgent need of substantial restoration.
