= Ferozeshah =

Ferozeshah may refer to:

- Firuz Shah Tughlaq, Sultan of Delhi, India from 1351 to 1388
  - Feroz Shah Kotla, fort in Delhi, India
    - Feroz Shah Kotla Stadium, a cricket stadium in Delhi
  - Firoz Shah palace complex, Hisar, Haryana, India
- Firuz Shah Suri, Sultan of the Sur Empire of India in 1554
- Taj ud-Din Firuz Shah, Sultan of the Bahmani Sultanate from 1397 to 1422
- Firuz-Shah Zarrin-Kolah, Patriarch of the Safavid dynasty
- Ferozeshah, a village in Punjab, India, notable for the Battle of Ferozeshah

== See also ==
- Pherozeshah Mehta, Indian politician and lawyer
  - Pherozeshah Mehta Gardens, Mumbai, India
