= Zahediyeh =

Sufi order in northern Persia, precursor to the Safaviyya

- Founded: 13th century CE
- Founder: Sheikh Zahed Gilani
- Founded at: Gilan (northern Persia)
- Type: Sufi order
- Region served: Persia, Caucasus
- Official language: Persian, Arabic
- Key people: Safi-ad-Din Ardabili
- Affiliations: Sufism, later Safaviyya

The Zahediyeh or Zahediyya (Persian: زاهدیه) was a Sufi order established in northern Persia in the 13th century CE by Sheikh Zahed Gilani (Taj al-Din Ebrahim). It played a formative role in the religious and spiritual developments of the region, and later served as the spiritual precursor to the Safaviyya order, from which the Safavid dynasty emerged in the early 16th century CE.

== Origins ==
Sheikh Zahed Gilani (Taj al-Din Ebrahim) established the Zahediyeh in Gilan, northern Persia, during the Ilkhanid period (13th century). Historical traditions describe him as a religious leader of wide influence, who attracted followers across the Caspian region. His most prominent disciple was Safi-ad-Din Ardabili (1252–1334), who married Zahed Gilani's daughter and succeeded him as the head of the order around 1301 CE.

Sheikh Safi-ad-Din Ardabili (1252–1334), the founder of the Safaviyya order and eponym of the Safavid dynasty, was a disciple and son-in-law of Sheikh Zahed Gilani of Lahijan. He succeeded his master as head of the Zahediyeh and transformed it into a widely influential religious movement centered in Ardabil.

The Zahediyeh was based in Lahijan and the surrounding Daylam region, where it gained wide popular support. Safi-ad-Din's succession transformed the order into what later became known as the Safaviyya.

== Historical development ==
Accounts suggest that both Sheikh Zahed Gilani and Safi-ad-Din Ardabili originated from the Sinjar region (modern-day northern Iraq). The order's early history reflects interaction between diverse ethnic and religious groups of the Caspian and Kurdistan regions during the Ilkhanid era.

== Legacy ==
The Zahediyeh's influence extended beyond Gilan and Ardabil. Its spiritual line connected directly to the emergence of the Safavid dynasty, which institutionalized Shi‘i Islam as the state religion of Iran in 1501. The order is remembered as a bridge between classical Persian Sufism and the political-religious movements of early modern Iran.

== See also ==
- Safi al-Din Ardabili
- Safaviyya
- Safavid dynasty
- Gilan
- List of Sufi orders
