= Sadr al-Din Musa =

Leader of the Safaviyya (1305–1391)

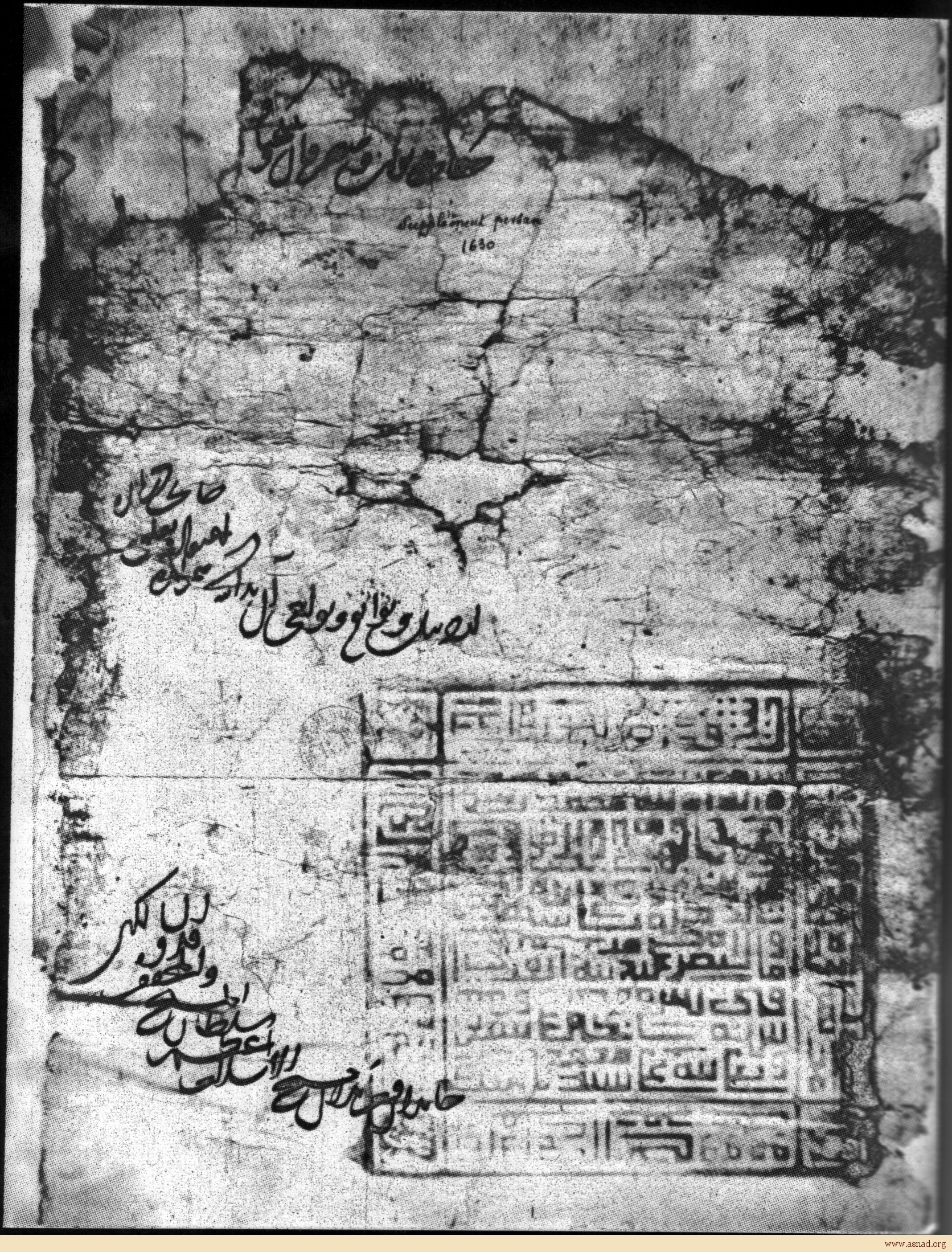
- Firman attributed to Sultan Ahmad Jalayir, whereby Shaykh Sadr al-Din receives tax exemptions and contributions concerning his own property and that of his order (goods from the endowment as well as other ones). Bilingual document in Persian and Mongolian, dated 1372
- Title: Murshid

Personal life
- Born: 1305 Ardabil, modern day Iran
- Died: 1391 (aged 85–86)

Religious life
- Religion: Islam
- Denomination: Sunni
- Jurisprudence: Shafi'i

Muslim leader
- Predecessor: Safi-ad-Din Ardabili
- Successor: Khvajeh Ali Safavi

Sadr al-Din Musa (Persian: صدرالدین موسی; 1305–1391) was the son and successor of Safi-ad-Din Ardabili. His mother was Bibi Fatima, daughter of Zahed Gilani. Sadr al-Din directed the Safaviyya for 59 years. During this time, the activities of the Safaviyya were viewed with favour by Timur, who provided an endowment for the shrine of Safi-ad-din Ardabili in Ardabil, and allowed Sadr al-Din to collect taxes. Timur also offered Sadr al-Din to request any favour from himself, and Sheikh Sadr al-Din asked for the release of Turkish prisoners captured by Timur from Diyarbakır. Timur accepted this request, and the freed prisoners became Sadr al-Din's loyal disciples. The descendants of these freed prisoners, emigrating by the thousands into Gilan province, would later aid his family to found a dynasty.

In 1335, Sadr al-Din Musa built the dome tomb of Shayk Safi his father, in Ardabil, Iran. He was buried at Ardabil near his father. His son Khwādja Ali († 1429) succeeded him as leader of the Safaviyya.

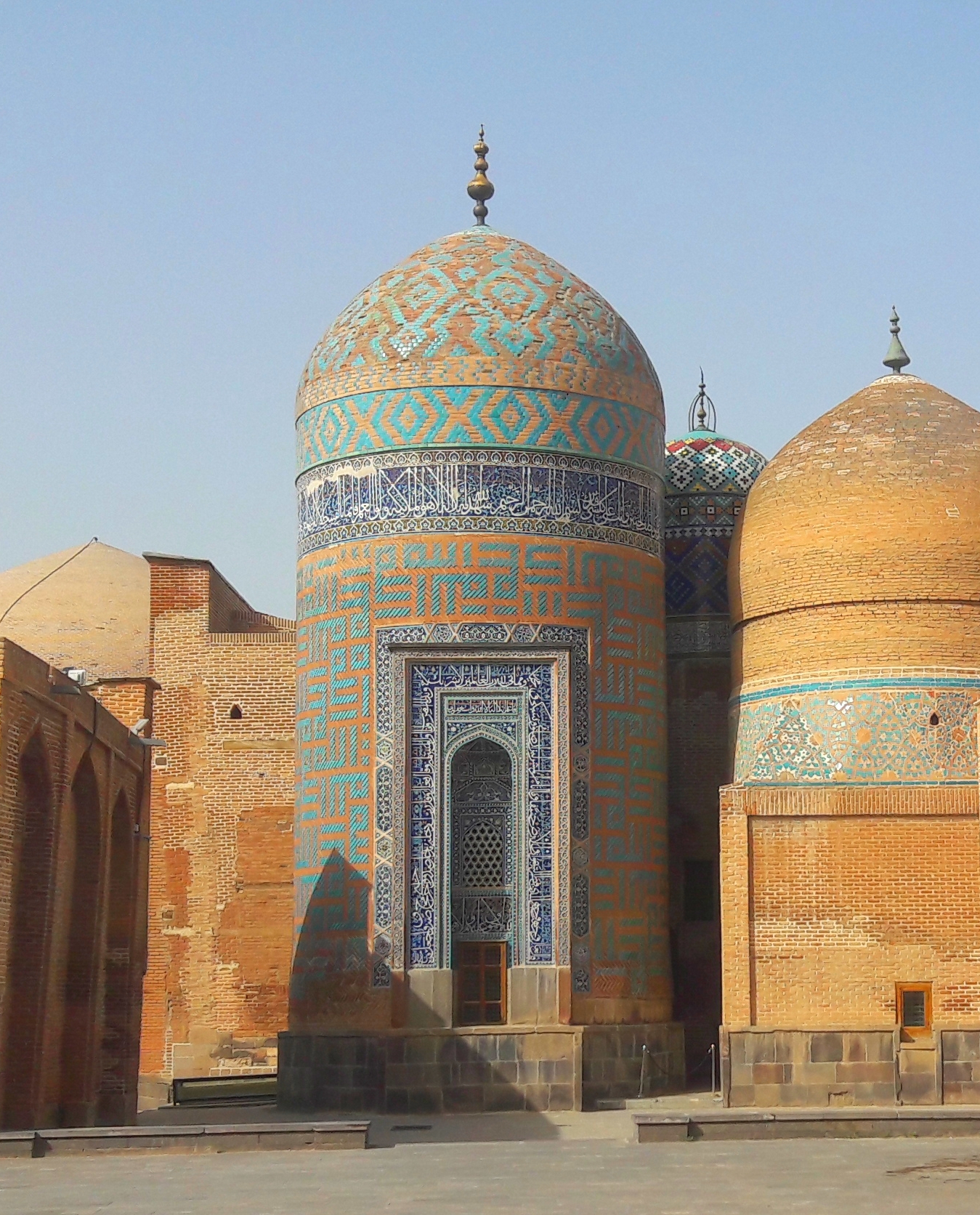
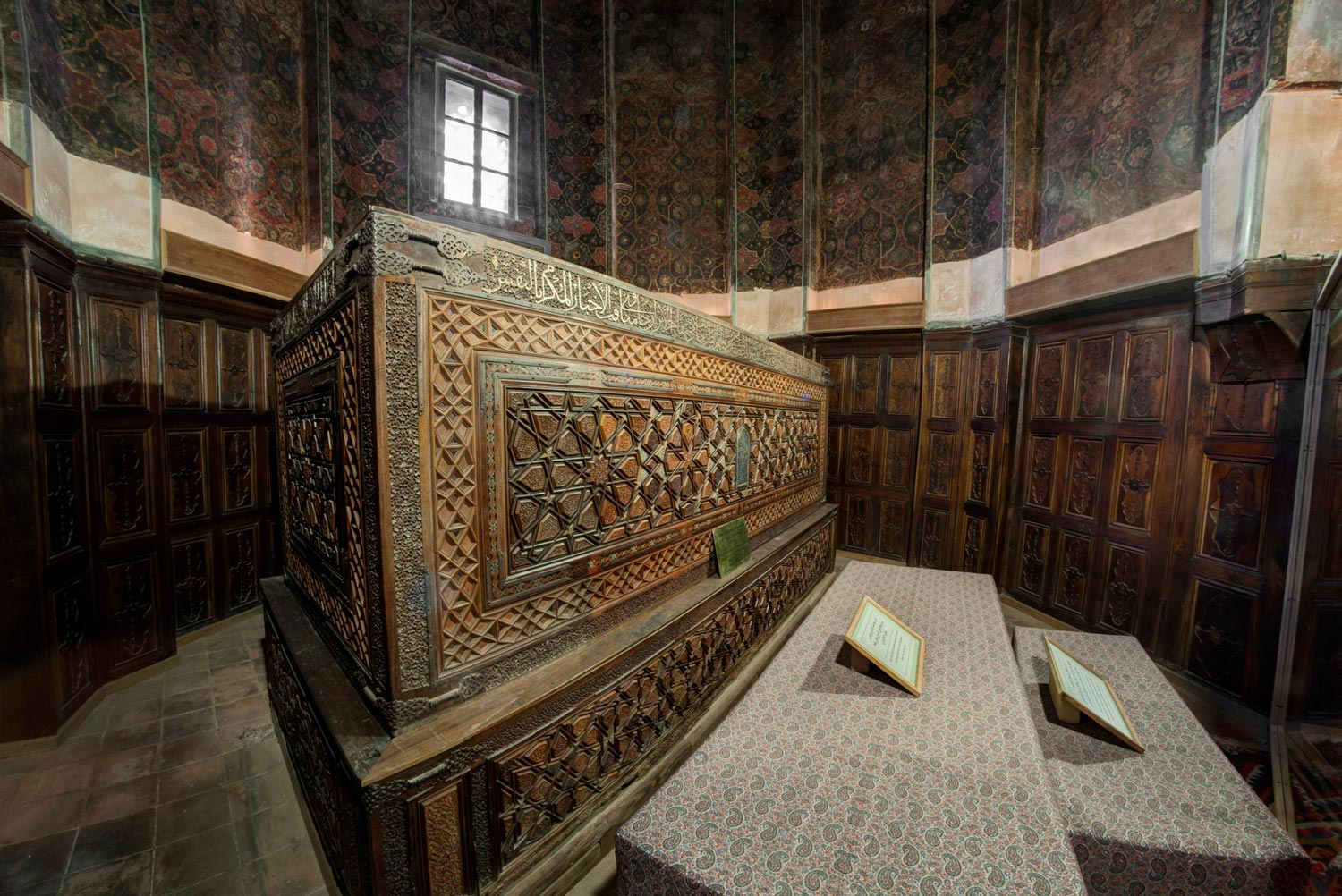
Dome tomb of Shayk Safi, built in 1335 by his son and successor Sadr al-Din Musa, in Ardabil, Iran, and casket of Shayk Safi.

== See also ==
- Safaviyya Order
- Sufism
- Safavid dynasty
- Safavid dynasty family tree

== Notes ==
Sadr al-Din Musa Murshid of the Safaviyya Sufi order
Preceded by Sheikh Safī ad-Dīn Abolfath Is'hāq Ardabilī	Leader of the Safaviyya; 1334-1391	Succeeded by Sheikh Ali Safavi
