= Zahed Gilani =

Iranian Zahediyeh Sufi Grandmaster

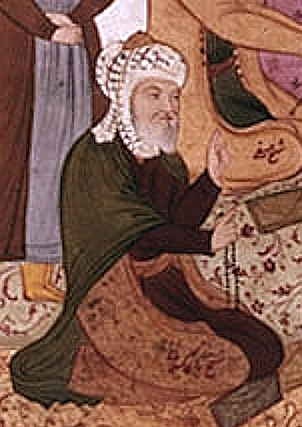

Personal life
- Born: 1218 Pensar, Ispahbad, Khwarazmian Empire
- Died: 1301 (aged 82–83) Siavarud, Ispahbad, Ilkhanate

Religious life
- Religion: Islam
- Denomination: Sunni
- Jurisprudence: Shafi'i
- Tariqa: Zahediyeh (founder)
- Creed: Ash'ari

Zahed Gilani (Note: Full name: Tāj ad-Dīn Ebrāhīm ibn Rushan Amīr al-Kurdī al-Sanjānī (Persian: تاج الدین ابراهیم بن روشن امیرالکردی سنجانی)) (Note: He is also known as Sultân-ûl Khalwatiyya, Sinjani, Tadj’ad-Dīn Ebraheem Zāheed al-Geylānī as well.) (1218 – 1301) was an Iranian Sufi grandmaster of Talysh origin and the founder of the Zahediye Sufi order in Gilan; this order became known as the Safavid order after his son-in-law Safi al-Din succeeded him.

Through his daughter's marriage to his disciple Safi al-Din, Zahed Gilani is a biological ancestor of the Safavid dynasty.

According to Minorsky and Elwell-Sutton at the Encyclopaedia of Islam, the tomb of Sheikh Zahed is situated a few miles to the south of the town of Lankaran. However, another tomb dedicated to him can be found in Lahijan.

== Life ==
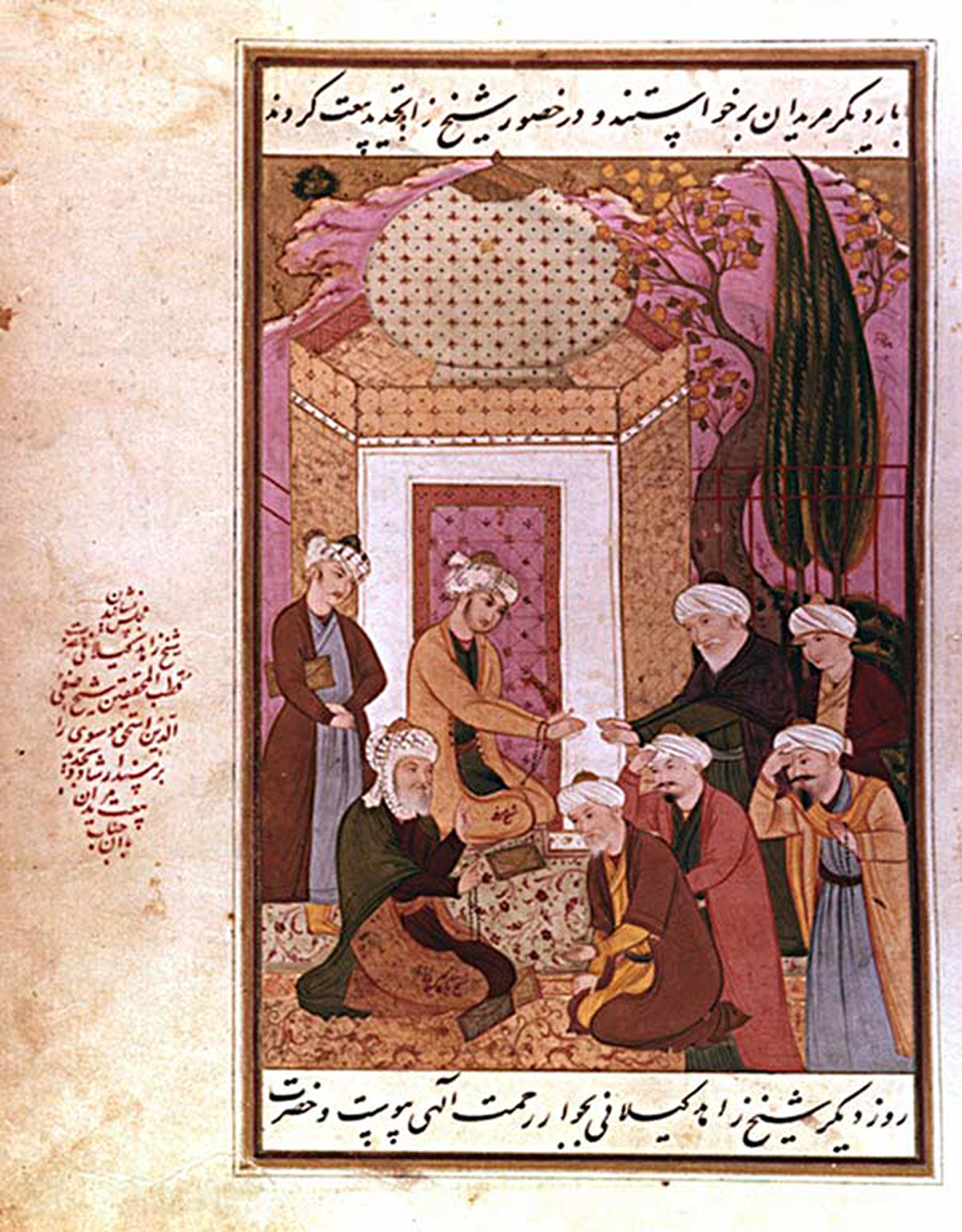
Zahed Gilani designating his son-in-law and eponym of the Safavid dynasty, Safi-ad-din Ardabili, as his spiritual successor in 1301

Zahed Gilani was probably a Talysh. Since the mid-13th century, Sheikh Zahed has been revered as a spiritual authority and his tomb near Lahijan in Iran's Gilan Province, on the shores of the Caspian Sea, draws numerous pilgrims to the village of Sheikhanvar. His ancestors came from the ancient Iranian city of Sanjan in Khorasan (located in present-day Turkmenistan). Fleeing the Seljuk invasion that would eventually conquer large parts of Iran, his ancestors settled in Gilan in the late 11th century. Taj Al-Din Zahed Gilani was able to attain cultural and religious influence on the Ilkhanid rulers (1256–1353), descendants of Genghis Khan, who followed Seljuq rule.

His most notable disciple was Safi-ad-Din Ardabili (1252–1334), the eponym of the Safavid dynasty (1501–1736). He wed Zahed's daughter Bibi Fatima and, overgoing the interest of Zahed's firstborn son, Gamal Al-Din Ali, was entrusted with the Grand Master's Zahediyeh Sufi Order, which he transformed into his own, the Safaviyya (Sufi order) Order. Zahed Gilani's second-born son, Sadr al-Dīn, wed Safi Al-Din's daughter from a previous marriage. 170 years after Safi Al-Din's death (and 200 years after the death of Sheikh Zahed Gilani) Safaviyya had gained sufficient political and military power to claim the Throne of (Northern) Iran for the Safavid Heir, Shah Ismail I Safavi. The two families were to be intertwined for many centuries to come, by blood as well as mutual spiritual causes.

The Sil-silat-al-nasab-e Safaviyeh or Genealogy of the Safavids, was written by Pir Hossein Abdul Zahedi, a 17th-century descendant of Zahed Gilani. This hagiography in praise of the Safavid forebears, was devoted to the genealogy of the Safavid Sufi masters.

The Turkish Bayrami and Jelveti orders also had their origin in Zahed Gilani's Zahediyeh Sufi Order.

== See also ==
- List of Persian poets and authors
