= Ibn Bazzaz =

Author of Safvat as-safa, disciple of Sadr al-Din Safavi

Ibn Bazzaz (Persian: ابن بزاز; fl. 1385) was the author of the Safvat as-safa, a Persian hagiography of the Sufi shaykh Safi-ad-din Ardabili (died 1334), the eponymous founder of the Safavid Sufi order. The original name of the work was al-Mawahib al-saniyya fi l-manaqib al-Safaviyya.

According to an unpublished waqf (charitable endowment) from Ardabil dated September/October 1360, Ibn Bazzaz's full name was Rukn al-Din Tavakkuli ibn Shuja al-Din Ismail ibn Haji Mahmud. He belonged to a family of cloth and fabric sellers, thus his epithet "Ibn Bazzaz". Ibn Bazzaz was a follower of Safi-ad-din Ardabili, as well as the latters son and successor Sadr al-Din Musa (died 1377/78). Ibn Bazzaz received his education at Ardabil. Some of his own writings indicate that he studied Shafi'i jurisprudence and theology with a distinguished local religious scholar and Sufi preacher, named Shams al-Din Tavakulli Va'iz Ardabili.

== Sources ==
- Ghereghlou, Kioumars (2018). "Ibn al-Bazzāz al-Ardabīlī". In Fleet, Kate; Krämer, Gudrun; Matringe, Denis; Nawas, John; Rowson, Everett (eds.). Encyclopaedia of Islam (3rd ed.). Brill Online. ISSN 1873-9830.
- Savory, Roger (1997). "Ebn Bazzāz". In Yarshater, Ehsan (ed.). Encyclopædia Iranica. Vol. VIII/1: Ebn ʿAyyāš–Economy V. London and New York: Routledge & Kegan Paul. p. 8. ISBN 978-1-56859-050-9.
