= Safvat as-safa =

Hagiography of the Sufi shaykh Safi ad-din Ardabili

The Safvat as-safa (Persian: صفوة‌الصفا), also spelled Safvat al-safa or Safwat al-safa, is a Persian hagiography of the Sufi shaykh Safi-ad-Din Ardabili (1252–1334), founder of the Safaviya sufi order.

== Author ==
The Safvat as-safa was written by Ibn Bazzaz, a disciple of Safi ad-Din's son and successor, Sadr al-Dīn Mūsā, who prompted him to write the work. He probably completed it in 1358. Little else is known of his life.

== Content ==
The work is divided into an introduction, 12 chapters, and a conclusion. Only two of the chapters (chapters 2 and 11) deal with the circumstances of his life. Most of the rest of the book recounts numerous episodes of the shaykh performing miraculous feats. The work also includes Shaykh Safi's commentaries on various passages of the Qur'an and hadith. The contents may be summarized as follows:

- Introduction: Prophecies by the Prophet Muhammad and various holy men foretelling the coming of Sheikh Safi.
- Chapter 1: Safi ad-Din's genealogy, childhood, discipleship under Sheikh Zahed Gilani, and succession to leadership of the order.
- Chapter 2: Miracles in which Shaykh Safi saved people from perilous situations in the sea, the mountains, or from enemies or illness.
- Chapter 3: Miracles motivated either by Shaykh Safi's grace or displeasure.
- Chapter 4: Safi ad-Din's explanations of difficult passages or apparent contradictions in the Qur'an and hadith.
- Chapter 5: Miracles of Safi ad-Din involving jinn, animals, and non-living things.
- Chapter 6: Safi ad-Din's practice of dhikr.
- Chapter 7: Various miracles performed by Safi ad-Din, such as reading minds, predicting the future, and contact with the dead.
- Chapter 8: Safi ad-Din's virtues and pious acts.
- Chapter 9: Safi ad-Din's final illness and death.
- Chapter 10: Miracles Safi ad-Din performed after he died.
- Chapter 11: The shaykh's greatness and fame throughout the world.
- Chapter 12: Miracles performed by Safi ad-Din's disciples.

== Safavid-era revisions ==
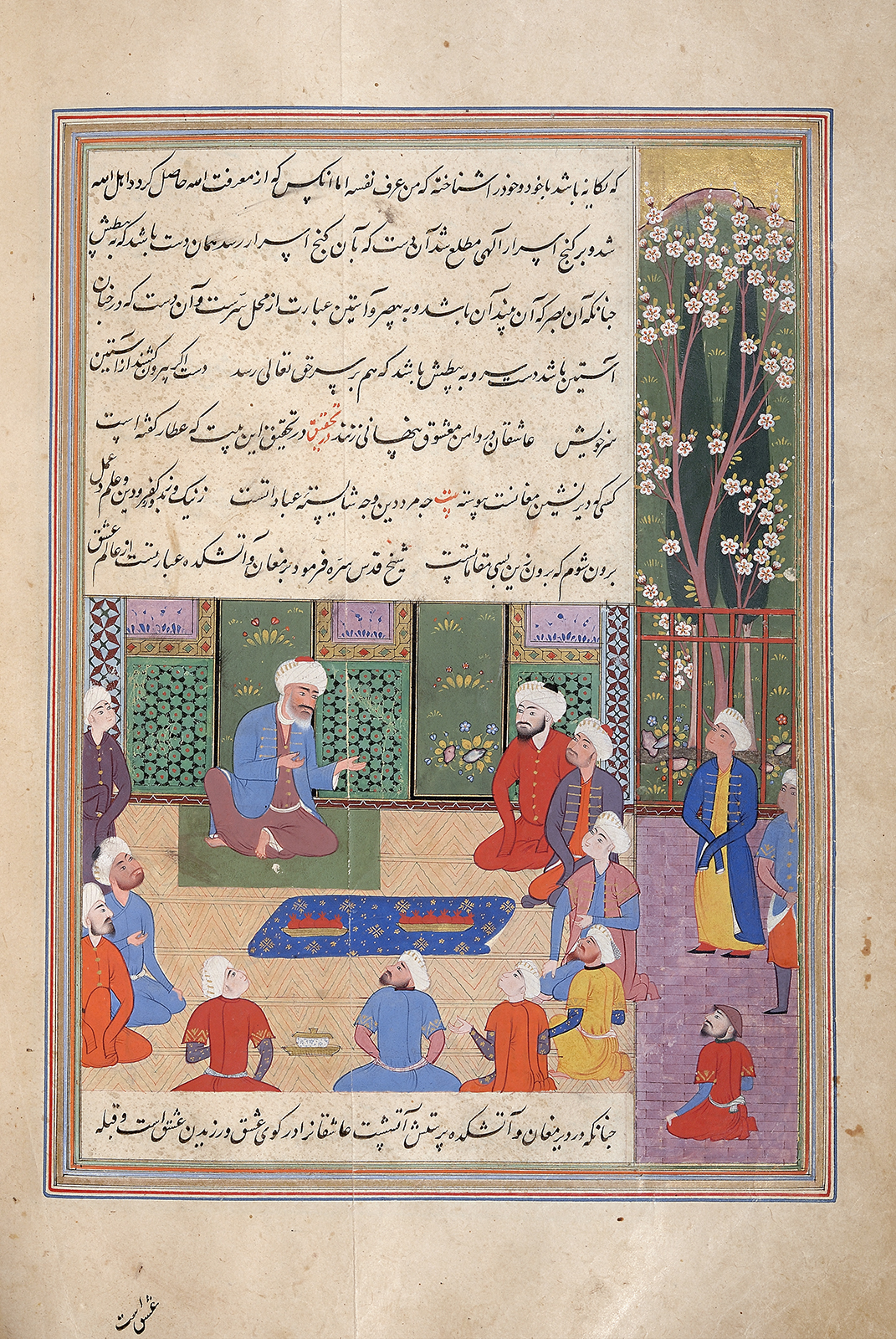
"Shaykh Safi al-Din interpreting for his disciples various verses by distinguished poets." Folio from a revised, Safavid-era edition of the Safvat al-Safa, the only extant illustrated copy of the work. Created in Shiraz, dated September 1582.

Shaykh Safi ad-Din was a Sunni and an adherent of the Shafi'i school of law. In 1501 the Sufi order he founded became the ruling family in Safavid Iran, but they converted to Shi`ism while at the same time continuing their role as head of the order. Certain elements in the Safvat as-safa, particularly Shaykh Safi's genealogy and his religious views, became inconsistent with the Safavid dynasty's self-image. Therefore, in 1542, Shah Tahmasp I (r. 1524-1576) commissioned Mir Abu al-Fat'h Husayni to revise the Safvat as-safa to give it an explicit Shi`i tone. This official version contains textual changes designed to obscure the Kurdish origins of the Safavid family and to vindicate their claim to descent from the Imams.

== Editions ==
There have been two published editions of the Safvat as-Safa. The first was a lithographed edition prepared by Mirza Ahmad ibn Hajj Karim Tabrizi and published in Bombay in 1911. This has traditionally been the standard edition used by scholars, who call it the Bombay lithograph. The second published edition appeared in 1994 in Tehran, edited by Ghulam Reza Tabataba'i Majd. Since Majd based his edition on a larger set of manuscripts of better quality, it may become the new scholarly standard.

== See also ==
- Silsilat-al-nasab-i Safaviya

== Sources ==
- Ghereghlou, Kioumars (2018). "Ibn al-Bazzāz al-Ardabīlī". In Fleet, Kate; Krämer, Gudrun; Matringe, Denis; Nawas, John; Rowson, Everett (eds.). Encyclopaedia of Islam (3rd ed.). Brill Online. ISSN 1873-9830.
