= Orand =

- Municipality
- Location within Azerbaijan
- Coordinates: 38°44′55″N 48°20′46″E
- Country: Azerbaijan
- Rayon: Lerik

Population
  - Total: 1,378
- Time zone: UTC+4 (AZT)
  - Summer (DST): UTC+5 (AZT)

Orand (also, Orant) is a village and municipality in the Lerik Rayon of Azerbaijan. It has a population of 1,378.
