= Silsilat-an-Nasab-i Safaviya =

The Silsilat-an-Nasab-i Safaviya, also spelled Selselat-an-Nasab-e Safaviyye (Persian: سلسلة النسب صفویة, meaning Genealogy of the Safavid dynasty) was written by Sheikh Pir Husayn 'Abd az-Zahidi, a 17th-century descendant of Sheikh Zahed Gilani, during the reign of Shah Suleiman I. This hagiography, in praise of the Safavid forebears, was devoted to the genealogy of Safavid Sufi masters.

== Modern scholarly context and ideological function ==
Modern historians, such as Andrew J. Newman, treat the Silsilat-an-Nasab-i Safaviya not as a purely factual record but as an important, traditional Persian-language source that must be approached with critical analysis. Since the work was composed well after the establishment of the dynasty, it is viewed as a key component of the later Safavid state's ideological project and historiographical tradition. Its ultimate function was to legitimize the ruling dynasty by reinforcing the spiritual authority of the shahs and firmly linking them to their Sufi origins, exemplified by the incorporation of poetry attributed to the dynasty's founder, Shah Ismā'īl I.

== Documentary content and regional historical records ==
Beyond its focus on genealogy, the Silsilat-an-Nasab-i Safaviya contains material on the religious-ideological power of figures like Sheikh Safi ad-Din Is`haq and broader regional history. This includes details on the plunderer invasions of Georgians into Azerbaijani cities in the early 12th century, and the reigns of the Golden Horde Janibay Sultan and Tamerlane (Timur). Crucially, the work serves as a legal-historical source by including copies of important Safavid royal decrees (farmāns), such as the one issued by Shah Tahmasp I (1559) concerning the custodianship (mutavalli) of Sheikh Zahid Gilani's successors, and the decree by Shah Abbas I (1600) appointing Sheikh Abdal Zahidi Pirzade to the property of the Sheikh Safi Mausoleum in Ardabil.
