= Xallıcalı =

- Municipality
- Location within Azerbaijan
- Coordinates: 39°03′50″N 48°45′28″E
- Country: Azerbaijan
- Rayon: Masally

Population
  - Total: 738
- Time zone: UTC+4 (AZT)
  - Summer (DST): UTC+5 (AZT)

Xallıcalı (also known as Khallydzhaly and Khalydzhaly) is a village and municipality in the Masally Rayon of Azerbaijan. It has a population of 738.
