= Shindan Castle =

Castle in Gilan Province, Iran

- قلعه شیندان
- Interactive map of the Shindan Castle area

General information
- Type: Castle
- Location: Astara County, Iran, Azerbaijan

Shindan Castle (Persian: قلعه شیندان) is a historical castle located on the border of the Republic of Azerbaijan and Iran. The fortress dates back to before the advent of Islam.
