= Mughan (province) =

Province of the Abbasid Caliphate, in present-day Iranian Azerbaijan

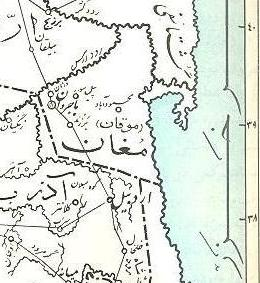
Mugan State in Abbasid Caliphate

Mughan was a province of the Abbasid Caliphate, in present-day Iranian Azerbaijan and Republic of Azerbaijan. The capital was Bajravan. Other cities were Barzand, Pilsavar, Mahmood Abad and Dezhman. Mughan State was located west of Caspian Sea and south of the Aras river, encompassing the namesake plains region.
