= Safavid dynasty =

Twelver Shīʿa ruling dynasty of Iran (1501–1736)

Safavid dynasty دودمان صفوی
- Safavid flag after 1576
- Parent family: Safi al-Din Ardabili
- Country: Safavid Iran
- Origin: Ardabil, Iran
- Founded: 22 December 1501
- Founder: Ismail I (1501–1524)
- Final ruler: Abbas III (1732–1736)
- Titles: Shahanshah of Iran; Shadow of God; Soltan; Mirza
- Traditions: Twelver Shia Islam
- Dissolution: c. 1736
- Cadet branches: Sheykhavand

The Safavid dynasty (/ˈsæ.fə.vɪd, ˈsɑː.-/; Persian: دودمان صفوی, romanized: Dudmân-e Safavi, pronounced [d̪uːd̪ˈmɒːne sæfæˈviː]) was the ruling dynasty of Safavid Iran, and one of Iran's most significant ruling dynasties reigning from 1501 to 1736. Their rule is often considered the beginning of modern Iranian history, as well as one of the gunpowder empires. The Safavid Shah Ismail I established the Twelver denomination of Shi'a Islam as the official religion of the Persian Empire, marking one of the most important turning points in the history of Islam. The Safavid dynasty had its origin in the Safavid Sufi order, which was established in the city of Ardabil in the Azerbaijan region. It was an Iranian dynasty of Kurdish origin, but during their rule they intermarried with Turkoman, Georgian, Circassian, and Pontic Greek dignitaries; nevertheless, for practical purposes, they were not only Persian-speaking, but also Turkish-speaking and Turkified. From their base in Ardabil, the Safavids established control over parts of Greater Iran and reasserted the Iranian identity of the region, thus becoming the first native dynasty since the Sasanian Empire to establish a national state officially known as Iran.

The Safavids ruled from 1501 to 1722 (experiencing a brief restoration from 1729 to 1736 and 1750 to 1773) and, at their height, controlled all of what is now Iran, Azerbaijan, Bahrain, Armenia, eastern Georgia, parts of the North Caucasus including Russia, Iraq, Kuwait, and Afghanistan, as well as parts of Turkey, Syria, Pakistan, Turkmenistan, and Uzbekistan.

Despite their demise in 1736, the legacy that they left behind was the revival of Iran as an economic stronghold between East and West, the establishment of an efficient state and bureaucracy based upon "checks and balances", their architectural innovations, and patronage for fine arts. The Safavids have also left their mark down to the present era by establishing Twelver Shi'ism as the state religion of Iran, as well as spreading Shi'a Islam in major parts of the West Asia, Central Asia, Caucasus, Anatolia, the Persian Gulf, and Mesopotamia.

== Genealogy ==
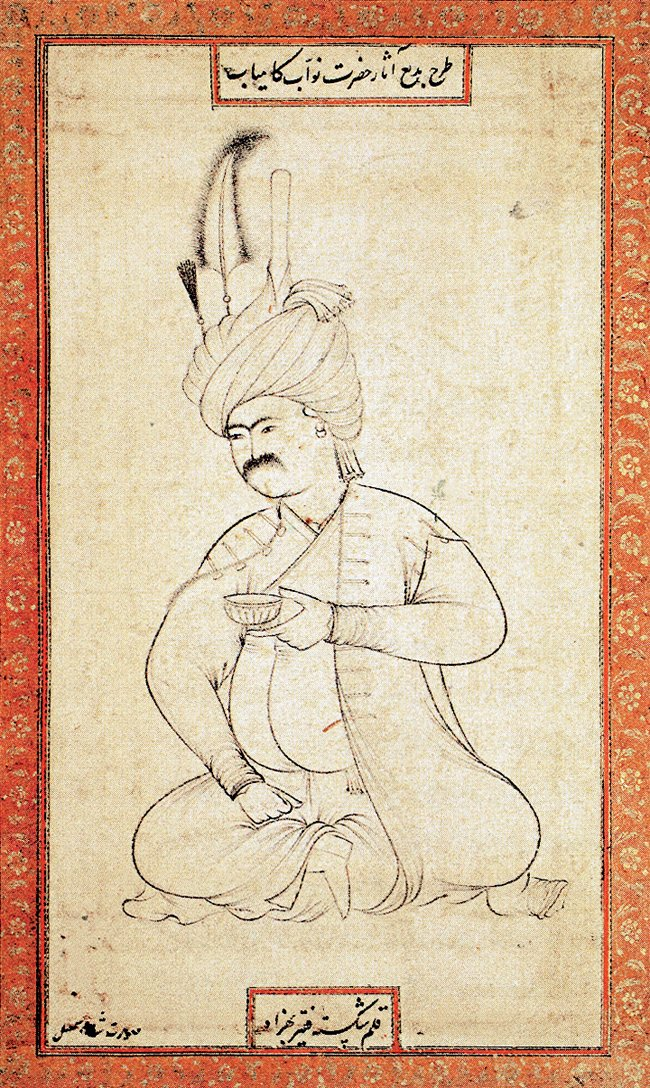
Portrait of Shah Ismail I, painted from life by Kamal al-din Behzad, his director of the royal atelier (posthumous copy). Topkapı Palace Museum, H.2169.

The Safavid Kings themselves claimed to be sayyids, family descendants of the Islamic prophet Muhammad, although many scholars have cast doubt on this claim. There seems now to be a consensus among scholars that the Safavid family hailed from Iranian Kurdistan, and later moved to Iranian Azerbaijan, finally settling in the 11th century CE at Ardabil. Traditional pre-1501 Safavid manuscripts trace the lineage of the Safavids to the Kurdish dignitary, Firuz-Shah Zarrin-Kolah.

According to historians, including Vladimir Minorsky and Roger Savory, the Safavids were Turkish speakers of Iranian origin:

From the evidence available at the present time, it is certain that the Safavid family was of indigenous Iranian stock, and not of Turkish ancestry as it is sometimes claimed. It is probable that the family originated in Persian Kurdistan, and later moved to Azerbaijan, where they adopted the Azari form of Turkish spoken there, and eventually settled in the small town of Ardabil sometimes during the eleventh century.

By the time of the establishment of the Safavid empire, the members of the family were Turkicized and Turkish-speaking, and some of the Shahs composed poems in their then-native Turkish language. Concurrently, the Shahs themselves also supported Persian literature, poetry and art projects including the grand Shahnameh of Shah Tahmasp, while members of the family and some Shahs composed Persian poetry as well.

The authority of the Safavids was religiously based, and their claim to legitimacy was founded on being direct male descendants of Ali, the cousin and son-in-law of Muhammad, and regarded by the Shiʻa as the first Imam.

Furthermore, the dynasty was from the very start thoroughly intermarried with both Pontic Greek as well as Georgian lines. In addition, from the official establishment of the dynasty in 1501, the dynasty would continue to have many intermarriages with both Circassian as well as again Georgian dignitaries, especially with the accession of Tahmasp I.

== Revision of the family genealogy ==
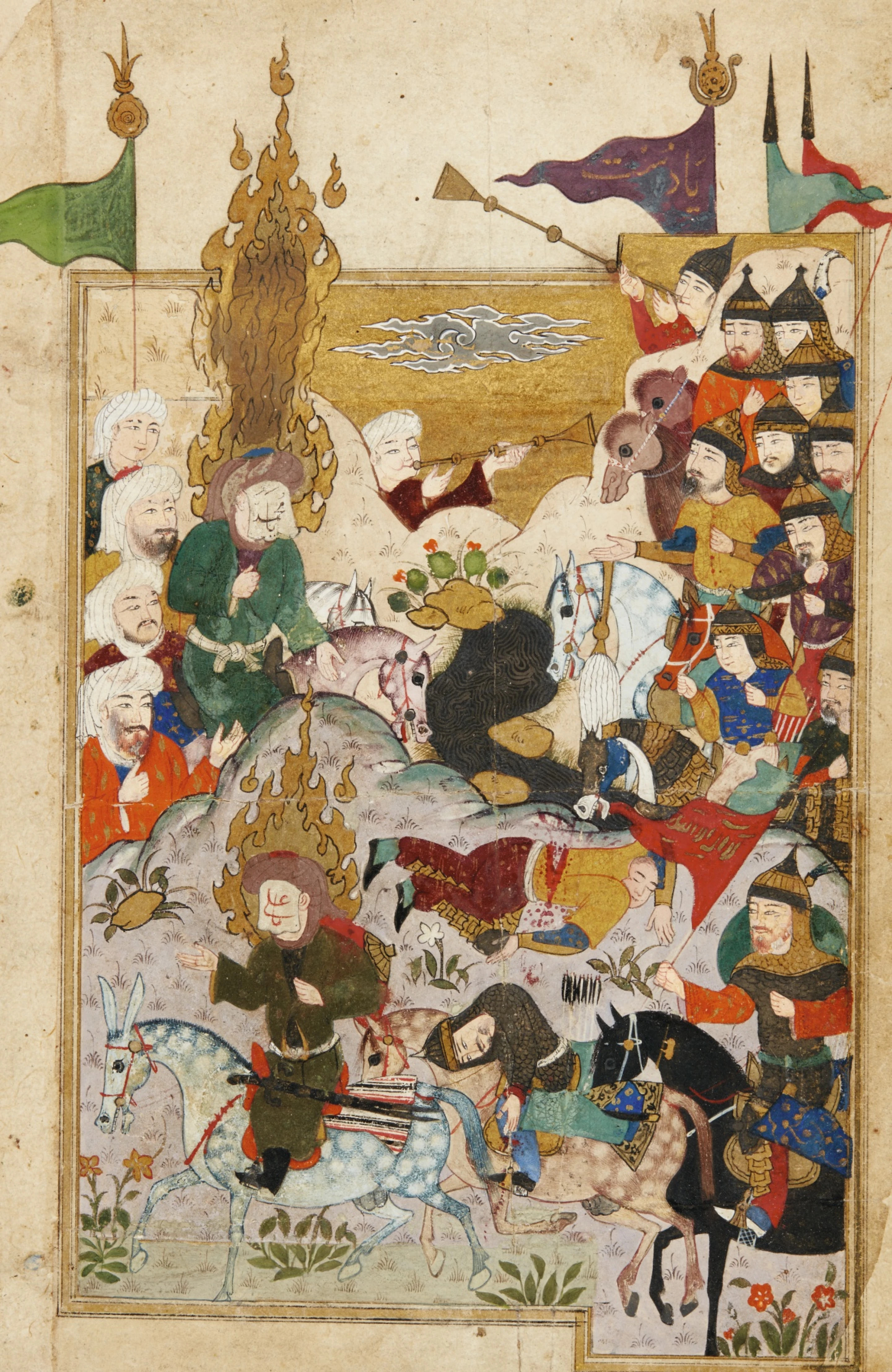
Muhammad and Ali in battle. Made in Safavid Iran during the 16th century

The source of legitimacy changed from the Chinggisids to the Alids when the Safavids captured the Iranian throne in 1501. The exact Alid ancestry of the Safavids had not yet been formally recorded in their genealogical tree when Ismail I declared his support to Shia Islam in 1501. Leaders of the Safavid order had already claimed ancestry from Muhammad's family during their revolutionary phase in 1447–1501. It was during this period that they altered the Safvat al-safa, a hagiography of Safi al-Din Ardabili composed by Ibn Bazzaz in 1350. The Sunni Kurdish background of the Safavids was changed to Arab descent from Muhammad during the first series of alterations. Although their full lineage was not made clear.

When he was first establishing his rule, Ismail I highlighted in his poems that he was descended from Husayn ibn Ali by writing "I am a Husayni, my curse upon Yazid," and signing his name as "Ismail ibn Haydar al-Husayni". In 1508, the Safvat al-safa was altered again, this time connecting Safi al-Din Ardabili's lineage to the seventh imam Musa al-Kazim. Despite this, Ismail I showed little inclination to follow the official doctrines of Shia Islam, as demonstrated in his use of pre-Islamic Persian words and references in his poems. The Safavid claim to be descended from Husayn ibn Ali and Musa al-Kazim was further strengthened under Tahmasp I. He rejected his father's claim as messiah, and established a more pragmatic interpretation of Shia Islam that was more in line with Islamic scriptures.

== Self-identification and worldview ==
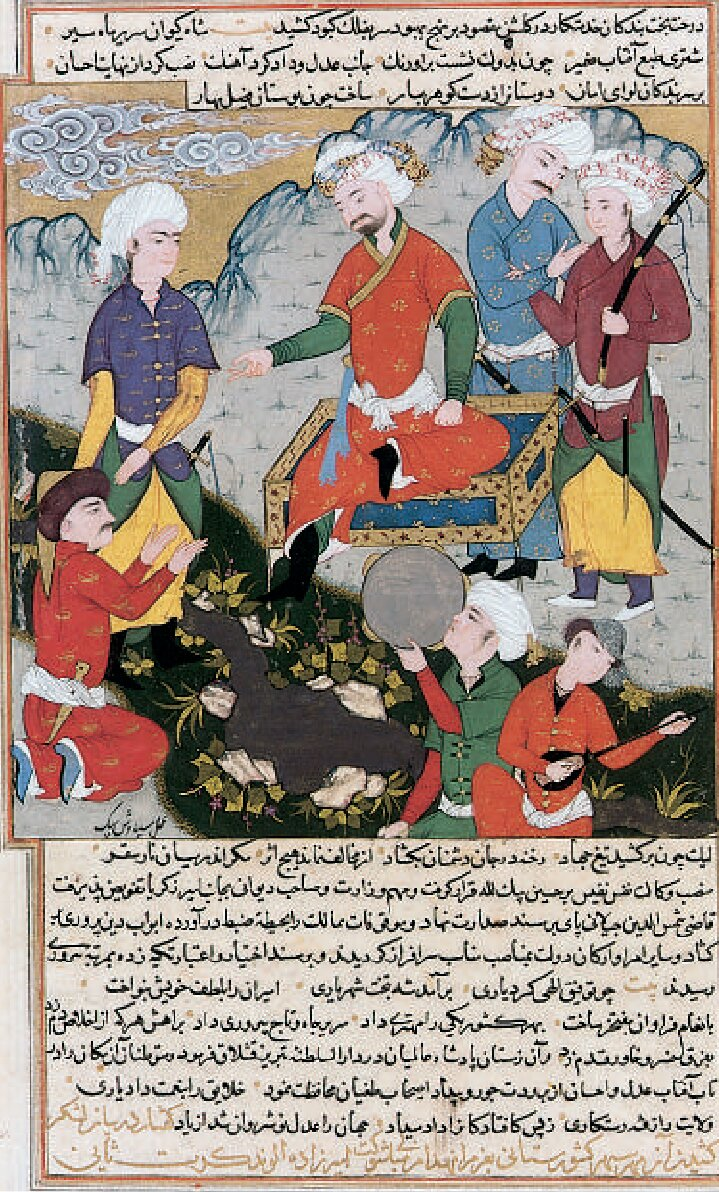
Scene of Timur enthroned, from a copy of the Habib al-siyar, made in Qazvin in 1579/80

The identity created by the Safavid monarchs and the Persian-speaking urban elites who backed them was based on religion. The Safavids portrayed themselves as the rightful successors of the Twelve Imams in Shia Islam and reinforced this claim through their fabricated genealogical link to the third Shia Imam, Husayn ibn Ali, through his supposed marriage to Shahrbanu, the daughter of last Sasanian ruler Yazdegerd III. By constructing this lineage, the Safavids emphasized their Persian genealogical heritage.

The Safavids also drew inspiration from earlier times, both historical and mythological. The historical component was the Turco-Mongol tradition, which the Safavids considered themselves the inheritor of. The 14th century warlord Timur influenced their self-image. In his autobiography, Shah Tahmasp I mentioned that he often read the Tarikh-e Teymur. This romanticized past was given renewed attention once the Safavids abandoned their role as warriors.

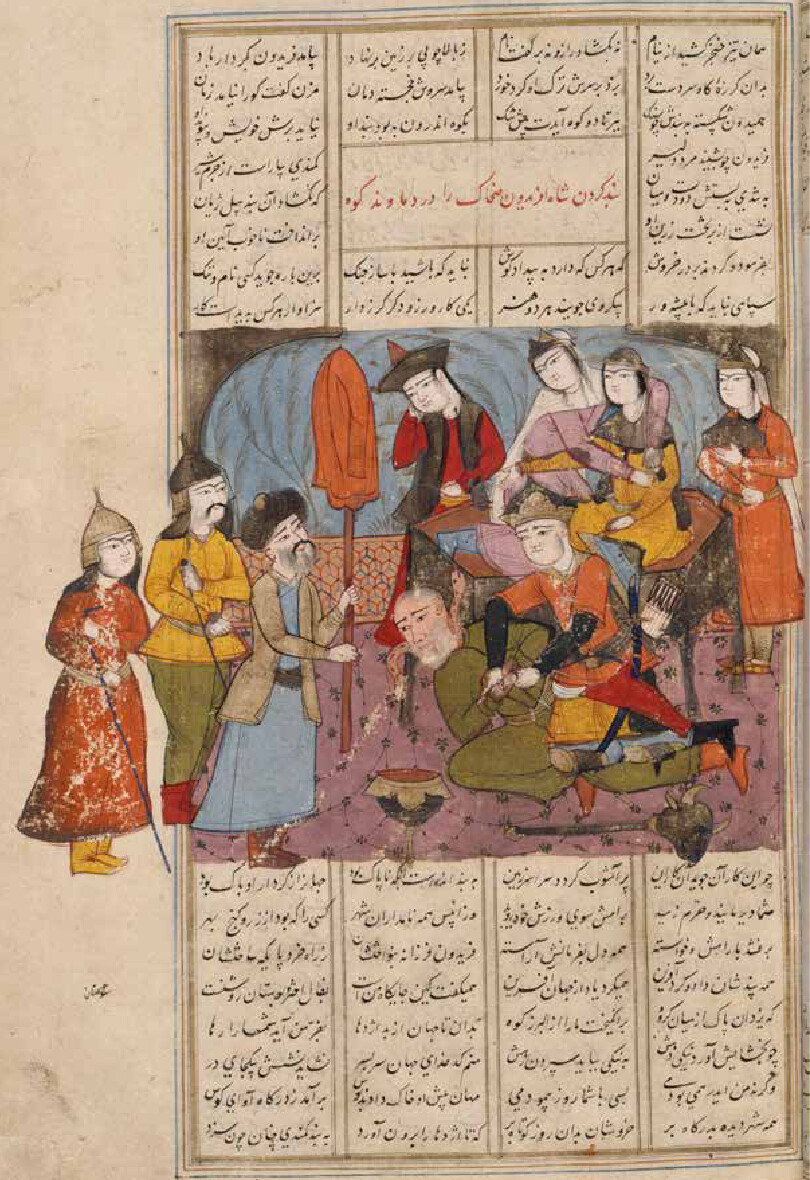
Zahhak bound by Fereydun, whilst Kaveh the Blacksmith is holding a apron-banner (Derafsh Kaviani). From a mid-17th century Safavid miniature

The mythological component was references to pre-Islamic kings and heroes. Zahhak, Fereydun and Jamshid were amongst the figures that Shah Ismail I compared himself to in his poetry. His two sons Sam and Rostam, had traditional Persian names. When Shah Soltan Hoseyn was crowned shah in 1694, Jamshid and Kay Kawad were amongst the pre-Islamic figures mentioned in the khotba speech by the sheykh al-islam of Isfahan, Mohammad Baqer Majlesi. The Tohfat al-alam, a paean to Shah Soltan Hoseyn composed about ten years after his coronation, contains similar themes. Although many dynasties in Iran remembered only fractions of the past, they still aimed to claim a connection to it, a tradition the Safavids continued. The Dutch Iranologist Rudi Matthee adds "Yet that does not mean that the Safavids were engaged in a systematic and comprehensive mining of the past with the intention of "retrieving" an authentic identity".

The identity of the Safavids was broad in certain aspects, consistent with premodern custom. The Safavid dynasty was likely of Kurdish origin, while Shah Ismail I had Pontic Greek descent and spoke a variant of Azerbaijani Turkic. Both Rudi Matthee and English–American Iranologist Dick Davis agree that "pure identity was not part of Iran's early, multi-ethnic and imperial consciousness and emerged only in Sasanian times". The Safavids still set themselves apart from others, mainly judging by perceived levels of civilization. Those considered barbarians were not only outsiders but also certain neighboring Muslims, including Arabs, Turks, and Kurds. Texts in Persian portrayed them all as primitive, unpredictable and unreliable. The Safavids considered the truly uncivilized groups to include the Turkmens, Lezgins, Kipchaks, and Uzbeks. This grouping also included the Russians, whom the Iranians reportedly called the "Uzbeks of Europe". The Safavid outlook on civilization also included Western Europeans, albeit they were rarely mentioned in Persian texts. These texts make little mention of Europe (Farangestan) as a competitor, threat, or point of comparison, even long after the Safavid dynasty. Secondary sources, typically from Europe, provide the majority of the information regarding Safavid views on Europeans.

Legitimacy in the Safavid chronicles revolved around support for the shah and his associates, not adherence to the Muslim divine order or ties to the land. In this system, loyalty became the key and nearly exclusive condition for inclusion. The clerical elite in Iran justified this perspective in religious terms, seeing the dynasty and its shah as essential to upholding and safeguarding the divine order.

== Culture ==
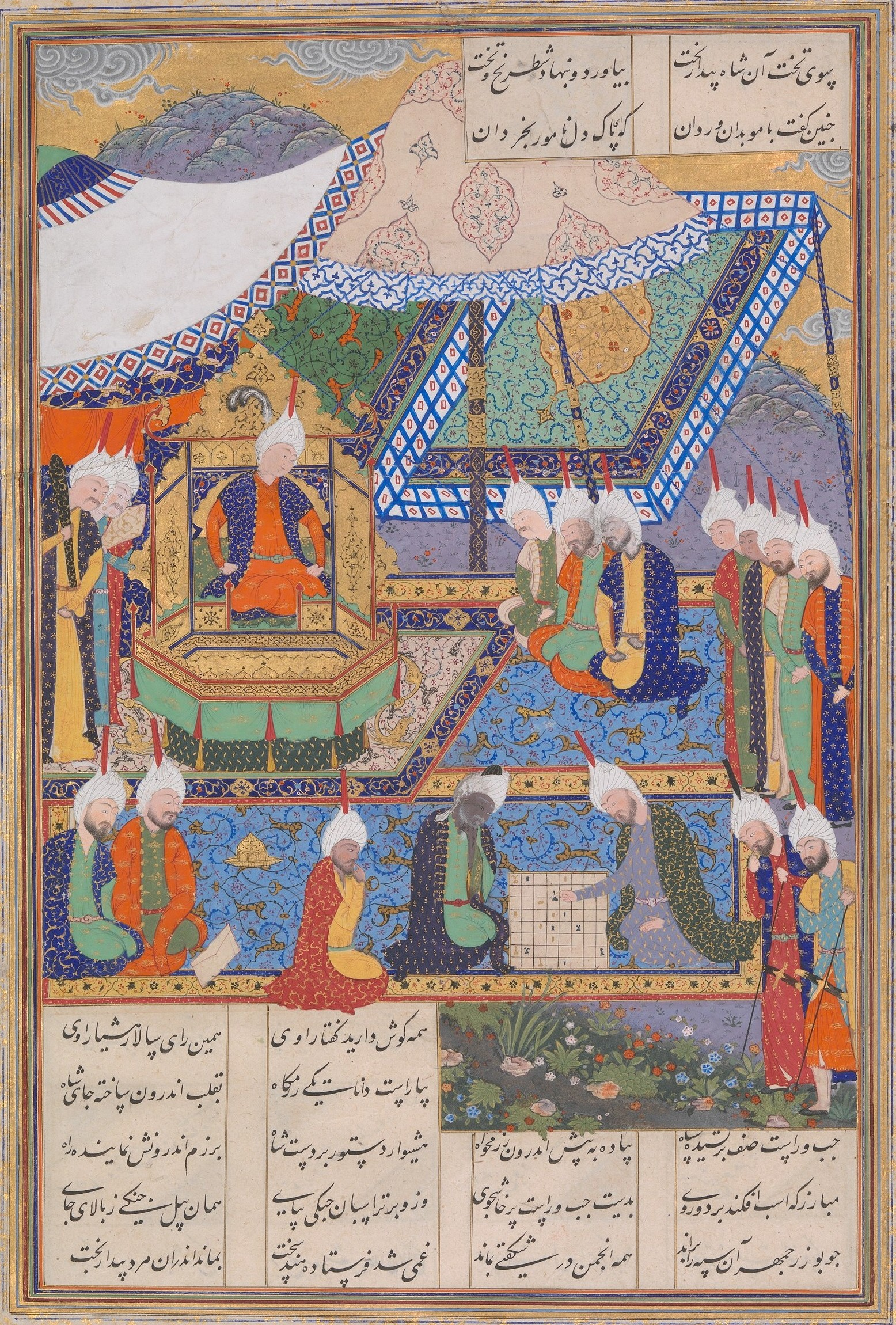
"Buzurjmihr Masters the Hindu Game of Chess", from the Shahnameh of Shah Tahmasp, dated c. 1530–35

After the fall of the Sasanian Empire in the 7th century, the idea of Iran as a political state ceased to exist, but it continued to shape Iranian national sentiment. Under the Mongol Ilkhanate (1256–1335), this notion was revived. After settling firmly in Iran, the Mongols actively supported its cultural heritage, centering their patronage on the Shahnameh. This development was aided by the emergence of the New Persian language as the predominant cultural language in this large region. During the Safavid period, these factors came together, and the Safavids collected and directed centuries of cultural achievements. This preserved heritage proved resilient, enduring both the turmoil after the Safavid government collapsed and the aggressive rise of Russian culture following the early 19th century Russo-Iranian Wars.

Especially in urban areas, Safavid literature and Persian poetry connected the past, including the pre-Islamic past, to the present and functioned as a body of shared cultural traditions for both the common people and the elite. The legendary pre-Islamic Iranian past, with kings battling eternal forces of evil in Iran's national epic, the Shahnameh, was connected to the Islamic Safavid present, which had its own strong symbols of righteousness and redemption.

The Safavids revitalized the Guarded Domains of Iran. The idea of the "Guarded Domains" was formed by a feeling of territorial and political uniformity in a society with shared cultural elements such as the Persian language, monarchy, and Shia Islam. In addition to supporting an advanced Persian material culture, the Safavids contributed to the development of an Islamic philosophical and theological heritage. The Safavids established trade and diplomatic ties with Europe, introducing Iran to Western developments for the first time.

The Safavid dynasty regarded Iran, both as a territory and as a concept, as under their rule and divinely protected. The name "Iran" occurs rarely in early chronicles, suggesting that its location was considered too evident to require frequent mention. The attention to "Iran" as a unified entity, shielded by the Iranian army, increased somewhat under the reign of Shah Abbas I, who defended the country from external opponents while reducing the autonomy of outlying areas and islands. Iran, seemingly, was recognized without formal proclamation. Over the following 500 years, Iranian-Shia identity was grounded in the simultaneous observance of Ashura (mourning the death of Husayn ibn Ali) and Nowruz (Iranian New Year), a combination consolidated under the Safavids.

== Regnal titles ==
Like their Aq Qoyunlu predecessors, the Safavids used the title of Shahanshah (King of Kings) of Iran. The Safavids were referred to through various titles by the Ottoman sultans, such as "king of Iranian lands", "sultan of the lands of Iran", "the king of kings of Iran, the lord of the Persians" and the "holders of the glory of Jamshid and the vision of Fereydun and the wisdom of Dara."

== Legacy and assessment ==
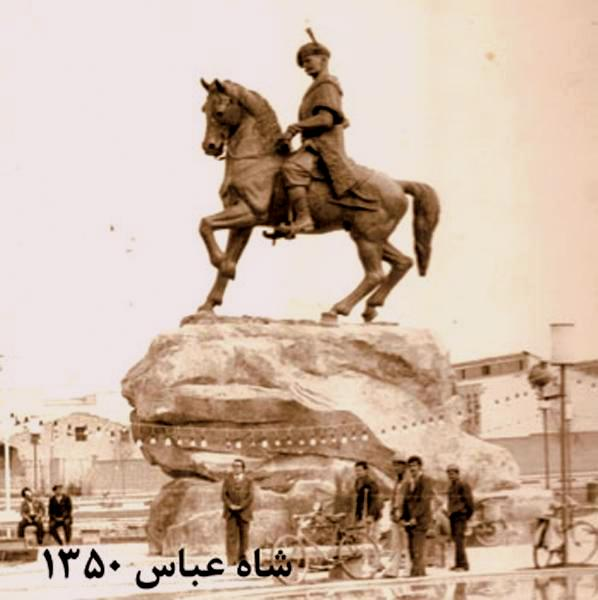
A statue of Shah Abbas I, which was on display in Isfahan before the Iranian Revolution

Iran's modern period is often linked to the Safavid dynasty, which also laid the groundwork for the Iranian nation-state. Under them, Iran became a unified political entity, while its largely tribal and nomadic population became settled, relying on agriculture and trade for revenue. Patrimonial kingship, which combined territorial authority with religious legitimacy, was introduced by the Safavids and, with some modifications, endured until the 20th century.

The political system that emerged under them had overlapping political and religious boundaries and a core language, Persian, which served as the literary tongue, and even began to replace Arabic for theological conversation. Well into the Qajar era, some administrative institutions established during the Safavid era or modified from earlier periods continued to exist. Iran and Europe first began regular, long-term diplomatic and commercial exchanges during the Safavid era.

The Reformation in northern and central Europe and the Counter-Reformation that followed it are comparable to the state-sponsored Shia Islam that resulted from the advent of the Safavids and the Sunni response to it. The split that resulted between the Sunnis and Shias is similar to the Protestant-Catholic split that accelerated the formation of nation-states in Europe. The emergence of the Safavid state and its adoption of Shia Islam as the official faith was a pivotal moment that significantly affected both Iran and the surrounding Sunni-majority regions. The conversion to a state-sponsored religion, in this case Shia Islam, provided the bond required to hold together the fundamental elements of Safavid state, similar to other early states such as Spain and England. Iran was largely shaped into a geographical empire with a unique identity due to the fusion of religious and political elements by the Safavid dynasty.

== Safavid Shahs of Iran ==
Safavid dynasty timeline

- Ismail I 1501–1524
- Tahmasp I 1524–1576
- Ismail II 1576–1578
- Mohammad Khodabanda 1578–1587
- Abbas I 1587–1629
- Safi 1629–1642
- Abbas II 1642–1666
- Suleiman I 1666–1694
- Soltan Hoseyn 1694–1722
- Tahmasp II 1722–1732
- Abbas III 1732–1736

== Cadet branches ==
Despite efforts undertaken by Safavid shahs in subduing their familial branches, namely confining princes to the harem, the Bahrami-Safavid line held considerable power from 1517 to 1593, and in the face of pressure from Shah Abbas the Great for centralisation, migrated to India in the 1590s. They were the descendants of Bahram Mirza Safavi, son of Ismail I, and among their principal members were Rustam Mirza Safavi, an influential subahdar and courtier, and two wives of the Mughal emperors, Dilras Banu Begum and Kandahari Begum. They survived in India for two centuries.

== See also ==
- Khanates of the Caucasus
- List of Shi'a Muslim dynasties
- Persianate states
- Safavid art
- Safavid conversion of Iran to Shia Islam
- Trade in Iran's Safavid era

== Sources ==
- Amanat, Abbas (1997). Pivot of the Universe: Nasir Al-Din Shah Qajar and the Iranian Monarchy, 1831–1896. I.B. Tauris. ISBN 978-1845118280.
- Amanat, Abbas (2017). Iran: A Modern History. Yale University Press. ISBN 978-0300112542.
- Amanat, Abbas (2019). "Remembering the Persianate". In Amanat, Abbas; Ashraf, Assef (eds.). The Persianate World: Rethinking a Shared Sphere. Brill. pp. 15–62. ISBN 978-90-04-38728-7.
- Amanat, Abbas (2025). "Border Crossings: Iranian Artists in Tsarist Russia and Georgia". In Amanat, Abbas; Gledhill, Kevin; Nejad, Kayhan A. (eds.). The Caspian World: Connections and Contentions at a Modern Eurasian Crossroads. Cornell University Press. pp. 16–48. ISBN 978-1501781292.
- Ashraf, Ahmad (2006). "Iranian Identity iii. Medieval Islamic Period". In Yarshater, Ehsan (ed.). Encyclopædia Iranica (Online ed.). Encyclopædia Iranica Foundation. ISBN 978-0933273955.
- Ashraf, Assef (2024). Making and Remaking Empire in Early Qajar Iran. Cambridge University Press. ISBN 978-1009361552.
- Babayan, Kathryn (2002). Mystics, Monarchs and Messiahs: Cultural Landscapes of Early Modern Iran. Harvard University Press. ISBN 978-0932885289.
- Blow, David (2009). Shah Abbas: The Ruthless King Who Became an Iranian Legend. I.B. Tauris. ISBN 978-0857716767.
- Dale, Stephen Frederic (2020). "Turks, Turks and türk Turks: Anatolia, Iran and India in Comparative Perspective". In Peacock, A.C.S.; McClary, Richard Piran (eds.). Turkish History and Culture in India: Identity, Art and Transregional Connections. Brill. pp. 56–87. doi:10.1163/9789004437364_004. ISBN 978-90-04-43736-4.
- Geevers, Liesbeth (2015). "Safavid Cousins on the Verge of Extinction: Dynastic Centralization in Central Asia and the Bahrāmī Collateral Line (1517-1593)". Journal of the Economic and Social History of the Orient. 58 (3). Leiden: Brill: 293–326. doi:10.1163/15685209-12341376. ISSN 1568-5209. JSTOR 43919246. OCLC 46849781.
- Jackson, Peter; Lockhart, Laurence, eds. (1986). The Timurid and Safavid Periods. The Cambridge History of Iran. Vol. 6. Cambridge: Cambridge University Press. ISBN 978-0521200943.
- Lane, George (2019). "The idea of Iran". In Babaie, Sussan (ed.). Iran After the Mongols. Bloomsbury Publishing. pp. 7–32. ISBN 978-1788315289.
- Khanbaghi, Aptin (2006). The Fire, the Star and the Cross: Minority Religions in Medieval and Early Modern Iran. I.B. Tauris. ISBN 978-1845110567.
- Matthee, Rudi (2008). "Safavid dynasty". In Yarshater, Ehsan (ed.). Encyclopædia Iranica (Online ed.). Encyclopædia Iranica Foundation. ISBN 978-0933273948.
- Matthee, Rudi (2009). "Was Safavid Iran an Empire?". Journal of the Economic and Social History of the Orient. 53 (1–2). Brill: 233–265. doi:10.1163/002249910X12573963244449.
- Matthee, Rudi (2021). "The idea of Iran in the Safavid period: Dynastic pre-eminence and Urban Pride". In Melville, Charles (ed.). Safavid Persia in the Age of Empires: The Idea of Iran. Vol. 10. I.B. Tauris. pp. 81–105.
- Melville, Charles (2019). "Concepts of government and state formation in Mongol Iran". In Babaie, Sussan (ed.). Iran After the Mongols. Bloomsbury Publishing. pp. 33–54. ISBN 978-1788315289.
- Mikaberidze, Alexander (2015). Historical Dictionary of Georgia (2 ed.). Rowman & Littlefield. ISBN 978-1442241466.
- Savory, Roger (2007). Iran under the Safavids. Cambridge University Press. ISBN 978-0521042512.
- Sicker, Martin (2001). The Islamic World in Decline: From the Treaty of Karlowitz to the Disintegration of the Ottoman Empire. Greenwood Publishing Group. ISBN 978-0275968915.
- Yarshater, Ehsan (2001). Encyclopædia Iranica. Routledge & Kegan Paul. ISBN 978-0933273566.
- Yarshater, Ehsan (2012). "IRAN ii. IRANIAN HISTORY (2) Islamic period (page 4): The Safavids". Encyclopaedia Iranica. "The origins of the Safavids are clouded in obscurity. They may have been of Kurdish origin (see R. Savory, Iran Under the Safavids, 1980, p. 2; R. Matthee, "Safavid Dynasty" at iranica.com), but for all practical purposes they were Turkish-speaking and Turkified."

— Royal house — Safavid dynasty Founding year: 1501 Deposition: 1736
Preceded by House of Sasan	1501–1736	Succeeded by House of Afsharid
