= Ərçivan =

Ərçivan Arčion
- Municipality
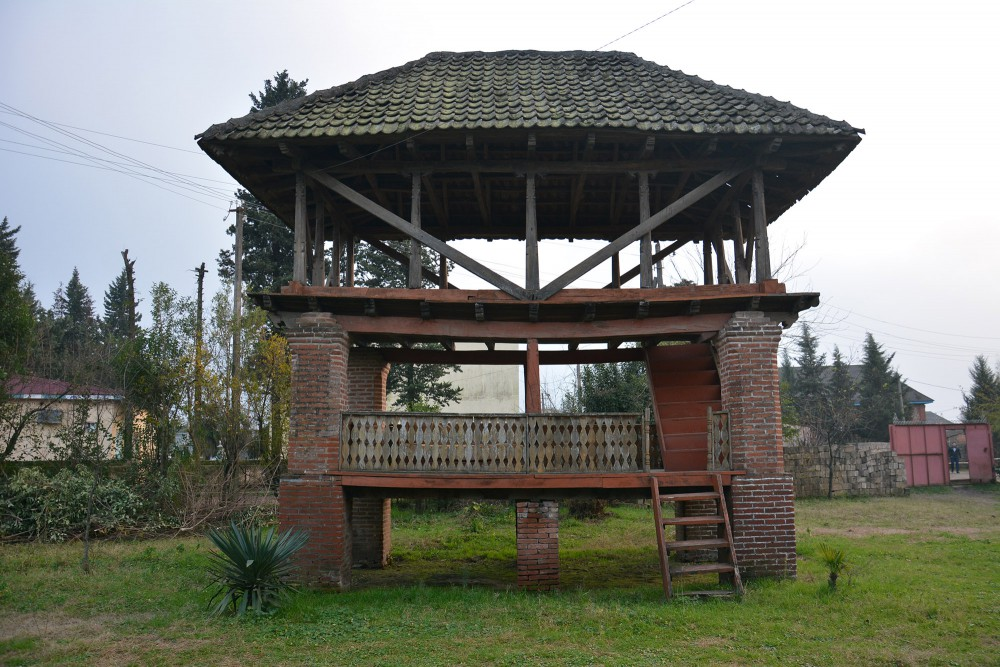
- Historic settlement in Ərçivan

- Location within Azerbaijan
- Coordinates: 38°30′10″N 48°50′02″E
- Country: Azerbaijan
- Rayon: Astara

Population
  - Total: 8,084
- Time zone: UTC+4 (AZT)

Ərçivan (Talysh: Arčion) is a village and the most populous municipality, except the capital Astara, in the Astara Rayon of Azerbaijan. It has a population of 8,084.
