= Doublure =

Doublure may refer to:

- Doublure (bookbinding), ornamental endleaf of a book
- Doublure (biology), reflexed margin of a trilobite's carapace
