= Kitab-i Diyarbakriyya =

Work of history on the Aq Qoyunlu and Qara Qoyunlu

Ketāb-e Dīārbakrīya (Persian: كتاب دياربكرية) is a book on the history of the Aq Qoyunlu and Qara Qoyunlu Turkmen dynasties, written in Persian. The book is considered the most important primary source on the history of these two dynasties. The author of the book is Abu Bakr Tehrani (ابوبکر طهرانی). The book was written between 875/1469 and 883/1478.

== Author ==
Abu Bakr Tehrani was a historian and official in the court of the Aq Qoyunlu and Qara Qoyunlu dynasties. The only information we have about him comes from his own autobiography in the book. He introduced himself as Abu Bakr al-Tehrani al-Esfahani (ابوبکر الطهرانی الاصفهانی).

== Importance ==
Ketāb-e Dīārbakrīya is the only independent primary source about the Aq Qoyunlu and Qara Qoyunlu Turkmen dynasties. Muhammad Khwandamir was aware of the existence of this book, though he did not use it in his works. According to Faruk Sümer, the unique manuscript of this book contains information about the year 876 AH and is incomplete.

== Sources ==
- Langaroodi, Reza Rezazadeh; Cooper, John (2015). "Abū Bakr Ṭihrānī". In Madelung, Wilferd; Daftary, Farhad (eds.). Encyclopaedia Islamica Online. Brill Online. ISSN 1875-9831.
- Faruk Sümer (1988–2016). "Kitâb-ı Diyarbekriyye". TDV Encyclopedia of Islam (44+2 vols.) (in Turkish). Istanbul: Turkiye Diyanet Foundation, Centre for Islamic Studies.
