= Doublure (bookbinding) =

Ornamental linings on the inside of a book

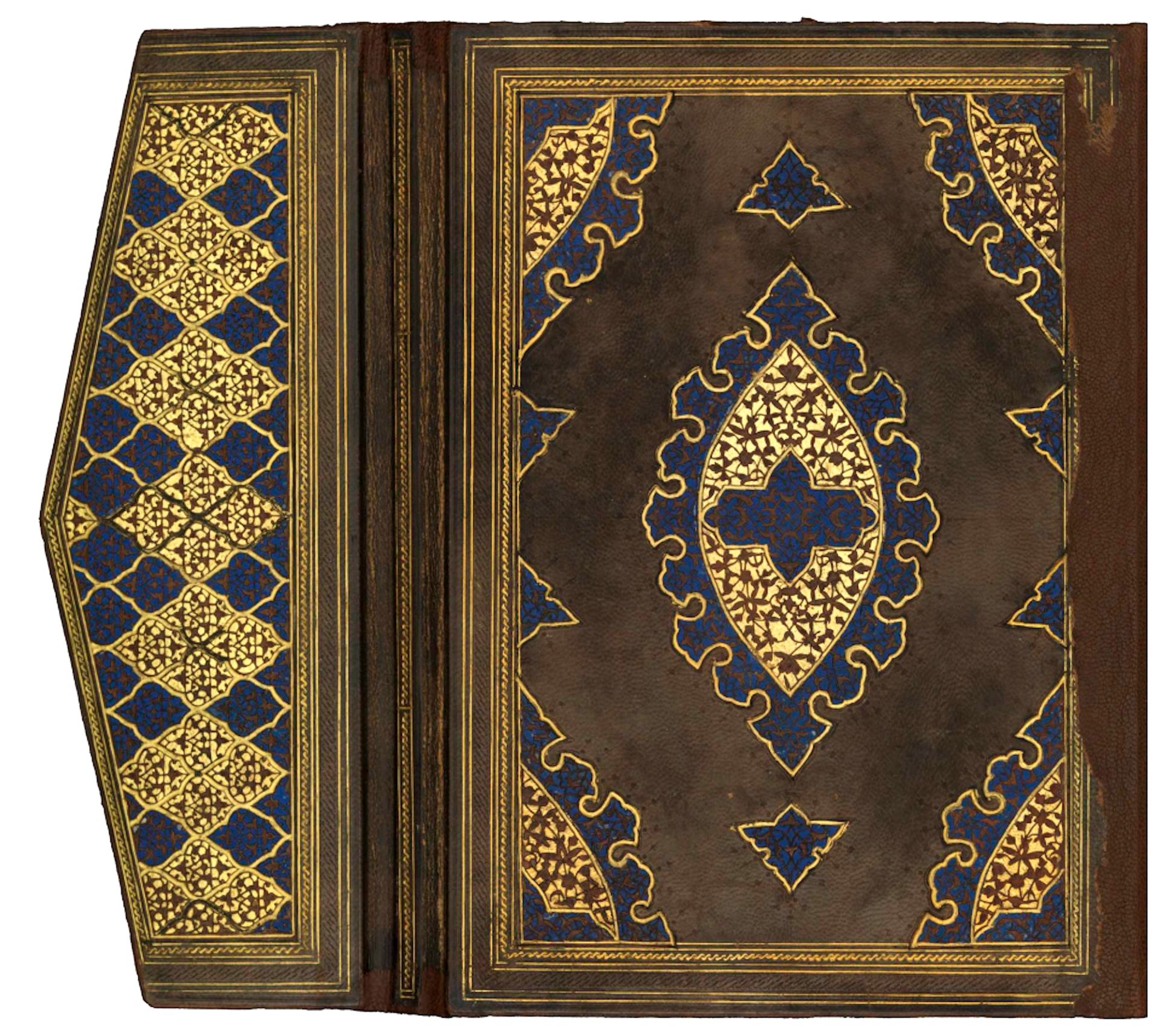
Back doublure of the "Divan of Hidayat"", a famous 15th-century manuscript, now in Dublin.

Doublures are ornamental linings on the inside of a book. Doublures are protected from wear, compared to the outside of a book, and thus offer bookbinders scope for elaborate decoration.

The 15th-century Islamic doublures strongly influenced the doublures in Western Europe.

The term doublure is of French origin. Tooled doublures are found in French bookbinding of the seventeenth century: in particular, they are associated with the books of the Jansenist sect, which were extremely simple on the outside, while they had gilding on the doublure. One of the bookbinders known for his Jansenist-style bindings was Luc-Antoine Boyet, binder to Louis XIV. The term Jansenist is also applied to bindings in this style of a much later date.

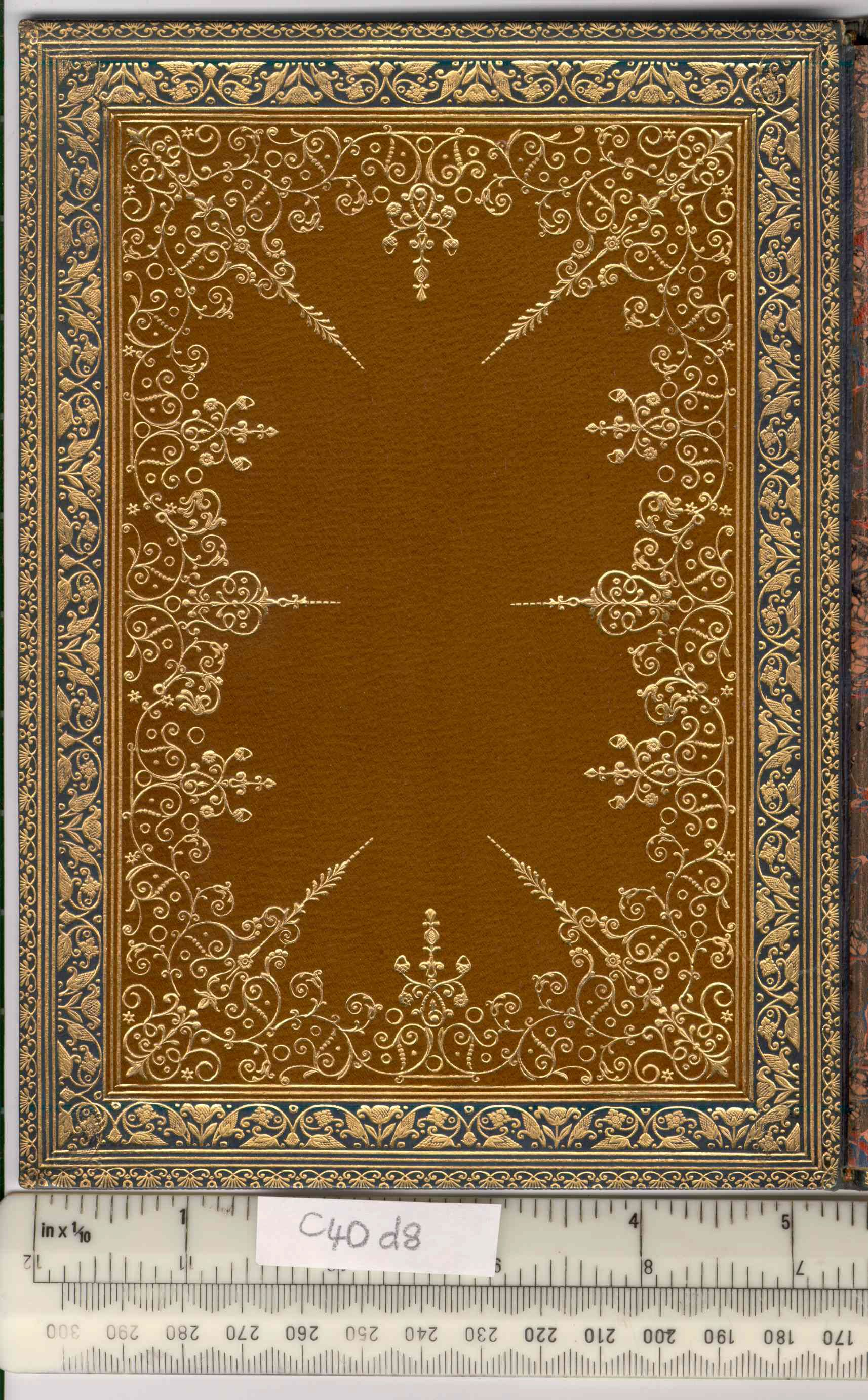
Doublure by Charles Tuckett, a binder employed by the British Museum.

The British bookbinder G.T. Bagguley patented a process for tooling in colours called the "Sutherland binding" which was principally employed on doublures. As well as running his bindery in Newcastle-under-Lyme, around the end of the 19th century Bagguley held the post of librarian at Trentham Hall, the home of Duke and Duchess of Sutherland. He named the process after the duchess, but the books so decorated included items which were intended for other patrons. They were often in art nouveau style.
