= Baba Fighani Shirazi =

Persian poet (died 1519)

- Born: 15th-century Shiraz, Aq Qoyunlu
- Died: 1519; Mashhad, Safavid Iran
- Occupation: Poet

Baba Fighani Sherazi (or Shirazi, also spelled Faghani and Fughani; died 1519) was a Persian poet active in the late 15th and early 16th centuries. Born and raised in the southern city of Shiraz, Fighani belonged to a family of craftsmen, working as a cutler for his father and brother during his youth. It is unknown how Fighani rose to prominence as a poet, but by the time the Aq Qoyunlu Ya'qub Beg (r. 1478–1490) ruled, he had become a notable figure, and was thus was given the honorific title of bābā šāʿir or bābā al-šuʿarā (lit. "papa poet") by the latter.

Fighani served as a court poet of Ya'qub Beg alongside other distinguished figures such as Ahli Shirazi, Kamal al-Din Bana'i Haravi, and Shahidi Qumi. Fighani also established a reputation as someone who could not drink much alcohol without getting quickly drunk, despite his fondness and frequent visits to local taverns. During the disintegration of the Aq Qoyunlu realm, Fighani left for the east, where he settled in Abivard, and then finally Mashhad. There he dedicated many of his poems to the Shi'i Imams and the rising Safavid ruler, Shah Ismail I (r. 1501–1524). Fighani died in 1519 in Mashhad, where he was buried.

By the early 17th-century, Fighani became regarded as the founder of the "Fresh Style" (ṭarz-i tāza) of Persian poetry, later known as sabk-i Hindī (lit. "Indian style"), which was the leading style for over two centuries. However, Iranologist Homa Katouzian considers attribution to be an "exaggeration", stating that the movement was an "evolutionary one." Fighani's work had a permanent impact on the design of Persian poetry under the Safavids.

== Sources ==
- Katouzian, Homa (2013). "A note on form and substance in classical Persian poetry". In Hillenbrand, Robert; Peacock, A. C. S.; Abdullaeva, Firuza (eds.). Ferdowsi, the Mongols and the History of Iran: Art, Literature and Culture from Early Islam to Qajar Persia. I.B. Tauris. ISBN 978-1780760155.
- Lingwood, Chad (2013). Politics, Poetry, and Sufism in Medieval Iran: New Perspectives on Jāmī's Salāmān va Absāl. Brill. ISBN 978-9004254046.
- Losensky, Paul E. (2020). "Fighānī Shīrāzī, Bābā". In Fleet, Kate; Krämer, Gudrun; Matringe, Denis; Nawas, John; Rowson, Everett (eds.). Encyclopaedia of Islam (3rd ed.). Brill Online. ISSN 1873-9830.
- Safa, Z. (1988). "Bābā Faḡānī". In Yarshater, Ehsan (ed.). Encyclopædia Iranica. Vol. III/3: Azerbaijan IV–Bačča(-ye) Saqqā. London and New York: Routledge & Kegan Paul. p. 291. ISBN 978-0-71009-115-4.
