= Abu Bakr Tihrani =

Secretary and court historian (died after 1481)

- Born: Tihran, Isfahan
- Died: after 1481
- Occupations: Secretary and court historian
- Years active: c. 1447–1481
- Notable work: Kitab-i Diyarbakriyya

Abu Bakr Tihrani (Persian: ابوبکر طهرانی; died after 1481) was an Iranian secretary, who served under the Timurid, Qara Qoyunlu, and Aq Qoyunlu dynasties in the 15th century. Initially serving in the provincial divan of the Timurid ruler Shah Rukh (r. 1405–1447), Tihrani shifted his allegiance to the rising Qara Qoyunlu leader Jahan Shah (r. 1438–1467), whom he accompanied in his campaigns. However, with the downfall of the Qara Qoyunlu and the rise of the Aq Qoyunlu leader Uzun Hasan (r. 1453–1478), Tihrani eventually joined the latter in April 1469, becoming one of his close companions. He played an influential role in the correspondence of the Aq Qoyunlu, and also became their court historian, composing the Kitab-i Diyarbakriyya in 1473/4, the main account of the Qara Qoyunlu and Aq Qoyunlu. The last mention of Tihrani is in 1481; he probably died not longer after.

== Background ==
What is little known of his life can only be found in his book, the Kitab-i Diyarbakriyya. In its introduction, he calls himself "Abu Bakr al-Tihrani al-Isfahani", which implies that he was a native of Tihran, a village adjacent to Isfahan. According to Yaqut al-Hamawi (d. 1229), Tihran was a common place for producing traditionists.

== Career ==
Tihrani first appears during the late reign of the Timurid ruler Shah Rukh (r. 1405–1447), under whom he served in the provincial divan. He was in Shah Rukh's camp at Ray at the time of the latter's death in 1447. Tihrani was later in Isfahan at the time of Sultan Muhammad's murder at the instigation of his brother Babur Mirza. The city was soon captured by the Qara Qoyunlu leader Jahan Shah (r. 1438–1467), who appointed his son Muhammadi Mirza as its governor. Tihrani soon entered into his service, and was appointed an administrator.

He was later part of the retinue of Muhammadi Mirza and Jahan Shah during their expeditions to Damghan and Khurasan in 1457–1458. He wrote down the terms of the peace treaty between Jahan Shah and the Timurid ruler Abu Sa'id Mirza (r. 1451–1469), which was signed by the end of the very year. It is unclear if Tihrani also accompanied Jahan Shah during his battle against the Aq Qoyunlu leader Uzun Hasan (r. 1453–1478) in 1466/7, which resulted in the defeat of the former. It is, however, certain that Tihrani resided in Qazvin during the war between Uzun Hasan and Abu Sa'id Mirza, albeit the reason behind it is obscure.

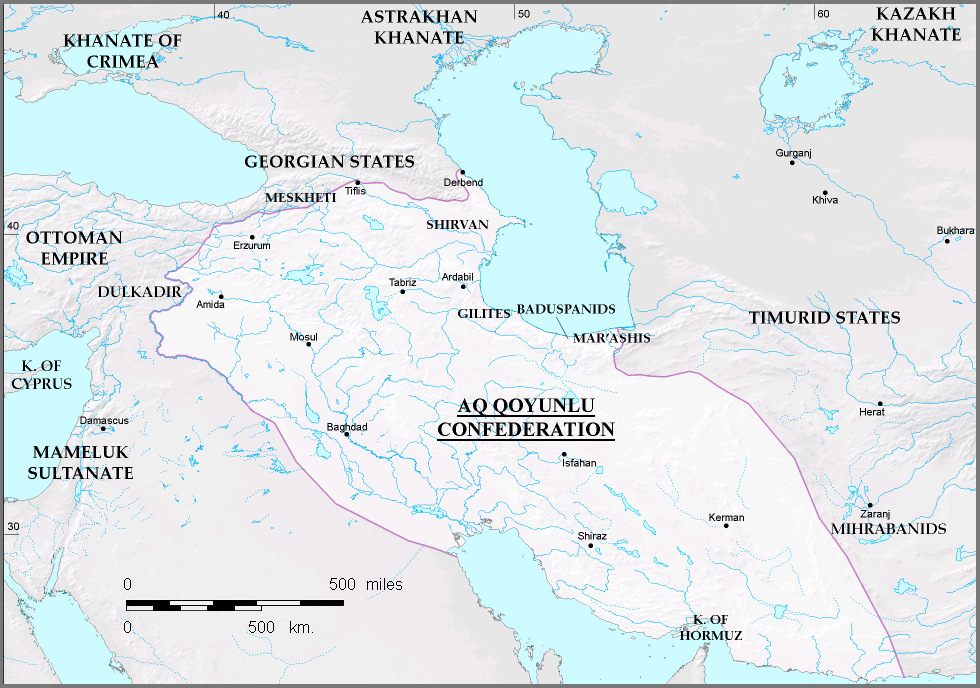
Map of the Aq Qoyunlu realm under Uzun Hasan (r. 1453–1478) in 1478

During his stay in Qazvin, Tihrani encountered Mawlana Shams al-Din, an emissary of Sayyidi Ali Beg, governor of Shiraz, who was en route to Ardabil to submit to Abu Sa'id Mirza. However, Tihrani talked out of him of it; he believed that Abu Sa'id Mirza would eventually be defeated by the Aq Qoyunlu. It turned out to be correct; Abu Sa'id Mirza was soon defeated and killed by the Aq Qoyunlu. Tihrani was subsequently summoned by Uzun Hasan to his court at Ardabil, and entered into his service in April 1469, becoming one of his close companions. This invitation shows that Uzun Hasan admired such distinguished figures.

It was not restricted to Tihrani, other figures that joined the Aq Qoyunlu, including Qazi Isa Savaji and Amir Zahir al-Din Ibrahim Shah, who together with Tihrani were the closest to the court and frequently transmitted the issues and needs of the people. Tihrani played a vital role in shaping Uzun Hasan's royal image through diplomatic correspondence. Using his previous experience as an official of the Timurids, he incorporated their royal ideology into that of the Aq Qoyunlu. Some of his writings are cited in various sources, including a document by Uzun Hasan in Husayn Harawi's Jami al-insha, which reports the appointment of Yadgar Muhammad Mirza to the governorship of Khurasan. The author of the document was Tihrani, albeit he does not mention it. Tihrani also wrote the Arabic letter that Uzun Hasan sent to Qaitbay, the Mamluk ruler of Egypt, and another in Persian to the Qaramanid ruler Pir Ahmad Qaramani. As a result of his secretarial prowess, his reputation expanded as far as India and beyond, even resulting in an invitation to Deccan by Sadr Jahan, which he turned down.

Like the date of his birth, Tihrani's date of death is uncertain. His seal is marked in a scroll from 1481; he most likely died not long after.

== Works ==
Tihrani is notable for composing the Kitab-i Diyarbakriyya, the only historical chronicle that reports the history of the Turkoman dynasties of the Qara Qoyunlu and Aq Qoyunlu in detail.

== Sources ==
- Langaroodi, Reza Rezazadeh; Cooper, John (2015). "Abū Bakr Ṭihrānī". In Madelung, Wilferd; Daftary, Farhad (eds.). Encyclopaedia Islamica Online. Brill Online. ISSN 1875-9831.
- Manz, Beatrice Forbes (2007). Power, Politics and Religion in Timurid Iran. Cambridge University Press. ISBN 978-1-139-46284-6.
- Markiewicz, Christopher (2019). The Crisis of Kingship in Late Medieval Islam. Cambridge University Press. ISBN 978-1108492140.
