= Aq Qoyunlu =

Persianate, Sunni-Muslim Turkoman confederation (1378–1508)

Aq Qoyunlu آق قویونلو
- 1378–1508
- A sanjak (flag) belonging to Uzun Hasan Tamga of Bayandur used by the Aq Qoyunlu

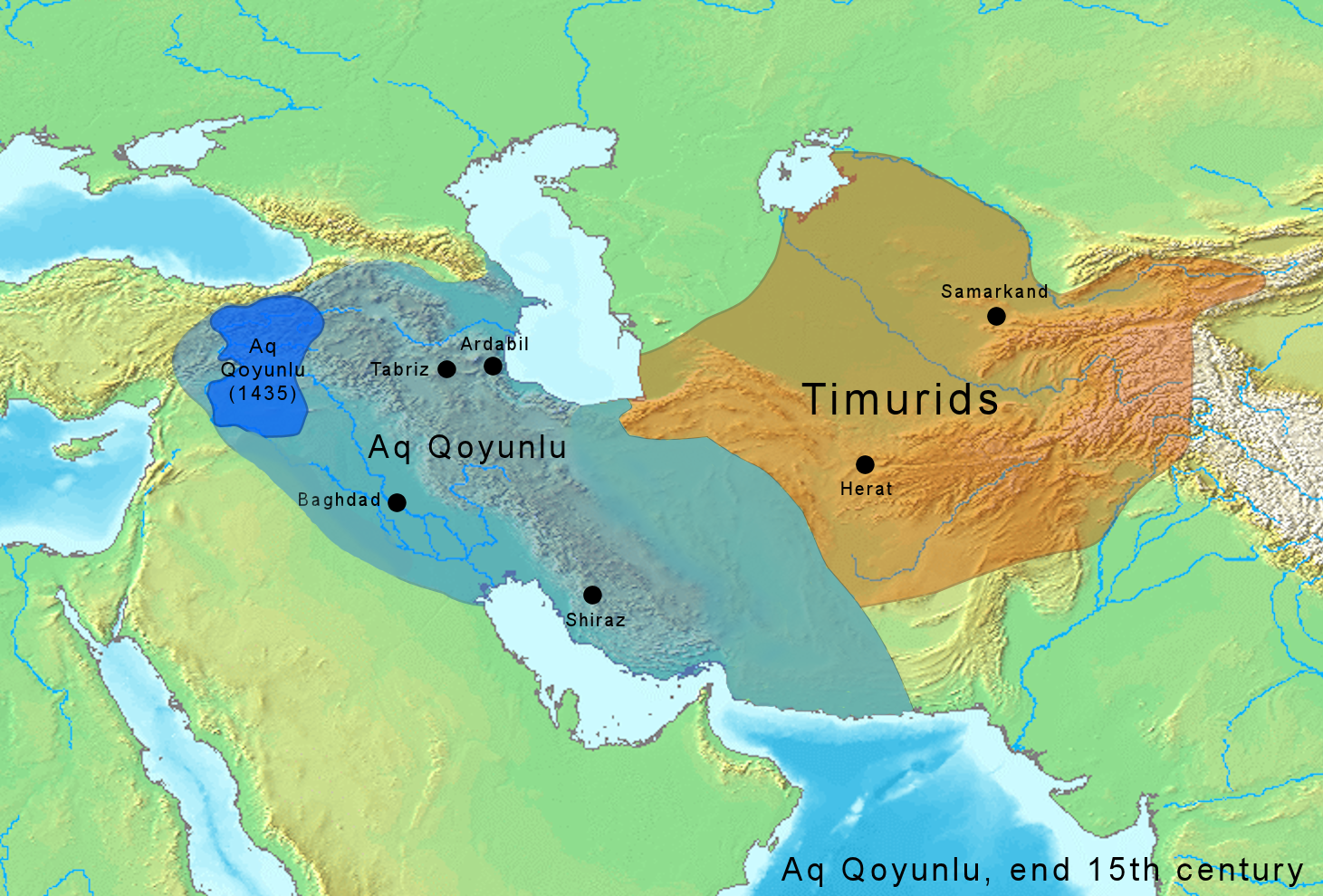
- Original territory of the Aq Qoyunlu in 1435 , and maximum extent at end of the 15th century , next to the Timurids .
- Status: Confederate sultanate
- Capital: Bayburt (summer pastures); Kiğı, Palu, and Ergani (winter pastures); Âmid (1403 April–1468); Tabriz (1468–January 6, 1478)
- Common languages: Persian (official court language, poetry) (Note: ...Persian was primarily the language of poetry in the Aq Qoyunlu court.); Azerbaijani Turkic (dynastic, army, poetry)
- Religion: Sunni Islam
- Government: Monarchy
- Ruler
  - 1378–1435: Qara Yuluk Uthman Beg
  - 1497–1508: Sultan Murad
- Legislature: Kengač (legislative); Boy ḵānları (military)
- Historical era: Medieval
  - First raid on the Trapezuntine Empire by Tur Ali Beg: 1340
  - Siege of Trebizond: 1348
  - Established: 1378
  - Coup by Uzun Hasan: Autumn 1452
  - Reunification: 1457
  - Death of Ahmad Beg, division of the Aq Qoyunlu: December, 1497
  - Collapse of the Aq Qoyunlu rule in Iran: Summer 1503
  - End of the Aq Qoyunlu rule in Mesopotamia: 1508
- Currency: Akçe; Ashrafi; Dinar; Tanka Hasanbegî (equal to 2 akçe)
Preceded by	Succeeded by
Qara Qoyunlu	Safavid Empire; Ottoman Empire

The Aq Qoyunlu or the White Sheep Turkomans (Note: • Also referred to as the Aq Qoyunlu confederacy, the Aq Qoyunlu sultanate, the Aq Qoyunlu empire, the White Sheep confederacy. • Other spellings includes Ag Qoyunlu, Agh Qoyunlu, Ak Koyunlu or Aq Quyunlu. • Also mentioned as Bayanduriyye (Bayandurids) in Iranian and Ottoman sources. • Also known as Tur-'Alids in Mamluk sources.) (Azerbaijani: Ağqoyunlular, آغ‌قویونلولار; Persian: آق‌ قویونلو) was a Turkoman, culturally Persianate, Sunni Muslim tribal confederation. Founded in the Diyarbakir region by Qara Yuluk Uthman Beg, they ruled parts of present-day eastern Turkey from 1378 to 1508, and in their last decades also ruled Armenia, Azerbaijan, much of Iran, Iraq, and Oman where the ruler of Hormuz recognised Aq Qoyunlu suzerainty. The Aq Qoyunlu empire reached its zenith under Uzun Hasan. The ruling family was from the Bayandur clan of the Oghuz Turks.

== History ==
=== Etymology ===
The name Aq Qoyunlu, literally meaning "those with white sheep", is first mentioned in late 14th century sources. They were likely so named because of the white sheep that was painted on their flags. It has been suggested that this name refers to old totemic symbols, but according to Rashid al-Din Hamadani, the Turks were forbidden to eat the flesh of their totem-animals, and so this is unlikely given the importance of mutton in the diet of pastoral nomads. Another hypothesis is that the name refers to the predominant color of their flocks.

=== Origins ===
According to chronicles from the Byzantine Empire, the Aq Qoyunlu are first attested in the district of Bayburt south of the Pontic Mountains from at least the 1340s. In these chronicles, Tur Ali Beg was mentioned as lord of the "Turks of Amid", who had already attained the rank of amir under the Ilkhan Ghazan. Under his leadership, they besieged Trebizond, but failed to take the town. A number of their leaders, including the dynasty's founder, Qara Yuluk Uthman Beg, married Byzantine princesses.

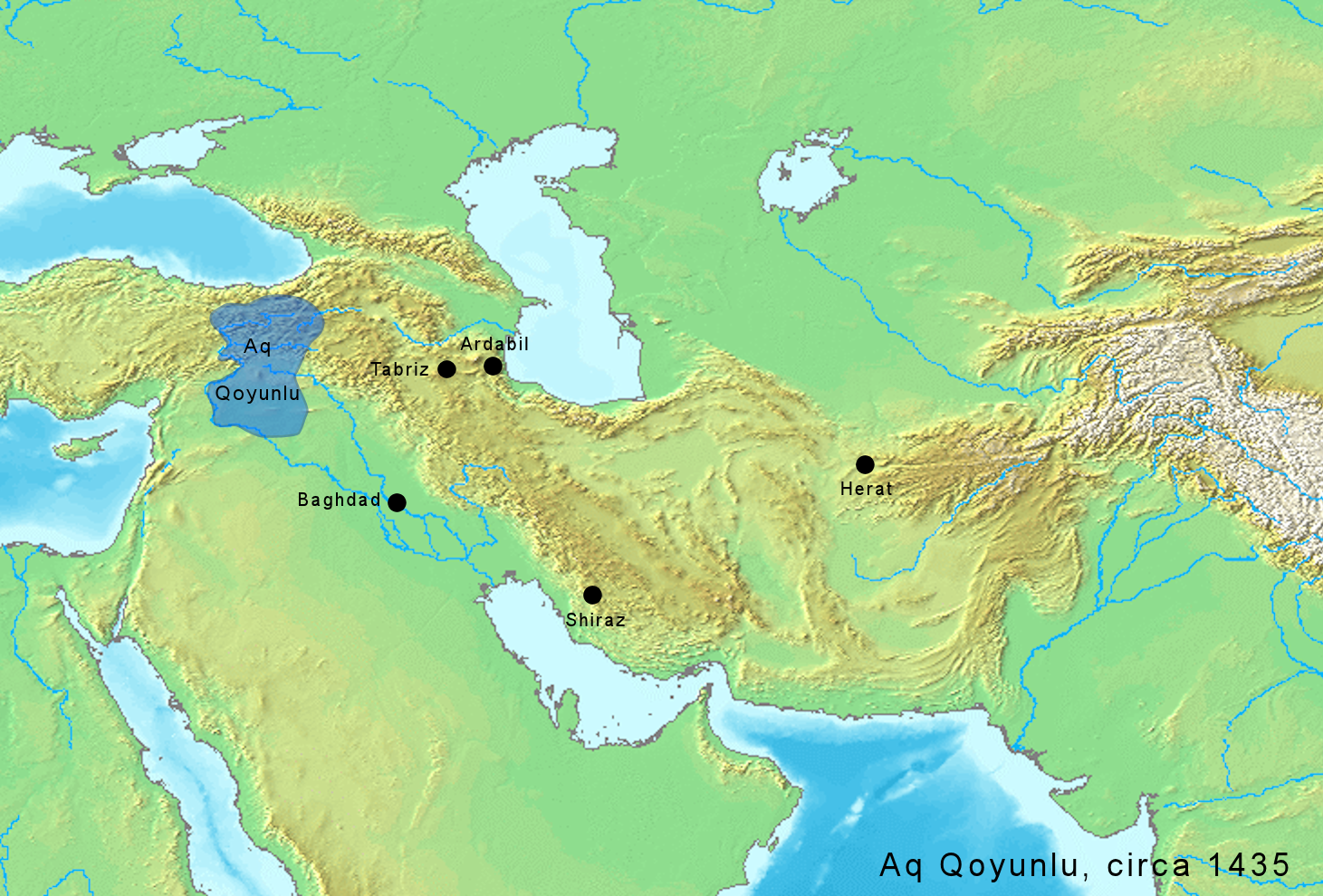
Aq Qoyunlu domains, circa 1435

By the end of the Ilkhanid period in the mid-14th century, the Oghuz tribes that comprised the Aq Qoyunlu confederation roamed the summer pastures in Armenia, in particular, the upper reaches of the Tigris river and winter pastures between the towns of Diyarbakır and Sivas. Since the end of the 14th century, Aq Qoyunlu waged constant wars with another tribal confederation of the Oghuz tribes, the Qara Qoyunlu. The leading Aq Qoyunlu tribe was the Bayandur tribe.

Uzun Hasan used to assert the claim that he was an "honorable descendant of Oghuz Khan and his grandson, Bayandur Khan". In a letter dating to the year 1470, which was sent to Şehzade Bayezid, the then-governor of Amasya, Uzun Hasan wrote that those from the Bayandur and Bayat tribes, as well as other tribes that belonged to the "Oghuz il", and formerly inhabited Mangyshlak, Khwarazm and Turkestan, came and served in his court. He also made the tamga (seal) of the Bayandur tribe the symbol of his state. For this reason, the Bayandur tamga is found in Aq Qoyunlu coins, their official documents, inscriptions and flags.

Myth

The Aq Qoyunlu Sultans claimed descent from Bayindir Khan, who was a grandson of Oghuz Khan, the legendary ancestor of Oghuz Turks.

According to Professor G. L. Lewis:

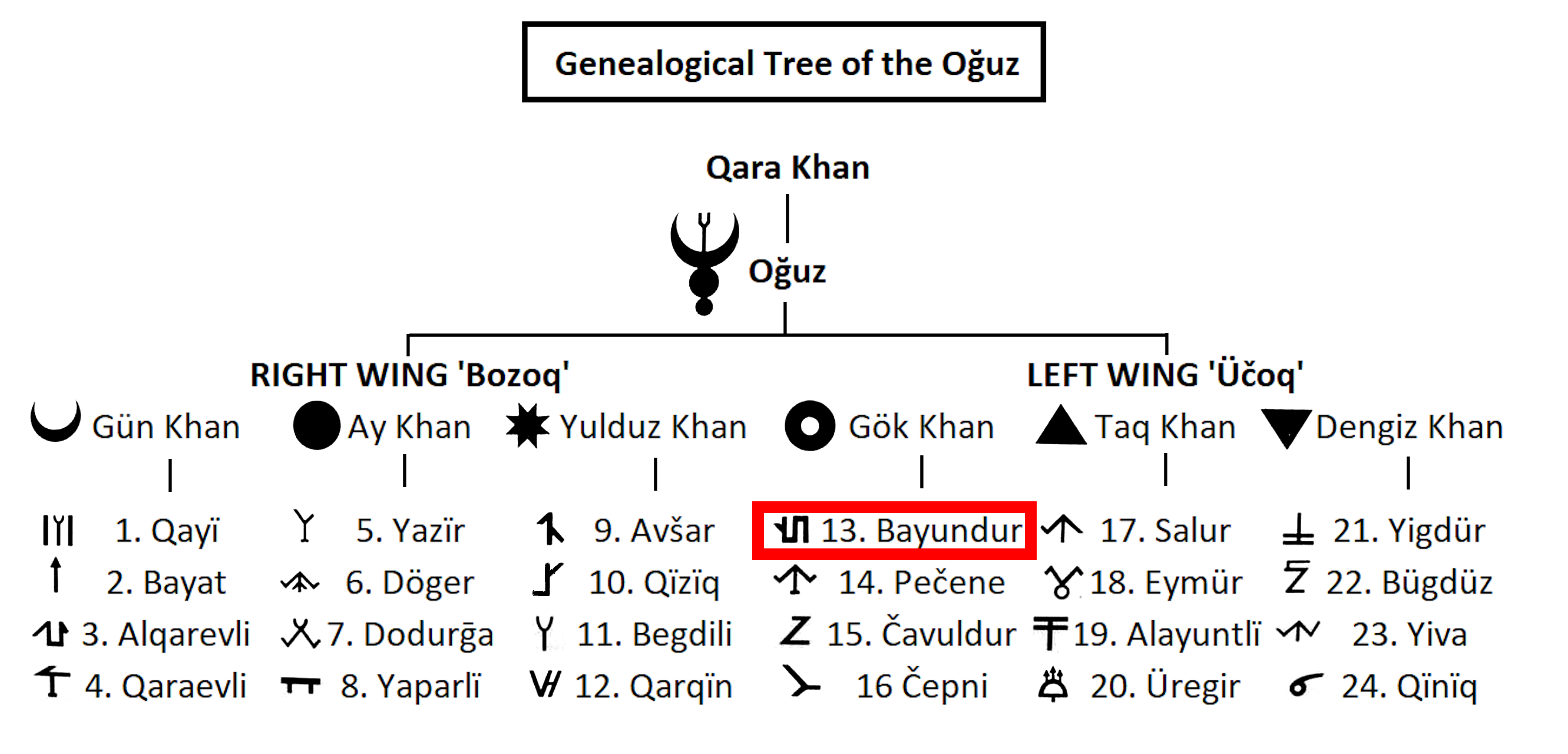
Bayindir in the Oghuz genealogical tree

The Ak-koyunlu Sultans claimed descent from Bayindir Khan and it is likely, on the face of it, that the Book of Dede Korkut was composed under their patronage. The snag about this is that in the Ak-koyunlu genealogy Bayindir's father is named as Gok ('Sky') Khan, son of the eponymous Oghuz Khan, whereas in our book he is named as Kam Ghan, a name otherwise unknown. In default of any better explanation, I therefore incline to the belief that the book was composed before Ak-koyunlu rulers had decided who their ancestors were. It was in 1403 that they ceased to be tribal chiefs and became Sultans, so we may assume that their official genealogy was formulated round about that date.

According to the Kitab-i Diyarbakriyya, the ancestors of Uzun Hasan back to the prophet Adam in the 68th generation are listed by name and information is given about them. Among them is Tur Ali Bey, the grandfather of Uzun Hasan's grandfather, who is also mentioned in other sources. But it is difficult to say whether Pehlivan Bey, Ezdi Bey and Idris Bey, who are listed in earlier periods, really existed. Most of the people who are listed as the ancestors of Uzun Hasan are names related to the Oghuz legend and to Oghuz rulers.

=== Uzun Hasan (ruled 1452–1478) ===
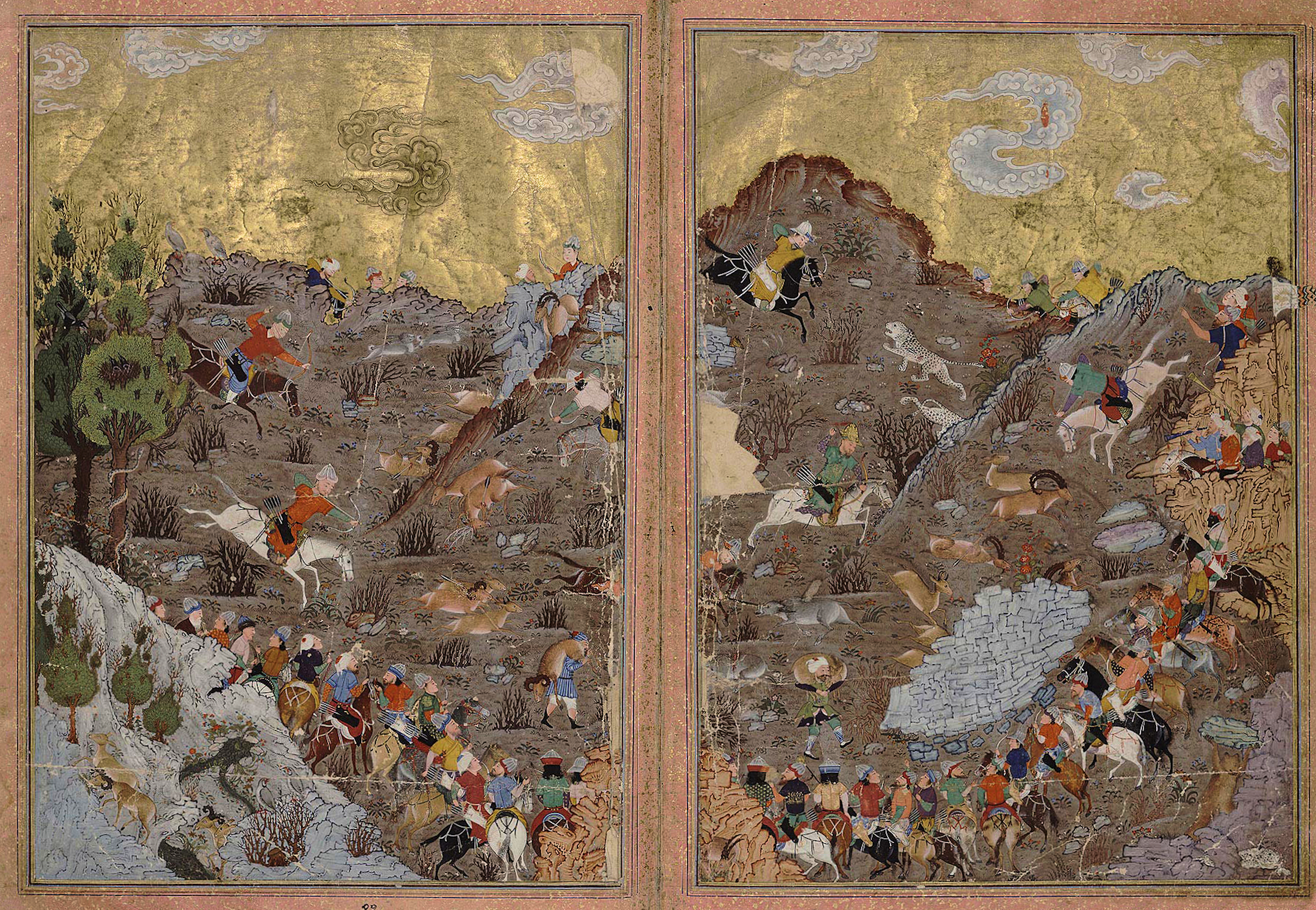
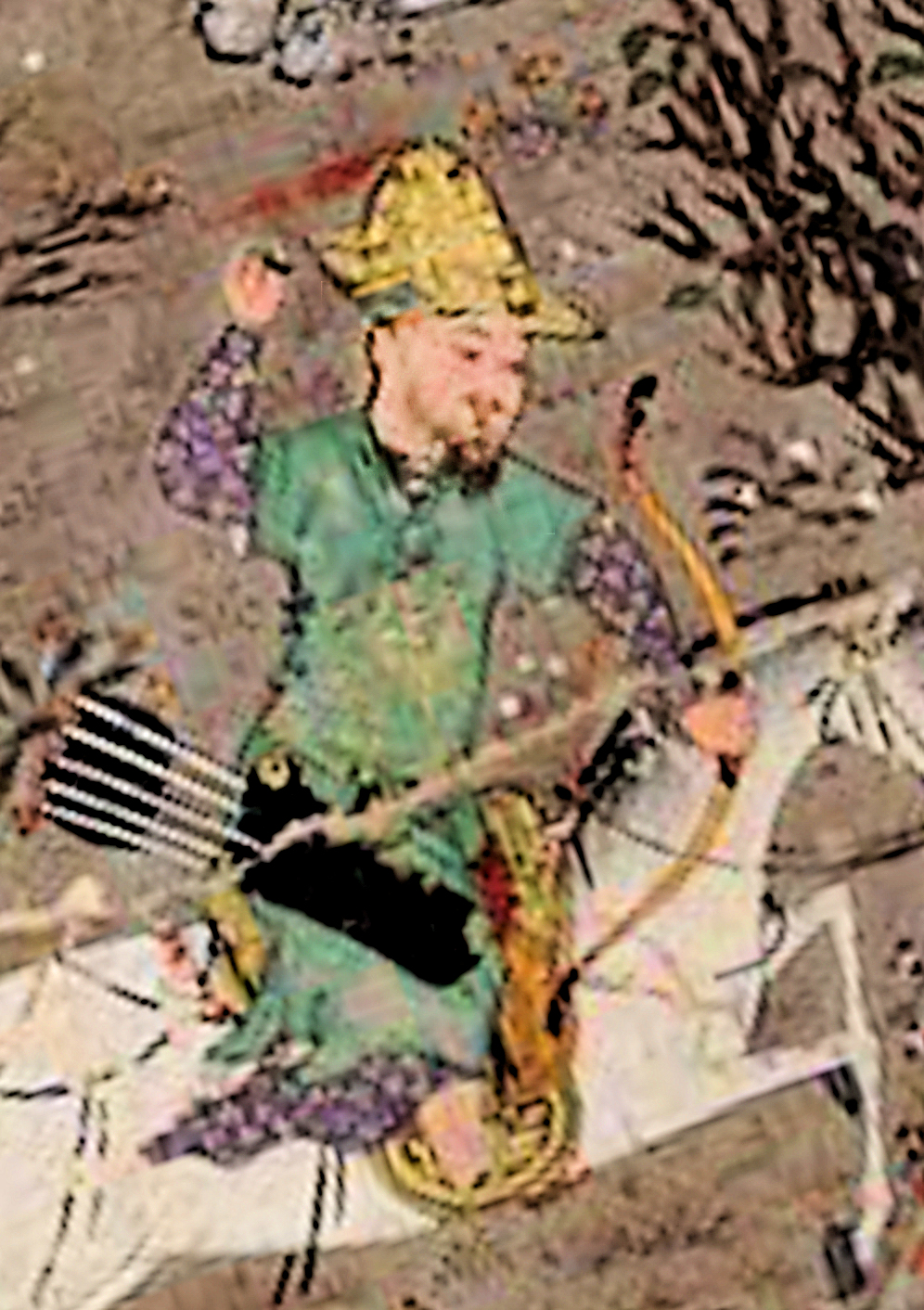
Hunting scene, including likely contemporary portrait of Uzun Hasan hunting on horse, 1460s–1470s. Saint Peterburg, Russian National Library, Dorn 434.

The Aq Qoyunlu Turkomans first acquired land in 1402, when Timur granted them all of Diyar Bakr in present-day Turkey. For a long time, the Aq Qoyunlu were unable to expand their territory, as the rival Qara Qoyunlu or "Black Sheep Turkomans" kept them at bay. However, this changed with the rule of Uzun Hasan, who defeated the Black Sheep Turkoman leader Jahān Shāh in 1467 at the Battle of Chapakchur.

After the death of Jahan Shah, his son Hasan Ali, with the help of the Timurid ruler Abu Sa'id Mirza, marched on Azerbaijan to meet Uzun Hasan. Deciding to spend the winter in Karabakh, Abu Sa'id was defeated by the Aq Qoyunlu at the Battle of Qarabagh in 1469. Uzun Hasan supported a new Timurid ruler in Yadgar Muhammad Mirza, and gave him military assistance in occupying Khorasan, and temporarily capture Herat in July 1470 from Sultan Husayn Bayqara.

Uzun Hasan was also able to take Baghdad along with territories around the Persian Gulf. However, around this time, the Ottoman Empire sought to expand eastwards, a serious threat that forced the Aq Qoyunlu into an alliance with the Karamanids of central Anatolia.

As early as 1464, Uzun Hasan had requested military aid from one of the Ottoman Empire's strongest enemies, Venice. Despite Venetian promises, and the visit of Venetian ambassadors at the court of Uzun Hasan, this aid never arrived and, as a result, Uzun Hasan was defeated by the Ottomans at the Battle of Otlukbeli in 1473, though this did not destroy the Aq Qoyunlu.

In 1469, Uzun Hasan sent the head of the Timurid Sultan, Sultan Abu Sa'id, with an embassy to the court of the newly ascended al-Ashraf Qaitbay in Cairo. With these presents came a fathnama, in Persian, explaining to the Mamluk sultan the events leading up to the Aq Quyunlu—Timurid conflict approximately five months earlier, emphasizing in particular Sultan-Abu Sa'id's plans of aggression toward the Mamluk and Aq Quyunlu dominions—plans that were thwarted by Qaitbay's loyal peer Uzun Hasan. Despite the negative response from Qaitbay, Uzun Hasan's continued correspondence to the Mamluk Sultanate were in Persian.

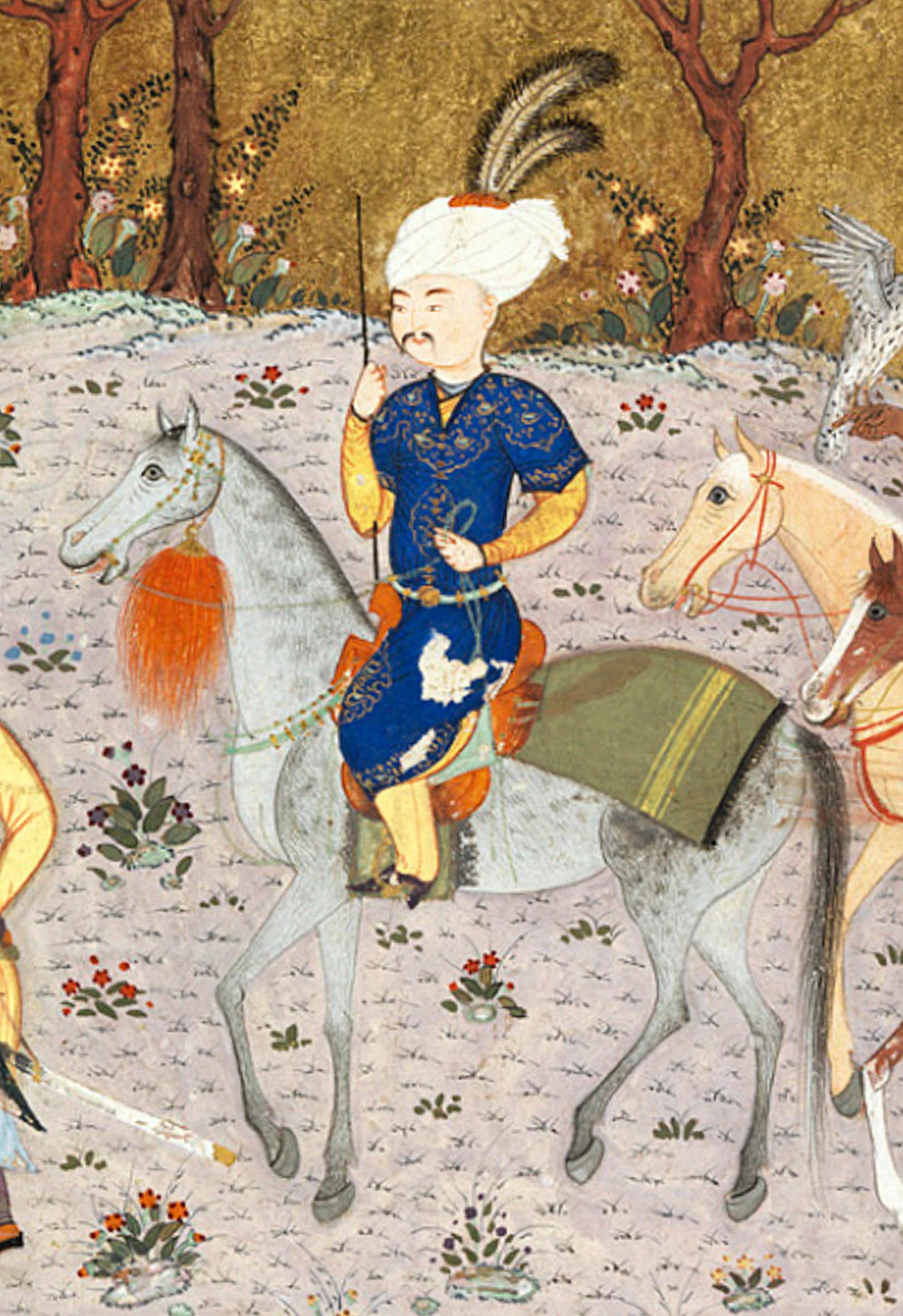
Contemporary depiction of Sultan Khalil, in a miniature from the manuscript of Divan of Hidayat (1478). Chester Beatty Library (MS 401).

In 1470, Uzun selected Abu Bakr Tihrani to compile a history of the Aq Qoyunlu confederation. The Kitab-i Diyarbakriyya, written in Persian, referred to Uzun Hasan as sahib-qiran and was the first historical work to assign this title to a non-Timurid ruler.

Uzun Hasan preserved relationships with the members of the popular dervish order whose main inclinations were towards Shi'ism, while promoting the urban religious establishment with donations and confirmations of tax concessions or endowments, and ordering the pursuit of extremist Shiite and antinomist sects. He married his daughter Alamshah Halime Begum to his nephew Haydar, the new head of the Safavid sect in Ardabil.

=== Sultan Khalil (ruled 1478) ===
When Uzun Hasan died early in 1478, he was succeeded by his son Khalil Mirza for a few months, but the latter was defeated by a confederation under his younger brother Ya'qub at the battle of Khoy in July.

Khalil appears in an exquisite illustrated manuscript of the Diwān of Hidayat, written in Azarbayjani Turkish. The manuscript contains several depictions of Khalil during various activities, such as holding court in a garden, giving audience from his palace balcony, on a hawking expedition, and relaxing in a vinery. It displays typical Turkman figures with small rounded faces.

=== Sultan Ya'qub (ruled 1478-1490) ===
Ya'qub, who reigned from 1478 to 1490, sustained the dynasty for a while longer. However, during the first four years of his reign there were seven pretenders to the throne who had to be put down. Unlike his father, Ya'qub Beg was not interested in popular religious rites and alienated a large part of the people, especially the Turks. Therefore, the vast majority of Turks became involved in the Safawiya order, which became a militant organization with an extreme Shiite ideology led by Sheikh Haydar.

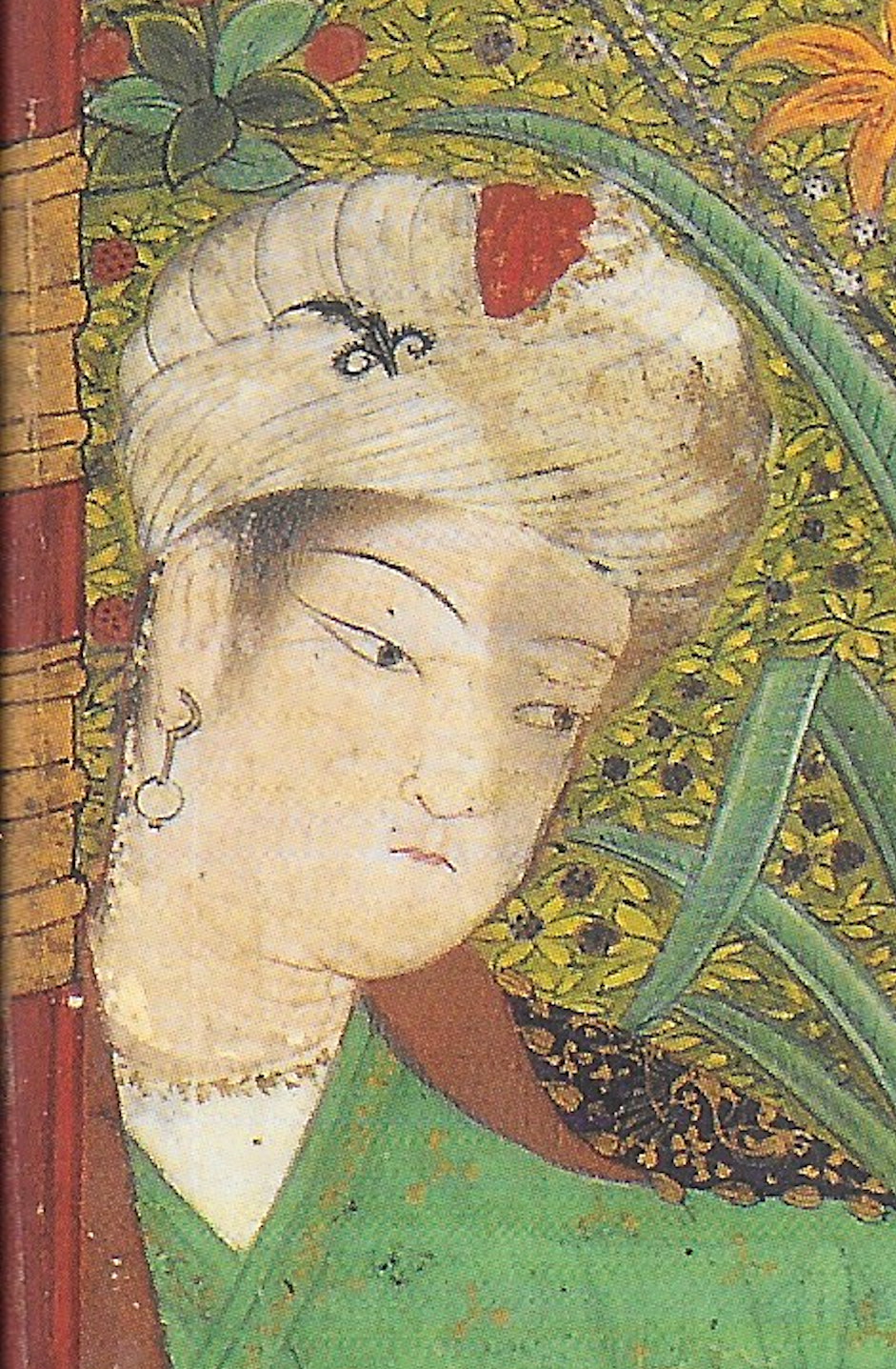
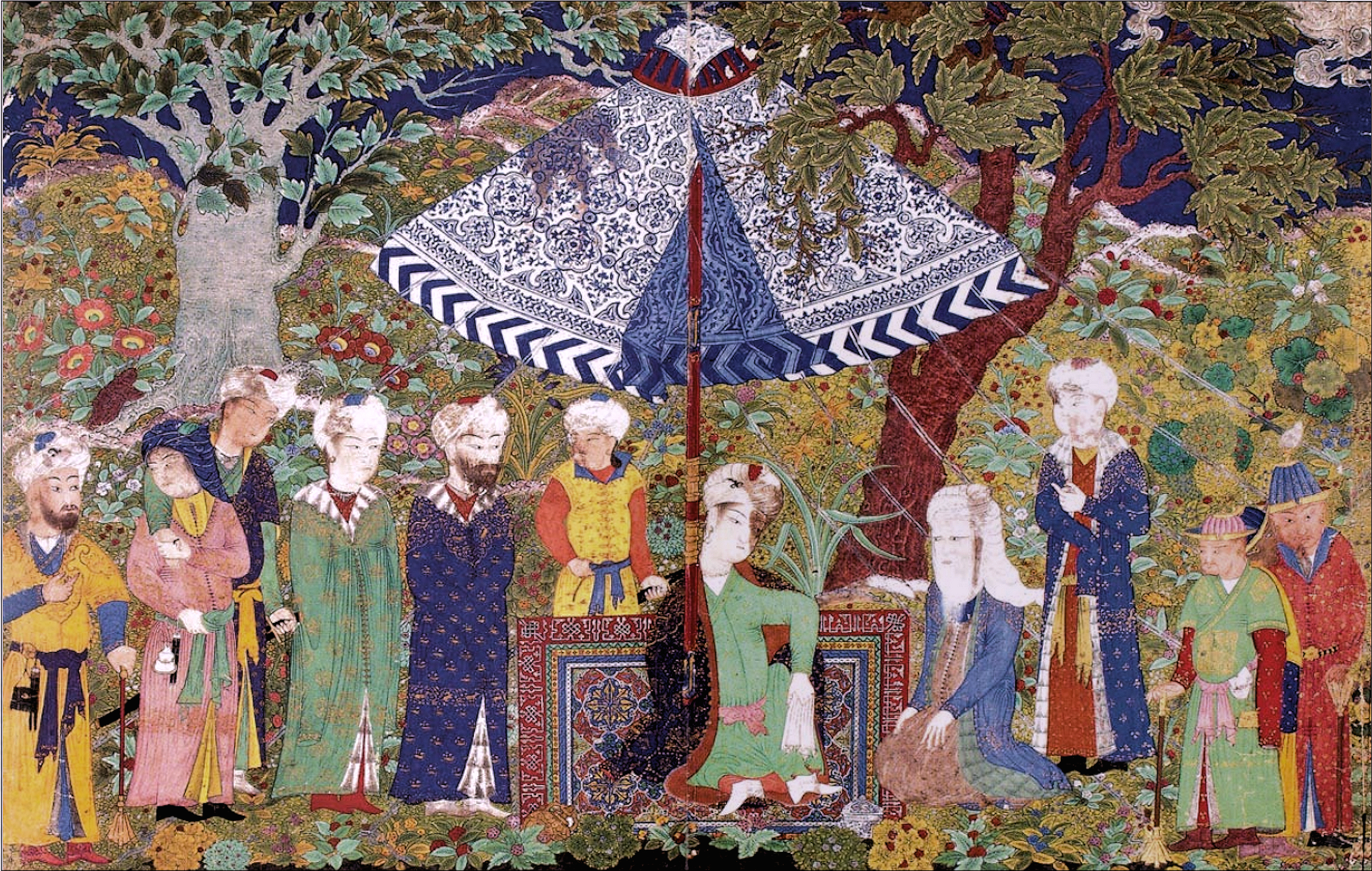
Contemporary portrait of Sultan Ya'qub (detail) with his court, painted in 1478-90 in Tabriz. Topkapı Sarayı Library (H. 2153).

Ya'qub initially sent Sheikh Haydar and his followers to a holy war against the Circassians, but soon decided to break the alliance because he feared the military power of Sheikh Haydar and his order. During his march to Georgia, Sheikh Haydar attacked one of Ya'qub's vassals, the Shirvanshahs, in revenge for his father, Sheikh Junayd (assassinated in 1460), and Ya'qub sent troops to the Shirvanshahs, who defeated and killed Haydar and captured his three sons. This event further strengthened the pro-Safavid feeling among Azerbaijani and Anatolian Turkmen.

Following Ya'qub's death, civil war again erupted, the Aq Qoyunlus destroyed themselves from within, and they ceased to be a threat to their neighbors. The early Safavids, who were followers of the Safaviyya religious order, began to undermine the allegiance of the Aq Qoyunlu. The Safavids and the Aq Qoyunlu met in battle in the city of Nakhchivan in 1501 and the Safavid leader Ismail I forced the Aq Qoyunlu to withdraw.

In his retreat from the Safavids, the Aq Qoyunlu leader Alwand destroyed an autonomous state of the Aq Qoyunlu in Mardin. The last Aq Qoyunlu leader, Sultan Murad, brother of Alwand, was also defeated by the same Safavid leader. Though Murād briefly established himself in Baghdad in 1501, he soon withdrew back to Diyar Bakr, signaling the end of the Aq Qoyunlu rule.

=== Ahmad Beg (ruled 1497) ===
Amidst the struggle for power between Uzun Hasan's grandsons Baysungur (son of Yaqub) and Rustam (son of Maqsud), their cousin Ahmed Bey appeared on the stage. Ahmed Bey was the son of Uzun Hasan's eldest son Ughurlu Muhammad, who, in 1475, escaped to the Ottoman Empire, where the sultan, Mehmed the Conqueror, received Uğurlu Muhammad with kindness and gave him his daughter in marriage, of whom Ahmed Bey was born.

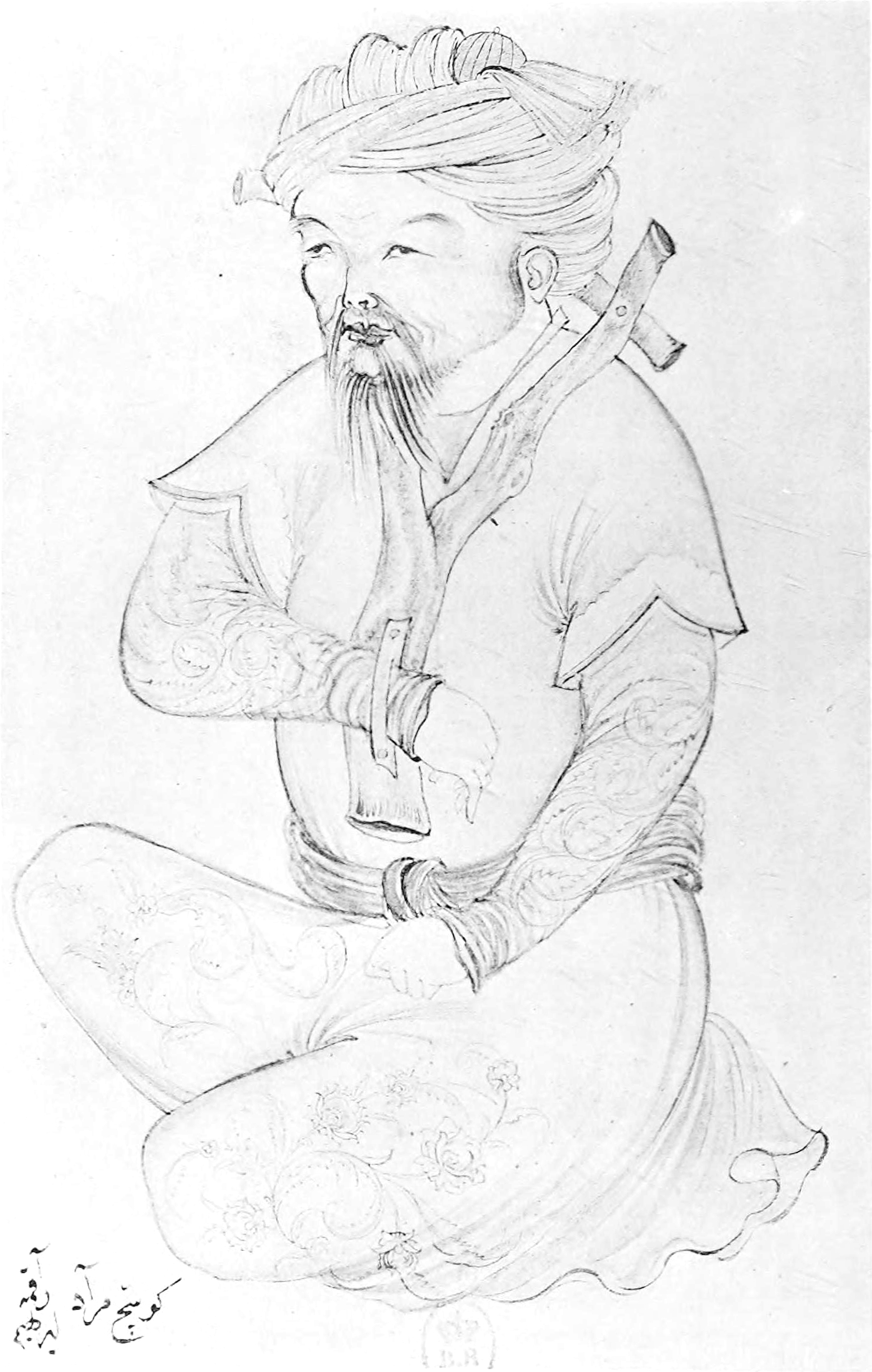
Sultan Murad, as prisoner of the Safavids.

Baysungur was dethroned in 1491 and expelled from Tabriz. He made several unsuccessful attempts to return before he was killed in 1493. Desiring to reconcile both his religious establishment and the famous Sufi order, Rustam (1478–1490) immediately allowed Sheikh Haydar Safavi's sons to return to Ardabil in 1492. Two years later, Ayba Sultan ordered them to be arrested again, as their rise threatened the Ak Qoyunlu, but their youngest son, Ismail, then seven years old, fled and was hidden by supporters in Lahijan.

According to Hasan Rumlu's Ahsan al-tavarikh, in 1496–97, Hasan Ali Tarkhani went to the Ottoman Empire to tell Sultan Bayezid II that Azerbaijan and Persian Iraq were defenceless and suggested that Ahmed Bey, heir to that kingdom, should be sent there with Ottoman troops. Bayezid agreed to this idea, and by May 1497 Ahmad Bey faced Rustam near Araxes and defeated him.

After Ahmad's death, the Aq Qoyunlu became even more fragmented. The state was ruled by three sultans: Alvand Mirza in the west, Uzun Hasan's nephew Qasim in an enclave in Diyarbakir, and Alvand's brother Mohammad in Fars and Iraq-Ajam (killed by violence in the summer of 1500 and replaced by Morad Mirza). The collapse of the Aq Qoyunlu state in Iran began in the autumn of 1501 with the defeat at the hands of Ismail Safavi, who had left Lahijan two years earlier and gathered a large audience of Turkmen warriors. He conquered Iraq-Ajami, Fars and Kerman in the summer of 1503, Diyarbakir in 1507–1508 and Mesopotamia in the autumn of 1508.

=== Sultan Murad (ruled 1497-1508) ===
The last Aq Qoyunlu sultan, Sultan Murad, who hoped to regain the throne with the help of Ottoman troops, was defeated and killed by Ismail's Qizilbash warriors in the last fortress of Rohada, ending the political rule of the Aq Qoyunlu dynasty.

== Governance ==
The leaders of Aq Qoyunlu were from the Begundur or Bayandur clan of the Oghuz Turks and were considered descendants of the semi-mythical founding father of the Oghuz, Oghuz Khagan. The Bayandurs behaved like statesmen rather than warlords and gained the support of the merchant and feudal classes of Transcaucasia (present-day Armenia, Azerbaijan, and Georgia). The Aq Qoyunlu, along with the Qara Qoyunlu, were the last Iranian regimes that used their Chinggisid background to establish their legitimacy. Under Ya'qub Beg, the Chinggisid yasa (traditional nomadic laws of the medieval Turco-Mongols of the Eurasian steppe lands) was dissolved.

The Aq Qoyunlu and main other polities circa 1500

Uzun Hasan's conquest of most of mainland Iran shifted the seat of power to the east, where the Aq Qoyunlu adopted Iranian customs for administration and culture. In the Iranian areas, Uzun Hasan preserved the previous bureaucratic structure along with its secretaries, who belonged to families that had in a number of instances served under different dynasties for several generations. The four top civil posts of the Aq Qoyunlu were all occupied by Iranians, which under Uzun Hasan included; the vizier, who led the great council (divan); the mostawfi al-mamalek, high-ranking financial accountants; the mohrdar, who affixed the state seal; and the marakur "stable master", who supervised the royal court.

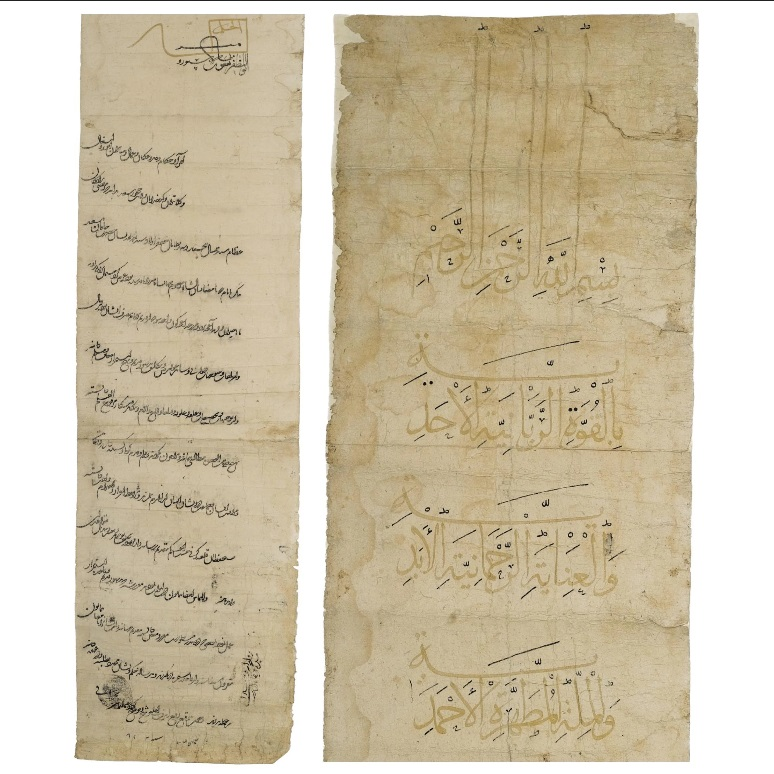
Edict of the Aq-Quyunlu ruler Ya'qub

Culture flourished under the Aq Qoyunlu, who, although of coming from a Turkic background, sponsored Iranian culture. Uzun Hasan himself adopted it and ruled in the style of an Iranian king. Despite his Turkoman background, he was proud of being an Iranian. At his new capital, Tabriz, he managed a refined Persian court. There he utilized the trappings of pre-Islamic Persian royalty and bureaucrats taken from several earlier Iranian regimes. Through the use of his increasing revenue, Uzun Hasan was able to buy the approval of the ulama (clergy) and the mainly Iranian urban elite, while also taking care of the impoverished rural inhabitants.

In letters from the Ottoman Sultans, when addressing the kings of Aq Qoyunlu, such titles as Arabic: ملك الملوك الأيرانية "King of Iranian Kings", Arabic: سلطان السلاطين الإيرانية "Sultan of Iranian Sultans", Persian: شاهنشاه ایران خدیو عجم Shāhanshāh-e Irān Khadiv-e Ajam "Shahanshah of Iran and Ruler of Persia", Jamshid shawkat va Fereydun rāyat va Dārā derāyat "Powerful like Jamshid, flag of Fereydun and wise like Darius" have been used. Uzun Hassan also held the title Padishah-i Irān "Padishah of Iran", which was re-adopted by his distaff grandson Ismail I, founder of the Safavid Empire.

The Aq Qoyunlu realm was notable for being inhabited by many prominent figures, such as the poets Ali Qushji (died 1474), Baba Fighani Shirazi (died 1519), Ahli Shirazi (died 1535), the poet, scholar and Sufi Jami (died 1492) and the philosopher and theologian, Jalal al-Din Davani (died 1503).

== Culture ==
=== Architecture ===
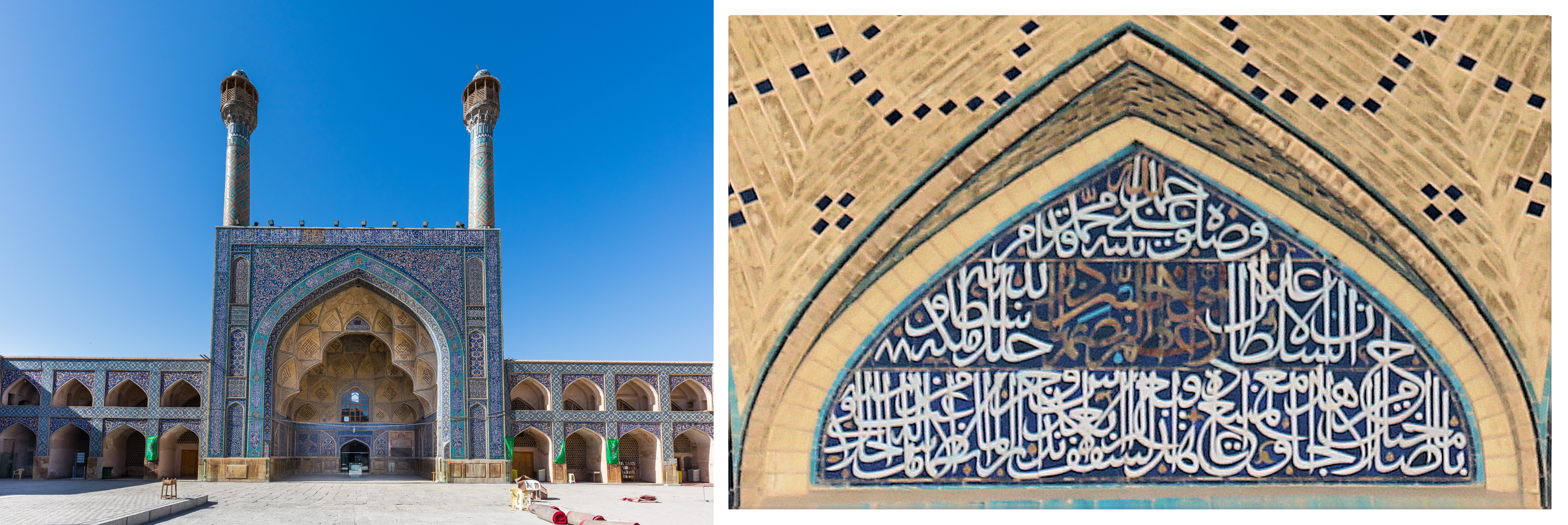
South iwan of the courtyard of the Jameh Mosque of Isfahan, with central Uzun Hasan inscription: "...The most lawful and most exalted sulṭān Abū l-Naṣr Ḥasan bahādur, may god make his kingship and rule eternal...". The iwan was renovated by Uzun Hasan, who also had the entire surface decorated with enamel colored tiles.

Uzun Hassan funded the renovation of mosques in various major centers and smaller towns, and had commemorative inscriptions made to express his support of Islam. He renovated and decorated the South iwan of the courtyard of the Jameh Mosque of Isfahan, where he left a central dedicatory inscription in his name. Uzun Hassn decorated the entire surface of the South iwan with enamel tiles colored in cobalt blue.

Uzun Hassan also created the Uzun Hasan Mosque in his capital of Tabriz, a large and splendid mosque with two minarets, where Uzun Hasan and his son Yaqub were buried.

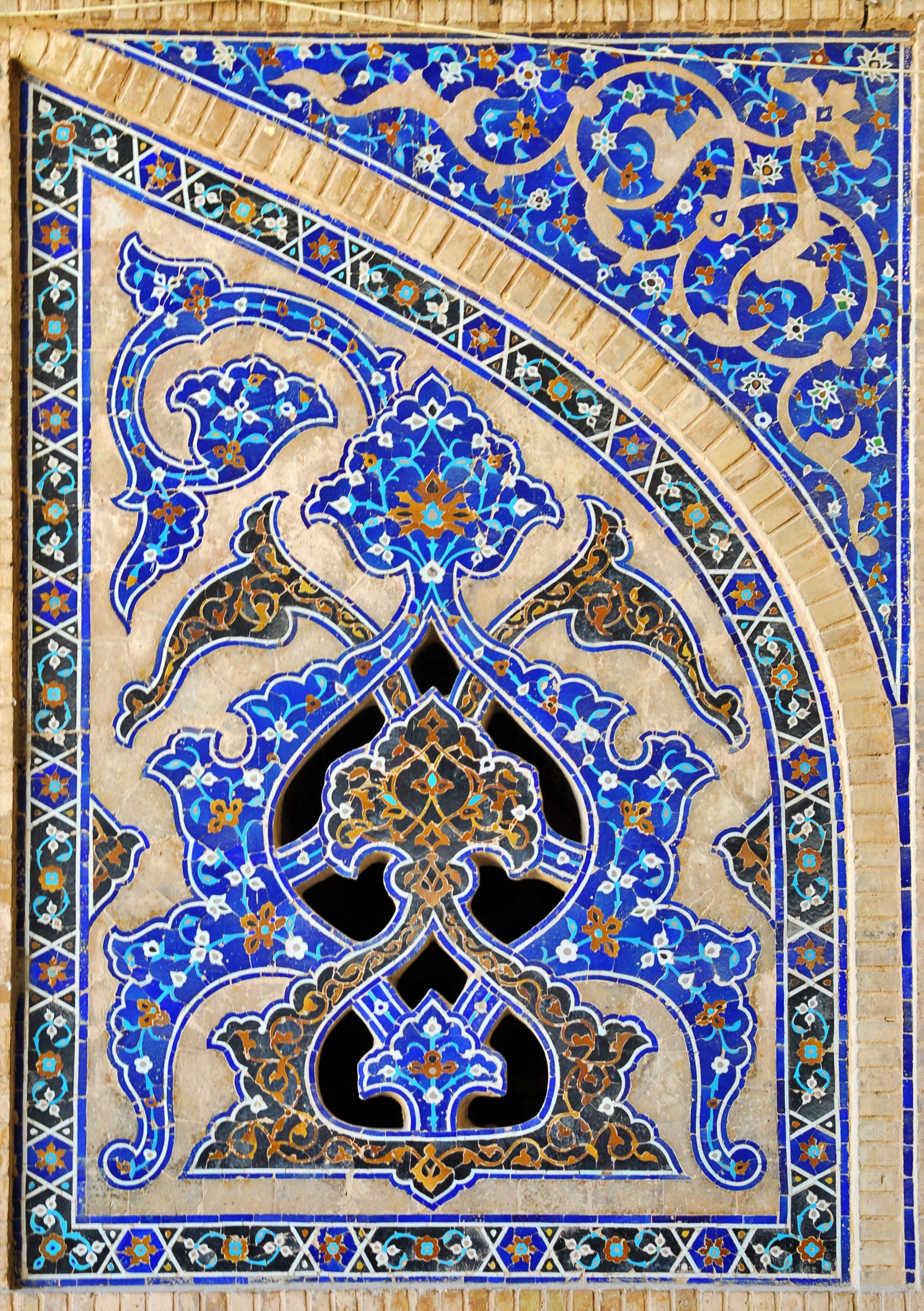
Aq Qoyunlu mo'araq tilework at the South iwan of the Jameh Mosque of Isfahan

Contributions to religious architecture continued under the descendants of Uzun Hasan, as for the Kushk Gate in Isfahan, commissioned under Rustam Beg, son of Uzun Hasan (r.1493-1496).

==== Tilework ====
It is thought that the blue-and-white tiles which can be found in the architectural decorations of Mamluk Syria and Egypt, or in the Ottoman capitals of Bursa and Edirne, were created by itinerant artists coming from the Qara Qoyunlu and Aq Qoyunlu capital of Tabriz. The tilework of the Dome of the Rock in the Old City of Jerusalem was signed by "Abdallah of Tabriz" under a commission of the Ottoman Sultan Süleyman in 1545-1552. The influence of this Tabrizi school was also felt in Istanbul up to the mid-16th century.

The celebrated Hasht Behesht ("Eight Paradises") Palace in Tabriz was also created by Uzun Hasan and completed by his son Yaqub Beg. It was represented in various manuscripts of the period, such as Khamsa of Nizami of 1481 commissioned by Yaqub Beg, and was influential in the development of the Hasht Behesht architectural style in Iran, including the Hasht Behesht in Isfahan.

=== Art of the book ===
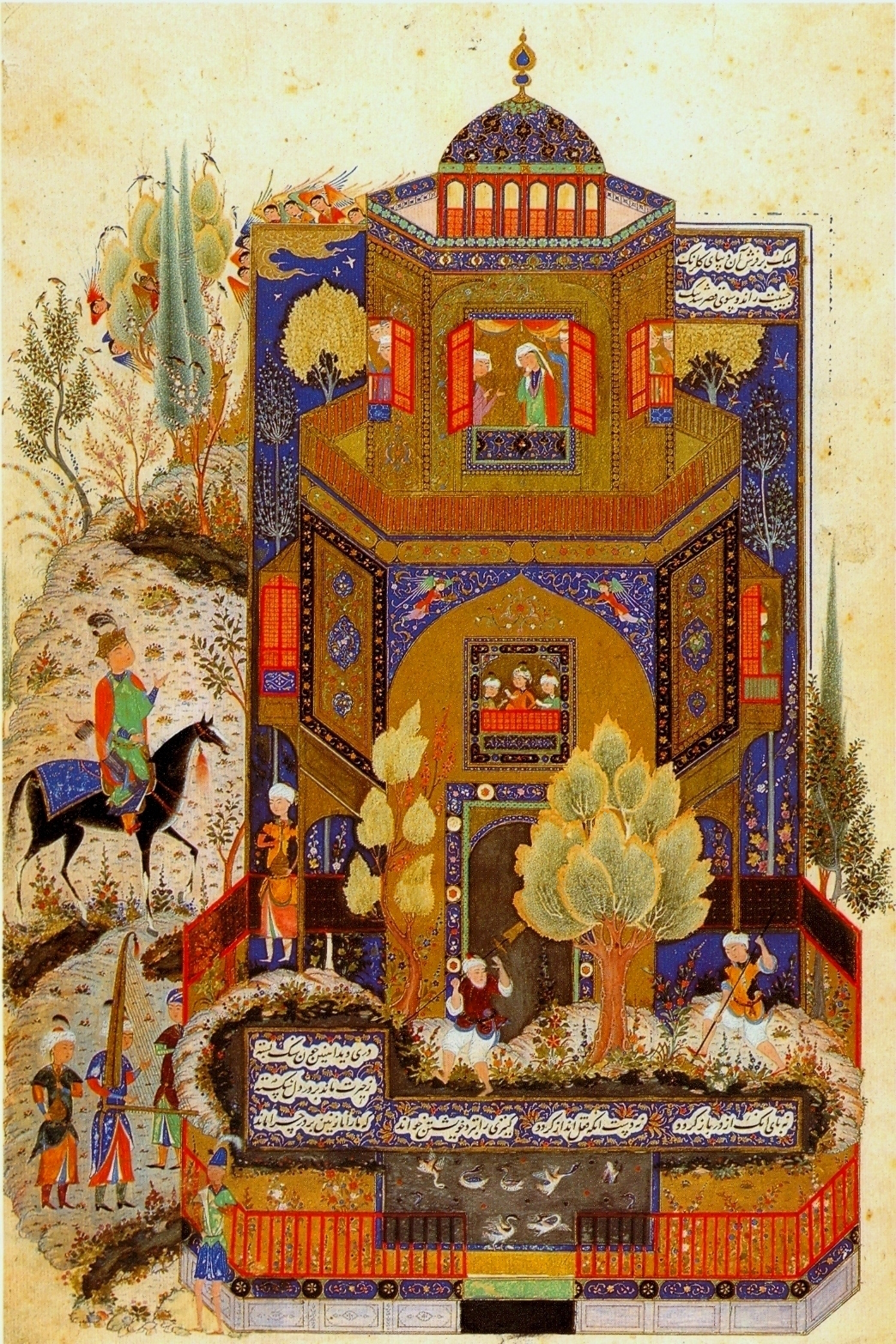
Hasht Behesht Palace in Tabriz, started by Uzun Hasan and completed by his son Yaqub Beg. Khamsa of Nizami (Tabriz, 1481).

Uzun Hasan did not leave many marks in the area of literature. Miniatures became more "provincial" in taste, using bright colors and standardized figures, known as the "Turkman style". His son Yaqub however displayed much more sophisticated tastes, which appeared in both calligraphy and paintings. He sponsored an important workshop in Tabriz at his palace Hasht Behesht ("Eight paradises"), where numerous artists, poets, calligraphers and painters, produced some of the best manuscripts of the period. Their style combined Chinese patterns with Persian repertoire.

==== Persian language literature ====
The Aq Qoyunlu patronized Persian belles-lettres which included poets like Ahli Shirazi, Kamāl al-Dīn Banāʾī Haravī, Bābā Fighānī, Shahīdī Qumī. By the reign of Yaʿqūb, the Aq Qoyunlu court held a fondness for Persian poetry. 16th-century Azerbaijani poet Fuzuli was also born and raised under Aq Qoyunlu rule, writing his first known poem for Shah Alvand Mirza.

Ya'qub's court included several distinguished poets, such as Baba Fighani Shirazi, Ahli Shirazi, Kamal al-Din Bana'i Haravi, and Shahidi Qumi. Another distinguished poet, Hatefi, who was a nephew of the poet Jami, spent five years at Ya'qub's court. Khatai Tabrizi, an Azerbaijani poet of the 15th century, dedicated a mathnawi entitled Yusof wa Zoleykha to Sultan Ya'qub, and Ya'qub even wrote poetry in the Azerbaijani language. Baba Fighani Shirazi dedicated a ceremonial ode (qasida) to Ya'qub, and also a eulogy after the latter's death.

Nur al-Din 'Abd al-Rahman Jami dedicated his poem, Salāmān va Absāl, which was written in Persian, to Yaʿqūb. Yaʿqūb rewarded Jami with a generous gift. Jami also wrote a eulogy, Silsilat al-zahab, which indirectly criticised Yaʿqūb immoral behavior. Yaʿqūb had Persian poems dedicated to him, including Ahli Shirazi's allegorical masnavi on love, Sham' va parvana and Bana'i's 5,000 verse narrative poem, Bahram va Bihruz.

Yaʿqūb's maternal nephew, 'Abd Allah Hatifi, wrote poetry for the five years he spent at the Aq Qoyunlu court.

Uzun Hasan and his son, Khalil, patronized, along with other prominent Sufis, members of the Kobrāvi and Neʿmatallāhi tariqats. According to the Tarikh-e lam-r-ye amini by Fazlallh b. Ruzbehn Khonji Esfahni, the court-commissioned history of Yaqub's reign, Uzun Hasan built close to 400 structures in the Aq Qoyunlu region for the purpose of Sufi communal retreat.

==== Miniatures ====
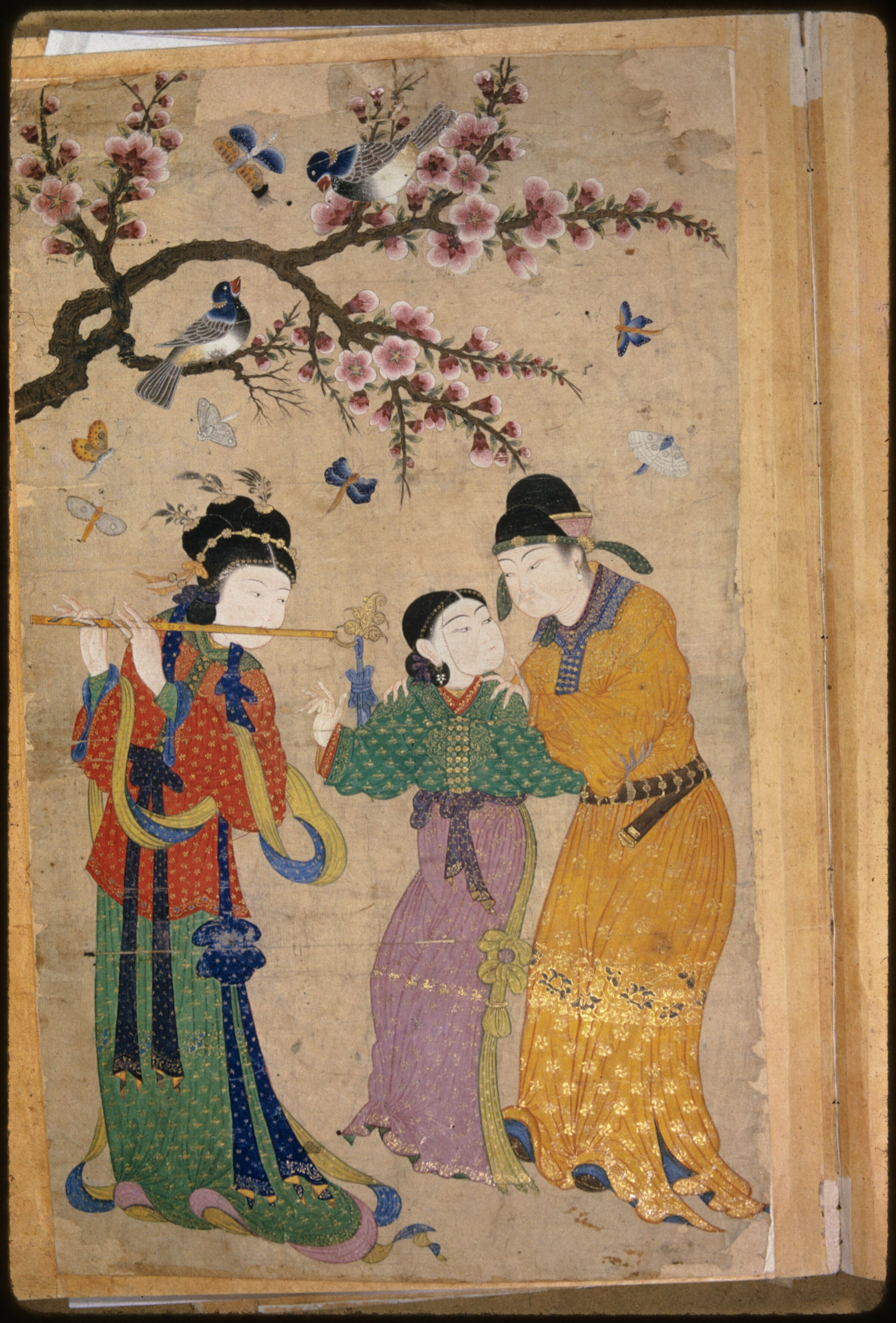
Nobles beneath a Blossoming Branch, Shaykhi, Aq Qoyunlu Tabriz, c. 1470–90.

The Aq Qoyunlu commissioned numerous manuscripts with lavish miniatures, such as the Khamsa of Nizami (Tabriz, 1481) of Yaqub Beg, the Ya'qub Beg Album or the more popular Khavaran-nama. Yaqub Beg employed two main master miniaturists, Shaykhi and Darvish Muhammad, for the illustrations of his manuscripts. The Khamsa of Nizami (Tabriz, 1481) is considered as "the supreme and ultimate fruit of his artistic patronage". The pictorial style has been qualified as having "ecstatic intensity". One of the most famous miniatures added by Yaqub Beg is the Bahram Gur in the Green Pavilion, painted by the Herat artist Shaykhi. Compared to the balanced Timurid Herat style of Bihzad for example, this miniature style uses a much more intense color palette, with acid greens and vivid blues, and abundant vegetation that seems to engulf the protagonists.

Another famous painting created under the patronage of Yaqub Beg is that of the Hasht Behesht Palace in Tabriz, a palace started by Uzun Hasan and completed by his son Yaqub Beg. Here, Yaqub's palace in Tabriz is used as the setting for the Classical composition of the romantic scene Khosrow under the windows of Shirin.

Shaykhi, one of the main painters at the court of Yaqub, is also well-known for making Chinese-style paintings, to which he sometimes afixed his own signature, such as Two Young Women in Chinese Style Costume Seated on a Sofa or Nobles beneath a Blossoming Branch. Turkmen artists were generally prompt to experiment with new ideas, including Chinese ones or the works of Muhammad Siyah Qalam, in contrast with the more timid style of the Timurid court. Another characteristic of Turkmen miniatures, and particularly those of Shaykhi, compared to Timurid ones, is the rise of single-sheet illustrations, meaning that many paintings were no longer devoted to simply illustrating a given text, but were stand-alone artistic endeavours, creating images "of epic size and ambition".

Besides these miniatures in fine court style, there was also a quantity of more prosaic contemporary illustrated manuscripts, using a simpler and more stereotypical artistic idiom, belonging to the Turkoman Commercial style, and often centered around the city of Shiraz.

==== Turkic language literature ====
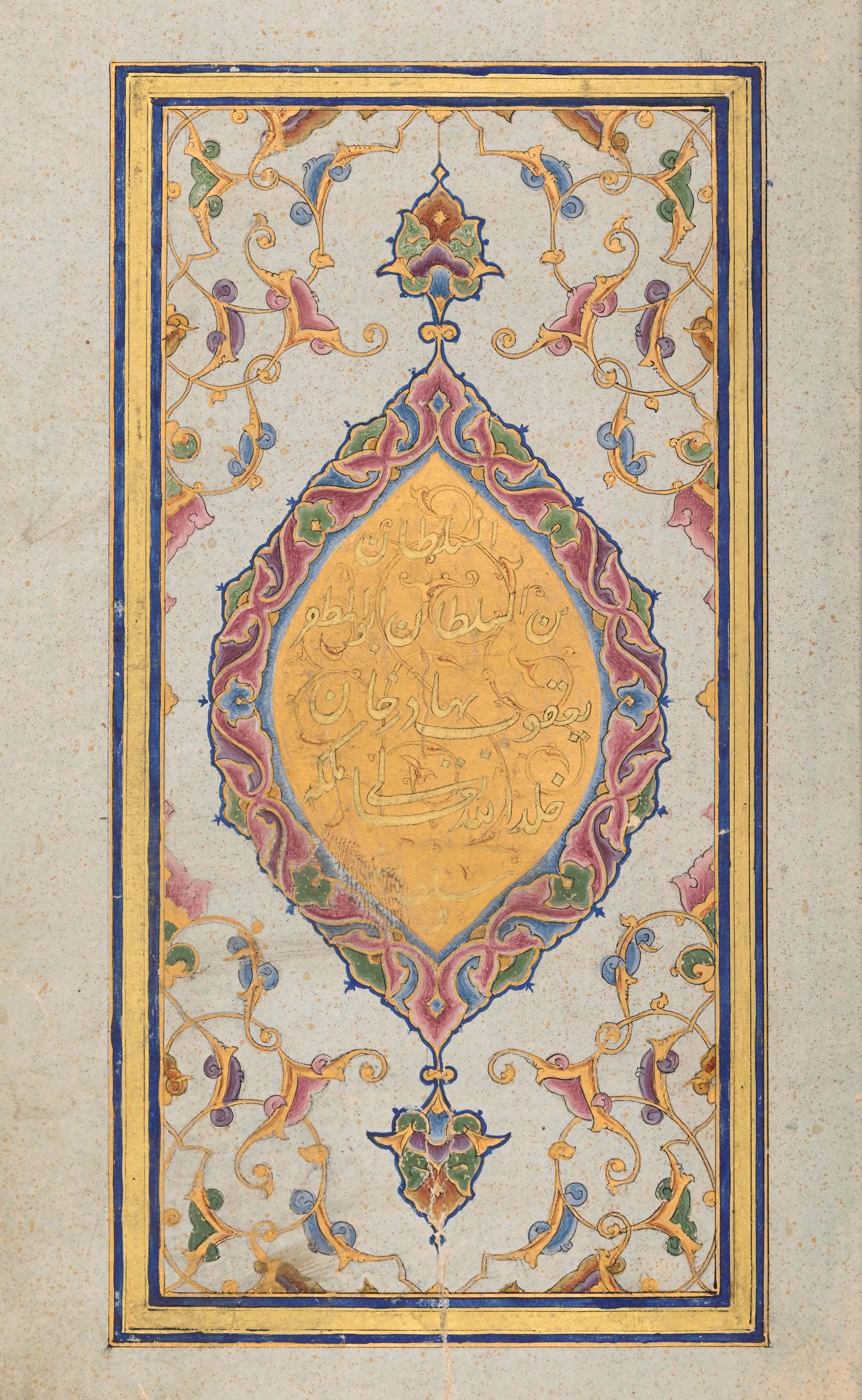
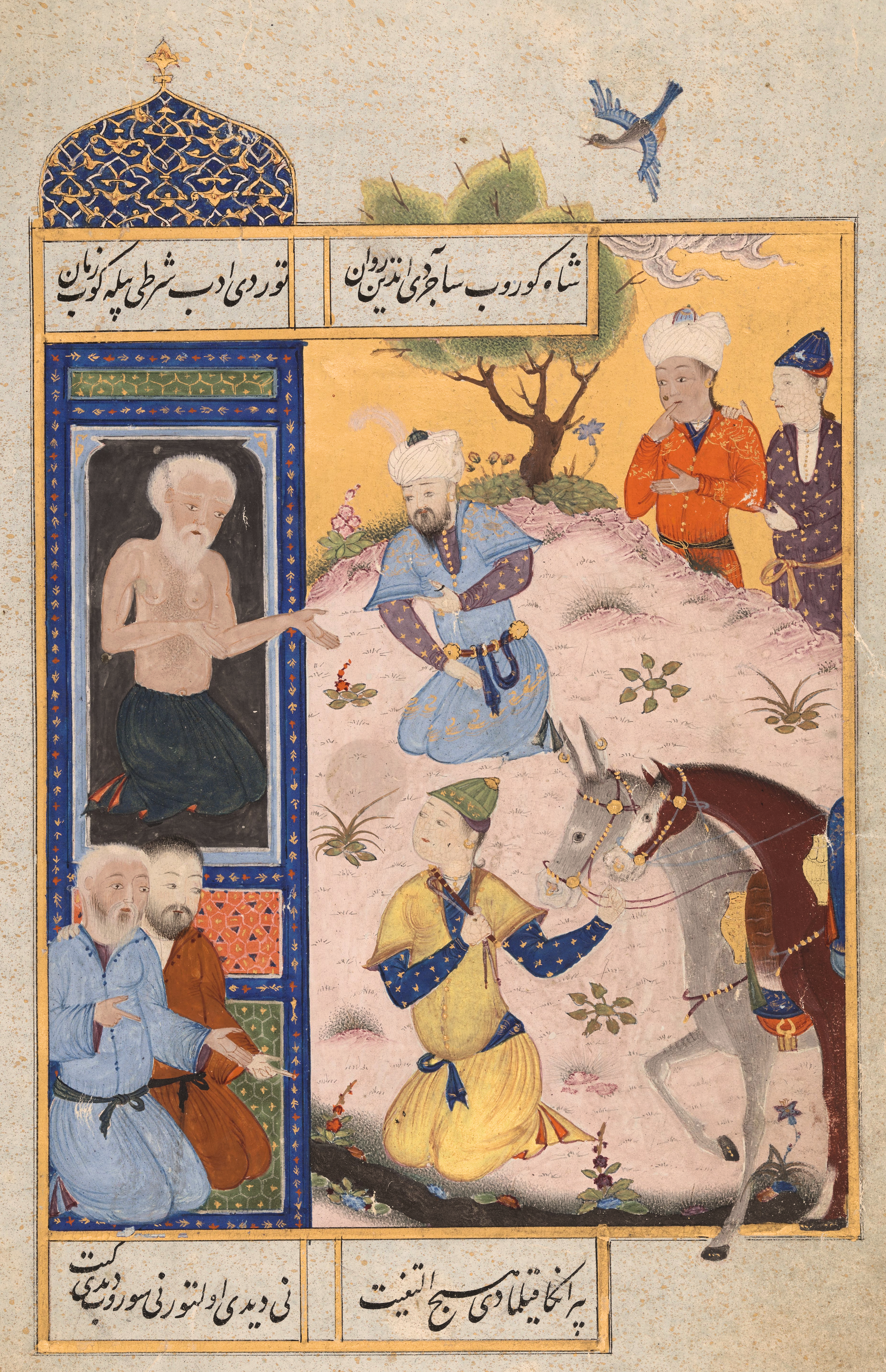
Frontispiece and Turkman style miniature from the Chaghatai language Makhzan al-asrar, commissioned by Yaqub Sultan in 1478, Tabriz.

Uzun Hassan was more of a military man and was not very involved in literary creations. Still, he is said to have translated Prophetic Traditions and made a version of the Qor'an in Turkish.

Sultan Khalil, is known to have commissioned a rare but refined illustrated manuscript in "Azarbayjani Turkish", the Diwān of Hidayat (Chester Beatty Library, MS 401). An adaption in Oghuz Turk of the Dīwān of ‘Alī Shīr Nawā’ī (1441-1501), the greatest representative of Chagatai literature who was active in the Timurid court in Herat, is also known to have likely been commissioned by Sultan Khalil. It is sometimes called The Dīwān of the Aq Qoyunlu admirers.

Some of the works commissioned by Yaqub Sultan were in Chagatai (Eastern Turkic), such as a Divan of Ali-Shir Nava'i (1480), or a Makhzan al-asrar (1478) made in Tabriz, "painted with Chinese landscapes, flowering trees, and birds in gold".

== Administration ==
The Aq Qoyunlu administration encompassed two sections; the military caste, which mostly consisted of Turkomans, but also had Iranian tribesmen in it. The other section was the civil staff, which consisted of officials from established Persian families.

== Military ==
=== Evolution ===
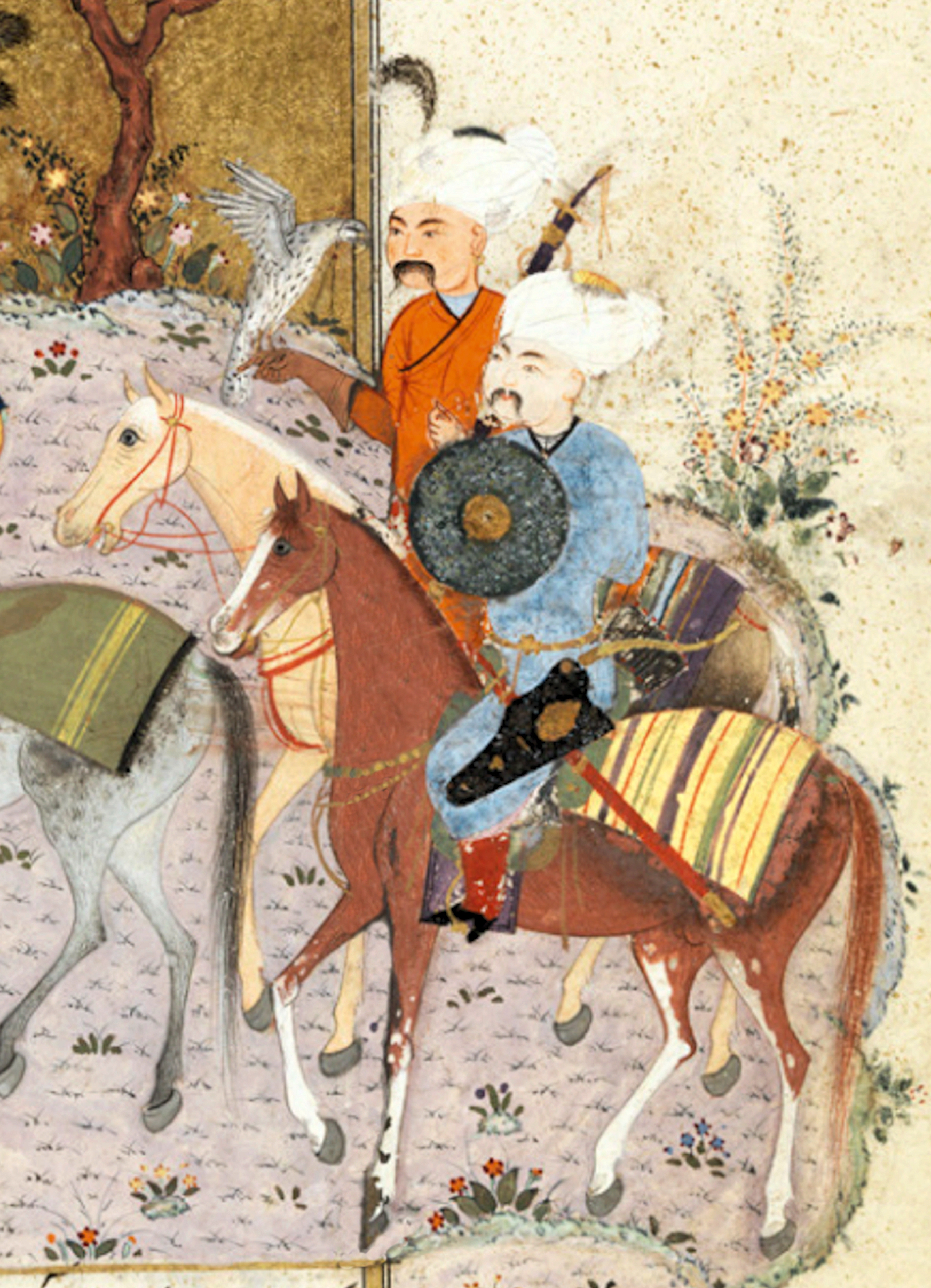
Aq Qoyunlu princely guards on horse. Divan of Hidayat, 1478

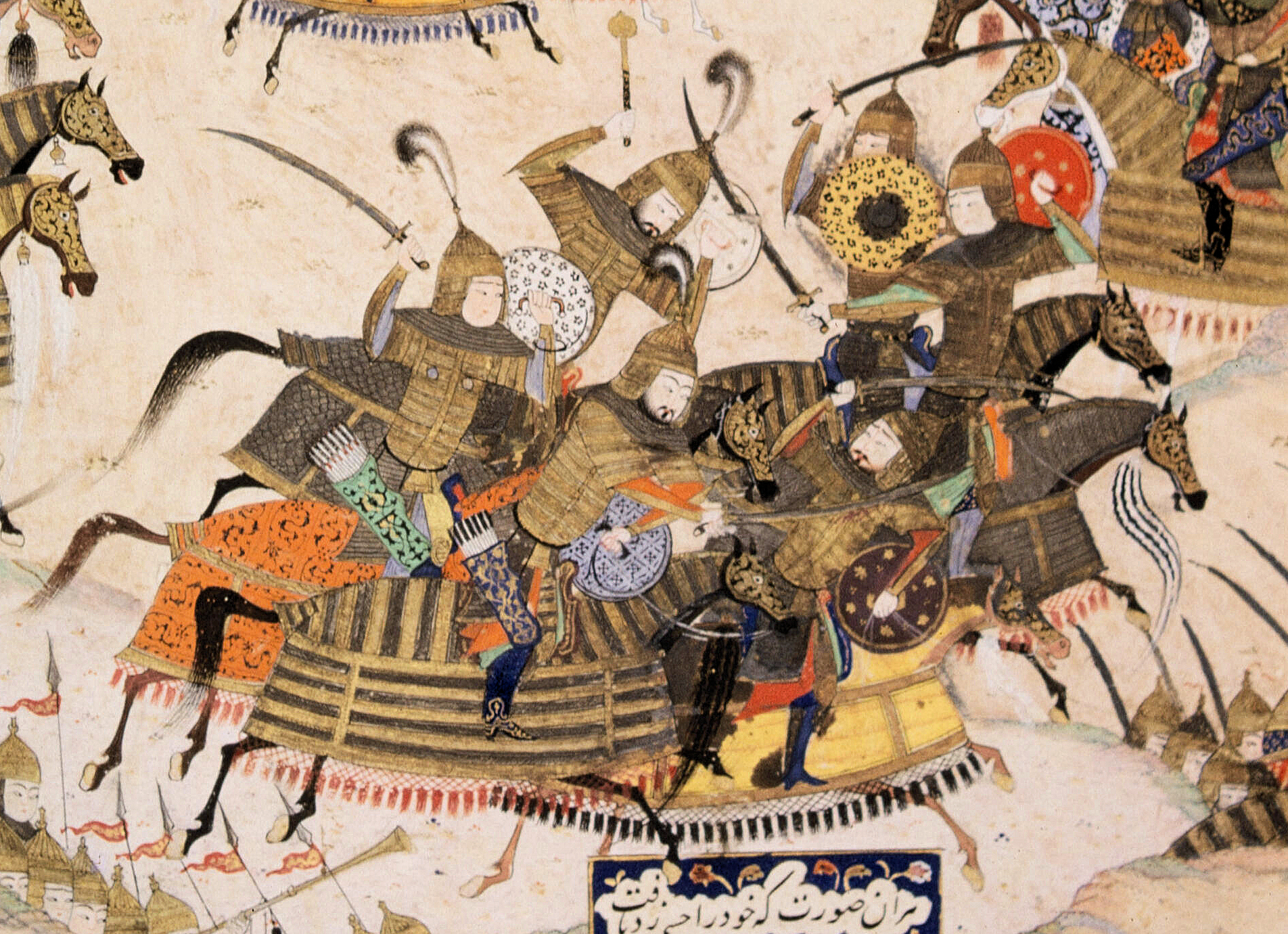
Battle scene from an Aq Qoyunlu miniature of the Khamsa of Nizami (TSM H762). Tabriz, painted in 1481

The military of the Aq Qoyunlu initially reflected their rather loose political structure. Decisions were taken by a council (kengač) of amirs and tribal chiefs (boy ḵānları), whose decision the sultan had to follow. A small army largely composed of tribal levies was in charge of securing pastoral lands, and essentially supported themselves through their own lands and booty. The sultan also possessed a force of personal guards (ḵawāṣṣ) provided by various nomadic groups.

Following their surprise victory over the Qara Qoyunlu confederation, many tribes previously under Qara Qoyunlu control joined the Aq Qoyunlu. The conquering armies of Uzun Hasan grew tremendously in size, probably exceeding 100,000 men. Even Sultan Khalil, as Aq Qoyunlu Governor of Fars, is reported to have had a force of 25,000 cavalry and 10,000 infantry, plus auxiliaries. The core power of this large military resided in the strength of its cavalry, while the absence of firearms was its principal weakness.

Besides the traditional clans integrated in the Aq Qoyunlu confederate system, some other clans participated sporadically in Aq Qoyunlu military operations, such as the Turkmen Döğer, the Kurdish Bulduqani, and the Arab Banu Rabi'ah.

=== Structure ===
The organization of the Aq Qoyunlu army was based on the fusion of military traditions from both nomadic and settled cultures. The ethnic background of Aq-Qoyunlu troops were quite heterogeneous as it consisted of 'sarvars' of Azerbaijan, people of Persia and Iraq, Iranzamin askers, dilavers of Kurdistan, Turkmen mekhtars and others.

Military structure of the Aq Qoyunlu

Padishah (Sovereign)	Head of Defence Ministry; Tavachi dari
Head of Guards; Qorchu bashi	Chief commander over army units (Amir al-Umara – Askeri qoshun)	Flag bearer (Emir alem)	Tavachi	Kadi nazir	Amir bitikchi
Royal bodyguard Boy nuker	Guards (qorchu)	Engineer corps	Chief Horseman (Emir Ahur)
Garrisons	The superintendent of the hunt Amir-i Shikar
Artillery	Military inspector Ariz-i Lashkar
Road guards	Quartermaster; Bukaul-i Lashkar
Regular army (Jeri)	Search units Balarguchi
Nomad units Mir-i el	Army Inspector; Amiri Jandar	Jandar units
Head of Food Supply; Rikabdar
Head of Auxiliary troops Yasaul bashi	Yasaul units
Head of Camping; Yurtchu bashi	Yurtchu units
Messenger; Chavush
Jasus
Secret agents / spies Sahib Habar
Jagdiul
Head of Internal Affairs; Eshik Agasi Bashi

== Legacy ==
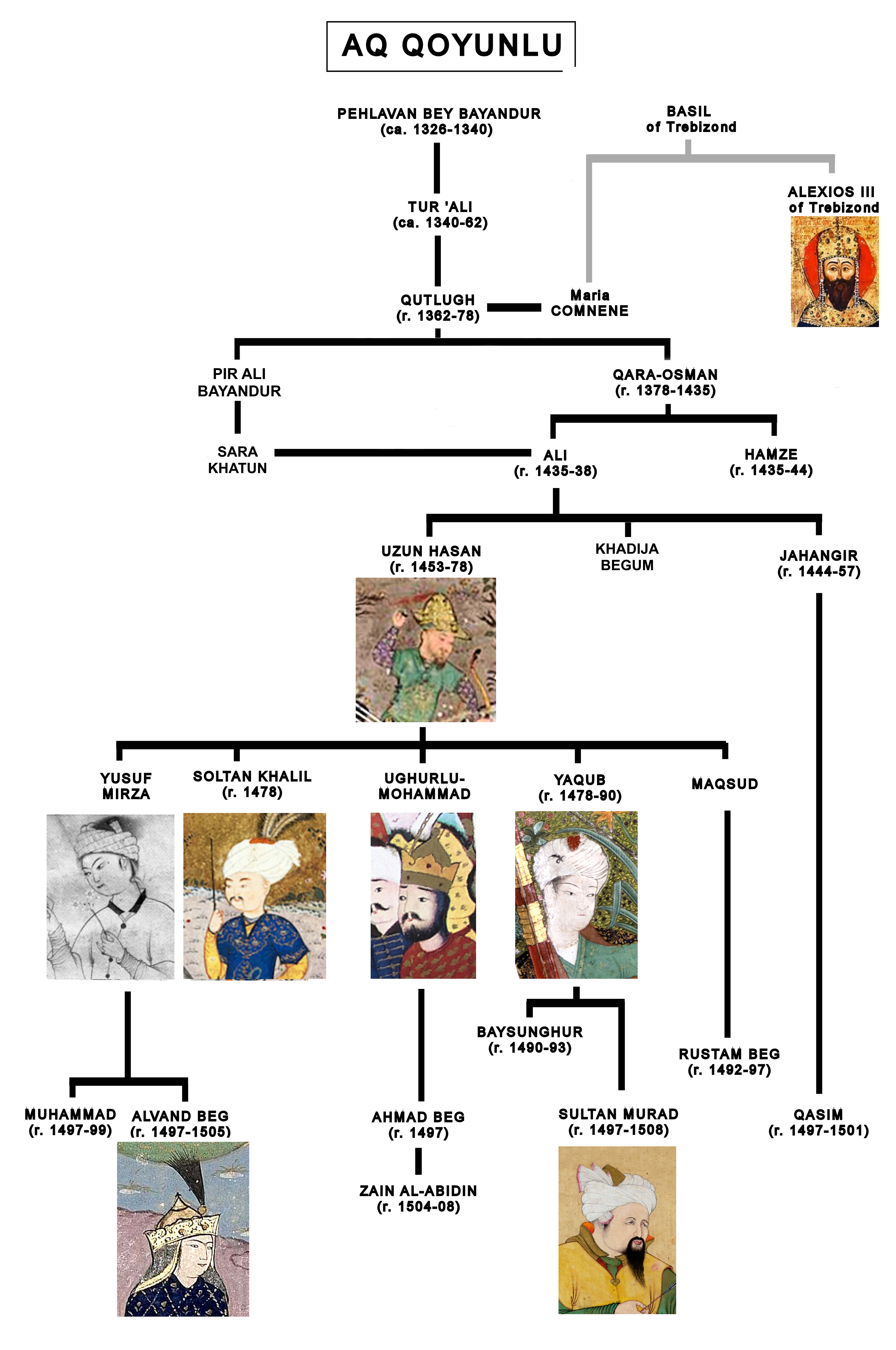
Genealogy of the Aq Qoyunlu dynasty.

Despite their rivalry, the Safavids formed in a certain sense the posterity of the Aq Qoyunlu, as shown by the extent of their marital connections: Junaid, hereditary leader of the Safavid order and grandfather of the future founder of the Safavid Empire Shah Ismail, married an Aq Qoyunlu princess (Uzun Hassan's sister, Khadija Khatun). Their son Haydar Safavi also married a daughter of Uzun Hasan, Alamshah Halime Begum, a union out of which was born Shah Ismail. Shah Ismail's main wife was Tajlu Khanum, an Aq Qoyunlu princess of the Mawsillu tribe, giving birth to his successor Tahmasp I. Tahmasp I' main wife was Sultanum Begum, also an Aq Qoyunlu princess of the Mawsillu tribe, giving birth to Ismail II and Mohammad Khodabanda. Finally, the Safavids too were heirs to "a tribally constituted military elite" and encountered similar difficulties in forming a stable government.

== Coinage ==
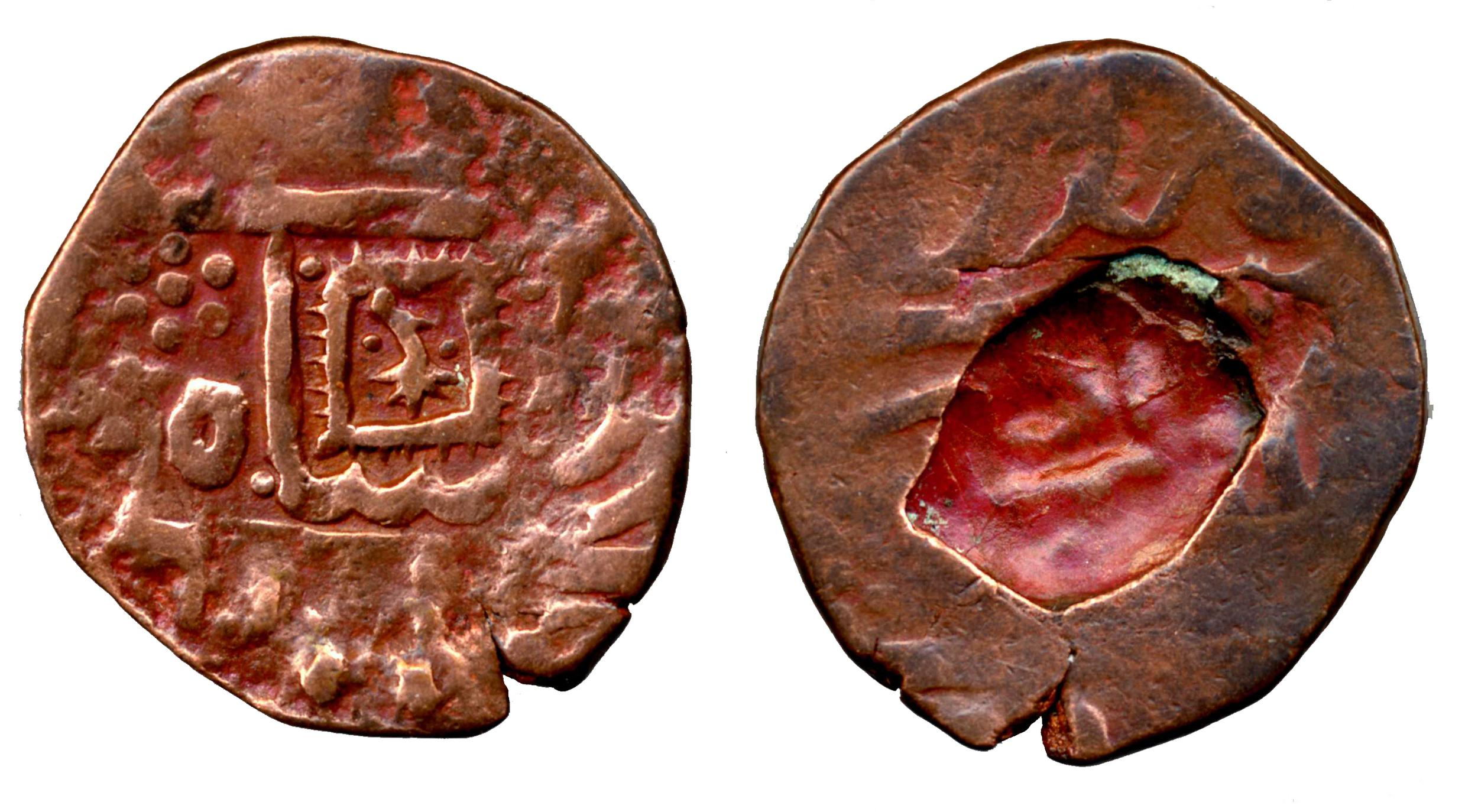
Jahangir's coin, after 1444 AD.

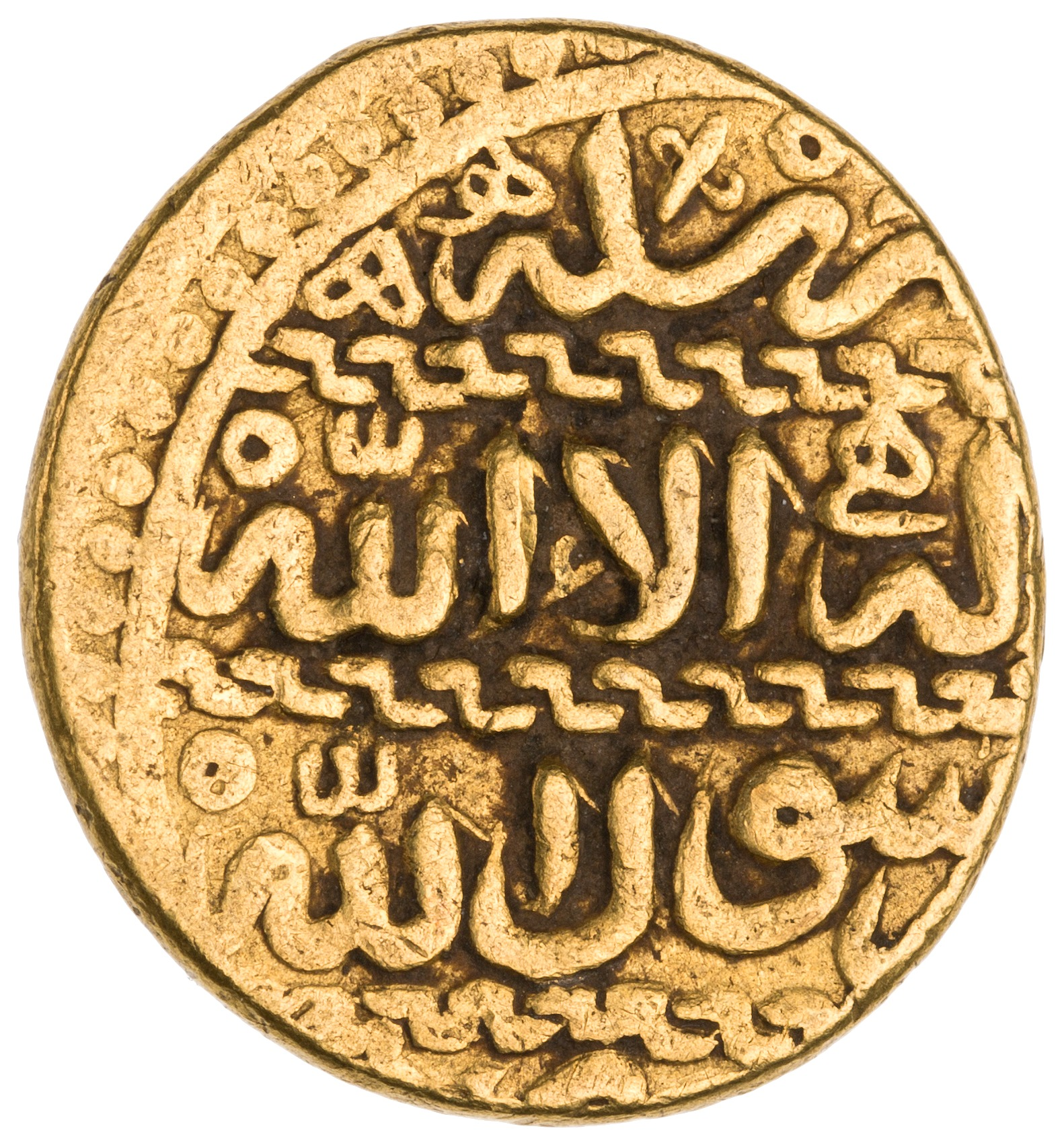
Uzun Hasan's coin minted in Amid (Diyarbakir), c. 1453–1478 AD.

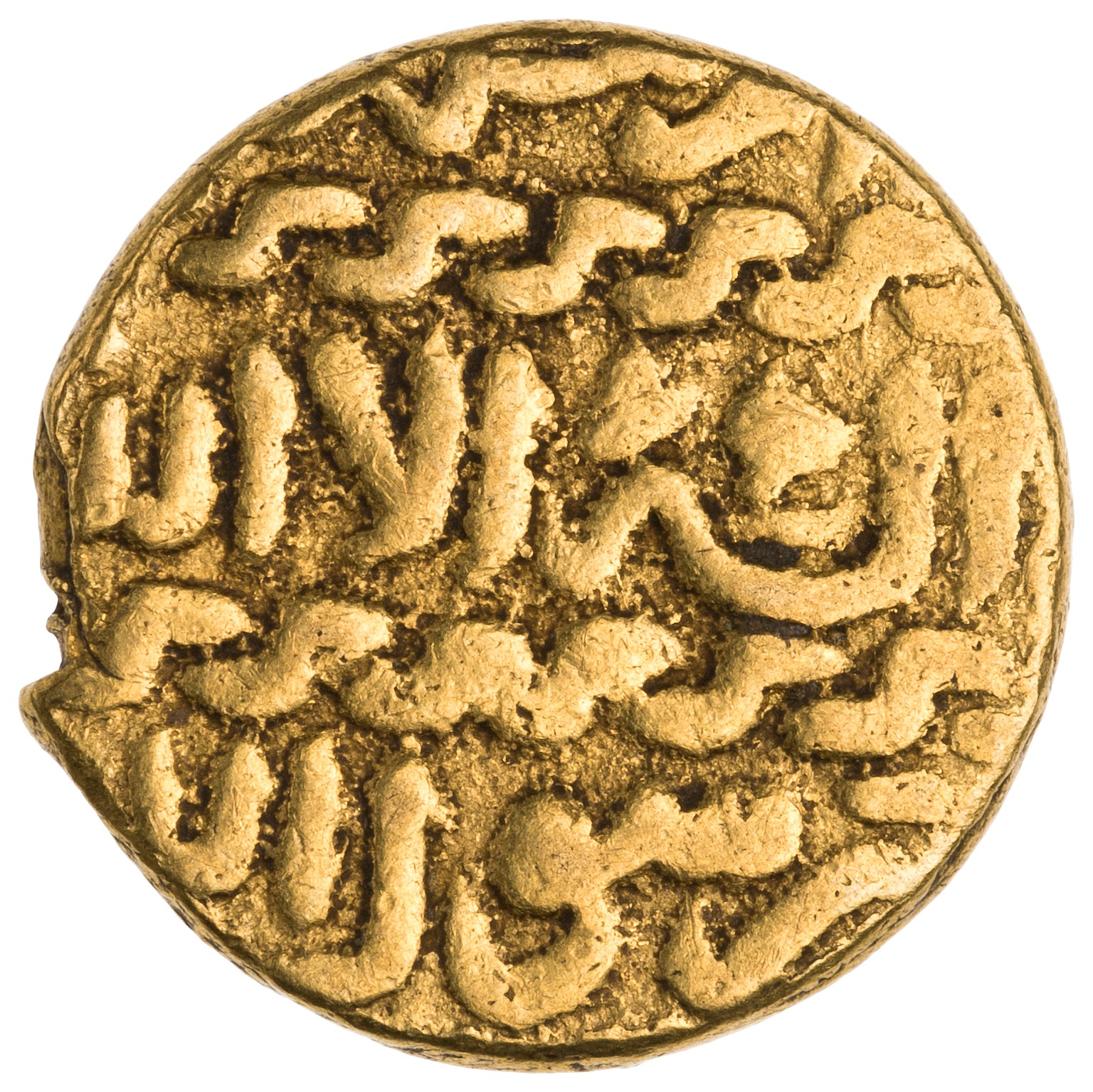
Sultan Yaqub's coin, c. 1479–1490 AD.

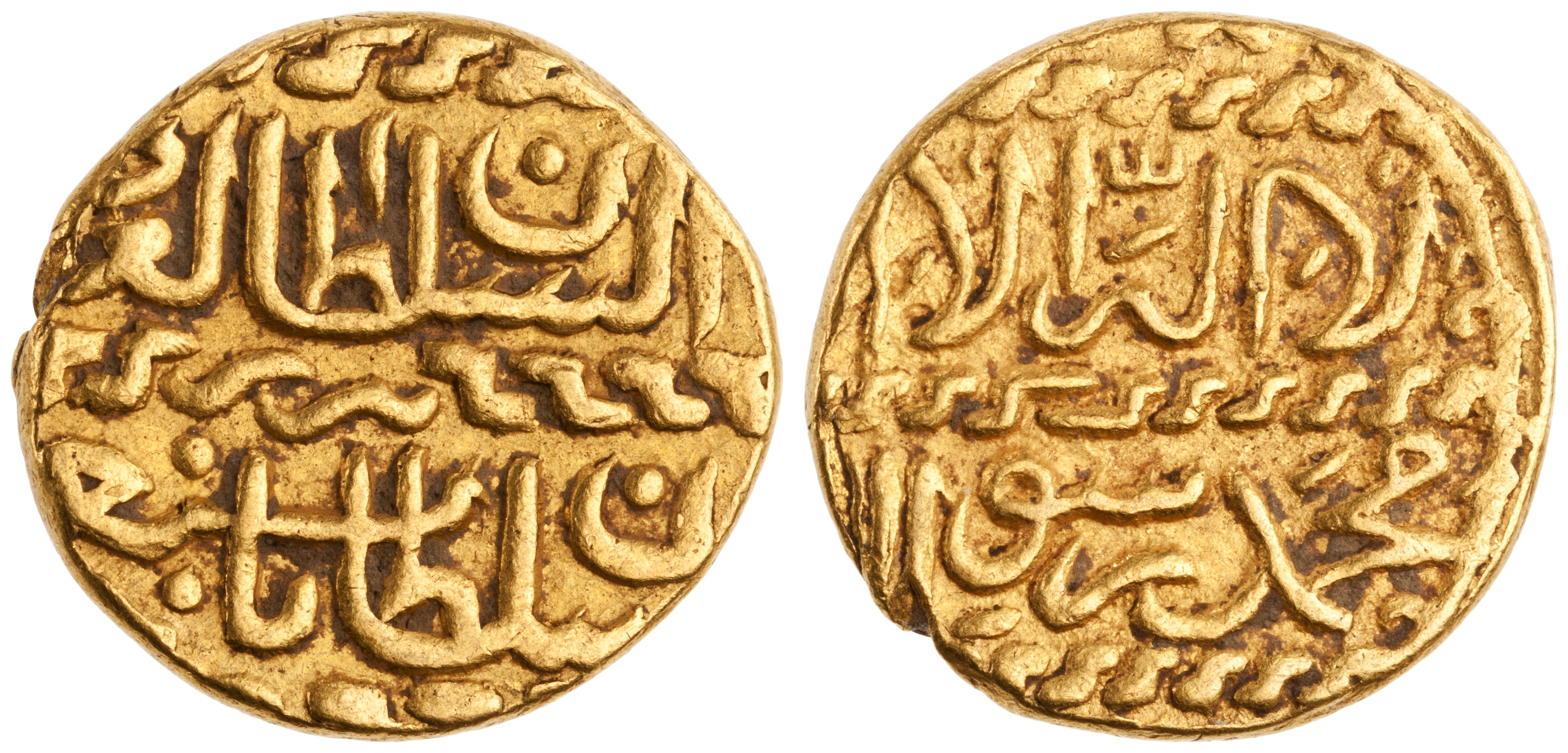
Baysunghur's coin minted in Tabriz, c. 1490–1493 AD.

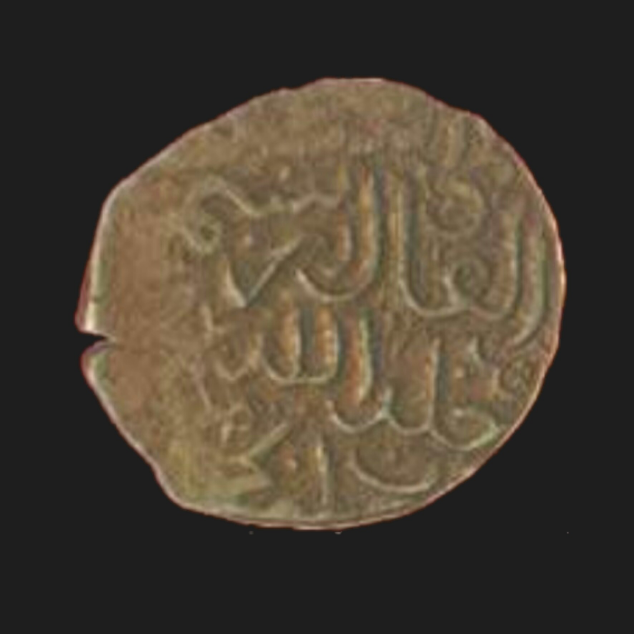
Sultan Rustam's coin, 1495 AD.

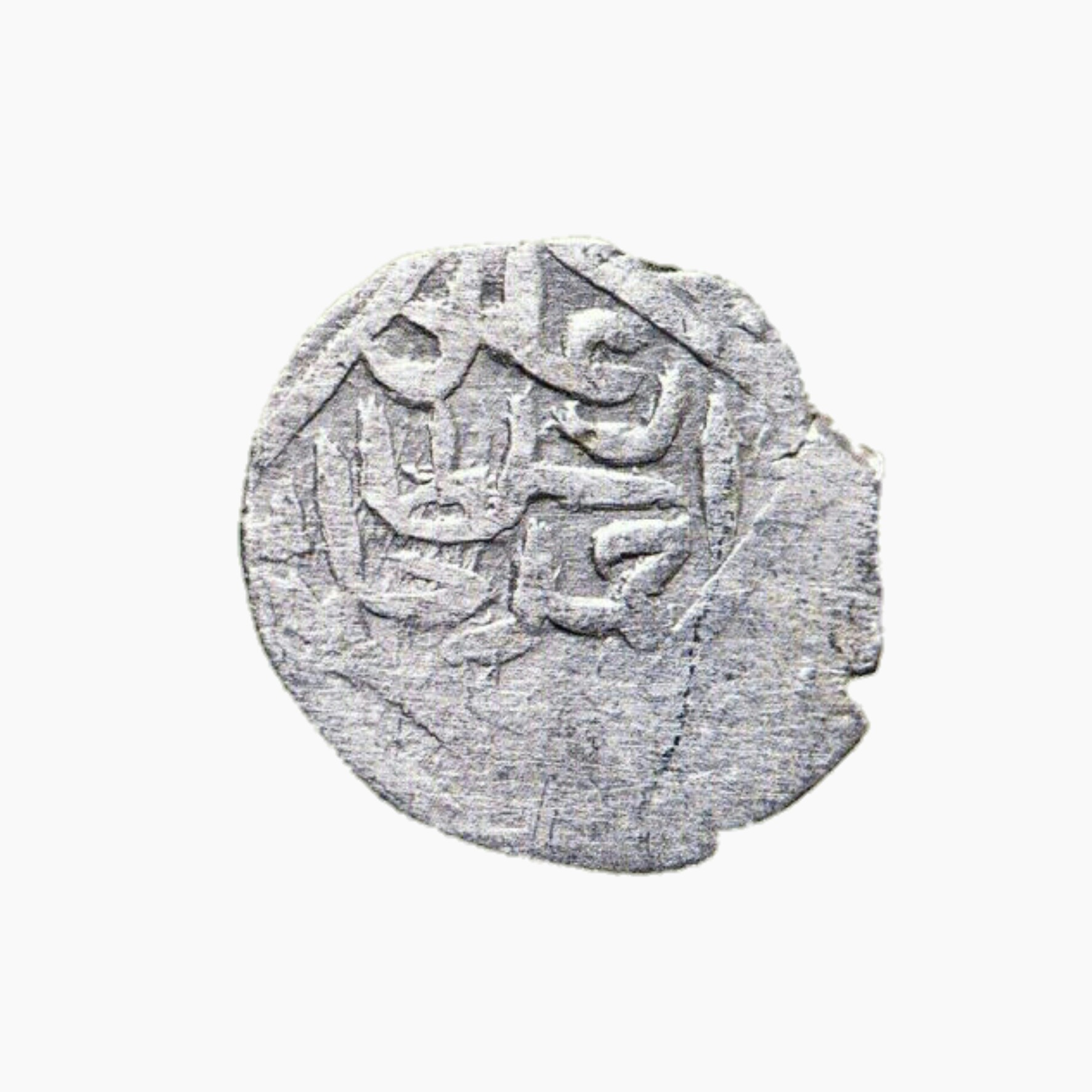
Sultan Ahmad's coin minted in Tabriz, 1497 AD.

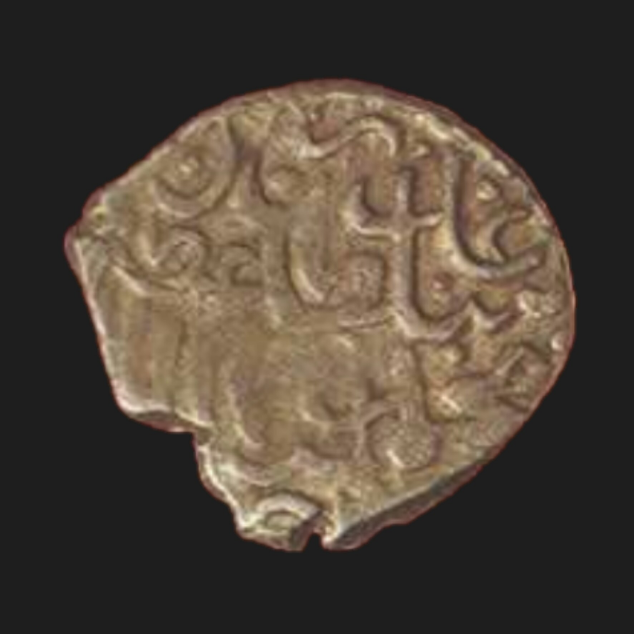
Coin of Sultan Muhammad.

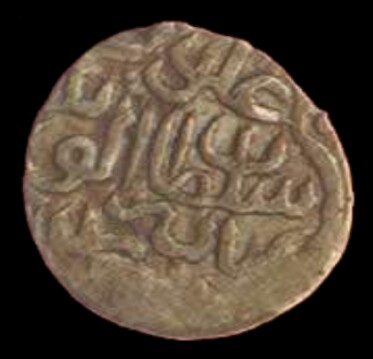
Sultan Alwand's coin.

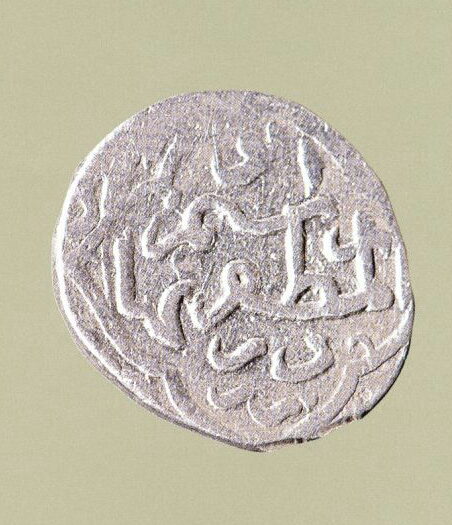
Sultan Murad's coin.

== See also ==
- List of rulers of Aq Qoyunlu
- Turkmen invasions of Georgia
- Bozulus

== Bibliography ==
- Bosworth, Clifford (1996) The New Islamic Dynasties: A Chronological and Genealogical Manual (2nd ed.) Columbia University Press, New York, ISBN 0-231-10714-5
- Javadi, H.; Burrill, K. (May 24, 2012). "Azerbaijan x. Azeri Turkish Literature". Encyclopaedia Iranica. "Among the Azeri poets of the 15th century mention should be made of Ḵaṭāʾi Tabrizi. He wrote a maṯnawi entitled Yusof wa Zoleyḵā, and dedicated it to the Aqqoyunlu Sultan Yaʿqub (r. 1478–90), who himself wrote poetry in Azeri Turkish."
- Daʿadli, Tawfiq (2019). Esoteric Images: Decoding the Late Herat School of Painting. Brill.
- Dastan, Nasrin (22 November 2025). Chinese Elements in Persian Paintings. Springer Nature. ISBN 978-981-95-1541-7.
- Eagles, Jonathan (2014). Stephen the Great and Balkan Nationalism: Moldova and Eastern European History. I.B. Tauris. ISBN 978-1780763538.
- Erkinov, Aftandil (2015). "From Herat to Shiraz: the Unique Manuscript (876/1471) of 'Alī Shīr Nawā'ī's Poetry from Aq Qoyunlu Circle". Cahiers d'Asie centrale. 24. Translated by Bean, Scott: 47–79.
- Lane, George (2016). "Turkoman confederations, the (Aqqoyunlu and Qaraqoyunlu)". In Dalziel, N.; MacKenzie, J.M. (eds.). The Encyclopedia of Empire. pp. 1–5. doi:10.1002/9781118455074.wbeoe193. ISBN 978-1118455074.
- Langaroodi, Reza Rezazadeh; Negahban, Farzin (2015). "Āq-qūyūnlū". In Madelung, Wilferd; Daftary, Farhad (eds.). Encyclopaedia Islamica Online. Brill Online. ISSN 1875-9831.
- Lingwood, C. G. (2011). "The qebla of Jāmi is None Other than Tabriz": ʿAbd al-Rahmān Jāmi and Naqshbandi Sufism at the Aq Qoyunlu Royal Court". Journal of Persianate Studies. 4 (2): 233–245. doi:10.1163/187471611X600404.
- Lingwood, Chad G. (2014). Politics, Poetry, and Sufism in Medieval Iran. Brill.
- Markiewicz, Christopher (2019). The Crisis of Kingship in Late Medieval Islam: Persian Emigres and the Making of Ottoman Sovereignty. Cambridge University Press. ISBN 978-1108492140.
- Melvin-Koushki, Matthew (2011). "The Delicate Art of Aggression: Uzun Hasan's "Fathnama" to Qaytbay of 1469". Iranian Studies. 44 (2 (MARCH)): 193–214. doi:10.1080/00210862.2011.541688. JSTOR 23033324.
- Morby, John (2002) Dynasties of the World: A Chronological and Genealogical Handbook (2nd ed.) Oxford University Press, Oxford, England, ISBN 0-19-860473-4
- Thomas, David; Chesworth, John A., eds. (2015). Christian-Muslim Relations. A Bibliographical History:Central and Eastern Europe, Asia, Africa and South America. Vol. 7. Brill. ISBN 978-9004298484.
- Woods, John E. (1 January 1999). The Aqquyunlu: Clan, Confederation, Empire. Salt Lake City: The University of Utah Press. ISBN 978-0874805659.
