= Hidayat (poet) =

15th-century Azerbaijani poet

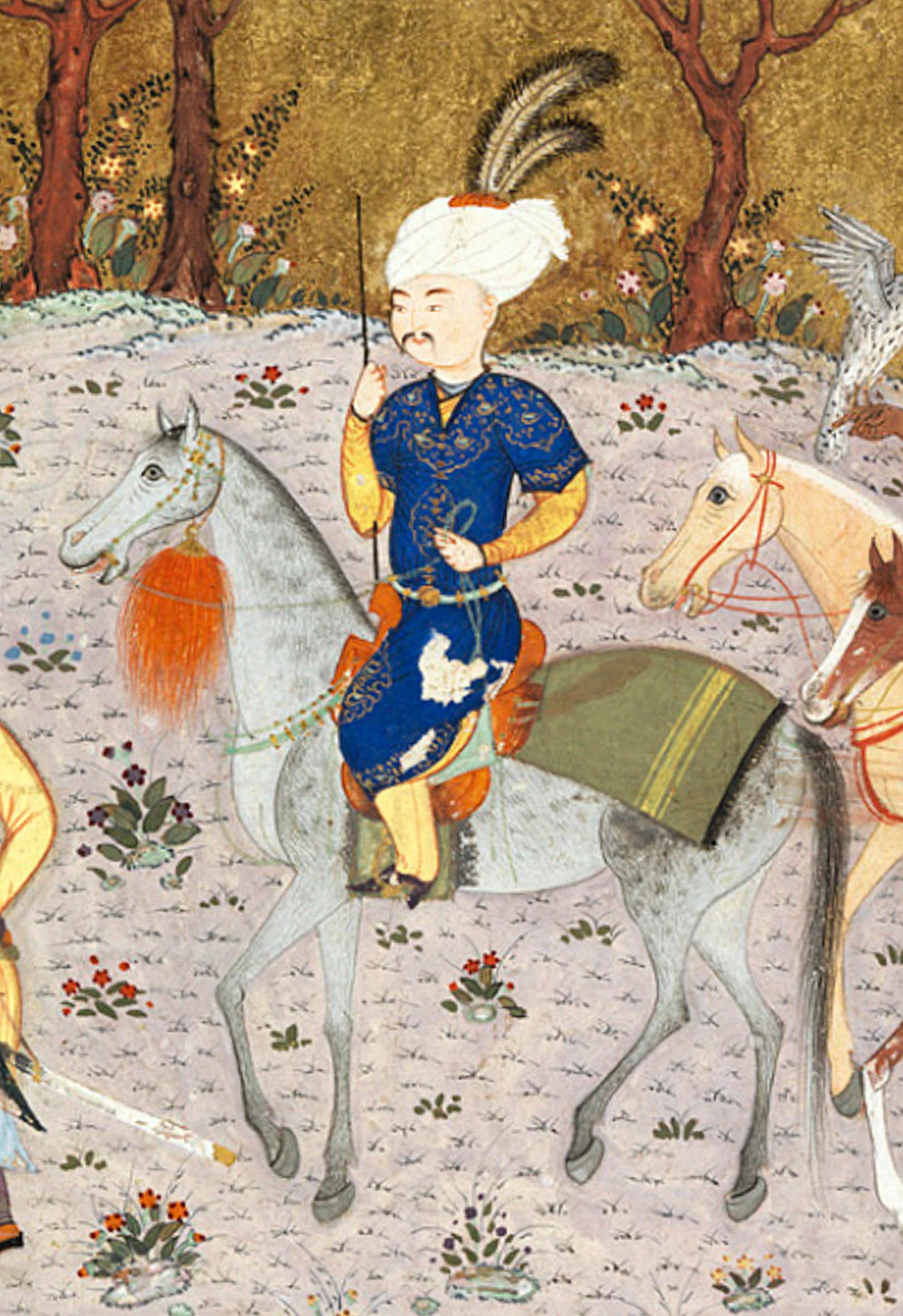
Contemporary depiction of Aq Qoyunlu ruler Sultan Khalil, in a miniature from the manuscript of Divan of Hidayat (1478).

Amir Afsahaddin Hidayatullah Bey (Azerbaijani: Əmir Əfsəhəddin Hidayətullah bəy, امیر افساء الدین هدایت الله بیگ), better known by his pen name Hidayat (Hidayət, هدایت), was a 15th-century poet and statesman who served under the Aq Qoyunlus. His only surviving work is a divan (a collection of short poems) in Azerbaijani: the Divan of Hidayat (Chester Beatty Library, T 401).

== Life ==
Most of what is known about Hidayat's life comes from his poetry. It has been established that his real name was Afsahaddin Hidayatullah and that he lived in the second half of the 15th century. He served as an amir under the Aq Qoyunlu ruler Uzun Hasan and was a Shia Muslim. Hidayat resided in Shiraz with Aq Qoyunlu Sultan-Khalil until he ascended to the throne in 1478 and then accompanied him to Tabriz when he came into power. However, when Ya'qub Beg took over later that year, Hidayat was sent to Iraq against his wishes. The precise date of his death is uncertain, but it is known that he died before December 1497.

== Poetry ==
The only known literary work attributed to him is his divan in Azerbaijani language, entitled Dīvān-i Hidāyat. The majority of his poetry centred around themes of love and separation from a beloved. Additionally, he composed verses about heroism and war. His poetry is characterized by a fluid and simple language that dominates his work. The Persian theologian Jalal al-Din Davani lauded his compositions and it is likely that he was regarded as a successful poet during his life.
