= Eshaqvand dynasty =

13th century, Iran

Eshaqvand dynasty اسحاقوندان Esḥāqvandān
- c. mid-13th century–1592
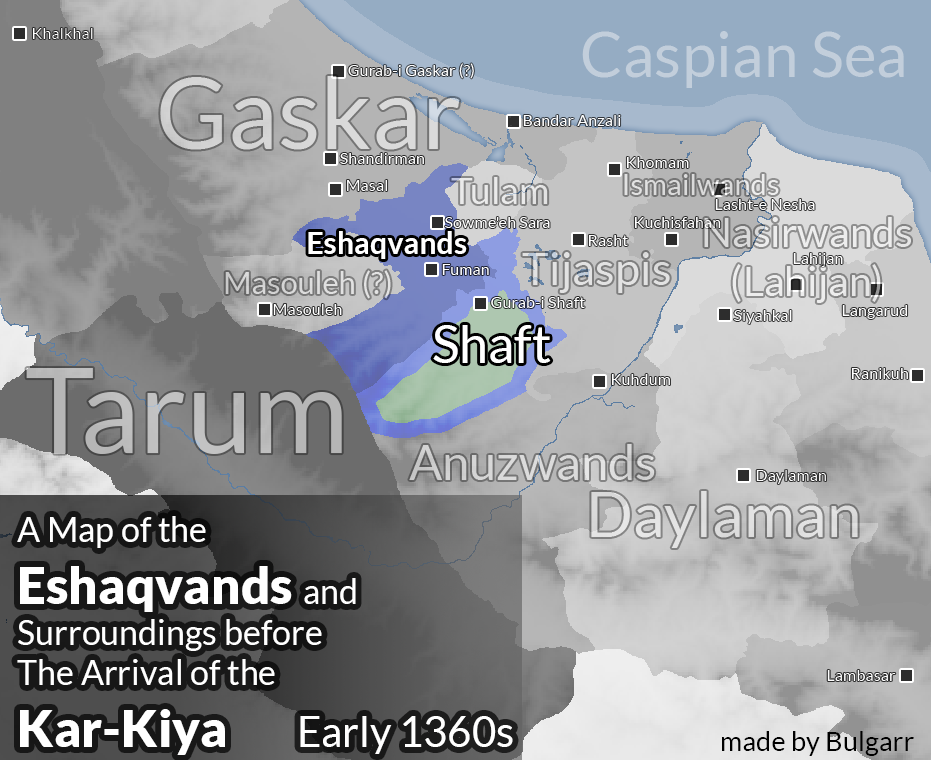
- Capital: Fuman
- Common languages: Gilaki
- Religion: Sunni Islam (pre-Safavid); Twelver Shia Islam (post-Safavid)
- History
  - Established: c. mid-13th century
  - Safavid conquest of Gilan: 1592
Succeeded by
Safavid Iran

The Eshaqvand dynasty (Persian: اسحاقوندان, romanized: Esḥāqvandān), also known as the Eshaqiyyeh (Persian: اسحاقیه), was a local dynasty ruling in Western Gilan (Bīa-pas), which is west of the Sefid-Rud River. The dynasty survived well into the Safavid era, when both it and its eastern counterpart, the Kar-Kiya, were removed. The Eshaqvand were Shafi'i Sunnis, who claimed descent from the Sasanians or from Isaac.

== Geographic reach ==
The Eshaqvands had their home in the district of Fuman. Said district was bounded on the north by Gaskar, the Murdab and Tulam; on the east by Shaft and the Pasi Khan River; (Note: A river that drains into the Anzali Wetlands.) on the south by Masouleh and Shaft's mountains; and by Masal on the west. Similar to its counterpart in Eastern Gilan, Lahijan, Fuman was generally viewed as the town which held the most sway in Bia-pas. The local rulers enjoyed a high income due to the silk trade, and the city, according to Mowstafi was large and the centre of a rich district producing abundant wheat, rice, and silk. It served as the capital of Bia-pas administratively until Jamshid Khan transferred the capital of the region to Rasht in 1572–73, when it surpassed Fuman in importance.

== Early Years and consolidation of Bīa-pas ==
In the period before the Kar-Kiya arrival, Gilan was divided among many different figures. The Eshaqvands, based in Fuman, were one of the many powers in Gilan. The district of Shaft was a dependency of Fuman. The Eshaqvands and the rulers of Gaskar to the north often fought.

Towards the arrival of the Kar-Kiya in 766 (1364–65), the domains of Amira Dubbaj, then ruler of Fuman, encompassed Masouleh, Fuman and Tulam. (Note: We have no information when exactly or how Tulam was incorporated into Fuman, but it was under a certain Rikabzan during Uljaitu's invasion of Gilan in 1306-7. See Rabino 1920, pp. 284-285) The Kar-Kiya, when they entered the scene, began enticing the Zaydi minority west of the Sefid-Rud to revolt, which created discontent between Sunni petty rulers and their population. This culminated in Lasht-e Nesha's case with the ousting of its local ruler, and its incorporation into the growing sayyid dynasty. The town had a primarily Zaydi population and would prove to later be a bone of contention between the Eshaqvands and Kar-Kiya. What followed was the collapse of the Isma'ilwand rulers of Kuchisfahan, and the Anuzwand rulers of Kuhdum, greatly threatening Fuman.

This threat would lead to the two's first confrontation in 1387 when both the Tijaspis and Eshaqvands chose to counter and attack the Kar-Kiya's interests in Kuhdum. In their rapid expansion, the Kar-Kiya had also acquired Tarom and Qazvin, which caught the deadly eye of Timur, who at the time was occupied combatting other adversaries. Thus, once he was able to turn his attention west, a heated letter exchange would eventually lead to the sayyids having to return to the territory that they had held for seven years. While this secured the Kar-Kiya from Timur's wrath, it emboldened the cornered dynasties of Bia-pas. When Kuhdum was invaded, many sayyids were either taken hostage or killed, much angering Sayyid 'Ali Kiya, who led his armies towards Rasht.

Amira Dubbaj would contribute to the crushing defeat of the Kar-Kiya in the following Battle of Rasht in August–September 1389, along with other rulers of Bia-pas. Sayyid 'Ali Kiya, the ambitious conqueror, was dead on the battlefield, his realm was left in disarray, and his dynasty was forced to retreat to Tonekabon for a time. Relations, however, would soon break down between the members of the successful coalition, and the Eshaqvands would clash with its neighbouring ruling dynasty of Rasht, the Tijaspis, around five or six months later. With the retreat of the Kar-Kiya, Amira Dubbaj realised that he had inadvertently inflated the power of Rasht, and so shifted his alliances and strategy, causing conflict. This would allow for Amira Dubbaj to invite the Kar-Kiya back into Gilan, to retake possession of Lahijan and Ranikuh, checking his eastern neighbour.

Additionally, Amira Dubbaj would quarrel with Amira Sasan, ruler of Gaskar, advancing to Gurab-i Gaskar, but was surprised and imprisoned, released on payment of 300 mans of silk and 100 kharwars of Iskandarani cotton goods.

Amira Dubbaj would support Sayyid Hadi Kiya in his bid for Lahijan, artificially rebalancing power in his favour across the river, but soon, Sayyid 'Ali Kiya's sons would rise up against their uncle, initiating a period of internal strife. The Eshaqvands involved themselves in the conflict, even supporting Sayyid Husayn Kiya in his bid for Lahijan. It would lead to an administrative restructure once the Kar-Kiya rebounded, where the children of Sayyid 'Ali Kiya would divide their land among themselves.

== Facing the Timurids, Qara Qoyunlu and Aq Qoyunlu ==
In 1403, Timur would send an expedition to Gilan, which he wished to subjugate. The rulers of Rasht and Lahijan came together to stop the expedition and negotiate, to prevent utter ruin from reaching Gilan. They agreed to pay a tribute of silk, horses, and cows to Timur and would continue doing so until the untimely death of the conqueror, in 1405.

Approximately in 1409–10, Amira Dubbaj would pass away, and his son, Ala'u'd-Din would succeed him. He was in turn succeeded by his son, also named Amira Dubbaj in 1433–34, whose son, also named Ala'u'd-Din, would perish in 1440–41, following interference in Bia-pish. Therefore, when Amira Dubbaj II followed his son in death, another Amira Ala'u'd-Din took power. Meanwhile, Rasht was undergoing a succession crisis between father and son, Falaku'd-Din and Amira Muhammad. Amira Ala'u'd-Din would seize power in Rasht on behalf of Amira Muhammad as his father left to undergo a pilgrimage to Makkah. Falaku'd-Din was forced to flee to Kuhdum upon his return but was compelled to surrender by the Eshaqvands, who handed him over to his son, who immediately hanged him. Instigated by Amira Ala'u'd-Din, during the reign of Nāṣer Kiya in Lahijan, various members of the Kar-Kiya family rose up against him, which he was only able to suppress with the assistance of the rivalling Tijaspi Amira Muhammad's help, allowing Nāṣer to expel his brother and shore up his sovereignty. For two years, a certain Husamu'd-Din, cousin of Amira Ala'u'd-Din, possessed power in place of Amira Ala'u'd-Din within Fuman, before he died in the mountains of Tarom. Meanwhile, Amira Ala'u'd-Din, who hid from the powerful Amira Muhammad Tijaspi of Rasht, retook power from Husamu'd-Din in May 1459 and put Amira Muhammad to death after he had fled to and returned from Shirvan (Note: By way of Khomam, he sailed to Shirvan.) in the wake of an invasion from across the Sefid-Rud. Amira Muhammad had left a boy named Tijasp in power but had returned following the boy's removal, and ended up in the custody of the Eshaqvands, who, with his death, would permanently take over Rasht in 1460.

=== Aq Qoyunlu in Gilan ===
With the ascendance of the Aq Qoyunlu ruler, Uzun Hasan, he imposed tribute upon Gilan, bringing the Caspian littoral under his grasp. Following this, he would tip the balance firmly in favour of the Kar-Kiya, giving them the power to make decisions in both East and West Gilan, under the condition that at least 40 kharvar or 60 mann (of Tabriz) of silk was secured as tribute from the West alone. The Aq Qoyunlu proved to have no interest in directly administering the region at the time, but with the death of Uzun Hasan and the ascension of Ya'qub, control over the Caspian littoral grew in importance. Ya'qub relied on silk revenues from the territory, but this also coincided with the period where control over and tribute from the region came seriously under threat, primarily from the Kar-Kiya who supervised the region in Uzun Hasan's reign. On several occasions, Ya'qub was forced to step in himself, such as when he intervened following the defeat of Kuhdum against the Kar-Kiya at Manjil in 1482. Following the ultimate weakening of the empire after the death of Ya'qub, relations between Gilanis and Aq Qoyunlu were permanently ruined when Ayebeh Soltan, sent by Rostam Beg, massacred and "made minarets out of the Gilanis’ heads," in Qazvini's words. Like many other occasions, the Eshaqvand and Kar-Kiya rivalry was also reflected in their support of different candidates in the bid for the Aq Qoyunlu imperial throne. The Eshaqvands backed Alvand Beg, while their adversaries supported Muhammadi.

By 1475–76, the Eshaqvands had eliminated the Tijaspis of Rasht. This happened after Falaku'd-Din had attempted to reinstate the Tijaspis, but had failed, dying in prison in 1475–76. Additionally, in 1476, when the ruler of Kuhdum refused to comply with Eshaqvand orders, he was met with military attack and carnage. In this year, Amira Ala'u'd-Din would pass away, bringing up the question of succession. His son Amira Dubbaj refused to take up his father's title, and so the people chose to tender their allegiance to another Amira Dubbaj b. Husamu'd-Din. However, this was short-lived, as with the assistance of Sultan Muhammad of Bia-pish, Amira Ishaq seized power in 1477–78. Amira Ishaq and Sultan Muhammad's successor, Mirza 'Ali, chose to make an effort to repair the relationship between the two dynasties, the latter giving his sisters' hand in marriage to the former in 1489. The ceremony brought with it the exchange of gifts and food and much celebration and reconciliation. The ruler of Shaft, Amira Sa'id Shafti, refused to submit to Fuman in 1477–78, and so Muhammad of Lahijan sent troops to expel and remove him on behalf of the Eshaqvands, and also as supreme governors of Gilan at the time. Also at this time, the former tyrannical ruler of Kuhdum, Amira Rustam, attempted to re-seize power, after the death of Uzun Hasan, but was jointly driven out by both rulers of Lahijan and Fuman. After a second attempt, this time with troops requested from Ya'qub in 1482, Kuhdum was divided between Fuman and Lahijan.

Relations however soon took a turn for the worse and soured upon Ya'qub Aq Qoyunlu's death in 1490. The sudden power vacuum encouraged both powers to seek territory outside of the mountainous capsule of Gilan, making conflict inevitable. Amira Ishaq was the first to take advantage of the opportunity, moving to Rahmatabad to prepare to advance on Tarom and Shamiran Fortress. This alarmed the Kar-Kiya, who quickly sent envoys, and secured Shamiran for themselves. Soon, in one of the few occasions where West and East Gilan would come together, some 40,000 men were summoned to counter a Mazandarani enemy in the Mar'ashi sayyid Mir Shams al-Din, before the commander sent by the Eshaqvands, 'Abbas, an adept politician, began sabotaging the coalition, foreseeing that Bia-pas may become the next victim of the Kar-Kiya. Thus, he brokered an agreement where Mazandaran was divided, Barforush Deh coming under Mir ‘Abdulkarim Mazandarani and Amol and Sari remaining in the hands of Mir Shams al-Din, serving Eshaqvand interests well.

== Under the Safavids ==
The would-be Isma'il I would arrive in Gilan in 1494, following the death of his brothers. He was first sent to the governor of Gaskar, before transferring himself to Rasht, then under the Eshaqvands. He stayed with Amira Ishaq, who supervised him, before ending his brief stay and moving to stay with the Kar-Kiya in Lahijan. Isma'il refused to stay long with Amira Ishaq, which his advisors had arranged for him to do, probably because he believed he could not trust a Sunnite, readily accepting the invitation to relocate to Lahijan. The advent of Isma'il in Gilan brought a new phase in the rivalry between the Eshaqvands and Kar-Kiya, so much so that for the first time since their formation, the Kar-Kiya resorted to fratricide, disregarding the respect for the family's sayyid status.

=== Resumption of Conflict in Gilan ===
Soon after Isma'il's departure in 1499, tension boiled over in Gilan, who chronicler Lahiji blamed the sepahsalar of Bia-pas, 'Abbas, for. 'Abbas undermined Kar-Kiyan influence in Mazandaran by suggesting a partition that favoured Eshaqvand interests, by aligning himself with Alvand Beg, intercepting Isma'il's convoy on its way to Ardabil, and joining Mir Shams al-Din to take over Parastak. A delicate peace was maintained for the longest time, but with the very sister given to Ishaq in despair, among other factors, war was left as the only solution. Therefore, in 1501, Mirza 'Ali Kiya led an army, joined by his allies, against the less advantaged Eshaqvands. This army, however, was met with great troubles and suffered catastrophic losses. Flooding also worked in the Eshaqvands' favour, and according to Lahiji, the attacking army lost 1,000 men in the floods of the Sefid-Rud alone. Reluctantly, the Kar-Kiya were forced to hand over Kuchisfahan, though they would still pursue its return. This loss would prove to have catastrophic consequences for Mirza 'Ali, proving to cost his life.

A few months following, Amira Ishaq would meet his end and was succeeded by his nephew, Amira Ala'u'd-Din. Kar-Kiya Muhammad, brother of Mirza 'Ali, and Mowlana Ahmad Tabib, his court doctor, were sent to negotiate the return of Kuchisfahan. 'Abbas, however, plotted to eliminate Ala'u'd-Din with the rulers of Shaft backing the conspiracy and replaced him with the late ruler's younger brother and 'Abbas' son-in-law, Amira Hesam al-Din. After Ala'u'd-Din was murdered, it became apparent that the matter of Kuchisfahan was no longer open to negotiation. Mirza 'Ali would also, in 1502–3, reinstate the hereditary rulers of Kuhdum, but this was temporary, as Kuhdum would surrender to Amira Ishaq soon after.

A following Kar-Kiya offensive was carried out, against the wishes of Mirza 'Ali's prized commander, Mir 'Abd al-Malek, which led to a battle at Gukeh, which cost Mir 'Abd al-Malek his life at the hands of 'Abbas. His head was then sent to Sultan Murad, implying that 'Abbas believed Murad to still be a serious contender as ruler of Persia.

The Kar-Kiya, would, however, be granted governorship over Gilan by Shah Isma'il when Khan Ahmad I Kar-Kiya was away to meet Isma'il personally at his court. In the eyes of the Safavids, they were now the legitimate and senior dynasty of the province. After Khan Ahmad I came into power, his vizier, Sadid Shafti, began negotiating with Hesam al-Din to plot the removal of Khan Ahmad in secret, in exchange for acknowledging Eshaqvand control over Bia-pas. Sadid Shafti would increase his influence and wrath, becoming a real existential threat for the new ruler, who became increasingly more vulnerable.

Around this time, in 1507, Shaykh Najm al-Din Rashti was appointed to the office of vakil and was placed in charge of mediating and guiding negotiations in Gilan on behalf of Isma'il. He sent a Kar-Kiya representative along with a delegate to Hesam al-Din, who imprisoned both delegates. Amira Hesam al-Din's hatred and contempt for the sayyids of Lahijan meant he refused to make peace, disregarding even Isma'il's direct orders. The Shah even had to call the rebels to order in 1505, and the royal army came to Gilan, but he relented after only being able to conquer Kuchisfahan before bad weather conditions deterred him from further action. It was subsequently arranged through Shaykh Najm al-Din Rashti that Kuchisfahan would be recognised as Eshaqvand, as the price of peace, which Khan Ahmad vehemently refused. The invading Eshaqvand army marched forth and occupied Lahijan for seven days, taking advantage of the now-bankrupted Kar-Kiya, who were brought to utter ruin. The city was looted, and jewellery was seized for the victors. Some 500 women and children were taken hostage and re-sold as slaves. The army would continue their advance to the Puli-Rud, and devastate Ranikuh and Rudsar on their way. This devastating loss forced Lahijan's hand to make peace and hand over Jeyhan and Rahmatabad to the victors.

To the dismay of Khan Ahmad I, Rashti has even granted Hesam al-Din the promise of Lasht-e Nesha and its surroundings in negotiations. Hesam al-Din was eager to enforce his claims but had to pay his dues to Rashti before considering any action. Khan Ahmad I was forced also to pay him to stave off his antagonism. Further upsetting Khan Ahmad, Rashti even proposed that certain Qizilbash emirs were invited into and granted territory in Gilan, which Khan Ahmad resolutely opposed. When Khan Ahmad obtained a decree directly from the Shah himself, legitimising his claim over Lasht-e Nesha, it was unrecognised by his counterpart in Fuman. Hesam al-Din instead attacked the town the following year and devastated it once more, wresting it from their control.

With the death of Rashti in 1509–10, Khan Ahmad I seized the opportunity and following an elaborate visit to the Shah in June 1510, bearing plenty of gifts, he was granted governorship over all the Velayat-e Dar al-Marz. (Note: i.e. from "Astara to Astarabad.")

After the devastating conflict earlier on, Hesam al-Din continued to cause trouble, but only locally in Gilan. In 1511–12, Hesam al-Din incurred the displeasure of the Shah, but sent his wife and child to his court to prevent escalation. This would repeat itself in 1514, and Shah Isma'il was even compelled to plan a military response, but the war with the Ottomans proved more pressing, so this was called off. The first contacts between Ottoman ruler Selim I, and an ambiguous "Governor of Gilan" would be established in 1517, said governor believed to have been referring to Hesam al-Din. This would mark the start of Eshaqvand correspondence with Konstantiniyye.

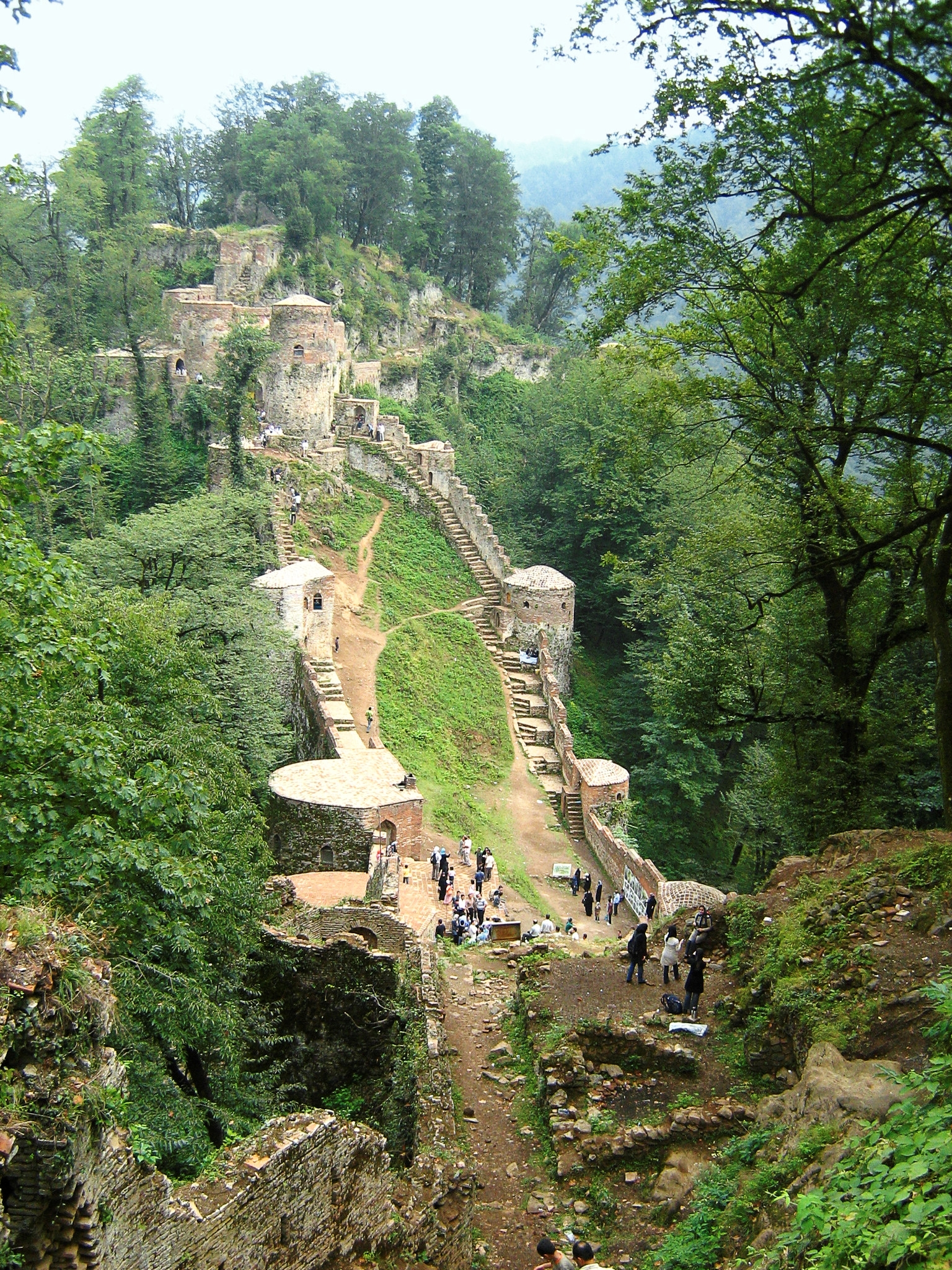
Rudkhan Castle, renovated in the reign of Amira Dubbaj.

In 1516, Hesam al-Din met his demise, succeeded by his son Amira Dubbaj, who followed in his father's steps, holding an immense disdain for the Safavids. He began provoking and defying Isma'il shortly after his rise to power, eventually leading to a military expedition directed at him in 1519. Troops were gathered from Mazandaran, Rustamdar and Eastern Gilan, and, knowing that he didn't stand a chance, desperately sent envoys to Isma'il's court in Sultaniyya, and begged for Khan Ahmad I to intervene on his behalf. He journeyed to the court to make his submission clear, was granted the title of Muzzafar Sultan, and the expedition was halted at the cost of 5000 tuman; a year later, Shah Isma'il decided to wed his daughter to Amira Dubbaj in 1520. Still, these appeasing measures did not sway Dubbaj, who established contacts with the Ottoman Sultan Sulayman the Magnificent after he had bet on the wrong horse in the Qizilbash Civil War early in Tahmasp's reign, which spread into Gilan. He supported the Ustajlu against the Takkalu, and exacerbated the situation by imprisoning Qazi Jahan, Tahmasp's vizier who was sent to negotiate peace between the two factions. His rebellious tendencies intensified, even establishing contact with 'Obeyd Khan Uzbek in a series of letters hoping to undermine Safavid authority, though these efforts especially escalated after the death of his wife later in 1532, severing his familial ties with the Safavids. His correspondence with Sulayman would prove to cost Dubbaj his life later on in Tahmasp I's reign.

==== Open Rebellion against Tahmasp I ====
During the Ottoman Invasion of Persia, Amira Dubbaj chose to support the sultan, Sulayman and joined him at Khoy with an army 8,000 strong in 1534. On his return, he found his entrance to Gilan barred by his former subordinate, Amira Hatim of Kuhdum, who briefly seized control over Dubbaj's lands. Amira Dubbaj fled to Shirvan, where he was seized by the Shah's officers. Amira Dubbaj was brought to Tabriz, where he was placed in a cage and burnt alive in 1535–36. Seizing the opportunity, a certain Sultan Muhammad of Kuhdum, who had succeeded Hatim, invaded and re-established his control over Rasht, which along with Bia-pas in general, was in anarchy.

=== Final Years and Dissolution ===
Bia-pas was then handed over to the infant Khan Ahmad Khan of Bia-pish in 1538, after Tahmasp attempted to send his brother, Bahram Mirza, to take care of Gilani affairs, but he was unable to fully and successfully establish his control and unite the two halves of Gilan. However, he did manage to expel the rulers of Kuhdum from Rasht, defeating them by the Siyah-Rudbar river in Rasht. The people disliked this arrangement and therefore, governance over the region was handed over to Amira Shahrukh, a relative of the Eshaqvand dynasty who was invited in 1543–4 to rule over Fuman. He ruled peacefully for seven years, before he was summoned to the Shah's court, and was unable to provide the customary presents expected of him from the officers of the court. He left without permission to Gilan, where he was captured, and brought to Tabriz where he would meet the same fate as his predecessor: that of being burnt at the stake.

The death of Amira Shahrukh would be followed by anarchy in Fuman, which Tahmasp ended when he appointed Sultan Mahmud b. Muzaffar Sultan (Amira Dubbaj) as ruler in 1558, and Khan Ahmad Khan as his regent and guardian. Khan Ahmad Khan, however, was able to engineer the new Eshaqvand ruler's imprisonment and death in Shiraz, where he was poisoned by his tutor, which would be followed by the unification of Gilan under the Kar-Kiya in the absence of a legitimate Eshaqvand contender. (Note: It was not directly under Khan Ahmad Khan, but under his son, Sultan Hasan. See Birjandifar 2019, p.145) However, he was mistrusted in the West, and Shah Tahmasp appointed Jamshid Khan b. Sultan Mahmud b. Amira Dubbaj, a 10-year-old, to rule over Western Gilan, and ordered Khan Ahmad Khan to return the territory, including that of Gaskar, which he had also seized in the meantime. All but Kuchisfahan was returned, which Khan Ahmad Khan claimed was rightfully his.

Khan Ahmad Khan was seized in 1567 by Safavid troops and was imprisoned, allowing Bia-pas to prosper in peace under Jamshid Khan, as Eastern Gilan was split and ruled by various emirs from the invading army. Jamshid Khan married a daughter of Tahmasp I in 1569–70 and transferred his capital to Rasht in 1572–73.

Khan Ahmad Khan was released in 1578, and with this, conflict returned to Gilan. He had not abandoned his ambitions to rule both parts of Gilan, the situation only worsening with a violent coup and the removal of Jamshid Khan in 1581. The weak shah, Mohammad Khodabanda, at the time gave Bia-pas to the leader of the coup, Mirza Kamran of Kuhdum. The shah soon regretted his decision, and sent some Ustajlu emirs in 1581, along with a respective army, to depose Mirza Kamran and reinstate the line of Jamshid Khan, now under his son, Muhammad Amin, who bid in turn with his brother Ibrahim Khan for their hereditary lands. (Note: Mirza Kamran had desired to rid himself of Jamshid Khan's sons, but many of his adherents rose up and defeated him at Rasht. He remained for a time until he was killed in Kuchisfahan and his skull was transformed into a drinking cup, by the orders of Khan Ahmad Khan. See: Rabino 1920, p.290) The latter was initially supported by Khan Ahmad Khan, but he switched his support to the former after some time and appointed Shah Malik Fumani as his guardian. Shah Malik Fumani brought eastern Bia-pas up to the Pasi Khan river under Muhammad Amin's control, but two years later in 1590–91, the guardian of Ibrahim Khan, Ali Beg Sultan, who was at Fuman, expelled Muhammad Amin from Khushkbijar, and compelled him to retire to Lasht-e Nesha. Khan Ahmad Khan then kidnapped Muhammad Amin at Rasht, taking him to Constantinople; he died en route of smallpox in Ganja. It seemed as if the vali of Gilan was to make common cause with the Ottomans, and so Shah 'Abbas, once he made peace with the Ottomans, marched to Gilan and removed Khan Ahmad Khan, directly incorporating Gilan into the Safavid realm, and putting an end to both Kar-Kiya and Eshaqvands formally. Gilan was thence made into khasseh land.

Governors of Gilan-e Bia-pas (Safavid Period, including Post-Eshaqvands)
Name	Year	Observations
Amira Hesam al-Din	1502–1510	Vali Gilan-e Bia-pas
Amira Dubbaj b. Amira Hesam al-Din (also known as Muzaffar Sultan)	1510–1537	Vali Rasht
Khan Ahmad Khan b. Sultan Hasan	1537–?	Vali Bia-pas and Bia-pish
Amira Shahrukh	1544–1550	Hakem Gilan-e Bia-pas
Khan Ahmad Khan	1551–1568	Vali Bia-pas and Bia-pish
Sultan Mahmud b. Muzaffar Sultan	1568	Hakem Gilan-e Bia-pas
Jamshid Khan b. Sultan Mahmud b. Amira Dubbaj	1568–1578	Hakem Gilan-e Bia-pas or Vali Rasht-e Gilan
Mirza Kamran (governor of Kuhdum)	1578–1581	Hakem Gilan-e Bia-pas (usurper)
Salman Khan	1582	Hakem Rasht
Mustafa Sultan Qajar	1592	Darugheh and Hakem Gilan-e Bia-pas
'Ali Beyg [Khan] Fumani	1593–1594	Hakem Gilan-e Bia-pas; Hakem Rasht+Fuman
Emir Shah Malik	1594	Darugheh in Rasht and Fuman
Farhad Khan Qaramanlu	1596	Hakem Gilan-e Bia-pas
Khosrow Beyg Chaharyar	1596	Darugheh Rasht - gholam
Khvajeh Muhammad Shafi' (also known as Mirza-ye 'Alamiyan	1604–1608	Vazir-e koll Gilan
Isma'il Beyg b. Aslan Beyg	1624–1629	Vizier Gilan-e Bia-pas (3 years as Vizier Fumani)
Mirza Taqi	1629–1634	Vazir-e koll
Aqa Zaman Isfahani	1635–?	Vizier Gilan-e Bia-pas+ Rasht
Lachin Aqa-ye Gholam Yusuf Aqa	?–1643–?	Vizier Bia-pas
Nizam al-Mulk	1649	Vizier Gilan
Murad Beyg [Khan]	1654–?	Teyuldar Gilan-e Bia-pas
Mirza Sadr al-Din Muhammad Jaberi	?–1660	Vizier Gilan-e Bia-pas
'Evaz Beyg	1660–1664	Vizier Gilan-e Bia-pas; gholam
Mirza Muhammad Karim b. Adam Sultan	1695	Vizier Gilan-e Bia-pas
Mirza Muhammad Husayn	1710?	Vizier Gilan
Kalb 'Ali Khan	Before 1712	Vizier Gilan

== Sources ==
- Rabino, H. L. (1918). "Rulers of Lahijan and Fuman, in Gilan, Persia". The Journal of the Royal Asiatic Society of Great Britain and Ireland: 85–100. ISSN 0035-869X.
- Madelung, Wilferd (December 15, 2001). "GĪLĀN iv. History in the Early Islamic Period". Encyclopaedia Iranica.
- Birjandifar, Nazak (2019). "Negotiating Power: Gilan and its gradual incorporation into the Safavid polity". Rula Abisaab (Supervisor). McGill University.
- Goto, Yukako (2017). "KĀR KIĀ". Encyclopædia Iranica (Online ed.).
- Bazin, Marcel (2000-12-15). "FŪMAN". Encyclopædia Iranica.
- Kasheff, Manouchehr (2001-12-15). "GĪLĀN v. History under the Safavids". Encyclopædia Iranica.
- Naṣīrī, ʻAlī Naqī; Floor, Willem M. (2008). Titles & emoluments in Safavid Iran: a third manual of Safavid administration. Washington, DC: Mage Publishers. ISBN 978-1-933823-23-2. OCLC 183928765.
- Rabino, H. L. (1920). "Rulers of Gilan: Rulers of Gaskar, Tul and Naw, Persian Talish, Tulam, Shaft, Rasht, Kuhdum, Kuchisfahan, Daylaman, Ranikuh, and Ashkawar, in Gilan, Persia". The Journal of the Royal Asiatic Society of Great Britain and Ireland (3): 277–296. ISSN 0035-869X.
- Floor, Willem M. (2001). Safavid government institutions. Costa Mesa, Calif: Mazda Publishers. ISBN 978-1-56859-135-3.
