= Campaigns of Ismail I =

Military exploits of the Persian monarch

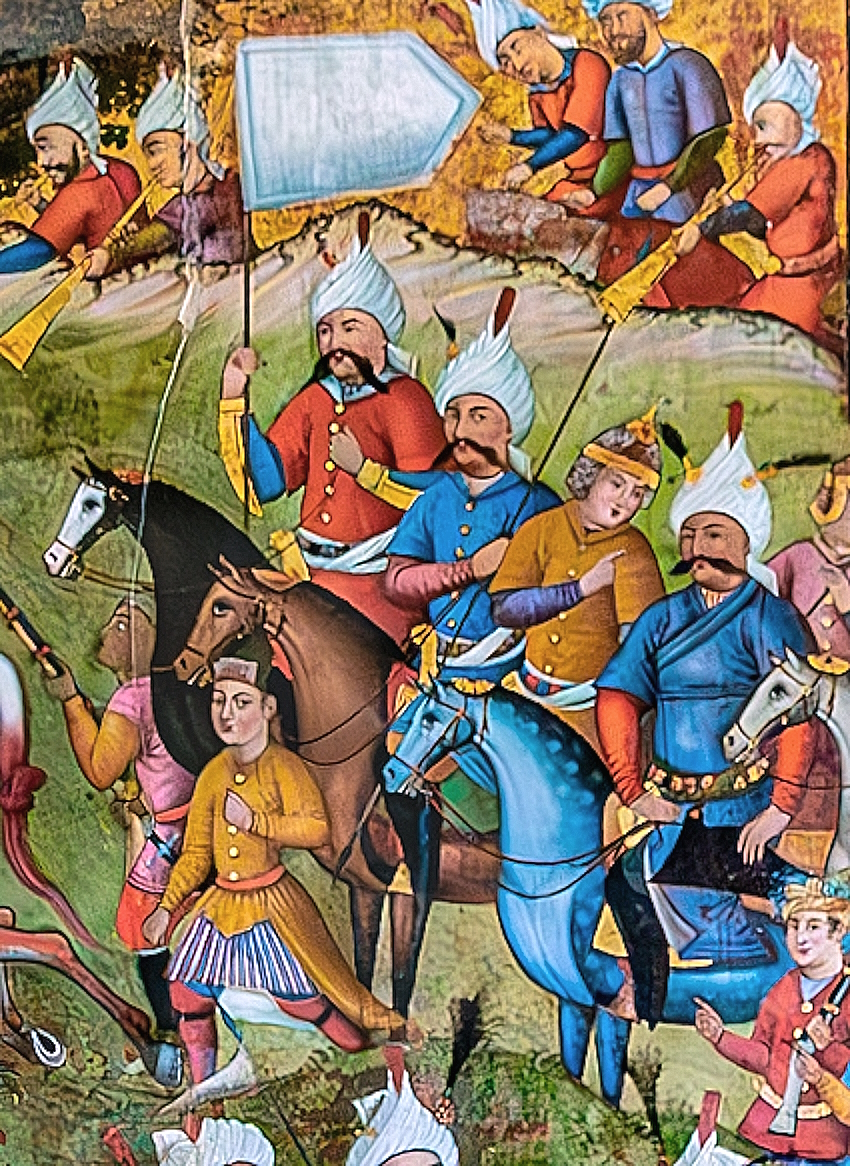
Qizilbash troops of Shah Ismail I. Circa 1647 painting, Chehel Sotoun

In the early sixteenth century, Persian conqueror Shah Ismail (1487 – 1524) embarked on a series of campaigns within the Greater Iran region that led to the establishment of the Safavid Empire. He was the first native Iranian monarch since late antiquity to achieve dominion over the entirety of Iran (and beyond it). This article provides an overview of Ismail's wars.

In the initial seven years of Ismail’s reign, the Qizilbash dominated almost entirely, holding key governmental and military posts. Yet, upon reaching maturity, Ismail began appointing certain roles to native Persian-speaking individuals, referred to then as "Tajiks." This move aimed to counterbalance the Qizilbash’s authority and limit their control.

== Shah Ismail's Campaigns ==
Hailing from the city of Ardabil in the northwest of the country, Ismail was the head of the mystical Safavid order of Sufi Muslims. At only thirteen years of age, he commenced his exploits by conquering the state of Shirvan in 1500 – 1501. Immediately after this he began demolishing the Aq Qoyunlu confederation of Turkomans, which ruled western Iran at the time. It was the Aq Qoyunlu who, alarmed at the fall of Shirvan, set out halt the progress of this new conqueror. The two armies met at the Battle of Sharur on 17 July 1501. Ismail's army triumphed despite being outnumbered by four to one.

When he took Tabriz in 1501, he proclaimed himself Shahanshah (King of Kings) of Iran and the Safavid state came into existence. Ismail established the Shia denomination of Islam as the official religion of Iran and began mass conversions of the formerly predominant Sunni Muslims, spreading the compulsory Shia faith by the sword and slaying those who did not convert. He also announced himself to be the Mahdi and the reincarnation of Ali and Husayn, while simultaneously claiming to be the personification of the divine light called khvarenah or khvarenah which had existed in the ancient Iranian shahs Darius the Great, Shapur I and Khosrow Anushirvan, and wielding a supernatural aura of invincibility.

The Safavid conquest of the Aq Qoyunlu was mostly complete by 1503 – with Fars and Persian Iraq falling to Ismail in that year – but the Shah continued pursuing its remnants for another five years, conquering Mesopotamia and taking Baghdad in 1508. There he destroyed the tombs of several important Sunni figures including those of the Abbasid caliphs. In 1510, having turned east, the shah triumphed once again at the dénouement of the Perso-Uzbek Wars, the Battle of Merv, which confirmed his hold over Khorasan.

Having thus unified Iran, Ismail had established the country as a great power for the first time in several centuries. Naturally his next war was with the other power of the region, the Ottoman Empire. The two states faced off at the Battle of Chaldiran in 1514. Ismail had all but won the battle against sultan Selim when the Ottoman artillery came to the enemy's rescue. Thus, at the last moment, the battle was lost.

== List of campaigns and battles ==
Date	Conflict	Opponents	Outcome	Notes
1500	Battle of Gulistan (or Cabanı)	Shirvan	Victory	Part of the Safavid conquest of Shirvan (1500 – 1501)
1501	Siege of Baku	Shirvan	Victory	Part of the Safavid conquest of Shirvan (1500 – 1501)
1501	Battle of Sharur	Aq Qoyunlu	Victory	Part of the Safavid conquest of the Aq Qoyunlu confederation (1501 – 1503/08)
1501	Siege of Tabriz	Aq Qoyunlu	Victory	Part of the Safavid conquest of the Aq Qoyunlu Ismail, at fourteen years of age, makes Tabriz his capital and declares himself "Shahanshah" (King of Kings) of Iran.
1502	Capture of Erzincan and Erzurum	Aq Qoyunlu	Victory	Part of the Safavid conquest of the Aq Qoyunlu
1502	Conquest of Armenia	Aq Qoyunlu	Victory	Part of the Safavid conquest of the Aq Qoyunlu
1502	Turkoman invasions of Georgia	Aq Qoyunlu	Victory	The Safavids aided Georgia against the Turkic invaders of that country.
1502 – 1510	Perso-Uzbek War	Shaybanid Dynasty Kazakh Khanate	Victory	Safavids supported by Timurid Herat and Timurid Kabul (the latter led by Babur)
1503	Conquest of Fars	Aq Qoyunlu	Victory	Part of the Safavid conquest of the Aq Qoyunlu
1503	Conquest of Persian Iraq	Aq Qoyunlu	Victory	Part of the Safavid conquest of the Aq Qoyunlu
1503	Battle of Hamadan	Aq Qoyunlu	Victory	Part of the Safavid conquest of the Aq Qoyunlu
1503	Capture of Kerman	Aq Qoyunlu	Victory	Part of the Safavid conquest of the Aq Qoyunlu
1503	Capture of Nakhchivan	Aq Qoyunlu	Victory	Part of the Safavid conquest of the Aq Qoyunlu
1504	Conquest of Mazanderan	Afrasiyab Dynasty	Victory	Destruction of the Afrasiyab Dynasty of Mazanderan
1504	Conquest of Yazd	Aq Qoyunlu	Victory	Part of the Safavid conquest of the Aq Qoyunlu
1506 – 1510	Mokri uprising	Mokri rebels	Victory	Kurdish rebellion suppressed
1507 – 1508	Conquest of Diyarbakir	Aq Qoyunlu	Victory	Part of the Safavid conquest of the Aq Qoyunlu The Safavid power is extended into eastern Anatolia
1508	Battle of Baghdad (1508)	Aq Qoyunlu	Victory	Sultan Murad flees Baghdad causing the collapse of the Aq Qoyunlu, Shah Ismail rules over all of Iraq and destroys the graves of Al Gilani and Abu Hanifa.
1510	Battle of Merv	Khanate of Bukhara	Victory	Conclusion of the Perso-Uzbek War and the Safavid conquest of Khorasan
1514	Battle of Chaldiran	Ottoman Empire	Defeat	Campaign against Turkish sultan Selim the Grim
1522	Battle of Teleti	Kingdom of Georgia	Victory	Part of Ismail's Georgian Campaign of 1516 – 1522

== Sources ==
- Fisher, William Bayne; Avery, P.; Hambly, G.R.G.; Melville, C. (1986). The Cambridge History of Iran. Vol. 6. Cambridge: Cambridge University Press. ISBN 978-0521200943.
- Roy, Kaushik (2014). Military Transition in Early Modern Asia, 1400–1750: Cavalry, Guns, Government and Ships. Bloomsbury Publishing. ISBN 978-1780938004.
- Sicker, Martin (2000). The Islamic World in Ascendancy: From the Arab Conquests to the Siege of Vienna. Greenwood Publishing Group. ISBN 978-0275968922.

== See also ==
- Safavid Iran
- Qizilbash
- Husayn Beg Shamlu
- Aq Qoyunlu
- List of wars involving Iran
- Safavid conversion of Iran to Shia Islam
- List of monarchs of Iran
- List of Mahdi claimants
