= List of rulers of Aq Qoyunlu =

The Bayandurids or the Tur-'Alids ruled over the Aq Qoyunlu confederation, that was founded by Tur Ali bin Pehlwan (1340-1360 C.E.), and was followed by his son Qutlugh bin Tur Ali (1360-1378/79 C.E.) and his grandson Uthman Beg respectively, the founder of Aq Qoyunlu state. The dynasty originated around Diyarbakır and ruled the territory now part of present-day Turkey, Iraq and Iran. Their capital was the city of Tabriz after 1471–1472. They gained international significance under Uzun Hasan who became their greatest leader. He conquered the Qara Qoyunlu and defeated the Timurid Empire, thus adding significant portions of Iran to his kingdom. He eventually lost to the Ottoman Empire, weakening his kingdom. The kingdom was eventually absorbed into Safavid Iran.

Tamga of Bayandur used by the Aq Qoyunlu

== Aq Qoyunlu rulers ==
- In letters from the Ottoman Sultans, when addressing the kings of Aq Qoyunlu, such titles as Arabic: ملك الملوك الأيرانية "Iranian King of Kings", Arabic: سلطان السلاطين الإيرانية "Iranian Sultan of Sultans", Persian: شاهنشاه ایران خدیو عجم Shåhanshåh Irån Khadiv Ajam "Shahanshah of Iran and Ruler of Persia", Jamshid shawkat va Fereydun råyat va Dårå deråyat "Powerful like Jamshid, flag of Fereydun and wise like Darius" have been used. Uzun Hassan also held the title Padishah-i Iran "Padishah of Iran", which was re-adopted again in the Safavid times through his grandson Ismail I, the founder of the Safavid dynasty.

Titular Name	Personal Name	Reign
Bey بیگ	Pehlavan bey Bayandur	? – 1340 C.E.
Bey بیگ	Bey Tur-Ali طور علی پہلوان	1340–1360 C.E.
Bey بیگ; Fakhr-al-Din فخر الدین	Qutlugh bin Tur Ali قتلغ بن طور علی	1360–1378/79 C.E.
Bey بیگ	Ahmed bin Qutlugh احمد بن قتلغ; Nominally Under Qara Yoluq Osman from 1396 – 1403 C.E.	1389–1403 C.E.
Bey بیگ; Baha-al-Din بھا الدین	Uthman Beg قرا یولک عثمان	1403–1435 C.E.
Bey بیگ; Jalal-al-Din جلال الدین	Ali Beg علی بن قرا یولک عثمان	1435–1438 C.E.
Bey بیگ; Nur-al-Din نور الدین	Hamza Beg حمزہ بن قرا یولک عثمان	1438–1444 C.E.
Bey بیگ; Mu'izz-al-Din معز الدین	Jahangir جهانگیر بن علی	1444–1451/52 C.E.
Bey بیگ	Qilich Arslan bin Ahmed قلچ ارسلان بن احمد	1451/52 – 1457
Bey بیگ; Abul-Nasr ابو النصر	Uzun Hasan اوزون حسن بن علی	1457–1478 C.E.
Bey بیگ; Abul-Fath ابو الفتح	Sultan Khalil سلطان خلیل بن اوزون حسن	1478 C.E.
Bey بیگ; Abul-Muzaffar ابو المظفر	Yaqub bin Uzun Hasan یعقوب بن اوزون حسن	1478–1490 C.E.
Bey بیگ; Abul-Fath ابو الفتح	Baysunqur بایسنقر بن یعقوب	1490–1491 C.E.
Bey بیگ; Abul-Muzaffar ابو المظفر	Rustam Beg رستم بن مقصود بن اوزون حسن	1493–1497 C.E.
Bey بیگ; Abul-Nasr ابو النصر	Ahmad Beg احمد گوده بن اغورلو محمد بن اوزون حسن	1497 C.E.
Division of Aq Qoyunlu Beylik.

- Yellow Shaded rows signify Progenitors of Aq Qoyunlu dynasty.
  - Blue Shaded row signifies Nominal rule.

Diyarbakır	Azerbaijan	Iraq	Isfahan, Fars & Kerman
Bey بیگ; Qasem Beg; 1498 – 1499 C.E.	Bey بیگ; Abul-Muzaffar ابو المظفر; Alwand bin Yusuf bin Uzun Hasan الوند بن یوسف بن اوزون حسن; 1497 – 1502 C.E.		Bey بیگ; Abul-Mukarram ابو المکرم; Muhammad bin Yusuf bin Uzun Hasan محمد بن یوسف بن اوزون حسن; 1497 – 1500 C.E.
Bey بیگ; Zayn-al-Aibidin bin Ahmed bin Ughurlu Muhammad زین العابدین بن احمد بن اغورلو محمد; 1504 – 1514 C.E.	Shāh Ismāʿil شاہ اسماعیل; After invading Shirvan and taking Baku, Shah Ismail I besieged the fort at Gulistan when news arrived that Alwand bin Yusuf bin Uzun Hasan had reached Nakhchivan with an army. Ismail broke off the siege and went rapidly to combat the Aq Qoyunlu. He sent his commander Piri Beg who defeated the Aq Qoyunlu commander Amir Uthman at the Battle of Shurur near Nakhchivan thus leaving the Aq Qoyunlu to rapidly collapse as a kingdom. 1502 C.E.		Bey بیگ; Abul-Muzaffar ابو المظفر; Sultan Murad bin Yaqub bin Uzun Hasan سلطان مراد بن یعقوب بن اوزون حسن; 1500 – 1514 C.E.
Dissolution of Aq Qoyunlu in 1514. Absorbed into the Safavid Empire of Iran.

== Genealogy of Aq Qoyunlu ==
House of Bayandur

Aq Qoyunlu

Qutluq r. 1378–1389
Ahmad I r. 1389–1403	Uthman r. 1403–1435
Qilich-Arslan r. 1453–1457	Ali r. 1435–1438	Hamza r. 1438–1444
Jahangir r. 1444–1453	Hasan r. 1457–1478
Qasim r. 1497–1501	Muhammad	Khalil r. 1478–1478	Ya'qub r. 1478–1490	Maqsud	Yusuf
Ahmad II r. 1497–1497	Baysunghur r. 1490–1492	Murad r. 1500–1508	Rustam r. 1492–1497	Alwand r. 1497–1504	Muhammad r. 1497–1500
Zayn al-Abidin r. 1504–1508
