= Abdi Beg Shamlu =

Qizilbash commander (died 1506)

Tavajibashi Abdi Beg Shamlu
- عبدی ‌بیگ شاملو
- Died: 1506
- Spouse: An sister of Ismail I
- Children: Durmish Khan Shamlu; Hoseyn Khan Shamlu
- Military career
- Allegiance: Safavid order (1500–1501); Safavid Iran (1501–1506)
- Branch: Safavid Army
- Service years: 1500–1506
- Conflicts: Campaigns of Ismail I; Battle of Sharur; Battle of Hamadan (1503); Kurdish uprising (1506-1510) †

Abdi Beg Shamlu (Persian: عبدی ‌بیگ شاملو; d. 1506) was an Safavid era military officer and politician from Shamlu tribe, who served as Tavajibashi.

== Military career ==
Abdi Beg Shamlu joined to Safavid movement in 1500, with his 300 warriors, he was among the 7,000 Qizilbash followers of Ismail I. After accession of Ismail I, Abdi Beg received the title Tavajibashi. Abdi Beg subsequently participated in Campaigns of Ismail I. In 1501, he took part in Battle of Sharur. At the Battle of Hamadan (1503), Abdi Beg, together with Abdal Beg Talish, Hossein Beg Laleh Shamlu, Mohammad Khan Ustajlu, Bayram Beg Karamanlu, Yakan Beg Tekelu and Sari Ali Beg Tekelu, commanded the right and left wings of Qizilbash army. On 11 April 1504, Ismail I marched against fortress of Usta. Kiya Husayn II, who opposed Shah, led a large detachment out of stronghold to lay an ambush. Shah Ismail ordered Abdi Beg Shamlu and Bayram Beg Karamanlu to assault fortress from one gate while he commanded the attack from another. Caught off guard by ambush, Abdi Beg Shamlu and Bayram Beg Karamanlu fought bravely but were unable to reach fortress. In mid-1504, Rais Ghaybi the governor of Abarkuh was rebelled and Ismail I ordered Abdi Khan to suppress the revolt, the mission was ended successfully. In mid-1506, a punitive expedition led by Bayram Beg Karamanlu, Khadim Beg Khalifa, Abdi Beg Shamlu, and Sari Ali Beg Tekelu raided the encampment of Shir Sarim, a leader of Kurdish rebels. Abdi Beg Shamlu and Sari Ali Beg Tekelu were killed in the heavy fighting, while Shir Sarim managed to escape. During the winter of 1506–1507, the captured rebels were brought before Shah Ismail at Khoy and brutally executed—including Shir Sarim's son and brother—in retaliation for the deaths of the Qizilbash commanders.

== Marriage and children ==
Abdi Beg Shamlu married with an sister of Ismail I, and had 2 children; Durmish Khan Shamlu and Hoseyn Khan Shamlu.

== Sources ==
- Sarwar, Ghulam (1939). History of Shah Isma’il Safawi. Aligarh: Muslim University.
- Youssef-Jamali, Mohammad Karim (1981). Life and personality of S̲hāh Ismāʻīl (1487-1524). Edinburgh: University of Edinburgh.
- Savory, Roger (1980). Iran under the Safavids. New York: Cambridge University Press. ISBN 9780521224833.
- Minorsky, Vladimir (1943). Tadhkirat al-Mulūk, A Manual of Safavid Administration. London: Luzac & Co.
- Mitchell, Colin Paul (2002). The Sword and the Pen [microform] : Diplomacy in Early Safavid Iran, 1501-1555. Toronto: University of Toronto. ISBN 9780612691674.
- Munshi, Iskandar Beg (1978). History of Shah 'Abbas the Great (Tārīkh-e ‘Ālamārā-ye ‘Abbāsī). Translated by Savory, Roger. Boulder, Colorado: Westview Press.
- Browne, Edward Granville (1924). A Literary History of Persia. Vol. 4. The University Press.
- Savory, Roger (December 15, 2004). "ḤOSAYN KHAN ŠĀMLU". In Yarshater, Ehsan (ed.). Encyclopædia Iranica (Online ed.). Encyclopædia Iranica Foundation.
