= Safavid conquest of Shirvan =

Safavid military campaign

- Part of Campaigns of Ismail I
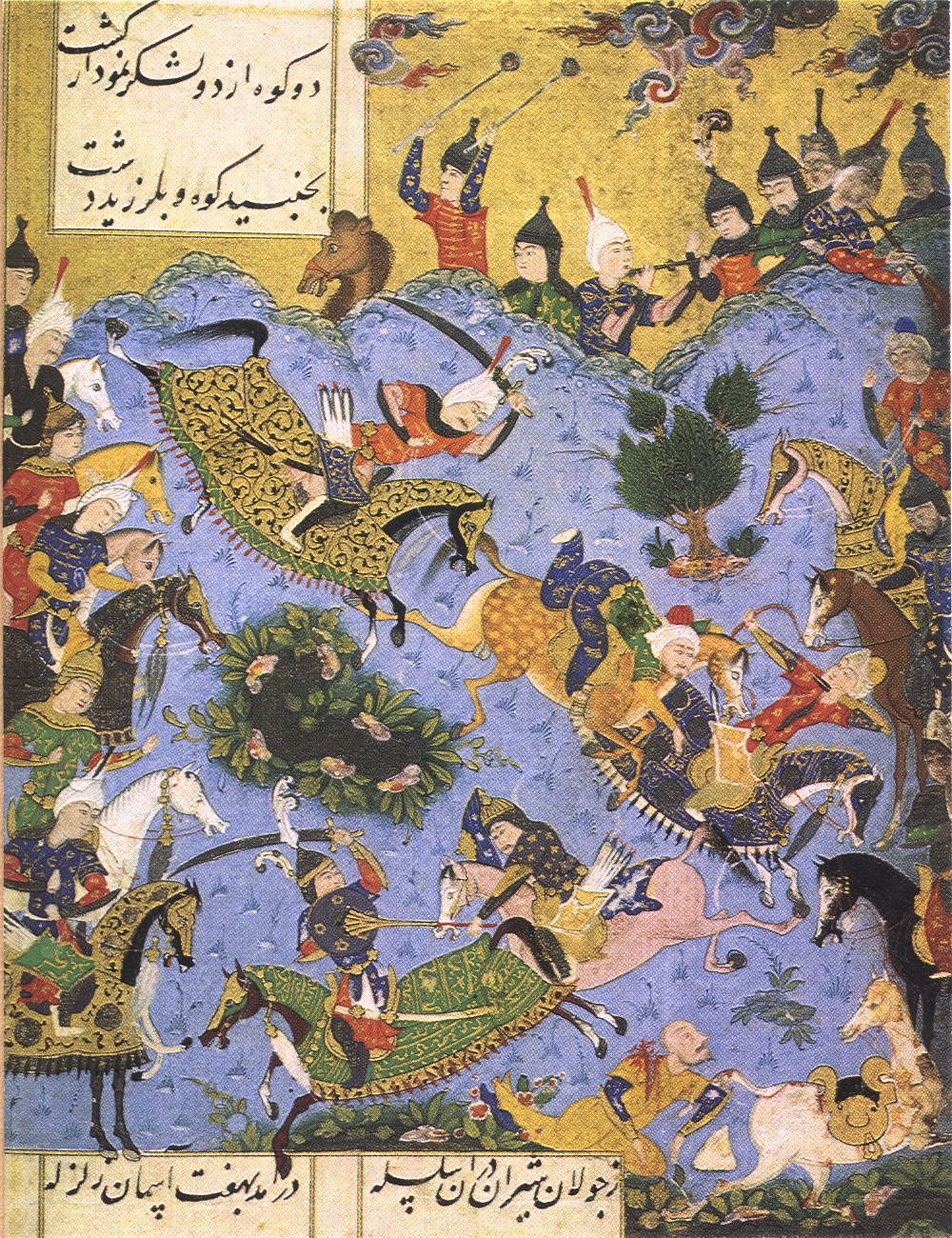
- The battle between the young Ismail and Shah Farrukh Yassar of Shirvan. Shāhnāmah Shāh Ismaʿīl (Tabriz, 1541)
Date	December 1500 – 1501
Location	Shirvan (present-day Azerbaijan Republic and southern Dagestan)
Result	Safavid victory: Establishment of the Safavid Empire

Belligerents
Safavid order	Shirvanshahs

Commanders and leaders
Ismail I Hossein Beg Laleh Shamlu; Mohammad Beg Ustajlu	Farrukh Yassar †; Bahram Beg X Ghazi Beg (surrendered)

Strength
7,000 Qizilbash	27,000

Casualties and losses
Unknown	Entire army

The conquest of Shirvan was the first campaign of Ismail, the leader of the Safavid order. In late 1500, Ismail marched into Shirvan, and, despite heavily outnumbered, decisively defeated the then incumbent Shirvanshah Farrukh Yassar in a pitched battle, in which the latter and his entire army were killed. The conquest resulted in the toppling of the Shirvanshahs as autonomous rulers, who had ruled large parts of the Caucasus for centuries, and the incorporation of their domain.

== Background and war ==
Ismail's father Shaykh Haydar and his grandfather Shaykh Junayd had both been killed in battle by the rulers of Shirvan, in 1488 and 1460, respectively. In the summer of 1500, Ismail rallied a force of 7,000 Qizilbash fighters at Erzincan consisting of the Ustajlu, Shamlu, Rumlu, Tekelu, Dulkadir, Afshar, Qajar and Varsak tribes. Shortly before initiating his offensive, seeing the weakness of the fragmented Georgian kingdoms, he looted Samtskhe. At the same time, he induced the Georgian kings Constantine II and Alexander I, of respectively Kartli and Kakheti, to attack the Ottoman possessions near Tabriz, on the promise that he would cancel the tribute that Constantine was forced to pay to the Aq Qoyunlu once Tabriz was captured. In December 1500, with the intention to avenge his murdered ancestors, Ismail crossed the Kura River into Shirvan with his 7,000-strong force, and decisively defeated and killed Farrukh Yassar, the then incumbent king of Shirvan and his entire 27,000-strong army in a pitched battle at Jabani, near the Shirvanshah capital of Shamakhi, or at Gulistan (present-day Gülüstan, Goranboy, Nagorno-Karabakh). He subsequently marched on to reach the Caspian coast and took Baku.

== Aftermath ==
By this victory, Ismail had toppled the Shirvanshahs, and successfully expanded his domains. After the conquest, Ismail had Alexander I of Kakheti send his son Demetre to Shirvan to negotiate a peace agreement. Ismail allowed the Shirvanshah family to remain in power in Shirvan for some more years, under Safavid suzerainty. In 1538, during the reign of Ismail's successor and son, Tahmasp I (r. 1524-1576), the Safavids completely removed the Shirvanshahs from power, and turned Shirvan into a fully functioning province governed by appointed officials.

Ismail's victory alarmed the ruler of the Aq Qoyunlu, Alvand, who subsequently proceeded north from Tabriz, and crossed the Aras River in order to challenge the Safavid forces; a pitched battle was fought at Sharur in which Ismail's army came out victorious despite being outnumbered by four to one. After eventually conquering Tabriz and Nakhchivan, Ismail broke the promise he had made to Constantine, making the kingdoms of Kartli and Kakheti his vassals. In Tabriz, he was crowned king (shah), marking the beginning of the Safavid dynasty's rule.

== See also ==
- Siege of Tabriz (1501)

== Sources ==
- Fisher, William Bayne; Avery, P.; Hambly, G. R. G; Melville, C. (1986). The Cambridge History of Iran. Vol. 6. Cambridge: Cambridge University Press. ISBN 978-0521200943.
- Rayfield, Donald (2012). Edge of Empires: A History of Georgia. Reaktion Books. ISBN 978-1780230702.
- Roy, Kaushik (2014). Military Transition in Early Modern Asia, 1400-1750: Cavalry, Guns, Government and Ships. Bloomsbury Publishing. ISBN 978-1780938004.
- Savory, Roger M.; Karamustafa, Ahmet T. (1998). "ESMĀʿĪL I ṢAFAWĪ". Encyclopaedia Iranica, Vol. VIII, Fasc. 6. pp. 628–636.
- Sicker, Martin (2000). The Islamic World in Ascendancy: From the Arab Conquests to the Siege of Vienna. Greenwood Publishing Group. ISBN 978-0275968922.
