= Ahmad Beg =

Sultan of the Aq Qoyunlu in 1497

Ahmad Göde
- Beg
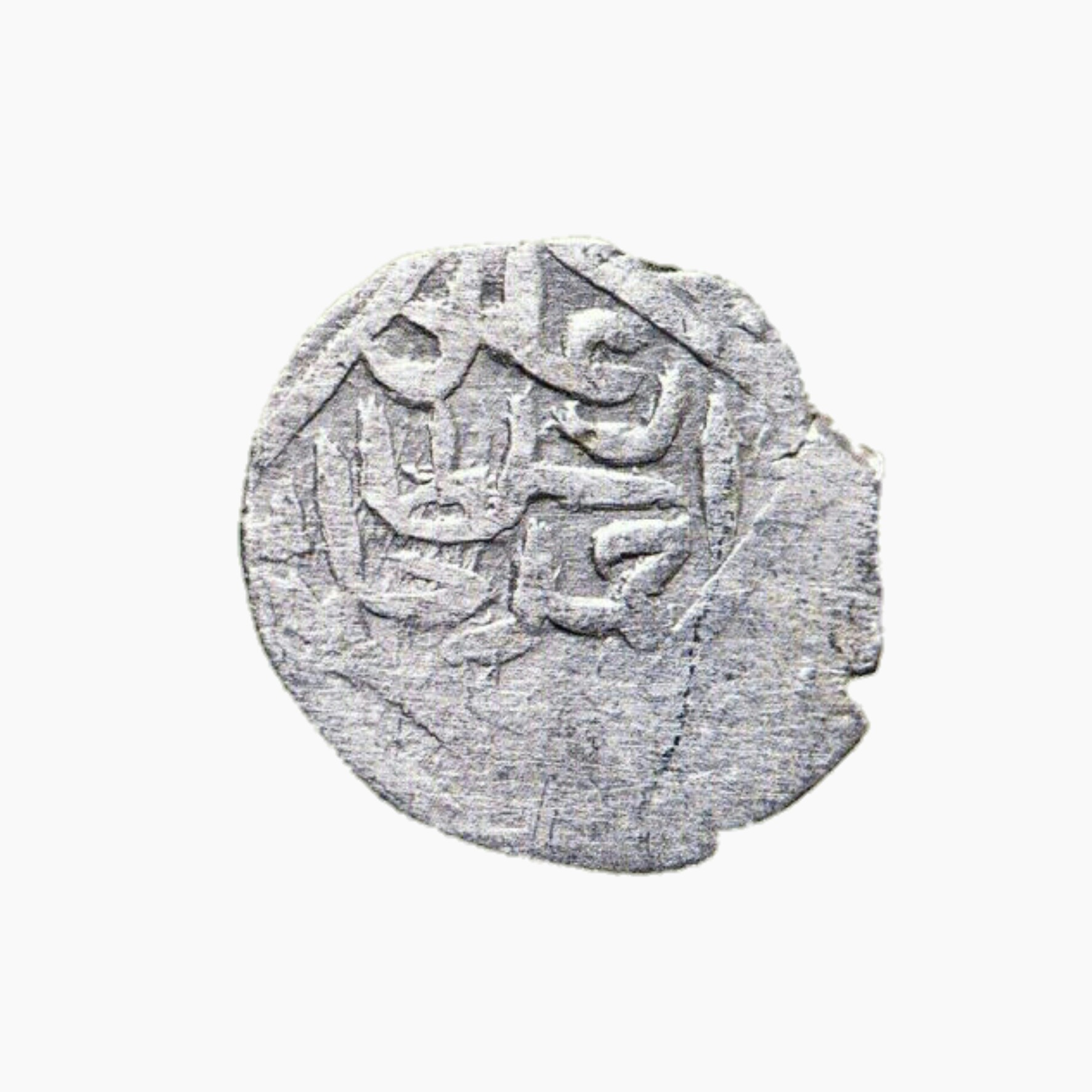
- Ahmad's coin minted in Tabriz, 1497 AD.

Sultan of the Aq Qoyunlu
- Reign: May 1497 – December 1497
- Coronation: Tabriz, May 1497
- Predecessor: Rustam Beg
- Successor: Alwand Beg (in the west); Qasem Beg (in Diyarbakır); Muhammad Beg (in Persian Iraq and Fars)
- Born: 1476; Constantinople or Sivas, Ottoman Empire
- Died: 14 December 1497 (aged 20–21); Isfahan, Aq Qoyunlu
- Spouse: Aynışah Sultan (m. 1490)
- Issue: Neslihan Hanımsultan; Hanzade Hanımsultan; Sultanzade Zeyneddin Bey
Names
- Aḥmad b. Oḡurlū Moḥammad
- Dynasty: Aq Qoyunlu
- Father: Ughurlu Muhammad
- Mother: Gevherhan Hatun
- Religion: Sunni Islam

Ahmad Beg or Ahmed Beg (1476 – 14 December 1497) was a ruler of the Aq Qoyunlu. Through his father Ughurlu Muhammad he was a paternal grandson of Uzun Hasan, while through his mother Gevherhan Hatun he was a maternal grandson of Mehmed the Conqueror. He was also a son-in-law (damat) to Bayezid II.

== Name ==
He is known as Ahmad Göde or Gövde Ahmad (Azerbaijani: گودک احمد; Persian: احمد گوده).

According to Turkish sources, he got the nickname göde due to his short height.

According to the Safavid historian Hasan Beg Rumlu:

Indeed, as mentioned earlier, he was killed in the winter of that year. His reign lasted six months. As for his physique; his face was extremely red and white, he was short, and his hands and feet were short. For this reason, Ahmad was known as göde.

He is mentioned in contemporary sources as Ahmed Mirza, Ahmed Padishah or Sultan Ahmed.

== Early life ==
In 1474, before Ahmad's birth, his father Ughurlu Muhammad rebelled against Ahmad's grandfather, the then ruling sultan Uzun Hasan, and took refuge in the Ottoman Empire. Mehmed the Conqueror welcomed Ughurlu and married him to his daughter Gevherhan Hatun. Ahmad was born from this marriage, but hardly knew his father since Ughurlu Muhammad was killed in 1477. He was raised in the Ottoman court where he received the care and attention befitting a claimant to the Aq Qoyunlu throne and a nephew of Bayezid. Indeed, Bayezid felt a strong familial bond with the young prince as he frequently addressed him as his dear son in official correspondence and offered his daughter Aynışah Sultan in marriage for him.

The arrival of the embassy of military commanders and urban notables sent from Diyarbakir by Nur Ali assured Ahmad a broad coalition of support would welcome his return.

Ahmad left Constantinople shortly afterwards and met Nur Ali and an army of supporters at Erzincan before Rustam's defeat in the summer of 1497.

== Reign ==
In 1497 he overthrew his cousin Rustam Beg, after returning from exile in Ottoman territory. A month or two later, Rustam attempted to regain his throne with the help of the Qajars in the Ganja region, which cost him his life. During his reign, he made serious reforms, and even had some great begs executed. Meanwhile, Ayba Sultan in Kerman made an agreement with the governor of Fars, Purnek Qasim Beg and declared Sultan Ya'qub's son Murad Beg the ruler. However, shortly afterwards, Murad was imprisoned in Rûyindiz castle and Ayba Sultan recognized the rule of Alwand Beg.

On 14 December 1497, Ahmad was defeated and killed near Isfahan. After his death, the Aq Qoyunlu empire underwent further disintegration. None of the tribal factions could secure more than provincial recognition of its favored throne-claimant, with the result that three sultans reigned concurrently.

During his rule, he tried to impose the Ottoman administrative, political and religious system to the Aq Qoyunlu state. He wanted to strengthen the central state's dominance, which was weakened by the efforts of the nomadic emirs to get away from the central administration. This centralization of state dominance contributed to the significant successes achieved in the Ottoman Empire at that time. However, this policy of Ahmed Beg did not win him the support of the Aq Qoyunlu emirs. The emirs owned vast lands and they did not want to lose them. With the tax reform, he abolished nearly twenty types of taxes that were not included in Islamic law. These reforms were not continued after his death and old rules were put into practice again.

== Personal life ==
A copy of the Shahnama (located in Topkapı Palace) dated 1495–1496 AD "was completed for him at Herat". This luxuriously produced illustrated manuscript, with a lacquer painted binding, carries an inscription saying that it was produced for the library of Sultan Ahmad. The fact that its illustrations are in the Aq Qoyunlu style encourages the thought that Ahmad Beg may have been the "Ahmad Padishah".

== Family ==
Göde Ahmad married his maternal first cousin Aynışah Sultan, a daughter of Sultan Bayezid II, in 1490.

Woods identifies Ughurlu Muhammad's mother, and thus Ahmad's paternal grandmother, as an unnamed daughter of Dawlatshah Bulduqani of Eğil. Ughurlu Muhammad had previously married a daughter of his maternal uncle Isa II Bulduqani; Woods records three children from that marriage, Mahmud, Husayn and an unnamed daughter, who were Ahmad's paternal half-siblings.

Ottoman genealogical works cited below give Ahmad and Aynışah a son and two daughters:

- Neslihan Hanımsultan; married to her cousin Şehzade Alaeddin Ali, son of Şehzade Ahmed, himself one of Aynışah's half-siblings. She had a daughter, Hvandi Sultan.
- Hanzade Hanımsultan; married in 1508 to Yahyapaşaoğlu Bali Bey, the eldest son of Yahya Pasha. Fodor independently identifies Bali's 1508 bride as a daughter of Ahmad and Aynışah, and establishes that Aynışah married Yahya Pasha after Ahmad's death; Bali therefore married his stepmother's daughter. The union was a failure, as the couple lived in separation and the princess, per a report of her behaviour to Sultan Selim in 1516, engaged in a string of scandalous acts. Caught committing adultery with a man at Skopje, who was killed along with six members of her household, she then relocated against permission to Istanbul where she took a young Quran reciter, known as Dellakoğlu Bak, as a lover, bearing him a daughter who died aged approximately six months. Upon his death of malaria at Babaeski, en route from Edirne to Istanbul, she found a new companion in his brother. The letter's author, most likely Selim's son and her own cousin, the future Suleiman the Magnificent, then based at Edirne, credited her acts to the help of her "boundless and unparalleled" wealth and several named procuring servants.
- Sultanzade Zeyneddin Bey (May/June 1497 – 1508).

Separately, Woods's reconstruction of the Aq Qoyunlu dynasty records a son of Ahmad named Zaynal b. Ahmad b. Ughurlu Muhammad, who briefly ruled in Diyarbakır after Alvand's death in 1504/5. Bosworth likewise lists Zayn al-'Abidin b. Ahmad b. Ughurlu Muhammad as ruler in Diyar Bakr from 1504 to 1508.

== Quotes ==
One of the poets says: "They made Rum's cabbage the sultan of the world, and when winter came, they threw it underground."

— Hasan Beg Rumlu

Ahmad Padishah ascends the throne of Azerbaijan, but he is martyred through Aybasultan's opposition.

— Khwandamir

Had been driven by his desire for his rightfully inherited sovereignty.

— Sharafkhan Bidlisi

These lands (Iran) would become united with those lands (Ottomans) and nothing other than fraternity will prevail and the affairs of this land will be eased as he (Sultan Ahmad) has been raised in the shadow of the just emperor (Bayezid).

— Ferīdūn Beg

== Sources ==
- Savory, Roger M. (1964). "The Struggle for Supremacy in Persia after the death of Tīmūr". Der Islam. 40. De Gruyter: 35–65. doi:10.1515/islm.1964.40.1.35. S2CID 162340735.
- Quiring-Zoche, R. (1986). "Āq Qoyunlū". Encyclopædia Iranica, online edition, Vol. II, Fasc. 2. New York. pp. 163–168.
- Woods, John E. (1999). The Aqquyunlu: Clan, Confederation, Empire (Revised and Expanded ed.). University of Utah Press. ISBN 978-0874805659.
- Bosworth, Clifford Edmund (1996). The New Islamic Dynasties: A Chronological and Genealogical Manual. Edinburgh University Press.
- Fodor, Pál (2019). "Wolf on the Border: Yahyapaşaoğlu Bali Bey (?-1527)". In Fodor, Pál; Kovács, Nándor Erik; Péri, Benedek (eds.). Şerefe. Studies in Honour of Prof. Géza Dávid on His Seventieth Birthday. Budapest: Research Centre for the Humanities, Hungarian Academy of Sciences. pp. 57–87.
- Sakaoğlu, Necdet (2008). Bu mülkün kadın sultanları: Vâlide sultanlar, hâtunlar, hasekiler, kadınefendiler, sultanefendiler. Oğlak Yayıncılık.
- Uluçay, Mustafa Çağatay (2011). Padışahların kadınları ve kızları (in Turkish). Türk Tarihi Kurumu Yayınları.
