= Qasim Bey =

Beg of Aq Qoyunlu from 1497 to 1501

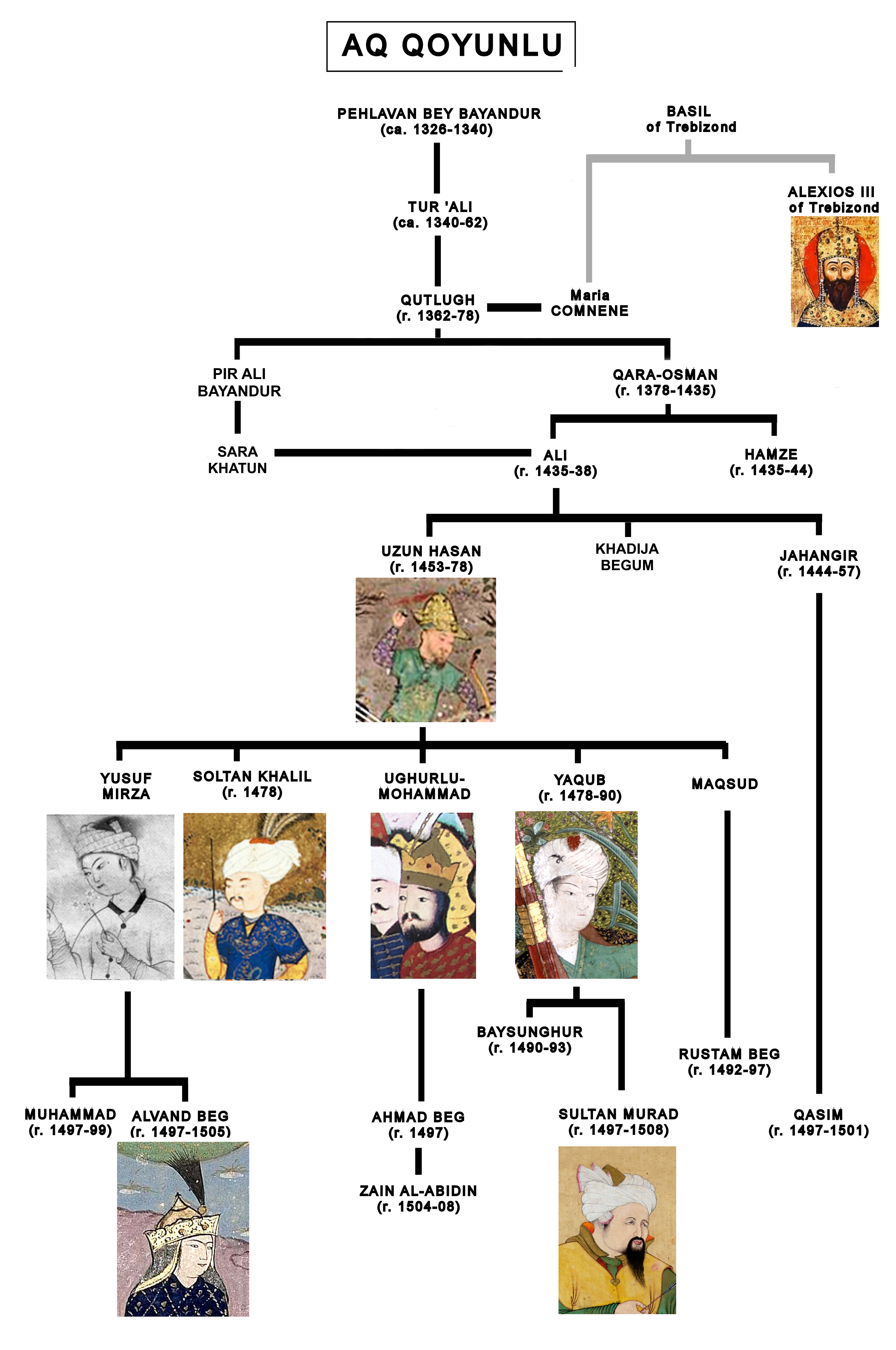
Qasim in the Aq Qoyunlu genealogy

Qasim Bey or Qasim Beg or Qāsem bin Jahāngīr was the Sultan of the Aq Qoyunlu in Diyarbakir from 1497 to 1501.

Qasim Bey came from the Aq-Qoyunlu clan. He was the son of Bey Jahangir. After his father's death in 1469, he became the governor in Erzincan. However, there is little information about this period of Kasim's life.

In 1497, after the death of Ahmad Beg, three Sultans ruled at the same time: Alvand Beg in the west, Qasim in Diyarbakir, and Alvand’s brother Muhammad in Fārs and ʿErāq-e ʿAǰam (where he was succeeded in 1500 by his brother Murad). Qasim soon occupied all of the Aq-Qoyunlu's Asia Minor possessions, assuming the title of Sultan. He was engaged in the development of Diyarbakir and Mardin, his main cities. However, in 1497, Sultan Kasim was overthrown by Alvand Beg, who annexed these territories.

After the defeat of Alvand to the Safavids in 1501, power in Diyarbakir was seized by Zayn al-Abidin (r.1504–1514), the son of Sultan Ahmad Beg.

== Sources ==
- Woods, John E. (1999). The Aqquyunlu: clan, confederation, empire (Rev. and expanded ed.). Salt Lake City: Univ. of Utah Press. ISBN 978-0874805659.
- Quiring-Zoche, R. (2013). AQ QOYUNLŪ. Encyclopedia Iranica.
