= Ughurlu Muhammad =

Prince of the Aq Qoyunlu

- Beg
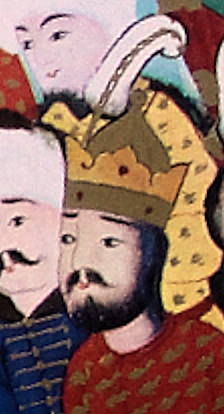
- Ughurlu Muhammad in 16th century Hünername

Governor of Isfahan
- Tenure: 1469 – 1474

Beylerbey of Sivas
- Tenure: 1474 – 1477
- Born: November 1442; Diyarbakır, Aq Qoyunlu
- Died: 1477 (aged 34–35); Erzincan, Ottoman Empire
- Burial: Çayıryolu, Bayburt
- Spouse: ? Hatun (daughter of Isa II Bulduqani-Mardasi); Gevherhan Hatun
- Issue: Mahmud Bayandur; Husayn Bayandur; Ahmad Beg; A daughter
- Dynasty: Aq Qoyunlu
- Father: Uzun Hasan
- Mother: Jan Khatun
- Religion: Sunni Islam
- Military career
- Service years: 1467 - 1477
- Conflicts: Battle of Otlukbeli; Battle of Malatya

Ughurlu Muhammad Beg or Ughurlu Mehmed (Azerbaijani: Uğurlu Məhəmməd bəy; Persian: اغورلو محمد بیگ, romanized: Oghūrlū Moḥammad Bey; Turkish: Uğurlu Mehmed Bey; Novembre 1442 - 1477) was a prince of the Aq Qoyunlu and the oldest son of Uzun Hasan and Jan Khatun, he was also a son in law of Mehmed the Conqueror.

== Early life ==
He was born in November 1442 to Uzun Hasan and Jan Khatun, 8 months after his elder half-brother Khalil. His time of birth was considered auspicious, as he won few battles against Arab tribesmen near Raqqa, for which he was given the nickname "Ughurlu" ("Lucky" in Oghuz Turkic). Dawlatshah was a ruler of Kurdish clan of Bulduqani-Mardasi, controlling Principality of Eğil.

== Career under Uzun Hasan ==
At the age of 17, he was appointed as governor of newly conquered Karahisar. He later captured Koyulhisar with his troops under his father's orders same year, leaving a deputy there. However, Mehmed II's 20,000 strong army soon besieged Koyulhisar later in winter of 1459-1460 which Ughurlu couldn't resist. Instead, Mehmed's army was pushed back by the Aq Qoyunlu army in spring 1460. He was married around this time to his cousin, a daughter of Isa II Bulduqani-Mardasi in Erzincan.

=== Conquest of Qara Qoyunlu ===
Following the death of Jahan Shah in 1467, Uzun Hasan embarked on a quest to conquer rest of Qara Qoyunlu lands. Ughurlu Muhammad was tasked with subduing Baghdad, whose ruler Pir Muhammad of Alpaut tribe was resisting. Moving with 2,000 troops, Ughurlu raided Kurdish tribal lands, but was unable to continue the siege of the city. City resisted until Uzun Hasan's arrival in spring 1468. Uzun Hasan moved on to conquer Tabriz from Hasan Ali, using his envoy Sultan Mahmud Hajilu's killing along 30 followers. This time Ughurlu was tasked by pursuing troops of Mahmud - Uzun Hasan's own uncle who chose to submit to Jahan Shah earlier - in Sarab. By April–May 1469, Hasan Ali was captured and executed by Ughurlu (however, some sources suggest Hasan Ali actually committed suicide).

Ughurlu received newly conquered Persian Iraq where he stationed in its capital, Isfahan for a month. Soon he was tasked by his father again to crush last Qara Qoyunlu loyalist strongholds. Attacking Shiraz and Kirman as head of Aq Qoyunlu's vanguard, he pursued Mirza Yusuf, another son of Jahan Shah until 22 October 1469 near Shabankara. Yusuf was captured and executed by Ughurlu, his followers joined Qara Qoyunlu emir Pir Ali Shakarlu, who left for lands of Timurid Sultan Husayn Bayqara. Ughurlu later left for subduing Luristan, forcing them to be tributary.

=== Against Timurids ===
However, Ughurlu was forced to be dispatched to Khorasan, where Uzun Hasan's Yadgar Muhammad Mirza was defeated by Husayn Bayqara in September 1469. Earlier, his half-brother Khalil commanded a contingent of Aq Qoyunlu army and conquered Herat, installing Yadgar as a vassal of Uzun Hasan. Moving from Isfahan to Astarabad, Ughurlu left Ardestan and while Uzun Hasan himself moved towards Khorasan through Qom. Husayn Bayqara to an the New Aq Qoyunlu invasion of Khorasan. to avoid encountering. Husayn Bayqara submitted of Uzun Hasan in 1471. Ughurlu left Khorasan and joined his father's ordu in Saojbolaq in April 1471, later going back to Isfahan.

=== Campaign against Ottomans and Mamluks ===
A year later, Uzun Hasan marched on Ottoman Empire under the pretext of restoring Pir Ahmed and Kasım of Karaman to Emirate of Karaman, starting a new set of campaigns Tokat was raided by Yusuf Bayandur (Uzun Hasan's cousin), Amir beg of Mawsillu, Kızıl Ahmed Bey of Candar and Karaman princes in 1472. They managed to capture Karaman and reinstall Pir Ahmed bey, however they soon suffered a setback in Battle of Kıreli on 14 August 1472. Meanwhile, Uzun Hasan sent ultimatums from Mecca to Cairo to submit his authority. Now encroached in two fronts, Ughurlu Muhammad was given the task of capturing Birecik, then a Mamluk territory in November–December 1472. However, Mamelukes didn't lose time to strike back. Unable to withstand emir Yashbak min Mahdi, Ughurlu was forced to withdraw from Birecik, while Amir beg was killed in March 1473.

Soon Uzun Hasan made another punitive march on Ottomans. Ughurlu was given the task of leading ambush group with 10,000 cavalry, luring Ottoman general Hass Murad Pasha. Soon Hass Murad fell into trap, killing Hass Murad alongside 4,000 soldiers, while also capturing Turahanoğlu Ömer Bey on 4 August 1473. Sending captives back to Uzun Hasan, Ughurlu Muhammad requested an immediate attack on Mahmud Pasha Angelović, using the shock of defeat. Uzun Hasan was persuaded otherwise by his khatun Seljukshah, who was the mother of Khalil. According to Tihrani, the khatun didn't want extra prestige for Ughurlu who could prove a rival for her son.

=== Battle of Otlukbeli ===
Persuaded by his wife, Uzun Hasan changed the leadership of the army and led it himself, with his youngest son Zeynel bey and Sufi Khalil Beg Mawsilu and Sulayman Beg Bijan leading right flank, while his nephews Murad and Alikhan (both sons of Jahangir Bayandur) led the left wing. Ughurlu on the other hand, was tasked with reinforcing the left flank with a swift force, taking precautionary measures for a tactical strike as a backup plan. However, he soon was forced to join the fight as Şehzade Bayezid's attacked him on a hill, where he fiercely defended a stream between the Ottomans and his troops and prevented Şehzade Bayezid from crossing their side. Soon his brother Zeynel bey fell by a strike of an azeb soldier called Mahmud Ağa. Pir Muhammad, former governor of Baghdad, was captured by azebs, who mistook him for Uzun Hasan. Having heard the news that his father had escaped and his brother was killed, he also withdrew from the battlefield.

== Rebellion and death ==
The conflict between Uzun Hasan and Ughurlu Muhammad that started because of battle preparations was exacerbated by the issue of succession prompted by Uzun Hasan's purported illness in 1474. Two factions swiftly emerged, both in the provinces and at the court. The dominant court group was led by Uzun Hasan's principal wife and cousin, Saljuqshah Begum, who pursued the succession for her eldest son, Sultan Khalil, the then governor of Fars. The opposition comprised Uzun Hasan's mother, and Theodora Komnene, mother of Maqsud, who endorsed Ughurlu Muhammad's candidacy. The party was represented in the provinces by the Chakirlu clan, which governed Mughan plain, and Uvays Bayandur, the brother of Uzun Hasan, who served as the governor of Urfa. Maqsud, the governor of Baghdad, seemingly favored his half-brother Ughurlu Muhammad; but, he was restrained by his atabeg Dana Khalil, the brother of Saljuqshah and cousin of Uzun Hasan.

Ughurlu soon made his move by capturing Shiraz from Khalil. Uzun Hasan, now alarmed by rebellion soon left capital Tabriz for Shiraz. However, this move prompted Chakirlus to occupy capital. However Ughurlu soon fled to his uncle Uvays, giving Uzun Hasan the opportunity to punish Chakirlu, as well as arresting Maqsud. Ughurlu's mother escaped to Cairo and was given asylum by Qaitbay. Uvays too was defeated and executed in July 1475, forcing Ughurlu to take refuge in the Ottoman Empire. Mehmed the Conqueror welcomed him and got him married to his daughter Gevherhan Hatun and installed him as governor of Sivas. During his tenure in Sivas, Ahmed-i Bardahî wrote his Jami-ul Faris and dedicated it to him and his son Mahmud.

Ughurlu was a threat to Khalil as long as he lived. According to Ibn Kemal, who grew up with Ughurlu's son Ahmad in Amasya, Seljukshah spread rumors that her husband died and Aq Qoyunlu commands elected Ughurlu Muhammad to throne. Receiving fabricated letters and believing the rumors, Ughurlu was invited to Tabriz. ambushed near Erzincan by Sulayman Beg Bijan and Bayandur b. Rustam b. Murad (a grandson of Qara Yuluk Uthman Beg). His wife and son escaped to Constantinople. Ottoman authors later claimed that Uzun Hasan was enraged seeing his son's severed head and vowed to punish the murderers, which led Saljuqshah Begum to poison him. He was buried in Çayıryolu, Bayburt, next to the tomb of his ancestor Fakhr-ud-Din Qutlugh.

== Family ==
He was married at least twice:

1. His cousin, a daughter of Isa II Bulduqani-Marasi, his maternal uncle in 1460, with whom he had:
  - Mahmud Bayandur (k. 1491) — killed in 1491 by Baysunghur in a bid to throne.
  - Husayn Bayandur (d. October 1492) — escaped to Cairo with his mother in 1477, married a daughter of Sultan Yaqub, lived last days of his life in Hijaz.
  - A daughter — married to Husayn b. Alikhan, grandson of Jahangir Bayandur
2. Gevherhan Hatun (m. 1474, d. 1514) — daughter of Mehmed II
  - Ahmad Beg — Sultan of the Aq Qoyunlu in 1497

== Sources ==
- Woods, John E. (1999). The Aqquyunlu: clan, confederation, empire. Salt Lake City: Univ. of Utah Press. ISBN 978-0-87480-565-9.
- Tihrani, Abu Bakr (2014). Kitab-i Diyarbakriyya (in Turkish). Translated by Öztürk, Mürsel. Ankara: Turkish Historical Society. ISBN 978-975-16-2752-0.
