= Iftikharyian family =

The Iftikharyian family was one of the leading Persian families under the Ilkhanate. Native to Qazvin in Persian Iraq, the family claimed descent from the first caliph, Abu Bakr. However, the first recorded member of the family was Iftikhar al-Din Muhammad Bakri, who was a student of Yahya Naysaburi, who was in a turn a student of al-Ghazali (d. 1111). The family first rose to prominence in the 13th century during the Mongol invasion of Iran, where Iftikhar al-Din Muhammad became a member of the court of the Mongol khagan Ögedei Khan.

== Sources ==
- Lane, George (2014). "Persian Notables and the Families Who Underpinned the Ilkhanate". Nomads as Agents of Cultural Change. University of Hawaii Press. pp. 182–213. doi:10.1515/9780824847890-011. ISBN 9780824847890.
