= Gevherhan Hatun (daughter of Mehmed II) =

Ottoman princess (c.1446–1514)

- Born: c. 1446; Edirne, Ottoman Empire
- Died: c. 1514 (aged 67–68); Constantinople, Ottoman Empire
- Burial: Gülbahar Hatun Mausoleum, Fatih, Istanbul
- Spouse: Ughurlu Muhammad (m. 1474; died 1477) Hadım Sinan Pasha (disputed)
- Issue: First marriage Ahmad Beg
- House: Ottoman (by birth); Aq Qoyunlu (by marriage)
- Father: Mehmed II
- Mother: Gülbahar Hatun
- Religion: Sunni Islam

Gevherhan Hatun or Gevherhan Sultan (Ottoman Turkish: گوھرخان خاتون; c. 1446 – c. 1514) was an Ottoman princess, the daughter of Mehmed II (reign 1444–46 and 1451–81) and Gülbahar Hatun, and the full-sister of Bayezid II (reign 1481–1512).

== Early life ==
Gevherhan Hatun was the daughter of Sultan Mehmed II known as "The Conqueror", and his concubine Gülbahar Hatun. She was the older full sister of Sultan Bayezid II.

== Marriage ==
In 1474, Gevherhan married Ughurlu Muhammad, a son of Aq Qoyunlu ruler, Uzun Hassan. Ughurlu Muhammad had rebelled against his father and sought refuge by the Ottomans. Her father welcomed him and got him married to Gevherhan.

Ottoman princesses of Mehmed's time did not marry non-Ottomans, whereas it was more frequent in the past. Gevherhan's marriage to Ughurlu Muhammad was the only exception, which actually proved the rule. Ughurlu Muhammad being an exile from his own land and refugee at the Ottoman court, the Aq Qoyunlu prince might be considered a kind of adjunct member of the Ottoman royal household.

Mehmed installed his new son-in-law in the frontier province of Sivas and promised to supply him with arms and men, with which he would assert his claim to his patrimony at the proper moment. Ughurlu Muhammad was killed in the rebellion he attempted against his father in 1477.

Of this marriage, Ahmad Beg was born. Because of his father's death, Mehmed had his grandson brought to Istanbul. Ahmed married his uncle Sultan Bayezid II's daughter Aynışah Sultan in 1489.

After that date, there is no news of Gevherhan, although, according to some sources, she remarried to Sinan Pasha, an important statesman under Bayezid II who is said to be married to the sultan's sister.

It is possible that he was Gevherhan's second husband or that he was married to one of Bayezid's half-sisters (Bayezid doesn't appear to have any other full sisters) and the source doesn't mention the difference between full sister and half-sister.

== Death ==
When she died around 1514, she was buried beside her mother in her mausoleum located in Fatih Mosque, Istanbul.

== In popular culture ==
In the 2013 Turkish series Fatih, Gevherhan Hatun is played by Turkish actress Hande Soral.

In the Turkish historical fiction TV series Mehmed: Fetihler Sultanı, Gevherhan Hatun is currently portrayed by Turkish actress Berra Aydınlı.

== Sources ==
- Uluçay, Mustafa Çağatay (2011). Padişahların kadınları ve kızları. Ankara, Ötüken.
- Sakaoğlu, Necdet (2008). Bu mülkün kadın sultanları: Vâlide sultanlar, hâtunlar, hasekiler, kadınefendiler, sultanefendiler. Oğlak Yayıncılık. ISBN 978-9-753-29623-6.
