= Battle of Malatya =

Battle between the Aq Qoyunlu and the Ottoman Empire

Date	1 August 1473
Location	Malatya, Turkey 39°58′25″N 40°01′20″E
Result	Aq Qoyunlu victory

Belligerents
Aq Qoyunlu	Ottoman Empire

Commanders and leaders
Ughurlu Muhammad	Hass Murad Pasha †; Turahanoğlu Ömer Bey (POW); Fenarioğlu Ahmed Pasha (POW)

Strength
10,000	Unknown

Casualties and losses
Unknown	4,000 killed

Battle of Malatya (Persian: نبرد مالاتیا Azerbaijani: Malatya döyüşü) (Turkish:Malatya savaşı) On August 1, 1473, a battle took place between the Aq Qoyunlu and the Ottomans in Malatya. As a result of the tactics chosen by Uzun Hasan, the Aq Qoyunlu cavalry deceived the Ottoman army and retreated to the left bank of the Euphrates, where Khassa Murad was defeated. The Ottoman sultan sent one of his officers to the ruler of Aqqoyunlu to make peace. However, the ruler of Aq Qoyunlu did not accept this offer and began to move in the direction of Tarjan.

== Battle ==
In the spring of 1472, the Aq Qoyunlu state, which had started a war against the Ottomans, conducted military operations, captured Tokat, Caesarea, Aksaray and Akşehir, and entered Karaman. However, the tired Aq Qoyunlu cavalry, separated from the main forces, suffered a big defeat near Lake Beyshehir. Due to the winter, both sides stopped the operation. Hassa Murad sent a letter to Uzun Hasan. In the spring of 1473, he announced that he would go on a campaign against him.

In 1473, two armies clashed on the Euphrates. The number of the Aq Qoyunlu army was 10,000, and the number of the Ottomans was Unknown Successful Muhammad led the central part of the army. Before the battle began, he ambushed the Ottomans with 40,000 cavalry. The Ottoman commander Khassa Murad attacked with his main forces. From the very first attack, the Ottoman army, which had been ambushed by the successful Muhammad, was besieged. Thus, the Ottoman army, deceived and defeated on the left bank of the river, suffered 4,000 casualties and retreated. Omar Bey and several Ottoman commanders were captured.
