= Siege of Tabriz (1501) =

Initiation of capital of Safavid Iran

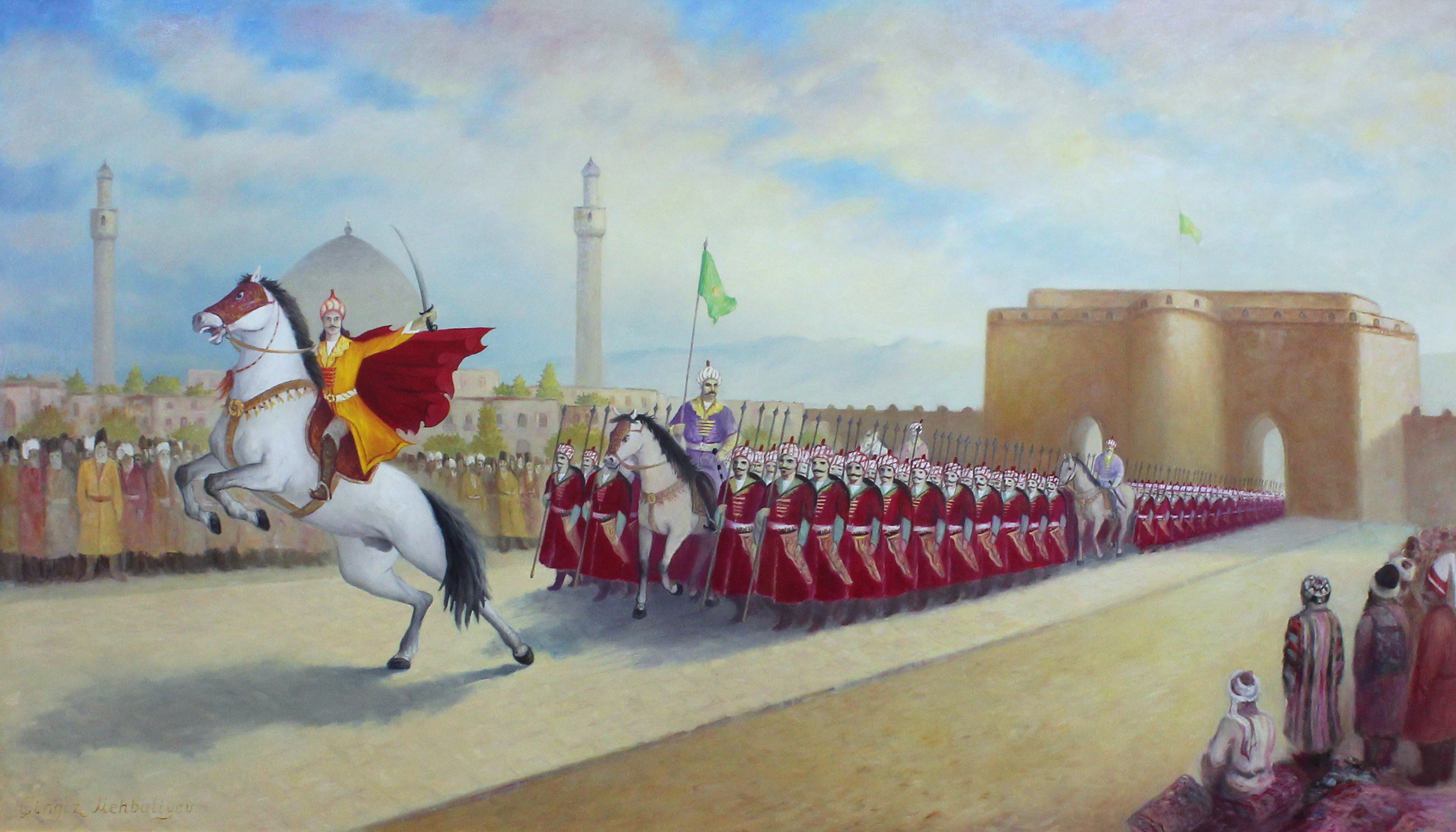
- Ismail declares himself shah after entering Tabriz, painter Chingiz Mehbaliyev, in private collection.
Date	1501
Location	Tabriz, Aq Qoyunlu
Result	Safavid victory
Territorial changes	Safavids capture Tabriz.

Belligerents
Safavid dynasty	Aq Qoyunlu; Dulkadirids

Commanders and leaders
Shah Ismail I Khalvachi Oghlu; Ghoraberi-Qajar †	Alvand Beg; Osman Sultan Torkaman; Ala al-Dawla Bozkurt

Strength
500–5,000	10,000–40,000; 20,000

Casualties and losses
Unknown	5,000 killed 10,000 killed, thousands captured or executed

The siege of Tabriz (Persian: محاصره تبریز) took place in 1501 just after the Safavids had defeated the Aq Qoyunlu in the Battle of Sharur. In the preceding battle the Safavids were able to defeat the Aq Qoyunlus that had an army which was 4 times bigger than the Safavid army. After the siege Ismail I chose Tabriz as his capital and proclaimed himself Shahanshah of Iran.

== Prelude ==
The two armies met on the plain of Sharur. Ismail Mirza had 7,000 men while Sultan Alvand Beg had more than 10,000. According to Roger Savory, Alvand Beg’s army was four times the size of Ismail’s. Ismail Mirza, by showing brilliant courage, won the battle, and Alvand Beg, seeing his army collapse, fled to Erzincan.

== Capture ==
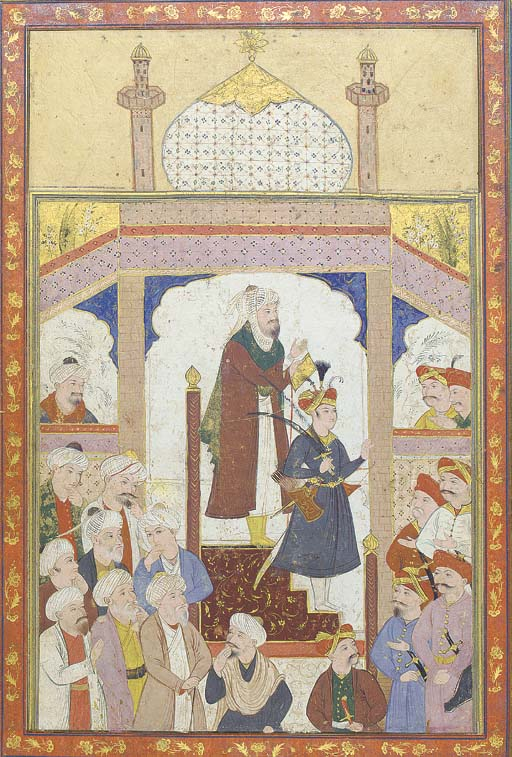
Recitation of the sermon in the name of the Twelver Imams and the proclamation of Shah Ismail's kingship in the Jameh Mosque of Tabriz.

Ibn Kemal (d. 1534), the Sheikh ul-Islam of the Ottoman Empire, known for his harsh fatwas against the Safavids and the Qizilbash, describes Shah Ismail's entry into Tabriz in his book Tawarikh al-Osman:

The misguided Shah entered Tabriz without encountering any resistance. He showed no mercy to the Aq Qoyunlu, destroyed them, and avenged his father. Forty to fifty thousand Aq Qoyunlu, old and young, men and women, were slaughtered. Only the tomb of Uzun Hasan and Mirza Ahmad Qudi were left untouched, while the bones of other amirs and sultans were exhumed and burned. He even killed his own stepmother, the daughter of Hasan Khan, with his own hands, because she condemned infidelity and tyranny and had opposed him.

Angiolello also made similar claims in his travelogue, which suggests he may have received this information from Kemal Pashazade or other Ottomans.

Out of the three Venetian travel writers who recorded the events of the capture of Tabriz, none mention Angiolello’s presence in Iran at that time. Giovanni Battista Ramusio (1485–1557), for example, wrote about the reign of Shah Ismail in his Second Book of Travels based on accounts he had received, including the travelogue of Caterino Zeno (d. 1490). The anonymous Venetian merchant who visited Iran twice between 1507 and 1510 also admitted that the events he described were mostly heardsay.

Hasan Beg Rumlu in his Ahsan al-Tawarikh gives a different description of Ismail's entry into Tabriz:

After being relieved of the enemy, the Alexander-like sovereign descended there and the next day raised the banner of march towards the royal city of Tabriz. The sayyids and notables of that city came to welcome him with honor, kissed his blessed fingers, and offered gifts. The Shah, with great majesty, established himself in Tabriz, the seat of royal power and center of the caliphate of exalted kings, and by the rays of his justice and generosity freed its inhabitants from the darkness of oppression… Soon after his enthronement, he ordered that the preachers in his domains deliver sermons in the names of the Twelve Imams, including the phrases "Ashhadu anna Aliyyan waliyyullah" and "Hayya ‘ala khayr al-‘amal," which had been abandoned since the time of Tughril Beg ibn Mika'il ibn Seljuq and the flight of al-Basasiri—a period of 528 years (actually 456 years). He also ordered that in the bazaars people should curse Abu Bakr, Umar, and Uthman, and whoever disobeyed should be executed.

== Siege ==
In Muharram 909 AH (July 1503), Alvand Beg gathered men in Erzincan and made a desperate move towards Azerbaijan. When the victorious banners of the Shah marched from Torjan towards Erzincan, Alvand entered the royal palace of Tabriz, plundered the people and nobles, and then hurried to Ojan. But when he heard that Shah Ismail, who was in Maku, was approaching, he abandoned Ojan and fled to Hamadan, then to Baghdad, but was opposed by Qasim Beg Purnak, the Aq Qoyunlu governor of Baghdad, so he went on to Diyarbakir.

According to the Alam Ara-ye Safavi, Alvand Mirza, who had 10,000 troops, requested help from Ala al-Dawla Bozkurt, who sent him 20,000 men. When the Shah left Tabriz, on the second day Alvand heard that Ismail was approaching from Van to fight him. He entered Tabriz at sunset, angry with the people for welcoming the Shah and becoming Shia, and killed 7,000 of them. Khalvachi Oghlu, whom the Shah had left in charge with 500 men, defended the Hasan Padeshah Palace with guards and 300 Qurchis firing arrows and muskets. Although Alvand tried, he could not capture the Shah’s harem or his brother. The people of Tabriz gave him no support; the Shia opposed him, and even the Sunnis lost hope in him. By midday on the fourth day, Shah Ismail reentered Tabriz. Alvand could not remain and withdrew towards Diyarbakir. A battle then broke out between the Dulkadirs and the Shah. The Dulkadirs believed Alvand was present, and they fought from noon until sunset, losing 10,000 men. When it was revealed that Alvand had fled at the start, they cursed him and surrendered. The Shah declared that those who proclaimed "Ali is the wali of God" should be spared, but the rest were executed. About two to three thousand were spared, while the rest were killed, and 3,000 fled with Alvand.
