= Shir Sarim =

Shir Sarim or Sarim Khan was a 16th-century Kurdish leader who led an uprising against Safavid Persia during the reign of Shah Ismail I. While some sources describe Shir Sarim as a Yezidi leader, historical sources like E.J. Brill's First Encyclopaedia of Islam identify him as a chieftain of the Kurdish Mokri tribe who succeeded his father Saif al-Dīn and challenged Shah Ismail I.

Sarim was described as being a ”hundred and ten years old, with a white beard hanging down to his navel; and wields an axe that weighs seven maunds, or some 40 kilograms.” In 1505—6, Kurdistan and Diyarbakir were being raided by Shir Sarim and Alā al-Dawla Dhu'l-Qadar. A History of Shah Ismail Safawi (1939) by Ghulam Sarwar, notes that "In the ensuing winter of 1505-6, the Shah proceeded to the frontier of Adharbayjan, for suppressing Shir Sarim, a robber-chief of Kurdistan. After slaughtering his followers and plundering the camp, for Shir Sarim succeeded in escaping, the Shah moved to the river Qizil-Uzfln."

In 912/1506—7 a Safavid force which had been despatched in pursuit of Sarim fought a hard battle with the Kurds in which both sides suffered heavy casualties. Two high-ranking Qizilbash amirs were killed: Abdi Beg Shamlu, who was Ismail’s brother-in-law, and on the inner circle of his companions (ahl-i ikhtisās), and Sārū ’Alī Muhrdār Takkalū. Shir Sarim's son and brother were captured and taken to Tabriz, where they were put to death.

Sarim's uprising lasted for the next four years, from 1506-10. In 1510, Sarim was defeated by a Persian army, and Sarim was captured and killed. The Kurdish prisoners were put to death "with torments worse than which there may not be".
