= Battle of Hamadan (1503) =

Battle of the Safavid-Aq Qoyunlu wars

- Part of Third Safavid Rebellion
Date	June 21, 1503
Location	Hamadan
Result	Safavid victory
Territorial changes	Safavids capture Western Iran and expand their territory.

Belligerents
Safavid Army	Aq Qoyunlu

Commanders and leaders
Ismail I Hossein Laleh Shamlu; Abdal Beg Talish; Mohammad Beg Ustajlu; Bayram Beg Karamanlı; Sari Ali; Hulefa Beg; Piri Beg Qajar; Yegan Bey Tekeli; Abdi Beg Shamlu; Kipchak Mansur Beg	Sultan Murad; Ali Beg Turkmen †; Islamış Beg (executed); Güzel Ahmad (executed); Murad Bey

Strength
12,000	70,000–120,000

Casualties and losses
Unknown	10,000–40,000 killed

The Battle of Hamadan or Alma Bulaghı in 1503 was a conflict between the Safavid Empire, led by Shah Ismail I and the Aq Qoyunlu, commanded by Güzel Ahmad. The battle occurred near the city of Hamadan in Western Persia. Shah Ismail's forces, consisting primarily of Qizilbash warriors, effectively employed superior tactics and firearms to defeat the Aq Qoyunlu cavalry. This decisive victory solidified Safavid control over western Persia and marked a critical step in the establishment of the Safavid Empire. Alwand Mirza fled the battlefield, leading to a further decline of Aq Qoyunlu power in the region.

== Prelude ==
In the spring of 1503, Shah Ismail I sent his murid Kamber Agha with a letter to Sultan Murad, demanding his submission. Reminding him of the kinship ties between the Safavids and the Aq Qoyunlu, Ismail promised that, if Murad recognized his authority, he would annex part of Iraq-i Ajam to Murad. However, Murad rejected the offer. Following this, Ismail marched out of Tabriz with an army of 12,000, crossed the Kızılüzən river, and advanced southwards toward Hamadan. Murad, in response, assembled a much larger force of 70,000 men.

== Battle ==
Under Shah Ismail, commanders Hulefa Bey and Kipchak Mansur Bey were appointed to lead the vanguard, while Qarapiri Bey Qajar was held in reserve with 1,500 cavalry. The remaining Qizilbash emirs—Dede Bey Talish (Abdullali Bey Dede), Husayn Bey Lala, Muhammad Bey Ustajlu, Bayram Bey Karamanlu, Abdi Bey Shamlu, Yegan Bey Tekeli, and Sari Ali (the seal-bearer)—were positioned on the flanks, while Ismail himself took command of the center.

On the Aq Qoyunlu side, Sultan Murad placed Turkmen Ali Bey on the right and Murad Bey on the left. The governor of Kum, Islamish Bey, commanded the vanguard. At the outset of the battle, he successfully repelled the Qizilbash advance, forcing them back toward the center.

At this point, Qarapiri Bey Qajar launched an attack, capturing Islamish Bey and annihilating his detachment. Ismail personally entered the fight, reportedly slaying many enemies with his own hand. The Aq Qoyunlu army collapsed; Ali Bey Turkmen’s force of 10,000 was destroyed, and Guzel Ahmad Bayandur (brother of Eybe Sultan), along with Islamish Bey and others, were captured and executed. Murad himself managed to escape.
