= Shemiran Castle =

Castle in Qazvin Province, Iran

Shemiran castle
- قلعه شمیران
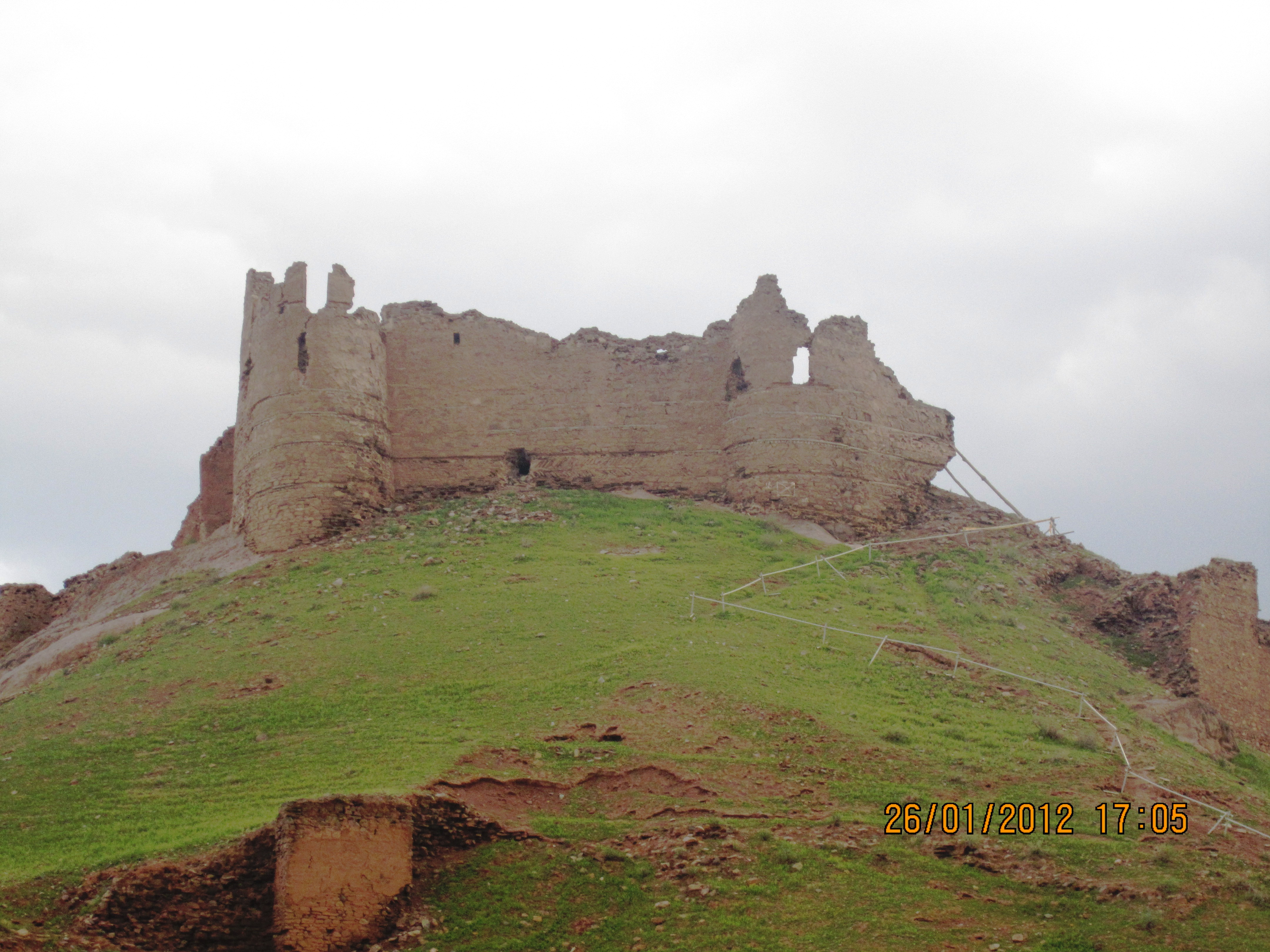
- Interactive map of the Shemiran castle area

General information
- Type: Castle
- Location: Qazvin Province, Iran

Shemiran castle (Persian: قلعه شمیران) is a historical castle located in Qazvin province, The longevity of this fortress dates back to the Nizari Ismaili state.

== See also ==
- Shemiran
