= Rustam Beg =

Sultan of the Aq Qoyunlu from 1492 to 1497

- Padishah
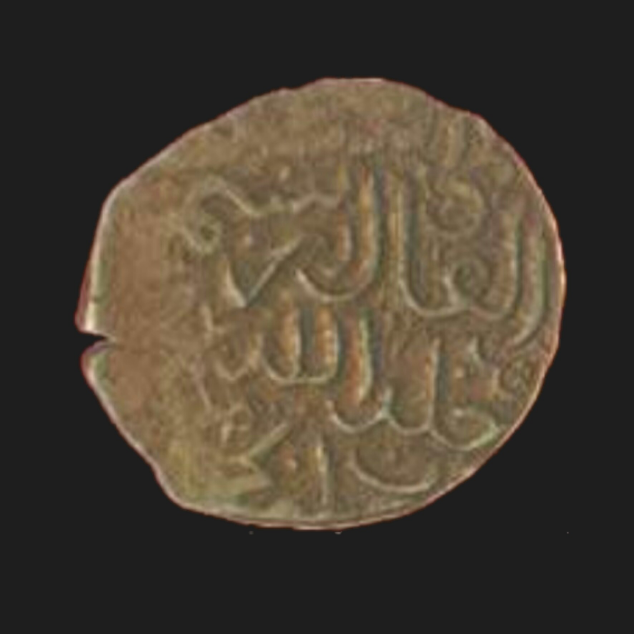
- Coin of Sultan Rustam

Sultan of the Aq Qoyunlu
- Reign: 1492–1497
- Predecessor: Baysunghur
- Successor: Ahmad Beg
- Died: 1497
- Dynasty: Aq Qoyunlu
- Father: Maqsud
- Mother: Shah Khatun
- Religion: Sunni Islam

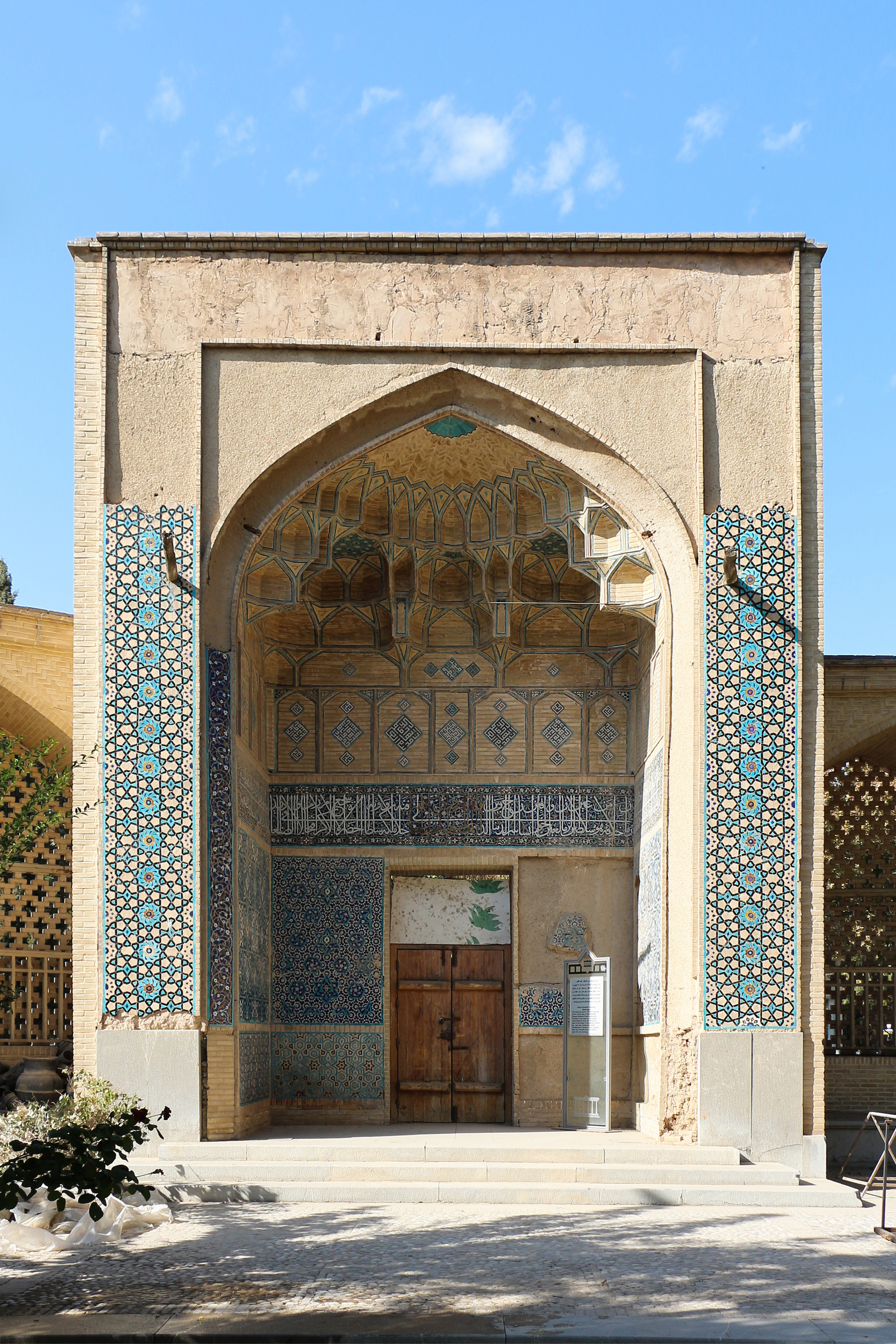
The Darb-e Kooshk Gate in Isfahan, originally built during the reign of Rustam Beg

Rustam Beg Bayandur (Persian: رستم بیگ بایندر) was an Aq Qoyunlu prince who ruled as sultan from 1492 to 1497 during the dynastic struggle that followed the death of Ya'qub Beg (r. 1478–1490). He was the son of Maqsud and Shah Khatun, a daughter of Dana Khalil Bayandur. Through Maqsud, he was a grandson of Uzun Hasan. He was enthroned in Tabriz at the end of May 1492 with the support of his maternal uncle Ayba-Sultan. He was deposed by his cousin Ahmad Beg in 1497 and executed several months later after a failed attempt to recover the throne.

The Darb-e Kooshk Gate in Isfahan dates to Rustam's reign. Its inscription, dated 902 AH (1496–97), names Rustam as the ruling sovereign.

== Sources ==
- Bosworth, C. E. (1996). The New Islamic Dynasties: A Chronological and Genealogical Manual. New York: Columbia University Press. ISBN 978-0-231-10714-3.
- Langaroodi, Reza Rezazadeh; Negahban, Farzin (2015). "Āq-qūyūnlū". In Madelung, Wilferd; Daftary, Farhad (eds.). Encyclopaedia Islamica Online. Brill Online. ISSN 1875-9831.
- Mitchell, Colin P. (2009). The Practice of Politics in Safavid Iran: Power, Religion and Rhetoric. I.B.Tauris. ISBN 978-0857715883.
- Quiring-Zoche, R. (1986). "Āq Qoyunlū". Encyclopædia Iranica, online edition. Vol. II, Fasc. 2. New York. pp. 163–168.
- Woods, John E. (1999). The Aqquyunlu: Clan, Confederation, Empire (Revised and expanded ed.). Salt Lake City: University of Utah Press. ISBN 978-0-87480-565-9.
