= Battle of Sharur =

1501 battle between the Qizilbash forces of Ismail Safavi and the Aq Qoyunlu

- Part of Safavid–Aq Qoyunlu Wars
Date	1501
Location	Sharur, near Nakhchivan
Result	Safavid victory
Territorial changes	Safavid advance to Tabriz and establishment of Safavid rule in Azerbaijan

Belligerents
Safavid order	Aq Qoyunlu

Commanders and leaders
Ismail ibn Shaykh Haydar	Alvand Mirza

Strength
About 7,000	Reportedly more than four times Ismail's force

Casualties and losses
Unknown	Unknown; a later Safavid account claimed up to 18,000 killed

The Battle of Sharur was fought in 1501 near Sharur, close to Nakhchivan, between the forces of Ismail ibn Shaykh Haydar and the Aq Qoyunlu army of Alvand Mirza. Ismail decisively defeated Alvand, after which the Qizilbash advanced unopposed on Tabriz, the former Aq Qoyunlu imperial capital. The victory was an important step in the establishment of Safavid rule in Iran, and expelled Alvand from Azerbaijan.

== Background ==
During the civil wars that followed the death of Uzun Hasan, the Aq Qoyunlu state became increasingly fragmented. In 1500, Alvand and Sultan Murad concluded a partition agreement under which Alvand was accorded Diyar Bakr, Armenia, Azerbaijan, Mughan, and Arran, while Sultan Murad received Persian Iraq, Kerman, Fars, and Arabian Iraq. This division of the Aq Qoyunlu realm greatly facilitated Ismail's subsequent conquests.

Ismail, who had emerged from his refuge in Gilan in 1499, gathered a substantial body of Qizilbash followers near Erzincan in 1500. Roger Savory gives the strength of this force as 7,000 men drawn principally from the Ustajlu, Rumlu, Takkalu, Dhu'l-Qadar, Afshar, Qajar, and Varsaq tribes. Ismail then campaigned against the Shirvanshahs. Farrukh Yasar was defeated and killed at the Battle of Jabani, and Shirvan passed under Qizilbash control within a few months.

Alarmed by Ismail's successes in Shirvan, Alvand mobilized the Aq Qoyunlu armies of Azerbaijan and Armenia and deployed them along the Georgian–Shirvani frontier. Before confronting Alvand's principal army, the Qizilbash defeated the Aq Qoyunlu advance forces sent against them.

Ismail and Alvand were also relatives through the Aq Qoyunlu ruling house: both were grandsons of Uzun Hasan. Alvand was a son of Yusuf Beg, son of Uzun Hasan, while Ismail's mother was a daughter of Uzun Hasan. A later Safavid historical tradition explicitly portrayed the confrontation as a conflict among the grandsons of Uzun Hasan.

== Battle ==
The two armies met at Sharur near Nakhchivan. After routing the Aq Qoyunlu advance units, the Qizilbash crushed Alvand's main army.

The precise strengths of the opposing armies are uncertain. Savory states that Ismail had mobilized a force of 7,000 Qizilbash and that Alvand's army at Sharur was more than four times the size of Ismail's. Kaveh Farrokh likewise gives Ismail's force at Sharur as 7,000 and dates the battle to July or August 1501.

Casualty figures for the battle are uncertain. Farrokh reports that the later Safavid chronicle ʿĀlam-ārā-ye Ṣafavī claimed that as many as 18,000 of Alvand's troops were killed. Alvand survived the defeat and fled the battlefield.

== Aftermath ==
Following Alvand's defeat, the Qizilbash marched unopposed on Tabriz. The Qizilbash occupied the former Aq Qoyunlu imperial capital in the latter part of 1501. Ismail subsequently assumed the title of Shah in Tabriz, marking the establishment of the Safavid dynasty in Iran.

The sources do not agree on the precise date of Ismail's enthronement. Kioumars Ghereghlou notes that the sixteenth-century historian Qasim Beg Hayati Tabrizi gives the specific date 1 Jumada II 907 AH, corresponding to 22 December 1501, for Ismail's enthronement in Tabriz.

The battle did not, however, end Alvand's political career. Alvand may have temporarily recovered Tabriz in the summer of 1502 while Ismail was occupied elsewhere, but was almost immediately expelled. Azerbaijan thereafter served as a base for Qizilbash expansion against the territories of Sultan Murad.

After his second expulsion from Azerbaijan, Alvand withdrew to Diyar Bakr. There he came into conflict with his kinsman Qasim b. Jahangir, whom he defeated and captured near Mardin. Alvand subsequently ruled independently in Diyar Bakr until his death in 1504–1505, maintaining communications with anti-Safavid groups in Iran and with the Ottomans.

== Sources ==
- Farrokh, Kaveh (2011). Iran at War: 1500–1988. Osprey Publishing. ISBN 978-1-78096-221-4.
- Ghereghlou, Kioumars (October–December 2017). "Chronicling a Dynasty on the Make: New Light on the Early Ṣafavids in Ḥayātī Tabrīzī's Tārīkh (961/1554)". Journal of the American Oriental Society. 137 (4): 805–832. doi:10.7817/jameroriesoci.137.4.0805.
- Savory, Roger M.; Karamustafa, Ahmet T. (1998). "Esmāʿīl I Ṣafawī". Encyclopædia Iranica. Vol. VIII, Fasc. 6. pp. 628–636.
- Woods, John E. (1999). The Aqquyunlu: Clan, Confederation, Empire (Revised and expanded ed.). Salt Lake City: University of Utah Press. ISBN 978-0-87480-565-9.
