= Alvand Beg =

Aq Qoyunlu prince and ruler (died 1504/5)

Alvand Mirza Beg
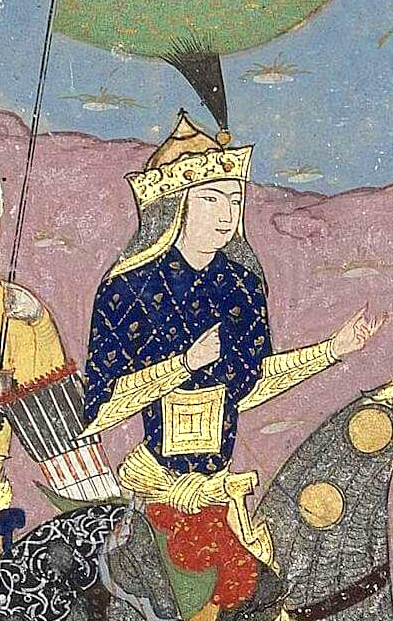
- Alvand Mirza before the Battle of Sharur (1501). Habib al-Siyar, 1590–1600.

Sultan of the Aq Qoyunlu
- Reign: 1497–1504/5
- Predecessor: Ahmad Beg
- Successor: Ismail I (Safavid Iran)
- Died: 1504/5; Mardin
- Dynasty: Aq Qoyunlu
- Father: Yusuf Beg
- Religion: Islam

Alvand Mirza Beg was an Aq Qoyunlu prince, a grandson of Uzun Hasan through his son Yusuf Beg, and a contender for the throne between 1497 and 1504/5.

== Life ==
He was a son of Yusuf Beg, himself a son of Uzun Hasan and Saljuqshah Begum. He should not be confused with another Alvand, a son of Sultan Khalil, whom Sultan Khalil appointed governor of Fars in 1478. After the death of Ahmad Beg, he came to power in Azerbaijan. In 1500–1501, he became the ruler of a part of the divided Aq Qoyunlu state.

== Reign ==
Alvand Beg was supported by Gazi Bey Bayandur and Kazim Bey Purnak. His first action was to drive his brother Muhammadi Beg out of Yazd. Muhammadi Beg fled to Isfahan. In the following battle, Alvand Beg was defeated and retreated to Tabriz. After this event, Sultan Murad was summoned from Shirvan by Eybe Sultan's brothers. He came from Shiraz to Isfahan and captured Muhammadi in the year 1499, exiling him to Tabriz. Alvand Beg and Murad made peace in Abhar, as a result of which Diyarbakir (Eastern Anatolia) and Azerbaijan went to Alvand Beg, while Lower Mesopotamia, Persian Iraq, and Fars remained under Sultan Murad.

== Struggle with the Safavids ==
After receiving news of Shah Ismail's victory over the Shirvanshahs, Alvand Beg arrived in Nakhchivan from Tabriz with a large army. He sent Muhammad Garajan, a military leader, to Ganja and Karabakh to prevent the Qizilbash from crossing the Kura River. However, the Qizilbash managed to cross the Kura River and annihilate the army sent by Alvand. Despite sending a letter requesting to return to Shah Ismail's service, he received a refusal. Consequently, he was sent to prepare for battle at the Sharur plains. Yet, in the Battle of Sharur in 1501, Alvand Beg faced defeat. In the same year, Ismail entered Tabriz and declared himself Shah, establishing the foundation of the Safavid state with Tabriz as its capital. Alvand Beg managed to escape to Erzincan for his safety.

== See also ==
- List of rulers of Aq Qoyunlu

== Sources ==
- Langaroodi, Reza Rezazadeh; Negahban, Farzin (2015). "Āq-qūyūnlū". In Madelung, Wilferd; Daftary, Farhad (eds.). Encyclopaedia Islamica Online. Brill Online. ISSN 1875-9831.
- Savory, Roger M. (1964). "The Struggle for Supremacy in Persia after the death of Tīmūr". Der Islam. 40. De Gruyter: 35–65. doi:10.1515/islm.1964.40.1.35. S2CID 162340735.
- Woods, John E. (1999). The Aqquyunlu: Clan, Confederation, Empire (Revised and Expanded ed.). University of Utah Press. ISBN 978-0874805659.
