= Sultan Murad (Aq Qoyunlu) =

Aq Qoyunlu ruler

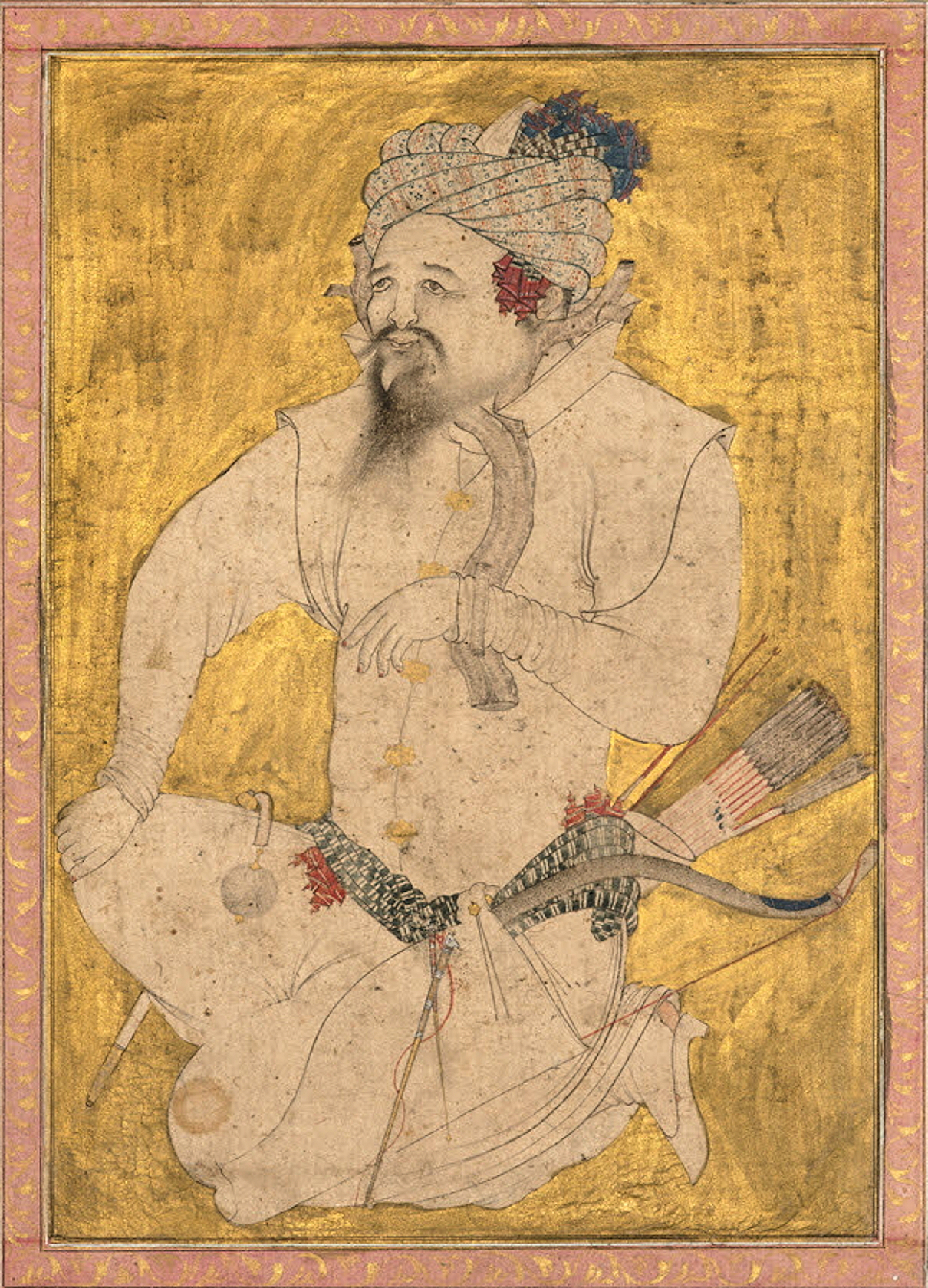
- Likely portrait of Sultan Murad as a prisoner of Shah Ismail, early 16th century. Louvre Museum

Sultan of the Aq Qoyunlu
- Reign: 1497–1508
- Predecessor: Ahmad Beg
- Born: 1483
- Died: 1514 (aged 41); Ruha, Diyar Bakr
- Spouse: Beglu Khatun
- Issue: Hasan; Ya'qub; Jan Agha Khanum
- Dynasty: Aq Qoyunlu
- Father: Ya'qub Beg
- Mother: Gawhar-Sultan Khanum
- Religion: Sunni Islam

Sultan Murad (also spelled Sultan-Murad; Persian: سلطان مراد) was the last sultan of the Aq Qoyunlu from 1497 to 1508. After losing his kingdom to the Safavid Shah Ismail I (r. 1501–1524), he fled to Diyar Bakr, where he was eventually killed by Shah Ismail's Qizilbash soldiers at the end of 1514.

== Reign ==
=== Civil war in the Aq Qoyunlu realm ===
Born in 1483, he was a son of Sultan Ya'qub Beg (r. 1478–1490) and Gawhar-Sultan Khanum, the daughter of the Shirvanshah Farrukh Yasar (r. 1465–1500). Residing in Shirvan, Sultan Murad (who was 7 years old at that time) was summoned by the rebel commanders Ayba-Sultan Bayandur and Qasim Beg Purnak, who wanted to make him the figurehead of their government. When the news reached the Aq Qoyunlu ruler Ahmad Beg (r. 1497), he raised a large army and marched towards the rebels. On 13–14 December 1497, a battle ensured near the city of Isfahan, where the forces of Ayba-Sultan Bayandur and Qasim Beg Purnak defeated the numerically superior army of Ahmad Beg, who was killed.

In the spring of 1498, while Ayba-Sultan was on his way to the capital Tabriz to welcome Sultan Murad, he was met by opposition by his officers, whom he subsequently expelled. He then dislodged Sultan Murad's Shirvani escort, and had the latter imprisoned in a fortress near Maragha. In order to strengthen his position more, Ayban-Sultan married Sultan Murad's mother. He now became the strongest person in the Aq Qoyunlu realm once again, and had Alvand Beg enthroned in Tabriz. After Ayban-Sultan was killed in a battle in May–June 1499 with the Aq Qoyunlu prince Muhammadi, Sultan Murad was freed by Ayban-Sultan's brother Güzel Ahmad Bayandur (who govnered Maragha) and cousin Farrukhsad. Together, they fled to Qasim Beg Purnak in the southern Iranian region of Fars. They subsequently deposed the Afshar governor of the provincial capital Shiraz and installed Sultan Murad there.

=== War with Shah Ismail I ===
In the winter of 1502 or 1503, the Safavid Shah Ismail I (r. 1501–1524) contacted Sultan Murad, who was in control over Fars and Persian Iraq, albeit mostly nominally. In reality, his governors ruled freely. The provinces were in disarray due to ceaseless war, famine, plague, and oppression by the Aq Qoyunlu dignitaries. Ismail reminded Sultan Murad of the common lineage that the Safavids and Aq Qoyunlu shared, and offered him part of Persian Iraq in exchange for compliance, or war would occur.

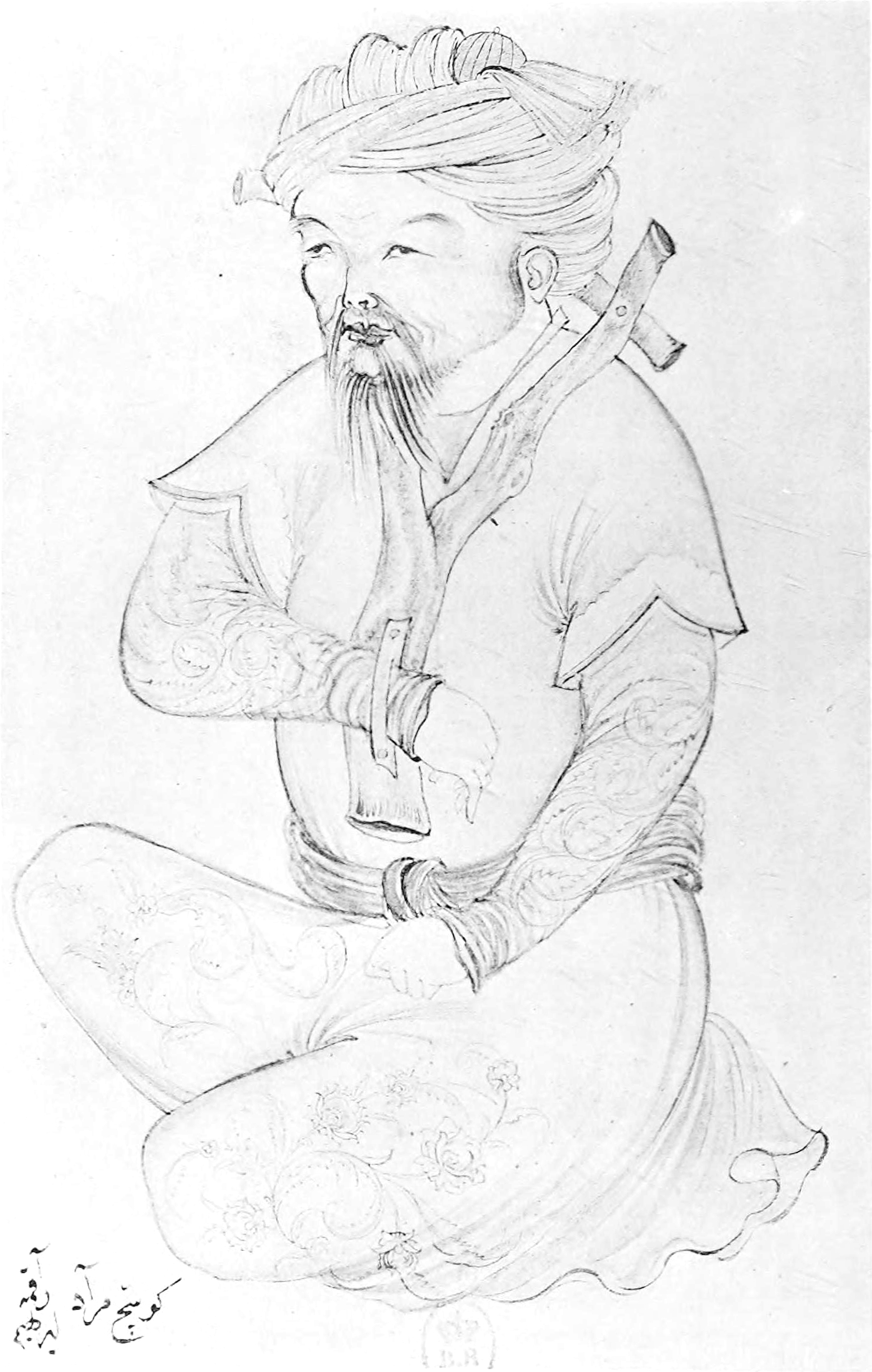
Drawing with inscription "Kusej Murad" ("Murad with the thin beard", ie prince Murad Akkoyunlu). Tabriz, early 16th century.

Although some of Murad's men advocated peace, the latter marched towards Ismail (whose army totalled 12,000) at head of 70,000 men, but was defeated near the city of Hamadan on 21 June 1503, losing 10,000 men and his amir al-umara (supreme commander) Güzel Ahmad. Ismail soon invaded Fars, capturing Shiraz on 24 September 1503 and entrusting it to Elyas Beg Dhu'l-Qadar, whose family would occupy the office for almost 50 years. Azerbaijan, Fars, and most of Persian Iraq was now under Safavid rule, while the Timurid rebel and ruler of Astarabad, Muhammad Husayn Mirza, had made an alliance with Ismail. Meanwhile, Murad fled to the city of Mar'ash, and would later be killed in Ruha, Diyar Bakr by Shah Ismail's Qizilbash soldiers at the end of 1514. In the words of the 16th-century Safavid chronicler Qazi Ahmad Qomi, after Sultan Murad's death "the line of the Aq Qoyunlu sultans was severed."

== Offspring ==
Sultan Murad was survived by several of his offsprings. He had two sons with the daughter of Ala al-Dawla Bozkurt, Beglu Khatun: Hasan and Ya'qub, but nothing is known about them. He also had a daughter, Jan Agha Khanum, who would eventually marry the Safavid governor-general of Khorasan and guardian of the Safavid prince Abbas, Ali-Qoli Khan Shamlu (died 1589).

== Sources ==
- Quiring-Zoche, R. (1986). "Āq Qoyunlū". Encyclopædia Iranica, online edition, Vol. II, Fasc. 2. New York. pp. 163–168.
- Savory, Roger M. (1965). "The Consolidation of Safawid power in Persia". Jahresband. 40. De Gruyter: 71–94. doi:10.1515/islm.1965.41.1.71. S2CID 161679360.
- Woods, John E. (1999). The Aqquyunlu: Clan, Confederation, Empire (Revised and Expanded ed.). University of Utah Press. ISBN 978-0874805659.
- Venzke, Margaret L. (2017). "Dulkadir". In Fleet, Kate; Krämer, Gudrun; Matringe, Denis; Nawas, John; Stewart, Denis J. (eds.). Encyclopaedia of Islam. Vol. III. E. J. Brill.

Preceded by Ahmad Beg	Sultan of the Aq Qoyunlu; 1497–1508	Succeeded by End of the Aq Qoyunlu
