= Persian Iraq =

Historical region in Iran

Map of Persian Iraq and its surroundings

Persian Iraq, also uncommonly spelled Persian Irak (Persian: عراقِ عجم Erāq-e Ajam or عراق عجمی Erāq-e Ajami; Arabic: عراق العجم ʿIrāq al-ʿAjam or العراق العجمي al-ʿIrāq al-ʿAjamī, literally, "Iraq of the Ajam"), is a historical region of western Iran.

The region, known as Media in pre-Islamic times, became known as Jibal ("mountain, hill") to early Islamic geographers for its mountainous terrain. During the Seljuk era in the 11th and 12th centuries, it began to be called ʿIrāq-i ʿAjam(ī) ("Persian Iraq").

According to the medieval historian and geographer Yaqut al-Hamawi, the name ʿIrāq-i ʿAjam(ī) arose when the Seljuk sultans, who were addressed as "sulṭān al-ʿIrāq", came to rule both Iraq proper and Jibal, and made Hamadan in Jibal their capital city. This direct rule by the sulṭān al-ʿIrāq resulted in the region becoming known as Iraq, with the word Ajami ("Persian") added to distinguish it from ʿIrāq-i ʿArab(ī) ("Arab Iraq") in Mesopotamia. Following the Mongol invasion of Iran in the 13th century, the name Jibal had become completely outdated. In the following century, the geographer Hamdallah Mustawfi was unaware of the name Jibal, and only knew it as 'Iraq-i Ajami'. It was regarded by him as sardsīr (a "cold zone").

Later, until the beginning of the 20th century, the term Iraq in Iran was used to refer to a much smaller region south of Saveh and west of Qom. This region was centered on Soltanabad, which was later renamed Arak.

== General and cited references ==
- Bosworth, C. E. (1998). "ʿERĀQ-E ʿAJAM(Ī)". In Yarshater, Ehsan (ed.). Encyclopædia Iranica. Vol. VIII/5: English IV–Eršād al-zerāʿa. London and New York: Routledge & Kegan Paul. p. 538. ISBN 978-1-56859-054-7.
- Chisholm, Hugh, ed. (1911). "Irak" . Encyclopædia Britannica. Vol. 14 (11th ed.). Cambridge University Press. p. 740.
- de Planhol, X. (1986). "ARĀK". Encyclopaedia Iranica, Vol. II, Fasc. 3. pp. 247–248.
- Lockhart, L. (1965). "D̲j̲ibāl". In Lewis, B.; Pellat, Ch. & Schacht, J. (eds.). The Encyclopaedia of Islam, Second Edition. Volume II: C–G. Leiden: E. J. Brill. p. 534. doi:10.1163/1573-3912_islam_SIM_2068. OCLC 495469475.
