= Aq Qoyunlu–Mamluk War (1470–1474) =

15th-century conflict between the Aq Qoyunlu and the Mamluk Sultanate

- Part of Aq Qoyunlu–Mamluk Wars
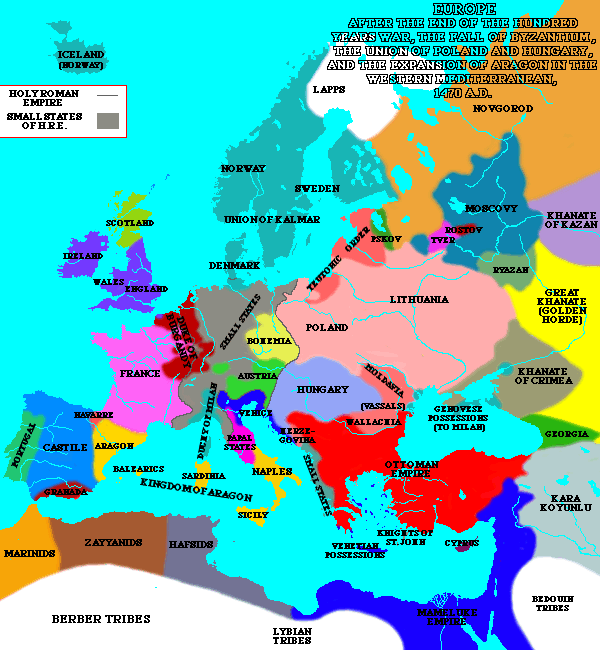
- Map of Mamluks and Aq Qoyunlu in 1470
Date	1470–1474
Location	Levant and Urfa
Result	Mamluk victory • Decline of Aq Qoyunlu

Belligerents
Mamluk Sultanate	Aq Qoyunlu; Dulkadirids: Pahlevanlu tribe

Commanders and leaders
(Mamluk Sultanate) Qaitbay (Mamluk Sultanate) Yashbak min Mahdi (Mamluk Sultanate) Korkmaz (executed)	Uzun Hasan; Ughurlu Muhammad; Zegnel Beg †; Masih Beg † Shah Suwar (executed); Hudadad (POW); Selman (POW) Sarım İbrahim

Strength
Unknown	Unknown

Casualties and losses
Heavy	34,000 killed and wounded 1,380 killed and captured

The Aq Qoyunlu–Mamluk War was a conflict fought between the Aq Qoyunlu confederation and the Mamluk Sultanate from 1470 to 1474. The war was sparked by Aq Qoyunlu raids into Mamluk territories in Syria and Upper Mesopotamia and culminated in a series of battles, including the failed sieges of Bira and Bilecik. The war ended with a decisive Mamluk victory and marked the beginning of Aq Qoyunlu's decline.

== Background ==
The Aq Qoyunlu Turkmen confederation emerged as a major power in Southwest Asian politics during the second half of the 15th century, following the decline of the Ilkhanate. In 1429, Qara Yuluk Uthman Beg, founder of the Aq Qoyunlu dynasty, launched an attack on the Dulkadirids—then vassals of the Mamluk Sultanate—and appointed his son Ali Beg as governor over the conquered region. In response, the Mamluks raided Urfa, capturing both Ali Beg and another Aq Qoyunlu commander, Abul Bey. The Mamluks then proceeded to besiege the Aq Qoyunlu capital. Although the siege ended in a stalemate, Uthman Beg ultimately submitted to Mamluk authority and recognized their suzerainty. During his first decade of rule, Uzun Hasan secured a series of victories against two of his main rivals: Jahan Shah of the Qara Qoyunlu federation and the Timurid ruler of Bukhara. In 1467, the Dulkadirid ruler Shah Suwar revolted against the Mamluks and maintained independence for three years. The weakening of Mamluk influence in the region aroused Uzun Hasan's ambitions to expand towards the Euphrates, leading to a series of raids against Mamluk-held Levantine territories beginning in 1470.

== History ==
The first major raid into Mamluk territory occurred in 1470, when Uzun Hasan led incursions into the Riha (Urfa) region, primarily targeting the town of Bira. However, due to his concurrent campaigns against the Ottoman Empire, Uzun Hasan refrained from launching a full-scale offensive. In 1471, the Mamluks mobilized an army under Emir Yashbak. The force was ambushed by the Pahlevanlu tribe under Sarim Ibrahim—an ally of the Dulkadirids. During the ambush, the Mamluk governor of Malatya, Korkmaz, was captured and subsequently executed. In 1472, Shah Suwar was captured and executed by Yashbak min Mahdi, while his brothers Hudadad and Selman were also taken prisoner. Later that year, Uzun Hasan sent his son Ughurlu Muhammad to besiege Bilecik, but Yashbak quickly defeated him, forcing him to lift the siege. Hearing of his son's defeat, Uzun Hasan personally led a second siege of Bilecik in early 1473. In March, a major battle occurred between the two forces. Despite heavy casualties on both sides, the Aq Qoyunlu army was defeated, and two of Uzun Hasan's sons, Zegnel Beg and Masih Beg, were killed in action. Just five months later, Uzun Hasan suffered another defeat at the hands of the Ottomans in the Battle of Otlukbeli (1473).

== Aftermath ==
The simultaneous defeats suffered by Uzun Hasan—first by Sultan Qaitbay of the Mamluk Sultanate and then by Sultan Mehmed II of the Ottoman Empire—marked the beginning of the decline of the Aq Qoyunlu state. Following Uzun Hasan's death in 1478, the Mamluks planned a renewed offensive against the Aq Qoyunlu. In 1480, the Mamluks launched a major invasion, resulting in the Battle of Urfa (1480). However, the campaign ended in disaster for the Mamluks, as their army was decisively defeated and nearly annihilated.

== See also ==
- Aq Qoyunlu
- Mamluk Sultanate
- Battle of Otlukbeli
- Battle of Urfa (1480)
- Uzun Hasan
- Qaitbay
