= Qazi Isa Savaji =

- Died: 24 January 1491
- Occupation: Bureaucrat
- Years active: 1450s–1491
- Relatives: Shaykh Ali Savaji (brother); Najm al-Din Mas'ud Savaji (nephew)

Qazi Isa Savaji (also spelled Qadi; died 1491) was a Persian bureaucrat from the Savaji family, who was among the leading figures during the reign of the Aq Qoyunlu rulers Uzun Hasan (r. 1453–1478) and Ya'qub Beg (r. 1478–1490).

== Biography ==
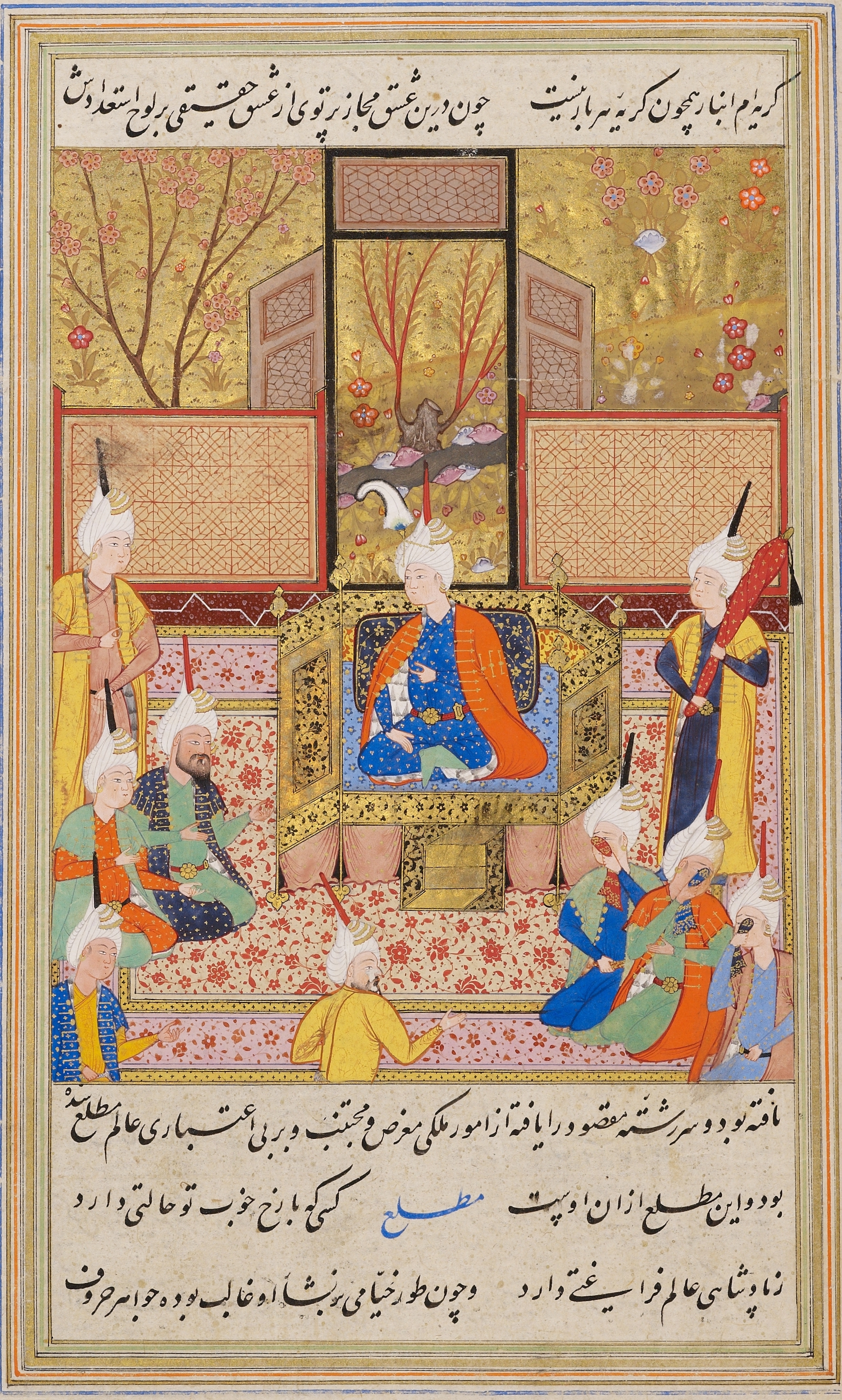
Illustration of Ya'qub Beg surrounded by his court

Qazi Isa was a member of the Savaji family from Persian Iraq (Irāq-i Ajam), a region corresponding to western part of Iran. In his early career, Qazi Isa served as the qadi (chief judge) of Tabriz, the capital city of the Turkmen Aq Qoyunlu. Together with Abu Bakr Tihrani and Amir Zahir al-Din Ibrahim Shah, he was among the leading figures in the court of the Aq Qoyunlu ruler Uzun Hasan (r. 1453–1478). During this period, the prominent scholar Shaykh Ibrahim Gulshani (died 1534) advocated that Qazi Isa should be made the tutor of Uzun Hasan's son Ya'qub Beg. Qazi Isa finally received the position at the accession of Ya'qub Beg in 1478, as well as the office of chief magistrate. During his reign, Ya'qub Beg launched a land reform in order to consolidate his realm, creating a stable government. The Aq Qoyunlu used a political system based on the old iqta' (land grants) which had been in use since the pre-Seljuk period. This system, known as the soyurghal (benefice), had been in use since the time of the Jalayirids. It excluded the owner of an iqta from taxation, and also made him autonomous. The reform was set in motion by Qazi Isa.

The contemporary historian Fazlallah Khunji Isfahani (died 1521) condemned the abolition of the soyurghal, claiming that it had disturbed many of the religious scholars in Shiraz. The Encyclopaedia Islamica considers the truthness of his claim uncertain, stating that; "It must be reiterated that his information on the impact of these reforms mainly refers to Fars, however it is virtually the only contemporary source on the topic and therefore central to any understanding of it. His stance is clearly partisan since the reforms seem to have adversely affected his relatives." By 1489, Qazi Isa had virtually cemented his hold over the Aq Qoyunlu realm along with his cousin Najm al-Din Mas'ud Savaji, who was in the same year appointed amir-i divan (deputy of the sultan). After Ya'qub's death in 24 December 1490, the land reform was cancelled.

At the time of Ya'qub's death, the Turkmen officer Sufi Khalil Beg Mawsilu found himself in a favourable position as the head of the political and military preponderance in the winter quarters of Qarabagh. Supported by his Mawsillu kinsmen, he persuaded the Bayandur and Miranshahi princes to install Ya'qub's nine-year-old son, Baysunghur, on the throne. Now de facto ruler of the realm, Sufi Khalil sought to eliminate the administration of Ya'qub, including Qazi Isa. Sufi Khalil accused Qazi Isa of heresy, which the latter denied. Nevertheless, a few days later (on 24 January 1491), Sufi Khalil had Qazi Isa executed by hanging in the ordu-bazar ("soldiers market"). Qazi Isa's brother Shaykh Ali Savaji, who was enforcing his brothers reforms in Fars, was arrested, tortured and fined in Shiraz by its military governor, Mansur Beg Purnak. He was subsequently moved to Tabriz, where Sufi Khalil had him executed. Qazi Isa's nephew Najm al-Din Mas'ud Savaji managed to escape for a short while, until he was poisoned by Mulla Jan at the instigation of Sufi Khalil.

Not long after Qazi Isa's death, the Savajis shifted their allegiance to the Safavid shah (king) Ismail I (r. 1501–1524), who by 1509 had conquered all of the former Aq Qoyunlu realm.

== Sources ==
- Curry, John J. (2010). Transformation of Muslim Mystical Thought in the Ottoman Empire. Edinburgh University Press. ISBN 978-0748639236.
- Dunietz, Alexandra (2015). The Cosmic Perils of Qadi Ḥusayn Maybudī in Fifteenth-Century Iran. Brill. ISBN 978-9004302310.
- Langaroodi, Reza Rezazadeh; Cooper, John (2008). "Abū Bakr Ṭihrānī". In Madelung, Wilferd; Daftary, Farhad (eds.). Encyclopaedia Islamica Online. Brill Online. ISSN 1875-9831.
- Langaroodi, Reza Rezazadeh; Negahban, Farzin (2008). "Āq-qūyūnlū". In Madelung, Wilferd; Daftary, Farhad (eds.). Encyclopaedia Islamica Online. Brill Online. ISSN 1875-9831.
- Lingwood, Chad (2013). Politics, Poetry, and Sufism in Medieval Iran. Brill. ISBN 978-9004254046.
- Melville, Charles (2020). The Timurid Century: The Idea of Iran Vol.9. University of Cambridge, English: Bloomsbury Publishing. ISBN 9781838606152.
- Minorsky, Vladimir (1955). "The Aq-qoyunlu and Land Reforms". Bulletin of the School of Oriental and African Studies. 17 (3): 449–462. doi:10.1017/S0041977X00112376. JSTOR 609589. S2CID 154166838. (registration required)
- Mitchell, Colin P. (2009). The Practice of Politics in Safavid Iran: Power, Religion and Rhetoric. I.B.Tauris. pp. 1–304. ISBN 978-0857715883.
- Savory, Roger M. (1964). "The Struggle for Supremacy in Persia after the death of Tīmūr". Jahresband. 40. De Gruyter: 35–65. doi:10.1515/islm.1964.40.1.35. S2CID 162340735.
- Quiring-Zoche, R. (1986). "Āq Qoyunlū". Encyclopædia Iranica, online edition, Vol. II, Fasc. 2. New York. pp. 163–168.
- Woods, John E. (1999). The Aqquyunlu: Clan, Confederation, Empire (Revised and Expanded ed.). University of Utah Press. ISBN 978-0874805659.
