= Battle of Khoy =

The Battle of Khoy may refer to:

- Battle of Khoy (1467) - Between Uzun Hassan of Aq Qoyunlu & Jahan Shah of Kara Koyunlu
- Battle of Khoy (1478) - Between Sultan Khalil bin Uzun Hasan of Aq Qoyunlu & Generals Bayandur Beg and Sulayman Beg of Yaqub bin Uzun Hasan of Aq Qoyunlu (Succession Crisis)
