= Baysunghur (Aq Qoyunlu) =

Sultan of the Aq Qoyunlu from 1490 to 1493

- Padishah
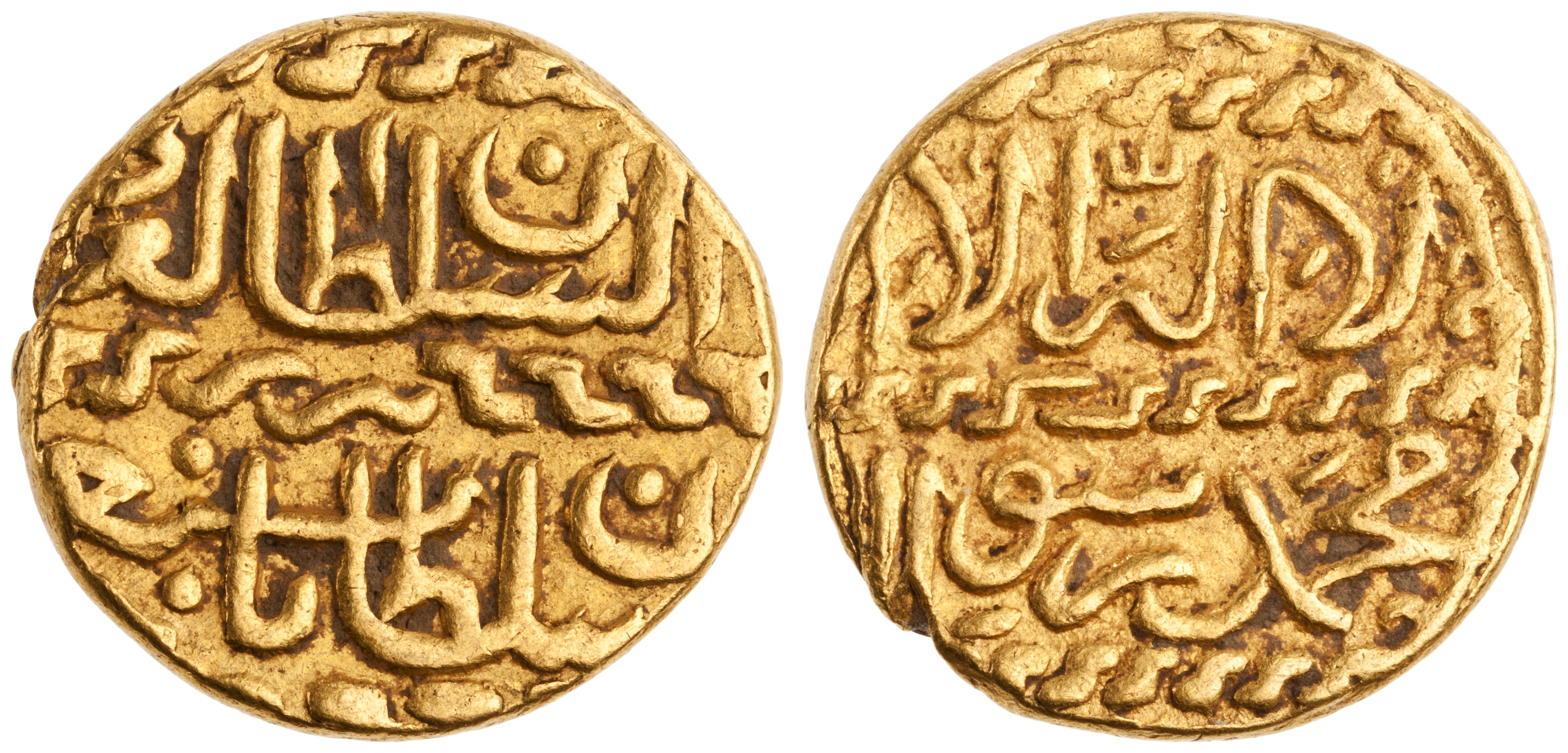
- Gold coin of Baysunghur, Tabriz mint

Sultan of the Aq Qoyunlu
- Reign: 1490–1493
- Predecessor: Ya'qub Beg
- Successor: Rustam Beg
- Died: 1493
- Dynasty: Aq Qoyunlu
- Father: Ya'qub Beg
- Mother: Gawhar-Sultan Khanum
- Religion: Sunni Islam

Baysunghur (Persian: سلطان بایسنقر) was the ruler of the Aq Qoyunlu from 1490 to 1493. He was the son and successor of Ya'qub Beg (r. 1478–1490). He had little power during his short reign, serving as a figurehead, while real power was in possession of his tutor and commander Sufi Khalil Beg Mawsilu in 1490–1492, and then under another commander, Sulayman Beg Bijan in 1492–1493. Baysunghur was killed in 1493 by his cousin Rustam Beg, who succeeded him.

== Background and early life ==
Baysunghur was the eldest son of the Aq Qoyunlu ruler Ya'qub Beg (r. 1478–1490) and Gawhar-Sultan Khanum, the daughter of the Shirvanshah Farrukh Yasar (r. 1465–1500). During the reign of his father, Baysunghur was allocated the funds of the southern Iranian province of Fars, which had received a special status under the Aq Qoyunlu. Furthermore, he was also put under the guardianship of the Turkoman military officer Sufi Khalil Beg Mawsilu, who had been given the governorship of Fars in 1478. Ya'qub became severely ill and died in December 24, 1490 in Qarabagh. A number of scholars believe that he was poisoned by his wife. His death marked the start of the decline of the Aq Qoyunlu.

== Reign ==
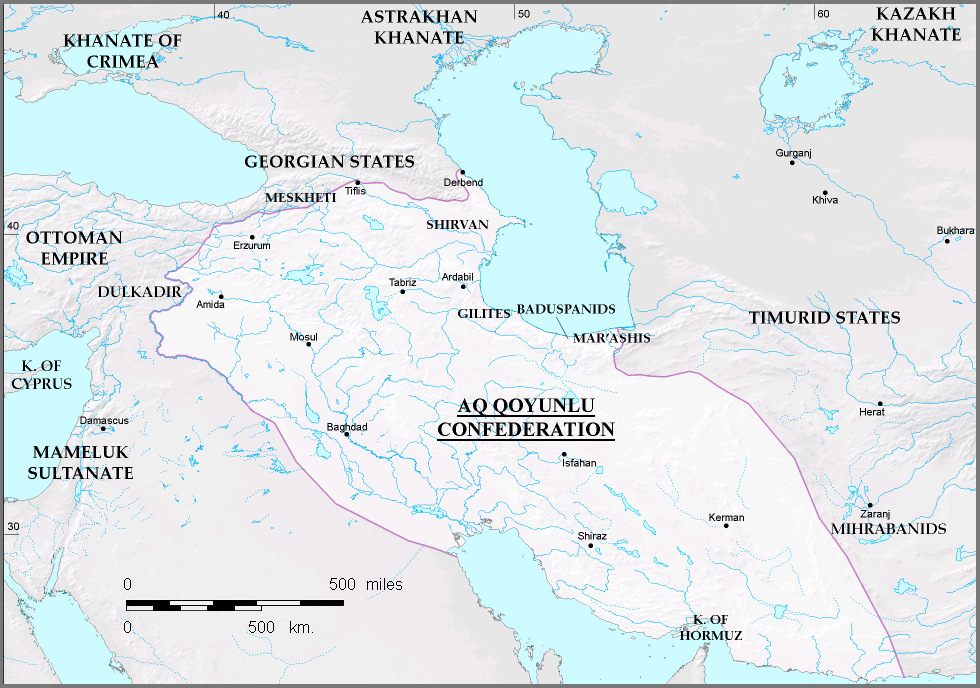
Map of the Aq Qoyunlu realm in 1490

At the time of Ya'qub's death, Sufi Khalil found himself in a favourable position as the head of the political and military preponderance in the winter quarters of Qarabagh. Supported by his Mawsillu kinsmen, he persuaded the Bayandur and Miranshahi princes to install Baysunghur on the throne. Now de facto ruler of the realm, Sufi Khalil had Ya'qub's chief of staff, Mirza Ali ibn Sultan-Khalil, captured and executed. This action alienated the Bayandur and Miranshahi, which led them to revolt against Baysunghur and Sufi Khalil. A bloody battle subsequently ensured in the royal camp, which led to the elimination of the Bayandur princes and officers, including Ya'qub's brother Masih Mirza. Ya'qub's nephew Rustam Beg was captured and imprisoned in the Alinjaq castle near the city of Nakhjavan, while Mahmud ibn Ughurlu Muhammad managed to escape to the province of Arabian Iraq, which was under Purnak control. In order to further consolidate his rule, Sufi Khalil now went against the rest of the administration of Ya'qub, including the powerful bureaucrat Qazi Isa Savaji, whose reforms hurt the economic support that the Turkoman military leaders enjoyed.

Sufi Khalil accused Qazi Isa of heresy, which the latter denied. Nevertheless, a few days later (on 24 January 1491), Sufi Khalil had Qazi Isa executed by hanging in the ordu-bazar ("soldiers market"). Qazi Isa's brother Shaykh Ali Savaji, who was enforcing his brother's reforms in Fars, was arrested, tortured, and fined in Shiraz by its military governor, Mansur Beg Purnak. He was subsequently moved to the capital of Tabriz, where Sufi Khalil had him executed. Qazi Isa's nephew Najm al-Din Mas'ud Savaji managed to escape for a short while, until he was poisoned by Mulla Jan at the instigation of Sufi Khalil. Najm al-Din Mas'ud's father, Mahmud Jan Daylami, escaped the fate of his associates by fleeing to the city of Qazvin. A new administration was then established with Shaykh Muhammad of the Kujuji family as its leading figure. Sufi Khalil had now rid himself of his most potent enemies, conquered all of Azerbaijan, and gained fealty of his brother Bakr Beg, who was at the Khurasan frontier in the east, and his nephew Gulabi Beg who was in Armenia in the west.

However, resistance against Sufi Khalil continued. In the city of Hamadan, Shah-Ali Beg Purnak, who had served as the governor of Arabian Iraq for a long time under Ya'qub, declared the Aq Qoyunlu prince Mahmud ibn Ughurlu Muhammad as sultan. Mahmud then sent a letter to Tabriz, evoking the accomplishments of his father: "Hasan-Ali Qara Qoyunlu was killed and Iraq conquered by my father's sword. I am his son and Sufi Khalil should recognize my rights. Both sides will be best served if Diyar Bakr and Azerbaijan are taken by Baysunghur while I retain Iraq and Fars." Sufi Khalil was against this suggestion, and declared war against Mahmud. A battle soon took place near the town of Darguzin, where the forces of Mahmud and Shah-Ali Beg Purnak were routed, with the latter killed, while Mahmud was captured and executed. Mansur Beg Purnak had initially backed his kinsman Shah-Ali Beg Purnak against Sufi Khalil and Baysunghur, but had now reconciled with them. He later quelled a revolt in the city of Yazd by Qayitmas Bayandur (a cousin of Ya'qub), whose head was sent to Tabriz. Following this, Sufi Khalil's authority extended over Arabian Iraq, Persian Iraq, and Fars.

Sufi Khalil was also opposed by Sulayman Beg Bijan in Diyar Bakr, a long-time rival of his, who was the guardian, father-in-law, and former chief of staff of Ya'qub. In the early spring of 1491, Sulayman Beg defeated Gulabi Beg, and in mid-summer, he approached Sufi Khalil. After a prolonged skirmish, Sufi Khalil and his men withdrew to Tabriz, but were vanquished en route by Sulayman Beg's forces 29 July 1491, resulting in the death of Sufi Khalil and his brother Bakr Beg. Suleyman Beg kept Baysunghur in power, taking Sufi Khalil's place as the real leader of the realm.

In May 1492, Baysunghur was expelled from Tabriz by his cousin Rustam Beg, who had the support of the Purnak and Qajar tribes led by Ayba Sultan. After several unsuccessful attempts to recapture Tabriz, Baysunghur was killed in 1493.

== Sources ==
- Dunietz, Alexandra (2015). The Cosmic Perils of Qadi Ḥusayn Maybudī in Fifteenth-Century Iran. Brill. ISBN 978-9004302310.
- Langaroodi, Reza Rezazadeh; Negahban, Farzin (2008). "Āq-qūyūnlū". In Madelung, Wilferd; Daftary, Farhad (eds.). Encyclopaedia Islamica Online. Brill Online. ISSN 1875-9831.
- Markiewicz, Christopher (2019). The Crisis of Kingship in Late Medieval Islam: Persian Emigres and the Making of Ottoman Sovereignty. Cambridge University Press.
- Minorsky, Vladimir (1955). "The Aq-qoyunlu and Land Reforms". Bulletin of the School of Oriental and African Studies. 17 (3): 449–462. doi:10.1017/S0041977X00112376. JSTOR 609589. S2CID 154166838. (registration required)
- Quiring-Zoche, R. (1986). "Āq Qoyunlū". Encyclopædia Iranica, online edition, Vol. II, Fasc. 2. New York. pp. 163–168.
- Woods, John E. (1999). The Aqquyunlu: Clan, Confederation, Empire (Revised and Expanded ed.). University of Utah Press. ISBN 978-0874805659.
