= Yaqub Aq Qoyunlu =

Sultan of the Aq Qoyunlu from 1478 to 1490

Ya'qub Beg
- Padishah
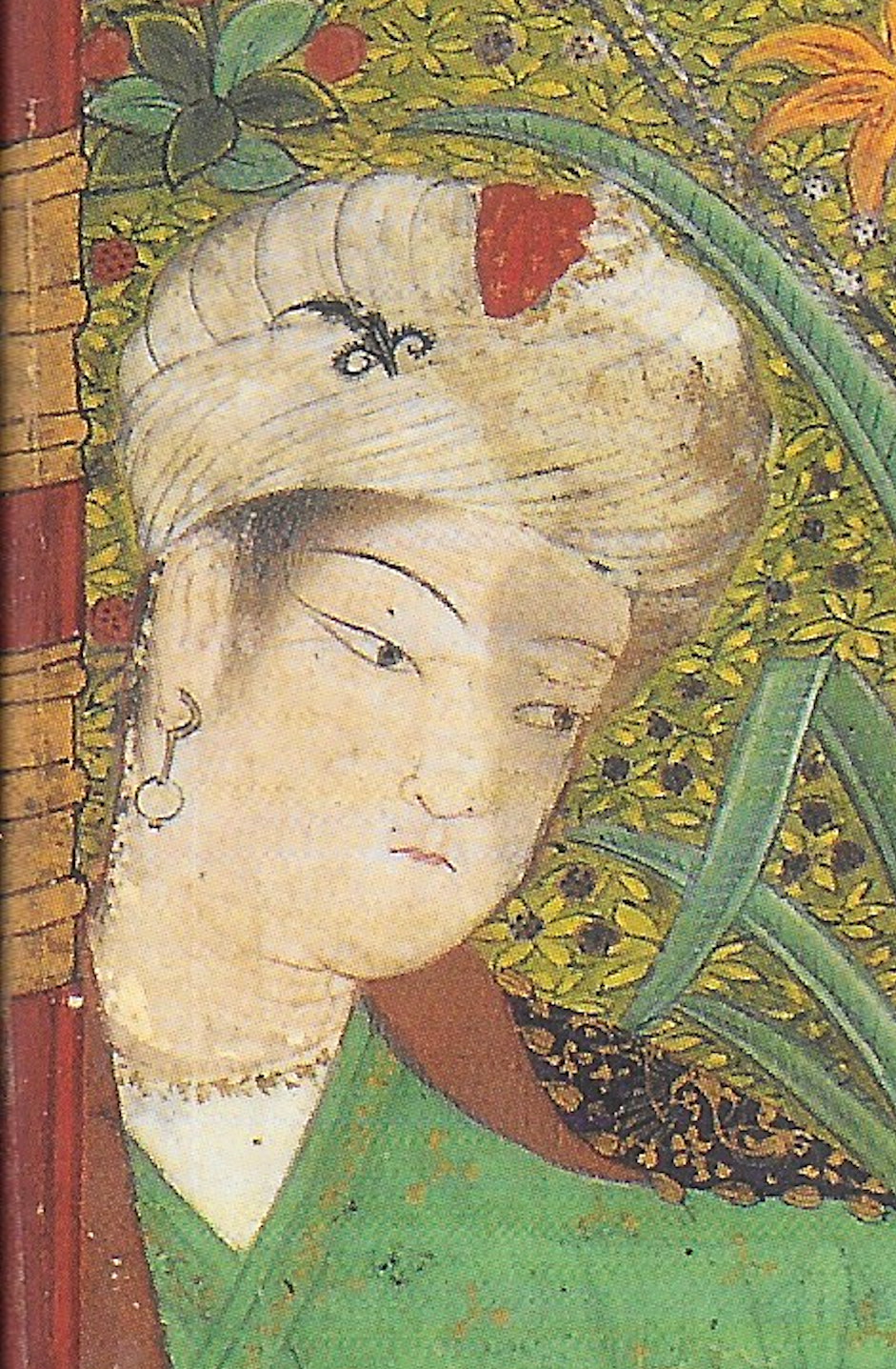
- Contemporary portrait of Sultan Yaqub, painted in 1478–90 in Tabriz.

Sultan/Padishah of the Ağqoyunlu Empire
- Reign: 1478 – 24 December 1490
- Predecessor: Sultan Khalil
- Successor: Baysunghur
- Died: 24 December 1490; Karabakh
- Spouse: Gawhar-Sultan Khanum; Begijan Khatun
- Issue: Baysunghur Beg; Hasan Beg; Murad Beg; A daughter
Names
- Abū al-Muẓaffar Yaʿqūb Bahādur Ḫān
- Dynasty: Aq Qoyunlu
- Father: Uzun Hasan
- Mother: Seljuk Shah Begum
- Religion: Sunni Islam

Yaqub b. Uzun Hasan (Persian: یعقوب بن اوزون حسن), commonly known as Sultan Yaqub (Persian: سلطان یعقوب; Azerbaijani: Sultan Yaqub سلطان یعقوب) was the ruler of the Aq Qoyunlu from 1478 until his death on 24 December 1490. A son of Uzun Hasan, he became the ruler of the dynasty after the death of his brother Sultan Khalil. The borders of the Aq Qoyunlu dynasty remained stable during his reign. In his book Tarikh-i Alam-ara-yi Amini, Fazlallah Khunji Isfahani praised him as a decent successor of Uzun Hasan. Ya'qub received praise from other historians for supporting poets and scientists.

== Origins ==
Yaqub Beg was the son of Uzun Hasan and Seljuk Shah Begum, a daughter of Kur Muhammad Bayandur. He had an older full brother, Khalil Mirza Beg, and a younger full brother, Yusuf Beg. On 6 January 1478, his father died and his brother Khalil proclaimed himself sultan. He exiled both of his brothers and killed his half-brother Maqsud Beg, son of Despina Khatun, a Byzantine princess. Another half-brother, Ughurlu Muhammad, whose mother was a daughter of Dawlatshah Beg Bulduqani-Mardasi, escaped to Constantinople, to the court of the Ottoman Sultan Mehmed II, where he married his daughter Gevherhan Hatun. This caused civil war to break out between Khalil and his family. On 15 June 1478, Yaqub defeated his brother, executed him and proclaimed himself the new sultan.

== Reign ==
At the outset of his reign, Ya'qub faced a revolt from the Bayandur princes Alwand Beg and Kusa Haji in Shiraz and Isfahan respectively, but both revolts were crushed. The biggest revolt during his reign was that of Shaykh Haydar, the father of Ismail I, which resulted in the death of Haydar. In 1480, Qaitbay, the Mamluk sultan of Egypt, sent an army under his commander Yashbak al-Zahiri to invade Diyar Bakr. Ya'qub consequently sent an army under Bayindir Beg, Sulayman Beg Bijan and Sufi Khalil Beg Mawsilu to counter the army. The two forces clashed in November of the same year, which resulted in an Aq Qoyunlu triumph and capture of Yashbak al-Zahiri, who was executed a few days later. In the same year, Ya'qub's forces defeated and killed Balish Beg, the commander-in-chief of Syria, who had attempted to conquer Diyar Bakr.

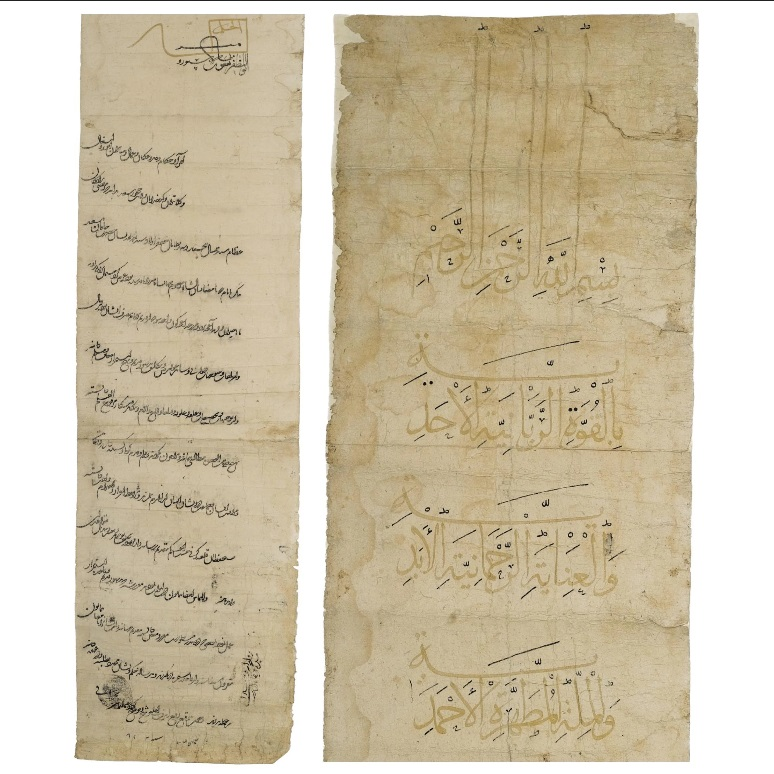
Firman of Ya'qub concerning land rights given previously by the deceased Qara Qoyunlu ruler Jahan Shah to two sons of Sayyid Ni'matullah. Created in Iran

Under Ya'qub, the realm remained the same size as that of his father, and the institutions of the realm were strengthened. He retained the same ranks and land-grants that his subjects had received from his father. He did, however, launch a land reform in order to consolidate his realm, creating a stable government. The Aq Qoyunlu used a political system based on the old iqta' (land grants) which had been in use since the pre-Seljuk period. This system, known as the soyurghal (benefice), had been in use since the time of the Jalayirid Sultanate. It excluded the owner of an iqta from taxation, and also made him autonomous. The reform was set in motion by Ya'qub's tutor and wakil Qazi Isa Savaji.

The religious scholar and historian Fazlallah Khunji Isfahani (died 1521) condemned the abolition of the soyurghal, claiming that it had disturbed many of the religious scholars in Shiraz. The Encyclopaedia Islamica considers the truthfulness of his claim uncertain, stating that: "It must be reiterated that his information on the impact of these reforms mainly refers to Fars, however it is virtually the only contemporary source on the topic and therefore central to any understanding of it. His stance is clearly partisan since the reforms seem to have adversely affected his relatives." The qadi (chief judge) of Fars, Jalal al-Din Davani (died 1502), also opposed the reforms of Ya'qub, which worsened their relations. Together with Abu-Yazid al-Davani and Maulana Muhammad al-Muhyavi, Davani sent letters to Qazi Isa Savaji to protest these reforms. After Ya'qub's death, the land reform was cancelled.

Ya'qub became severely ill and died on 24 December 1490 in Karabakh. A number of scholars believe that he was poisoned by his wife. The leading figures of the confederation installed his eight-year-old son Baysunghur on the throne to increase their own power. This marked the start of the decline of the Aq Qoyunlu.

== Imperial ideology ==
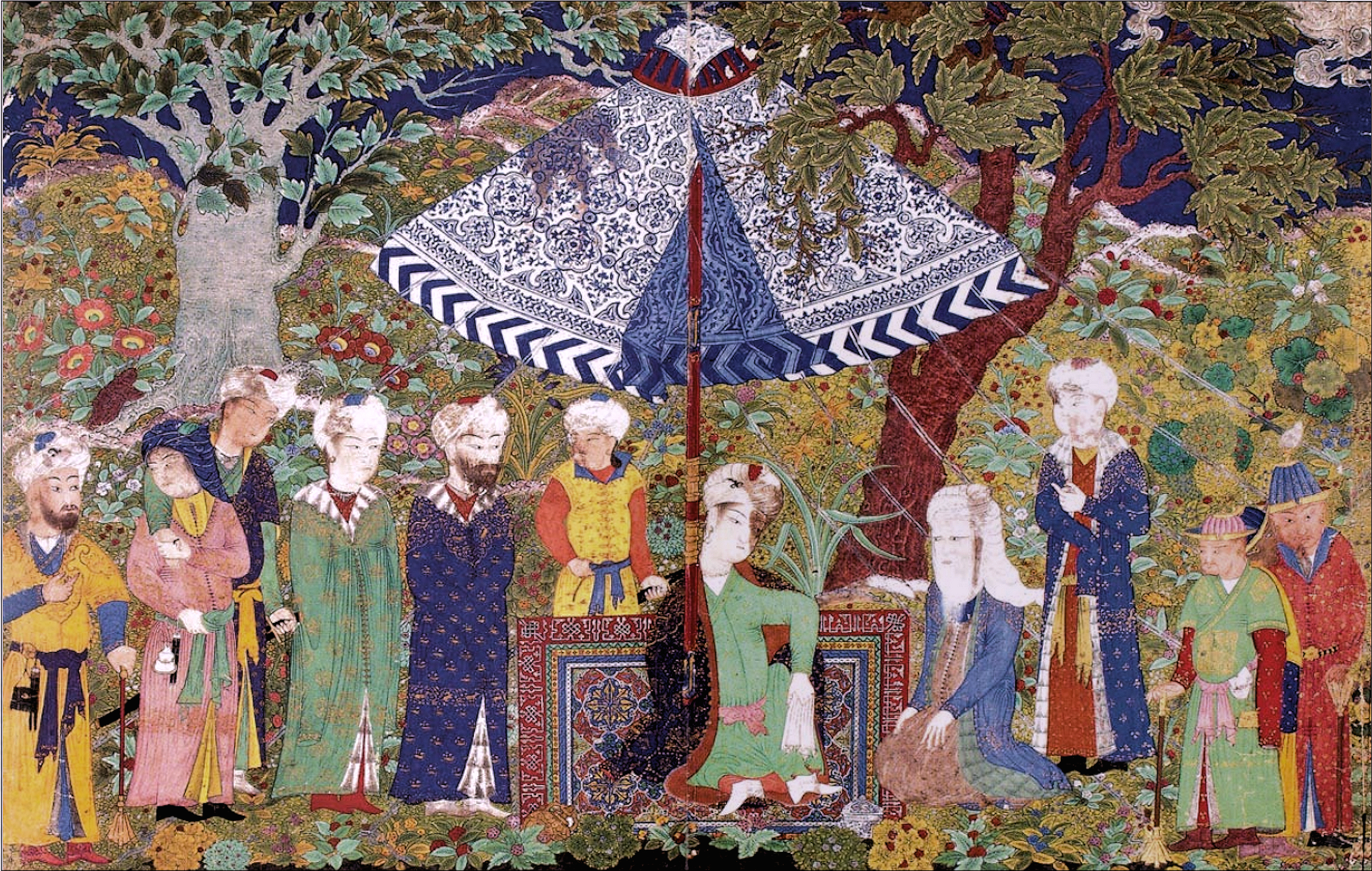
Contemporary depiction of Yaqub-bey and his court. Shahnameh (Fateh's Album) Tabriz c. 1470–80.

The Aq Qoyunlu displayed their legitimacy by rebuilding ruined Ilkhanate buildings, including the palace of Ujan near Tabriz, originally founded by Ghazan (r. 1295–1304). By including areas which had represented kingship in their court ceremonials, the Aq Qoyunlu were to use the customs of their predecessors, in order to strengthen their own kingship. This practice had been adopted from the Ilkhanate themselves, who rebuilt Sasanian buildings, notably the palace of Shiz (Takht-e Soleymān). Aq Qoyunlu historiography represents Ya'qub hunting around the palace of Ujan in the same manner as the Sasanian monarch Bahram V (r. 420–438).

== Family ==
Yaqub Beg had two known consorts. Gawhar-Sultan Khanum, daughter of the Shirvanshah Farrukh Yasar, was the mother of Baysunghur Beg and Sultan Murad. Begijan Khatun, daughter of Sulayman Beg Bijan, was the mother of Hasan Beg. His known children included:

- Baysunghur Beg
- Hasan Beg
- Murad Beg
- A daughter, mother of Tajlu Khanum and grandmother of Shah Tahmasp I.

== Literature ==
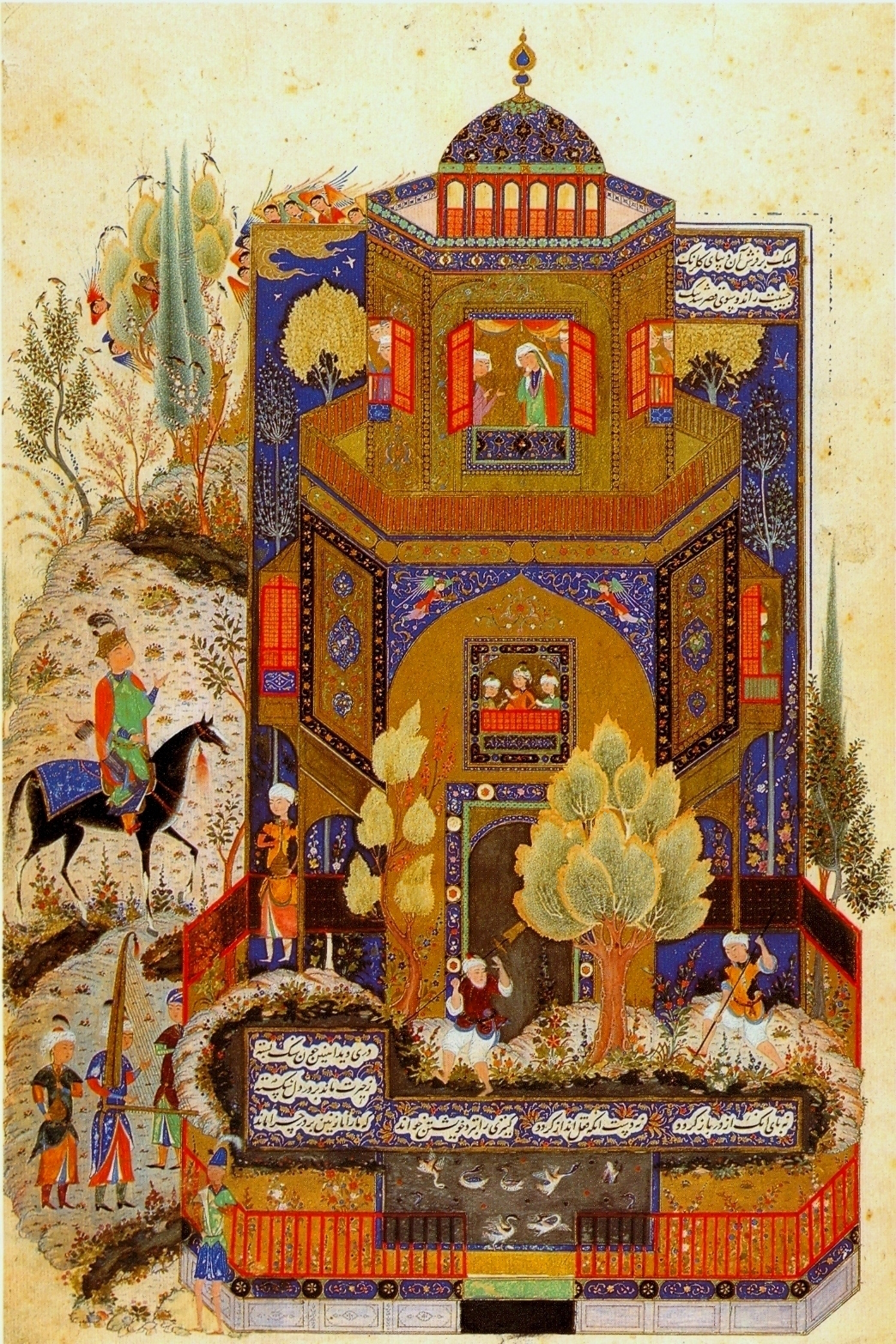
The Hasht Behesht Palace in Tabriz, started by Uzun Hasan, was completed by his son Yaqub Beg. Khamsa of Nizami (Tabriz, 1481), commissioned by Yaqub Beg.

Ya'qub's court included several distinguished poets, such as Baba Fighani Shirazi, Ahli Shirazi, Kamal al-Din Bana'i Haravi, and Shahidi Qumi. Another distinguished poet, Hatefi, who was a nephew of the poet Jami, spent five years at Ya'qub's court. Khatai Tabrizi, an Azeri poet of the 15th century, dedicated a mathnawi entitled Yusof wa Zoleykha to Sultan Ya'qub, and Ya'qub even wrote poetry in the Azerbaijani language. Baba Fighani Shirazi dedicated a ceremonial ode (qasida) to Ya'qub, and also a eulogy after the latter's death.

== Sources ==
- Dunietz, Alexandra (2015). The Cosmic Perils of Qadi Ḥusayn Maybudī in Fifteenth-Century Iran. Brill. ISBN 978-9004302310.
- Langaroodi, Reza Rezazadeh; Negahban, Farzin (2015). "Āq-qūyūnlū". In Madelung, Wilferd; Daftary, Farhad (eds.). Encyclopaedia Islamica Online. Brill Online. ISSN 1875-9831.
- Leube, Georg (2018). "Aqquyunlu Turkmen Rulers Facing the Ruins of Takht-i Jamshīd" (PDF). Der Islam. 95 (2). De Gruyter: 479–506. doi:10.1515/islam-2018-0031. S2CID 166087209.
- Lingwood, Chad (2013). Politics, Poetry, and Sufism in Medieval Iran: New Perspectives on Jāmī's Salāmān va Absāl. Brill. ISBN 978-9004254046.
- Losensky, Paul E. (2020). "Fighānī Shīrāzī, Bābā". In Fleet, Kate; Krämer, Gudrun; Matringe, Denis; Nawas, John; Rowson, Everett (eds.). Encyclopaedia of Islam (3rd ed.). Brill Online. ISSN 1873-9830.
- Minorsky, Vladimir (1955). "The Aq-qoyunlu and Land Reforms". Bulletin of the School of Oriental and African Studies. 17 (3): 449–462. doi:10.1017/S0041977X00112376. JSTOR 609589. S2CID 154166838. (registration required)
- Javadi, H.; Burrill, K. (24 May 2012). "AZERBAIJAN x. Azeri Turkish Literature". Encyclopaedia Iranica.
- Pourjavady, Reza (2011). Philosophy in Early Safavid Iran. Brill. ISBN 978-9004191730.
- Quiring-Zoche, R. (1986). "Āq Qoyunlū". Encyclopædia Iranica, online edition, Vol. II, Fasc. 2. New York. pp. 163–168.
- Woods, John E. (1999). The Aqquyunlu: Clan, Confederation, Empire (Rev. and expanded ed.). Salt Lake City: University of Utah Press. ISBN 0-87480-565-1.
