= Battle of Urfa (1480) =

Battle between Aq Qoyunlu and the Mamluks

Battle of Urfa 1480
- Part of Mamluk Sultanate invasion of Diyarbakır
Date	August 1480
Location	Urfa (present-day Turkey)
Result	Aq Qoyunlu victory

Belligerents
Aq Qoyunlu	Mamluk Sultanate

Commanders and leaders
Sultan Yaqub; Bayindir Beg; Sulayman Beg Bijan; Sufi Khalil Beg Mawsilu	(Mamluk Sultanate) Yashbak min Mahdi (executed) (Mamluk Sultanate) Gansu Yakhyavi (POW) (Mamluk Sultanate) Ozdemir (POW) (Mamluk Sultanate) Suleiman Bey † (Mamluk Sultanate) Toktamish al-Khushqadami † (Mamluk Sultanate) Suzar al-Ashrafi † (Mamluk Sultanate) Berdibek † (Mamluk Sultanate) Janibek †

Strength
40,000	(Mamluk Sultanate) 10,000–100,000

The Battle of Urfa took place between Aq Qoyunlu and the Mamluk Sultanate in August 1480 at Urfa in Diyar Bakr (modern-day Turkey). The reason was the invasion of the Mamluks into the territory of Aq Qoyunlu to capture Urfa.

== Background and battle ==
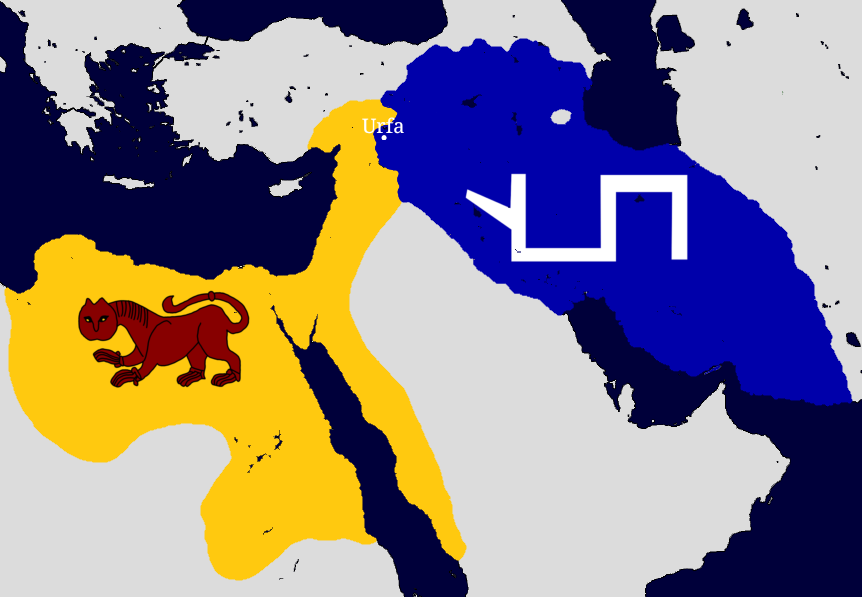
Battle of Urfa (1480)

The Mamluk Sultanate was one of the external threats of Aq Qoyunlu, whose ruler was Sultan Ya'qub Beg. The Mamluk sultan, Qaitbay, took the advantage of the death of Aq Qoyunlu's previous sultan, Uzun Hasan, and sent an army led by Pecheneg commander Yashbak al-Zahiri to invade Diyar Bakr. al-Zahiri, in 1480, crossed the Euphrates River and began the siege of Urfa. Sultan Ya'qub was soon informed about this and sent an army under the command of Bayindir Beg, Sulayman Beg Bijan, and Sufi Khalil Beg Mawsilu to protect Urfa. The Mamluk soldiers, who learned about the approach of the Aq Qoyunlu's troops, advised al-Zahiri to retreat, but he did not listen to them. Thus, the Mamluk army appeared before the Aq Qoyunlu army. The right side of the Mamluk army was commanded by Gansu Yakhyavi (the head of Damascus), the left side was commanded by Ozdemir (the Head of Aleppo) and the central side of the army was commanded by al-Zahiri. The battle ended with the victory of Aq Qoyunlu, during which the Mamluk troops were completely defeated. al-Zahiri, Gansu Yakhyavi and Ozdemir were taken prisoners. al-Zahiri was executed and his head was sent to Sultan Ya'qub. The Mamluk Sultanate, after this battle, received a heavy blow, and after the loss of the commanders of the troops, the state was greatly weakened.

Among the casualties were the Tripoli deputy Berdibek, one of emirs of ten Janibek, the skilled archer Suzar al-Ashrafi, Amir of Aleppo Toktamish al-Khushqadami, and Suleiman Bey, a relative of Shah Suwar.

== Sources ==
- Tofiq Nəcəfli (2000). Qaraqoyunlu və Ağqoyunlu dövlətlərinin tarixi müasir türk tarixşünaslığında. Baku: Çaşıoğlu.
- Vladimir Minorsky (1957). An abridge translation of Fadlullah b. Ruzbihan Khunji's Tarikh-ı 'Alam-Ârâ-yı Aminî. London.
- John E. Woods (translate: Sibel Özbudun) (1993). 300 Yıllık Türk İmparatorluğu Akkoyunlular, Aşiret, Konfederasyon, İmparatorluk. İstanbul: Milliyet.
- Faruk Sümer (1965). Çukurova Tarihine Dair Araştırmalar. Ankara: Tarih Araştırmaları Dergisi.
- Muhammed bin Ahmed İbn İlyâs (1982). Bedâyiü'z -Zuhûr fî Vekâyi'i'd-Duhûr. Cairo: Tahkik.
- Faruk Sümer (1989). Akkoyunlular. İstanbul: Diyanet Islam Araştırmaları.
- İsmail Hakkı Uzunçarşılı, Anadolu Beylikleri ve Akkoyunlu ve Karakoyunlu Devletleri (1988). Anadolu Beylikleri ve Akkoyunlu ve Karakoyunlu Devletleri. Ankara.
