= Battle of Khoy (1478) =

First throne dispute in Aqqoyunlu

- Part of Aqqoyunlu Throne Wars
Date	August 14, 1478
Location	near Khoy
Result	Yaqub's victory

Belligerents
Khalil's forces	Yaqub's forces

Commanders and leaders
Shahzada Khalil (executed); Osman Bey Miranshah; Shahali Bey Pornak; Sufi Khalil Bey	Shahzada Yaqub; Omar Bey Cagirlu; Yusuf Bey; Khurshid Bey; Mansur Bey Chagani; Suleyman Bey; Bahram Bey Bayrami; Iskander Bey Piltan; Mahmud Bey; Bayandur Bey; Hasan Agha Chalabioglu; Yusuf Bey Tevachi; Maqsud Bey

Strength
Unknown	Unknown

Casualties and losses
Unknown	Unknown

The Battle of Khoy is considered to be the decisive battle between the sons of Uzun Hasan, Sultan Khalil and Sultan Yaqub, which ended the battle for the throne on August 14, 1478. Although the battle began with the victory of Sultan Khalil, it ended with the victory of Sultan Yaqub and Sultan Khalil was killed. After entering Tabriz, Sultan Yaqub decided to pardon most of Khalil's supporters.

== Background ==
After the death of Uzun Hasan in 1478, his eldest son Sultan Khalil soon arrived in Tabriz, delivered a khutbah in his name, struck a coin and was proclaimed ruler.

When Sultan Khalil came to power, he started a war with his brothers. He killed his brother Magsud and sent his other brothers, Jacob and Joseph, into exile. In the same year, his uncle Murad bey defeated Bayanduru and began to centralize power. The Turkoman emirs were dissatisfied with his policy of centralization.

In a short time, Sultan Khalil's opponents began to gather in Diyarbakir. Under the leadership of Yaqub Bey, the great Aq Qoyunlu commanders, Bayandur Bey, Suleyman Bey and the great cleric Gazi Isa Bey united to form a front against Sultan Khalil. Concerned about this situation, Sultan Khalil began to act against Yaqub Bey.

== Battle ==
The two armies came face to face near the Khoy River. Yaqub Bey's right flank was led by Suleyman bey Bijanoglu, Bahram bey Bayrami, Iskander bey Pilten, and Mahmud bey. Its left wing was led by Bayandur bey, Hasan agha Chalabioglu, Yusif bey Tavachin and Magsud bey. In the center stood Sultan Yagub himself and Omar bey Cagirlu, Mansur bey Chagani, Yusif bey, Khurshid bey. Sultan Khalil's army was led by Osman bey Miranshahi, Shahali bey Pornak and Sufi Khalil. Sultan Khalil was in the center. The following is written about the battle in the history of Qizilbash:

"On Wednesday, the 14th of the month of Rabi'ulahir, 883 (15.VII.1478), at lunch, a battle took place between two brothers on the banks of the Khoy River. Bayandur Bey's house was seized and looted. Suddenly, fate turned upside down and the Sultan (Khalili) was torn to pieces on horseback, and Yaqub Bey was victorious. "

As it is written in the history of Qizilbash, the advantage in the battle was completely in the hands of Sultan Khalil's army. Sultan Yaqub's commander Bayandur Bey's tent was captured by Sultan Khalil's army. Suleyman bey and Shahram bey Bayrami's son Bahram bey were also captured. The right flank of Jacob's army was completely destroyed.However, Sultan Khalil, who accidentally confused his military center with the center of Yagub Bey, unknowingly moved quickly to the center of Yagub Bey with little force. Realizing this late, Sultan Khalil was forced to fight and was besieged. Unable to escape the siege, Sultan Khalil was killed by Sheykhali bey Mohurdari and Baslamish bey Amirakhur. Upon learning of Khalil's death, his army began to flee and disbanded. Yaqub Bey, who entered Tabriz in September 1478, was proclaimed sultan.
