= Tarikh-i Alam-ara-yi Amini =

Persian history of the Aq Qoyunlu

Tarīkh-i ʿĀlam-ārā-yi Amīnī (Persian: عالم آرای امینی) is a Persian book on the history of Aq Qoyunlu confederation written by Fazl b. Ruzbihan Khunji. It was composed after the major eastwards expansion of the Aq Qoyunlu, and was completed before 1493.

The book was dedicated to Baysunghur. It was translated in modern times by Vladimir Minorsky into English. Minorsky highly praised the author for his neutrality. The book is one of the few primary sources on the history of Aq Qoyunlu dynasty and in particular, it contains valuable information about the reigns of Sultan Ya'qub, Sultan Khalil and Uzun Hasan.
