= Seljuk Shah Begum =

- Mahd-e Olyā

Queen mother of the Aq Qoyunlu
- Tenure: 6 January 1478–12 November 1490
- Predecessor: Sara Khatun
- Successor: Gawhar-Sultan Khanum

Consort of the Aq Qoyunlu sultan
- Tenure: ?–6 January 1478
- Died: 12 November 1490; Karabakh, Aq Qoyunlu
- Spouse: Uzun Hasan
- Issue: Sultan Khalil; Ya'qub Beg
- Dynasty: Aq Qoyunlu

Seljuk Shah Begum was one of the most powerful and influential women of the Aq Qoyunlu in present-day eastern Turkey. As the wife of King Uzun Hasan and mother of Sultan Khalil and Yaqub Aq Qoyunlu, she excelled in governance and state affairs, standing out among the women of her era. Whether during Uzun Hasan's lifetime or during her son Yaqub's reign, she wielded significant influence in matters of the state.

Khanji describes her as follows: “Even if there were a hundred queens like Bilqis (the Queen of Sheba), they would fall short compared to her chastity, and even a powerful and renowned woman like Turkan Khatun would not be worthy of serving her. Even if thousands were to harvest in her charitable fields, there would still be room.” This means she was extremely generous in giving alms and helping others.

Seljuk Shah excelled in governance and state affairs, standing out among the women of her era. Beyond her loyalty to her husband, Uzun Hasan, she was highly attentive to the reputation and prestige of the Aq Qoyunlu and had no desire to see their realm fragmented. She even denied her own son permission to act in ways that might have caused division. Seljuk Shah never had a good relationship with Despina Khatun, the Christian wife of Uzun Hasan.

== Queen consort ==
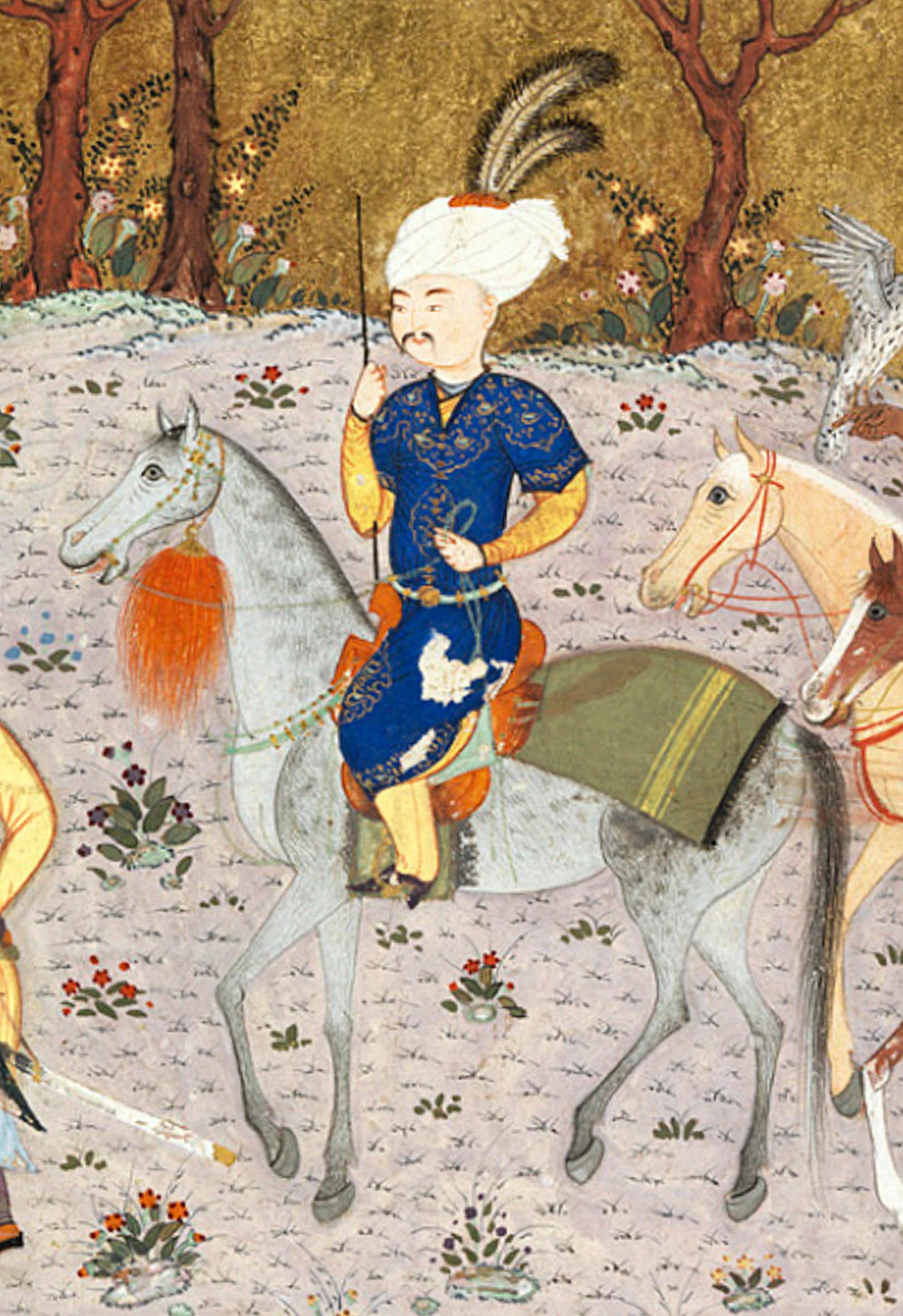
Contemporary depiction of Sultan Khalil, son of Seljuk Shah Begum, in a miniature from the manuscript of Divan of Hidayat (1478).

Seljuk Shah Begum, the wife of Uzun Hasan, was a highly influential and capable woman, constantly involved in state affairs and widely recognized for her influence. Until her death in 894 AH, she enjoyed great prestige and authority in social and political matters. Seljuk Shah Begum played a significant role in resolving the political issues of Uzun Hasan's era and was actively influential in the political developments of her time.

During Uzun Hasan's reign, she held serious political influence. Her orders were carried out throughout the realm, and the emirs and nobles accepted and obeyed her commands. In the administration of the government and the monarchy, she possessed a wise judgment and strong political acumen, to the extent that the execution of certain state affairs depended on her counsel and approval.

Seljuk Shah Begum, who was also the favored wife of the king, played a key role in sidelining Oghurlu Muhammad, another wife of Uzun Hasan, and in securing the throne for her son, Khalil Mirza. Oghurlu Muhammad, the son of Uzun Hasan by his Kurdish wife and the daughter of Dawlatshah Beg, sent a message to his father suggesting that it would be best to defeat Sultan Muhammad together with the troops that very day. Seljuk Shah Begum, as the mother of Sultan Khalil and her other children, persuaded the king by highlighting that Oghurlu Muhammad claimed credit for the Ottoman army's defeat in order to gain prestige among the soldiers. Uzun Hasan accepted her counsel and summoned his son Oghurlu Muhammad to his presence.

The roots of the conflict between Oghurlu Muhammad, the governor of Shiraz, and his father lay in the intrigues of Seljuk Shah Begum, the mother of Khalil Mirza, who was making exhausting efforts to secure the succession for her son. Seljuk Begum spoke so extensively against Oghurlu Muhammad to her husband that Uzun Hasan grew cold toward his son and even put his life at risk. Since Oghurlu Muhammad failed to achieve his goal, he sought refuge with the Ottomans, which caused Uzun Hasan to become deeply suspicious and distrustful.

Mehmed the Conqueror received him graciously and sought to retaliate for what Uzun Hasan had done against the Karamanids. He married his daughter, Gevherhan Hatun, to him and appointed him as the governor of Sivas, sending him to the frontier. Uzun Hasan was furious that his son had taken refuge in enemy territory and sought, by any means, to eliminate him. It is not unlikely that the intrigues and instigations of Seljuk Shah Begum spurred the king to this action. Oghurlu Muhammad's position at the frontier stood in the way of Seljuk Shah Begum's ambitions; therefore, she lured him with promises of governance, deceived him, and drew him out of Sivas. Upon his arrival in Erzincan, he was captured and an order was issued for his execution.

Regarding the death of Uzun Hasan, Rumlu speculates that he may have been killed by his wife, Seljuk Shah Begum, while he was ill. He writes: “When Oghurlu Muhammad's head was brought to Uzun Hasan, he was already sick. It weighed heavily on his mind, and he said that if he recovered from this illness, he would take revenge on his killers.” Fearing his words, Seljuk Shah Begum allegedly strangled him.

== Queen mother ==
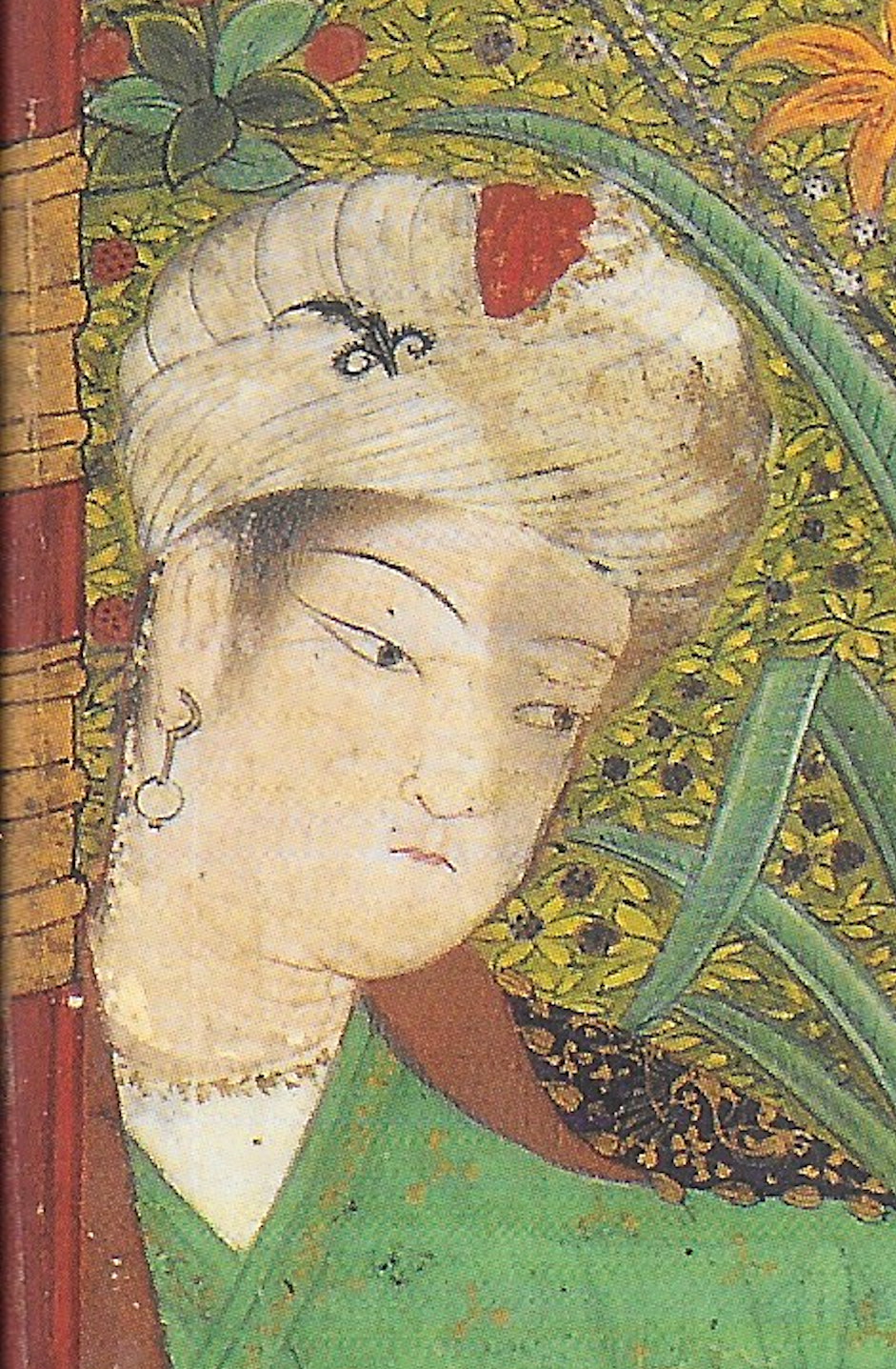
Contemporary portrait of Yaqub, son of Seljuk Shah Begum, painted in 1478-90 in Tabriz.

Seljuk Shah Begum wielded considerable influence at all times. When the kingship passed to Sultan Khalil, he sent his mother along with her brothers from Tabriz to Diyarbakir to preserve the independence of his reign and to prevent his mother from interfering in state affairs.

After Sultan Khalil's death and Sultan Yaqub's accession to the throne, the power of Mahd Aliya reached its peak: her authority extended to the highest levels of influence, and her fame spread across the world. The King of Egypt addressed her as “sister” and took pride in this title, while the Ottoman ruler called her “mother.” Every envoy or ambassador who arrived at the court also carried a message for Mahd Aliya, meaning she had a separate diplomatic channel and an independent center of power. No ruler sent gifts to the Shah without also seeking favor and blessing through her. This demonstrates that Mahd Aliya was a fully political and powerful “queen mother,” not merely a secluded religious woman.

== Death and legacy ==
Seljuk shah Begum died in Karabakh on 12 November 1490. Several versions exist regarding the cause of her death. The first is that she contracted the plague epidemic was spreading in Tabriz at that time. The strongest factor supporting this version its her sons, Sultan Yaqub and Yusuf Mirza, also died suddenly around this time. Moreover, before arriving in Karabakh to spend the winter, Seljuk shah Begum and her sons had visited the city of Tabriz, where they inspected patients afflicted with the plague.

Seljuk Shah Begum was very active in charitable works and religious affairs. The Grand Jameh Mosque of Tabriz was nearly in ruins and on the verge of being forgotten. Mahd Aliya spent a great deal of her wealth to restore the mosque and constructed a huge and very tall dome over the old qibla. She adorned the dome and arches with exquisite turquoise tiles, each piece described as the “envy of the turquoise sky,” inscribed with Quranic verses and hadiths such as “Whoever builds a mosque for God, God will build a house for him in Paradise” and “Only those who believe in God and the Day of Judgment restore God's mosques,” demonstrating the religious significance and profound meaning she attributed to this act. She also composed several verses praising the mosque and its dome, portraying its dome as equal to the sky and likening it to the “Bait al-Ma’mur of Tabriz.”
