= Fazlallah Khunji Isfahani =

Iranian scientist (1455–1521)

- فضل الله خنجی اصفهانی
- Born: 1455; Shiraz, Fars province
- Died: 1521 (aged 65–66); Transoxiana
- Occupations: Historian, Religious Scholar, Political Writer

Academic work
- Era: 15th-16th century
- Notable works: Tarikh-i Alam-ara-yi Amini, Mihman-Nama-i Bukhara, Suluk al-Muluk

Fazlallah Khunji Isfahani (Persian: فضل الله خنجی اصفهانی; 1455–1521), was a Persian religious scholar, historian and political writer. He was born in 1455 in Shiraz, a city in Fars, a region in southern Iran. His father belonged to the Ruzbihan family, which was descended from the Sufi author Ruzbihan Baqli (died 1209), while his mother belonged to the Sa'idi family. Through both his parents, Khunji belonged to the affluent and influential ulama (clergical class) of Fars, who were respected and protected by the Turkmen Aq Qoyunlu. In 1487, Khunji left Shiraz for the third time for a Hajj. He met Sultan Ya'qub of Aq Qoyunlu near the Sahand mountain and agreed to write the history of Aq Qoyunlu dynasty. When the Safavid shah Ismail I started the Shi'ification of Iran and the persecution of Sunni Muslims, Khunji fled to Transoxiana, where he lived for the rest of his life under the patronage of Timurids and Shaybanids.

== Works ==
- Tarikh-i Alam-ara-yi Amini
- Mihman-Nama-i Bukhara
- Suluk al-Muluk

== Sources ==
- Blow, David (2009). Shah Abbas: The Ruthless King Who became an Iranian Legend. London, UK: I. B. Tauris & Co. Ltd. ISBN 978-1-84511-989-8. LCCN 2009464064.
- Haarmann, U. (1986). "K̲h̲und̲j̲ī". In Bosworth, C. E.; van Donzel, E.; Lewis, B. & Pellat, Ch. (eds.). The Encyclopaedia of Islam, Second Edition. Volume V: Khe–Mahi. Leiden: E. J. Brill. pp. 53–55. ISBN 978-90-04-07819-2.
- Newman, Andrew J. (2008). Safavid Iran: Rebirth of a Persian Empire. I.B.Tauris. pp. 1–281. ISBN 9780857716613.
