= Yashbak min Mahdi =

Mamluk commander (died 1480)

Yashbak min Mahdi (died 1480) was a senior Mamluk commander during the reign of Qaitbay. His military career began in Upper Egypt, where he gained a reputation for both courage and cruelty. In 1468, he was promoted to dawadar kabir by Sultan Qaitbay, and soon became his closest advisor. In 1480, Yashbak min Mahdi left Egypt to attempt to conquer Urfa from the Aq Qoyunlu, but was captured and executed there.

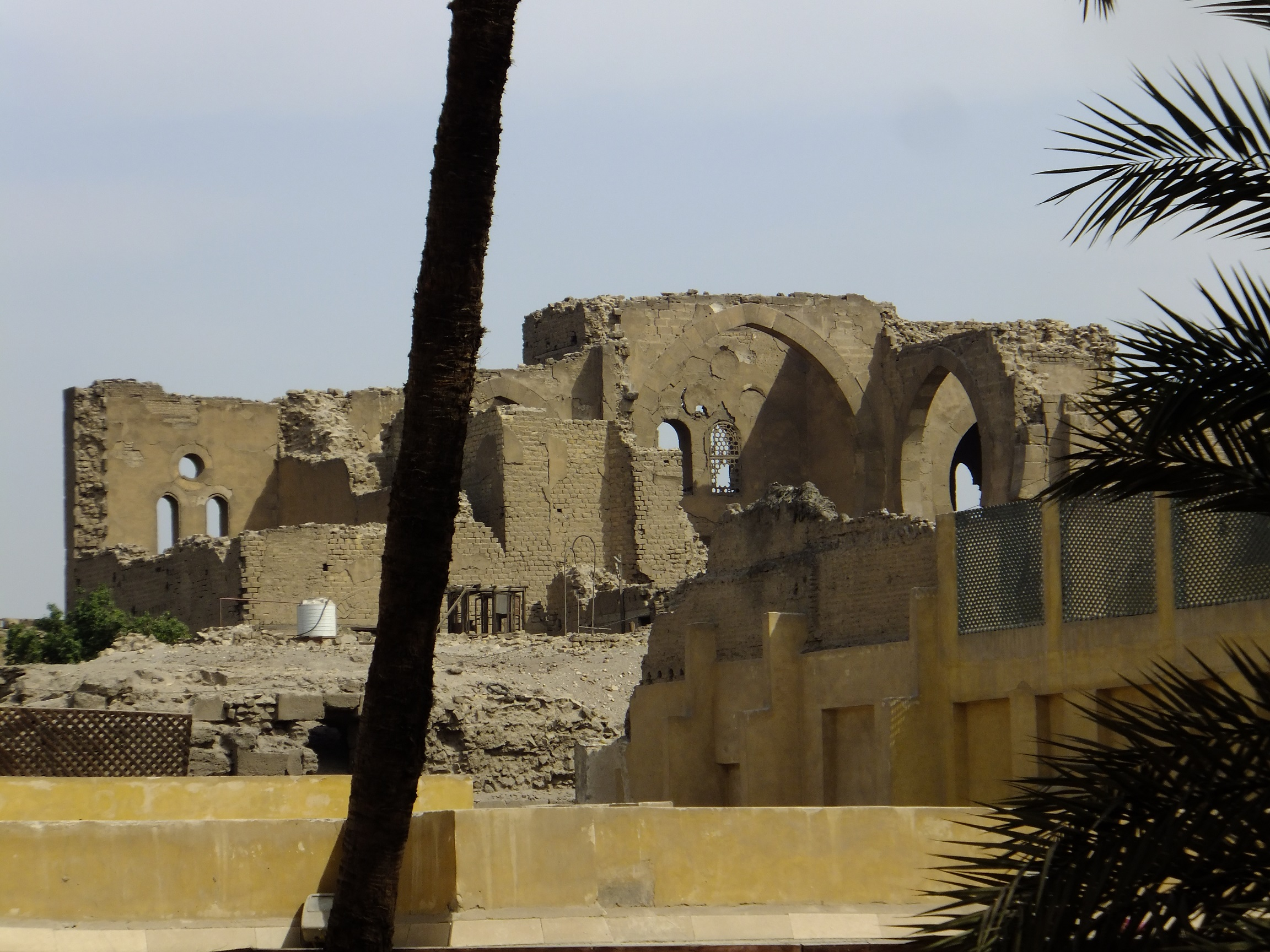
Ruins of the Palace of Yashbak

== Bibliography ==
- Petry, Carl F. (26 May 2022). The Mamluk Sultanate: A History. Cambridge University Press. ISBN 9781108471046.
- Yashbak min Mahdi: A Fearsome Emir (Plaque inside museum). Louvre: Louvre Museum. 2025.
