= Sultan Khalil =

Sultan of the Aq Qoyunlu in 1478

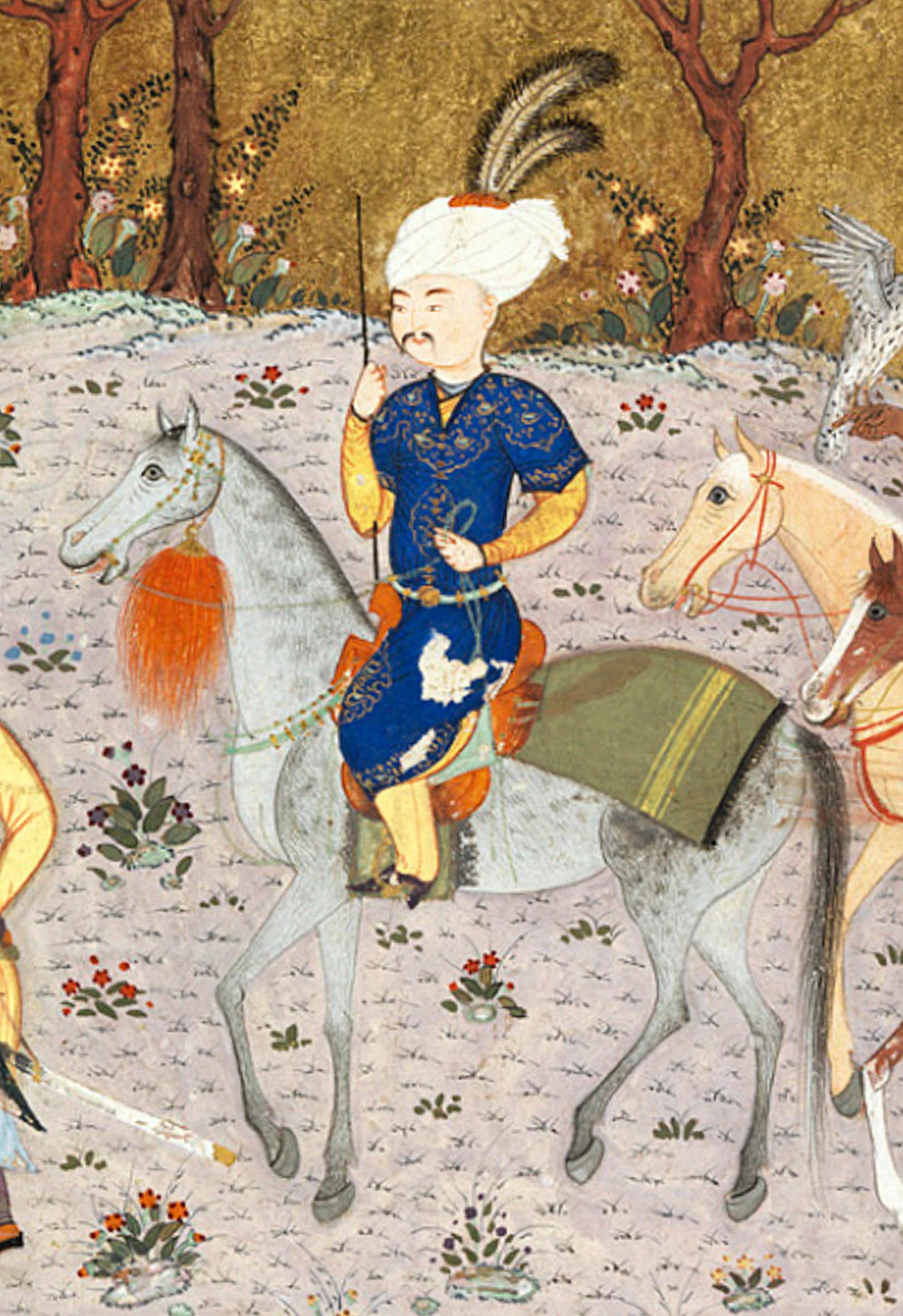
- Contemporary depiction of Sultan Khalil, in a miniature from the manuscript of Divan of Hidayat (1478).

Sultan of the Aq Qoyunlu
- Reign: 6 January 1478 – 15 July 1478
- Predecessor: Uzun Hasan
- Successor: Ya'qub Beg
- Born: Spring 1442
- Died: 15 July 1478 (aged 36); Near Khoy, Aq Qoyunlu
- Spouse: Unnamed daughter of Suhrab Beg Çemişgezeki
- Issue: Alvand Mirza 'Ali Mirza
- Dynasty: Aq Qoyunlu
- Father: Uzun Hasan
- Mother: Saljuqshah Begum
- Religion: Sunni Islam

Sultan Khalil Mirza (Azerbaijani: سلطان خلیل بن اوزون حسن, Persian: سلطان خلیل میرزا; spring 1442 – 15 July 1478) was an Aq Qoyunlu governor of Fars and briefly Sultan of the Aq Qoyunlu state, ruling from 6 January 1478 until his death on 15 July 1478.

== Life ==
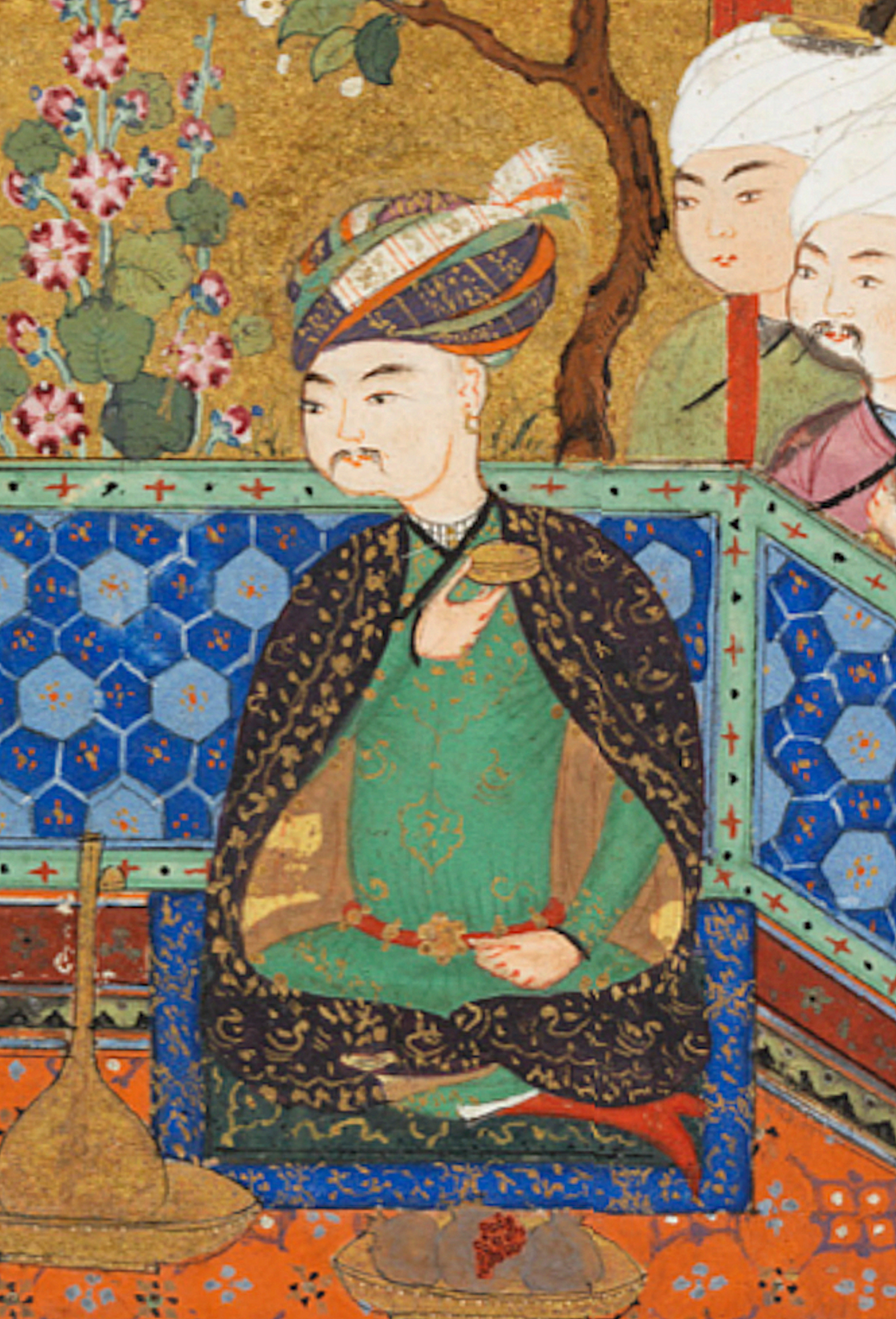
Sultan Khalil holding court.

Khalil was the eldest son of Uzun Hasan. His mother was Saljuqshah Begum, a daughter of Kur Muhammad Bayandur, and he was born in spring 1442. He served as governor of Fars, with his seat at Shiraz, during his father's reign. Upon Khalil's accession in 1478, Shiraz was appanaged to his eldest son, Alvand Mirza.

Immediately after Uzun Hasan's death, Khalil had his younger half-brother Maqsud Beg, a son of Despina Khatun, executed in Tabriz. Following his enthronement, he sent his younger full brothers Ya'qub Beg and Yusuf Beg, together with their mother Saljuqshah Begum, to Diyar Bakr.

In May 1478, his cousin Murad b. Jahangir rebelled against him. The revolt was suppressed, and Murad was executed by the middle of June.

A more serious rebellion was subsequently mounted in the west in the name of Khalil's younger brother Ya'qub. The two armies met near the town of Khuy, northwest of Tabriz, on 15 July 1478. Although the battle initially favored Khalil, he was cut off from the main body of his army, surrounded, and killed. Ya'qub subsequently succeeded him as sultan.

Khalil's half-brother Ughurlu Muhammad had earlier taken political asylum with the Ottomans, where Sultan Mehmed II gave him his daughter Gevherhan Hatun in marriage. Their son Ahmad Beg later took the Aq Qoyunlu throne but was killed shortly afterward.

=== Literary works ===
Several manuscripts are dated to the time Sultan Khalil was Governor of Shiraz in 1468–1478, following the Aq Qoyunlu capture of Shiraz by his father Uzun Hasan in 1468, such as a Divan (Collected Works) of Ali-Shir Nava'i (1471). A Tabriz manuscript dedicated to him in 1478 is also known. Sultan Khalil is also known to have worked on a copy of the Khamsa of Nizami while in Tabriz.

Khalil also appears in person in an illustrated manuscript of the Diwān of Hidayat (1478), written in Azarbayjani Turkish. The manuscript contains four miniatures showing Khalil engaged in courtly pursuits, among them hunting with hawks and receiving audiences, painted in the Turkman style with its characteristically small, round-faced figures.

== Family ==
Khalil married in 1459 an unnamed daughter of Suhrab Beg Çemişgezeki. He had two known sons:

- Alvand (Elvend) Mirza – Khalil's eldest son. Shiraz was assigned to him following his father's accession in 1478, and he died shortly after Khalil's overthrow. He is distinct from Alvand b. Yusuf, the later Aq Qoyunlu ruler and a son of Khalil's brother Yusuf.
- 'Ali Mirza – Khalil's other known son.

== Sources ==
- Langaroodi, Reza Rezazadeh; Negahban, Farzin (2015). "Āq-qūyūnlū". In Madelung, Wilferd; Daftary, Farhad (eds.). Encyclopaedia Islamica Online. Brill Online. ISSN 1875-9831.
- Minorsky, V. & Bosworth, C.E. (2000). "Uzun Ḥasan". In Bearman, P. J.; Bianquis, Th.; Bosworth, C. E.; van Donzel, E. & Heinrichs, W. P. (eds.). The Encyclopaedia of Islam, Second Edition. Volume X: T–U. Leiden: E. J. Brill. ISBN 978-90-04-11211-7.
- Quiring-Zoche, R. (1986). "Āq Qoyunlū". Encyclopædia Iranica, online edition, Vol. II, Fasc. 2. New York. pp. 163–168.
- Roemer, H. R. (1986). "The Turkmen dynasties". In Lockhart, Laurence; Jackson, Peter (eds.). The Cambridge History of Iran: The Timurid and Safavid Periods. Vol. 6. Cambridge: Cambridge University Press. ISBN 0-521-20094-6.
- Savory, R. M. (1964). "The Struggle for Supremacy in Persia after the death of Tīmūr". Der Islam. 40. De Gruyter: 35–65. doi:10.1515/islm.1964.40.1.35. S2CID 162340735.
- Woods, John E. (1999). The Aqquyunlu: Clan, Confederation, Empire (Revised and expanded ed.). Salt Lake City: University of Utah Press. ISBN 978-0-87480-565-9.
