= Miranshahi =

The Miranshahi were a collateral branch of the Aq Qoyunlu clan that was founded as a result of the union between Sidi-Ahmad ibn Miranshah Timuri and Uzun Hasan's daughter Ruqaya-Sultan.

== Sources ==
- Woods, John E. (1999). The Aqquyunlu: Clan, Confederation, Empire (Revised and Expanded ed.). University of Utah Press. ISBN 978-0874805659.
