= Sulayman Beg Bijan =

Sulayman Beg Bijan was a Turkoman military officer from the Bijan clan, who served the Aq Qoyunlu. He was captured and executed in Diyar Bakr in 1492 by the Aq Qoyunlu prince Nur Ali Bayandur in vengeance for the murder of his uncle Qurkhmas.

== Sources ==
- Langaroodi, Reza Rezazadeh; Negahban, Farzin (2008). "Āq-qūyūnlū". In Madelung, Wilferd; Daftary, Farhad (eds.). Encyclopaedia Islamica Online. Brill Online. ISSN 1875-9831.
- Woods, John E. (1999). The Aqquyunlu: Clan, Confederation, Empire (Revised and Expanded ed.). University of Utah Press. ISBN 978-0874805659.
