= Uzun Hasan =

Sultan of the Aq Qoyunlu from 1452 to 1478

- Padishah of Iran
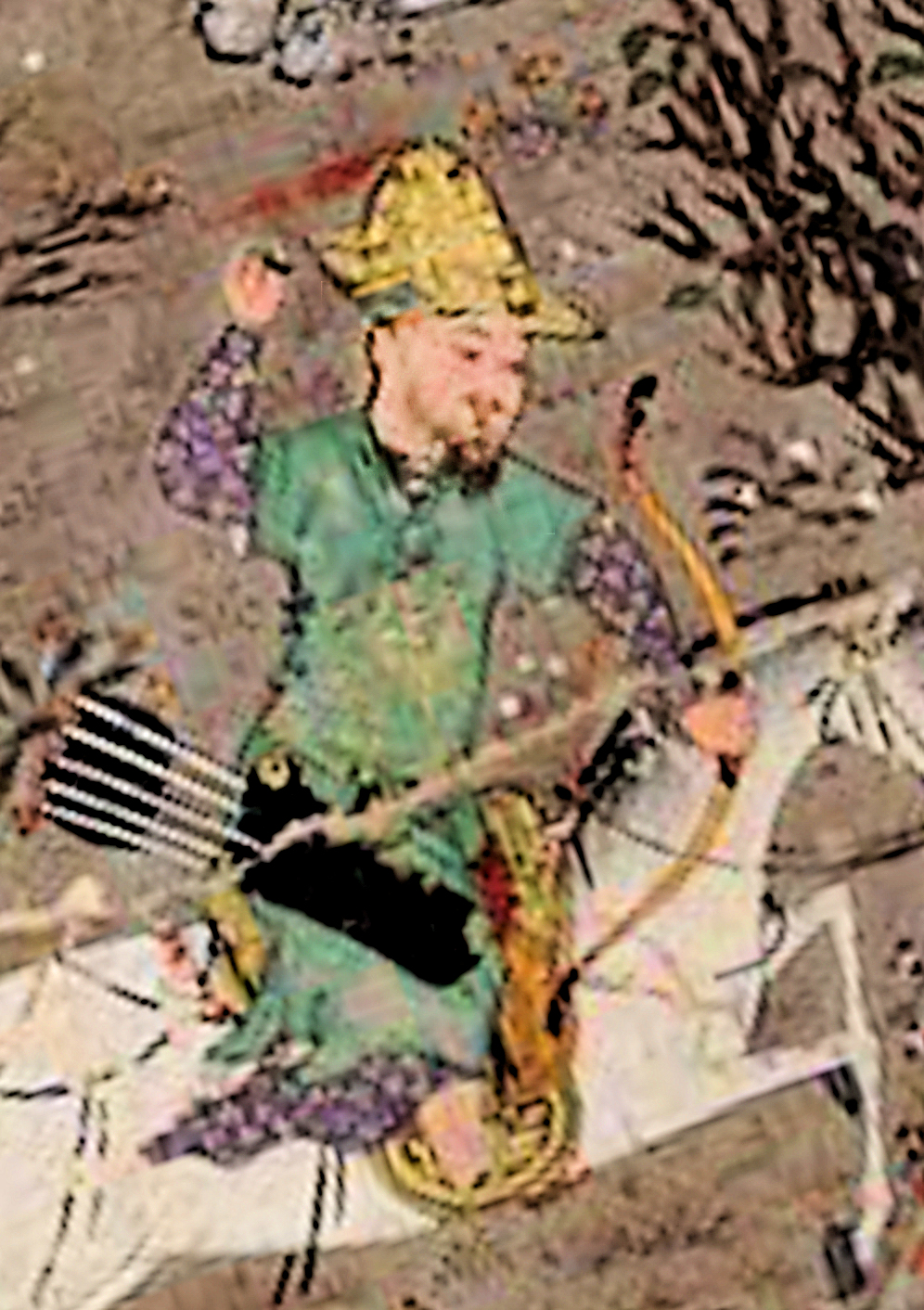
- Uzun Hasan on horse, 1460s–1470s.

Sultan of the Aq Qoyunlu
- Reign: September 1452 (Note: Woods dates Uzun Hasan's rule from 1457, when the Battle on the Tigris left him unchallenged ruler of the confederation, treating the seizure of Amid in September 1452 as the assumption of co-rule alongside his brother Jahangir. The Encyclopaedia Iranica dates the reign from the autumn of 1452.) – January 5, 1478
- Predecessor: Jahangir
- Successor: Sultan Khalil
- Born: February or March 1425; Diyarbakır
- Died: January 5, 1478 (aged 52) (Note: January 5, 1478 is the date given by Giosafat Barbaro, who was in Tabriz at the time, and is corroborated by the later Safavid histories Lubb al-tavarikh and Nusakh-i jahan-ara. The contemporary al-Ta'rikh al-ghiyathi instead gives January 2.); Winter quarters near Tabriz
- Burial: Nasriya tomb complex, Tabriz
- Spouse: Seljuk Shah Begum; Jan Khatun; Tarjil Khatun; Despina Khatun
- Issue: Sultan Khalil; Ughurlu Muhammad; Zaynal Mirza; Maqsud Beg; Ya'qub Beg; Yusuf Beg; Masih Mirza; Halima Alamshah Khatun; Khanum Khatun; Shahbeg Khatun; Two other daughters
Names
- Uzun Ḥasan ibn ʿAlī ibn Qara Yoluk ʿUthmān
- Dynasty: Aq Qoyunlu
- Father: Ali Beg
- Mother: Sara Khatun
- Religion: Sunni Islam
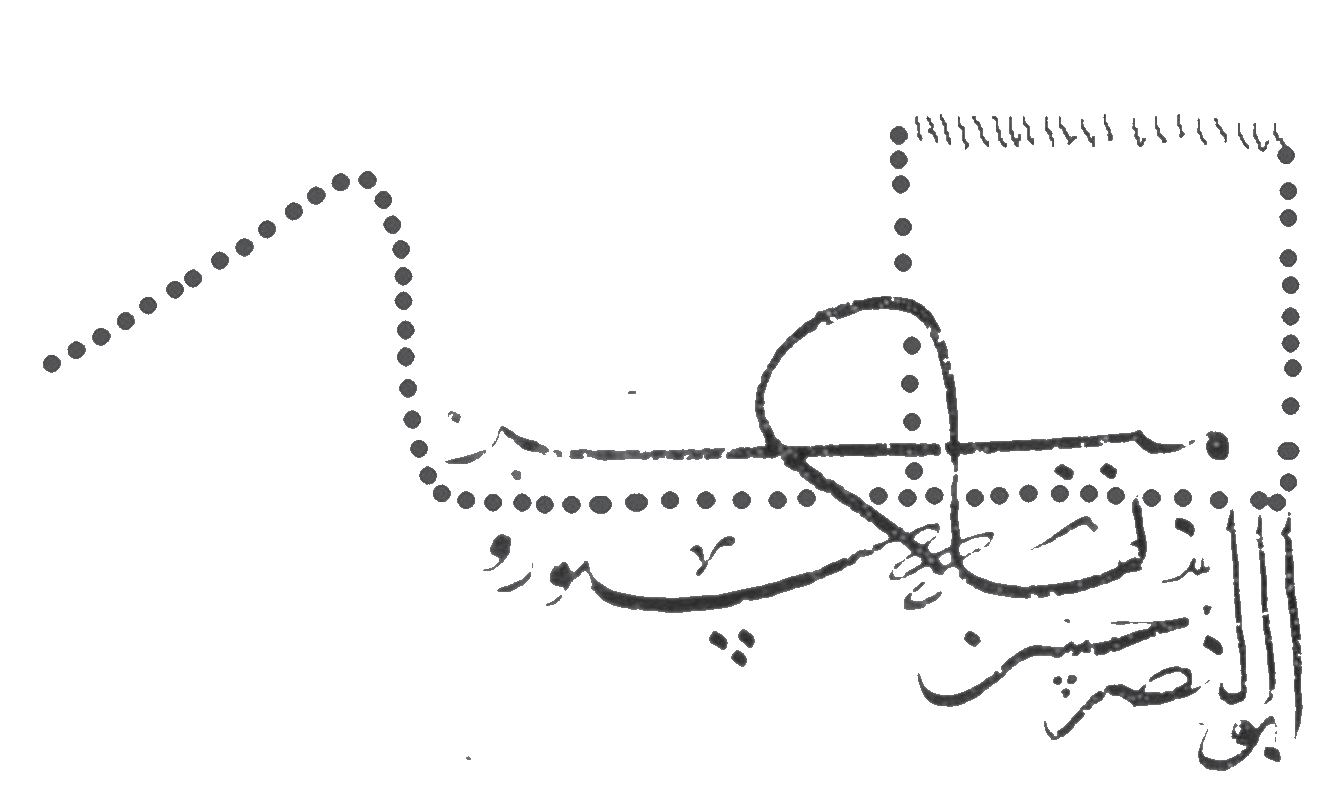
- Tughra

Uzun Hasan or Uzun Hassan (Note: Full Arabic-style name: Uzun Ḥasan ibn ʿAlī ibn Qara Yoluk ʿUthmān. He was also known by the kunya Abū l-Naṣr 'Father of Victory'. John E. Woods records the fuller regnal style Abu al-Nasr Hasan Bahadur, and notes that Ottoman and Safavid sources call him Hasan Padishah. His name is anglicized as Hasan the Tall.) (Persian: اوزون حسن; February or March 1425 – January 5, 1478) was a ruler of the Turkoman Aq Qoyunlu state and is generally considered to be its strongest ruler. Hasan was from the Bayandur tribe and presided over the confederation's territorial apex, when it included parts or all of present-day Iraq, Turkey, Azerbaijan, Iran, Transcaucasia, and Syria.

The younger son of Ali Beg and Sara Khatun, Hasan rose to prominence during the protracted Aq Qoyunlu civil war of the 1440s and 1450s. He seized the confederate capital of Amid from his brother Jahangir in a bloodless coup in September 1452, and became undisputed ruler after defeating Jahangir and his Qara Qoyunlu allies at the Battle on the Tigris in May 1457. Over the following decade he secured his frontiers against the Ayyubids of Hisn Kayfa, the Kurdish principalities of Diyar Bakr, the Dulkadirids and the Karamanids, while conducting raids into Georgia that won him a reputation as a ghazi.

Hasan destroyed the Qara Qoyunlu at the Battle of Muş on November 10, 1467, killing their ruler Jahan Shah, and captured and executed the Timurid sultan Abu Sa'id Mirza in Qarabagh two years later. These victories brought western and central Iran, Fars, Kerman and Arab Iraq under his rule and transformed the Aq Qoyunlu from a regional principality into an empire, with its capital transferred from Amid to Tabriz. Allied with the Venetian Republic against the Ottomans, he invaded Anatolia and Mamluk Syria in 1472 but was decisively defeated by Mehmed II at Otlukbeli on August 11, 1473, a reverse that Woods regards as having ended Aq Qoyunlu expansion and damaged the religious claims underpinning Hasan's authority. His last years were consumed by the rebellion of his son Ughurlu Muhammad and by declining health. He died near Tabriz in January 1478.

Hasan is remembered chiefly for his attempt to convert a nomadic tribal confederation into a settled Perso-Islamic empire. He expanded the central bureaucracy, recruited Iranian administrative families, promulgated a body of commercial, civil, penal and fiscal law known as the qanun-namas, and cultivated the religious establishment and the Sufi orders, including the Safavid order, into which he married both a sister and a daughter. His grandson Ismail I founded the Safavid state in 1501.

== Background ==
The Aq Qoyunlu were a confederation of Turkoman clans of the Oghuz tradition, whose paramount clan, the Bayandur, had established itself in the Bayburt–Erzincan region and around Amid during the fourteenth century. Uzun Hasan's grandfather Qara 'Usman, also written Kara Yülük Osman (died 1435), built the principality out of his participation in Timur's Anatolian and Syrian campaigns. At Aleppo in 1400 Timur rewarded Qara 'Usman's eldest son Ibrahim with the fortified city of Amid, held by Timur since its capture from the Artuqid al-Zahir 'Isa in 1394; Amid remained the capital of the principality until Hasan's conquests of 1467–69, when it was replaced by Tabriz. Timur also recognized Qara 'Usman as legitimate ruler of the Aq Qoyunlu, and after the confiscation of the Samarqand spoils train left him sole leader of the confederation by removing his brothers Ahmad and Pir 'Ali. Ruha came to Qara 'Usman from the Mamluk sultan al-Nasir Faraj, as a reward for the death of the rebel Jakam.

Uzun Hasan was born in February or March 1425, the son of Ali Beg (died 1443) and of Sara Khatun, a daughter of the Bayandur chief Pir 'Ali; his elder brother Jahangir was born about 1417. Qara 'Usman's death in 1435 opened the Aq Qoyunlu Great Civil War, a struggle among his sons and grandsons that lasted more than two decades and drew in the Mamluks, the Ottomans, the Timurids and the rival Qara Qoyunlu confederation.

== Reign ==
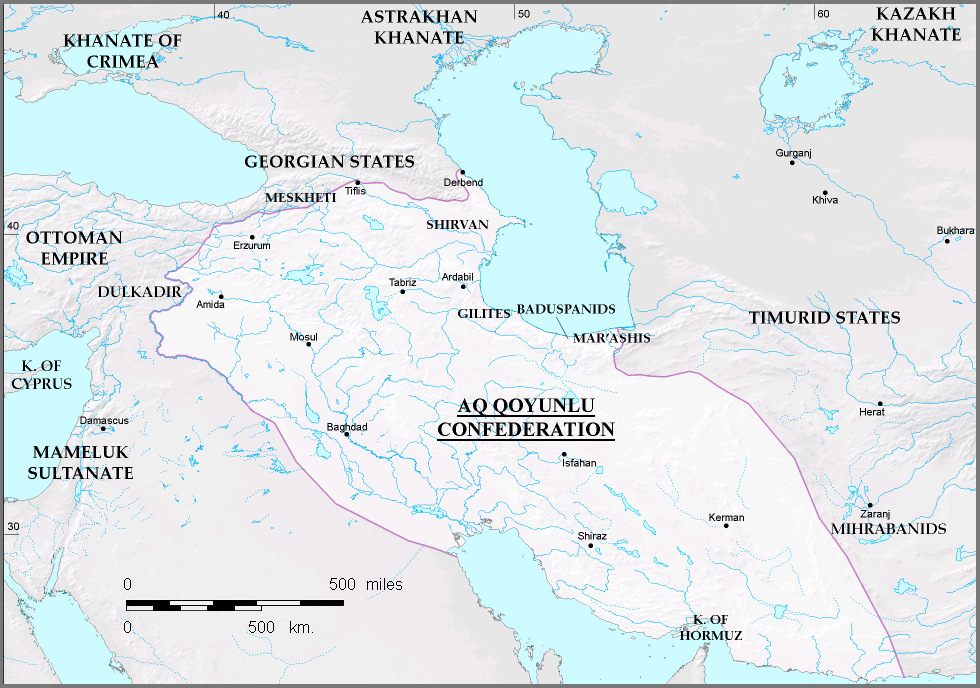
The Aq Qoyunlu empire by the end of Uzun Hasan's reign in 1478

At the time of Hasan's ascension, Persia was divided between two rival Turkoman rulers, Jahan Shah of the Qara Qoyunlu (the Black Sheep Turkoman) and Uzun Hasan. After twenty years of fighting, Uzun Hasan eventually defeated Jahan Shah at the Battle of Chapakchur, near the sanjak of Çapakçur in present-day eastern Turkey on October 30 (or November 11), 1467. Upon the defeat of the latter, the Timurid ruler Abu Sa'id Mirza answered Jahan Shah's son's request for aid, taking much of Jahan Shah's former land and going to war with Uzun Hasan despite the latter's offers of peace. Uzun Hasan then ambushed and captured Abu Sa'id at the Battle of Qarabagh, whereupon he was executed by Yadgar Muhammad Mirza, a rival. In 1463, the Venetian Senate, seeking allies in its war against the Ottomans, sent Lazzaro Querini as its first ambassador to Tabriz, but he was unable to persuade Uzun Hasan to attack the Ottomans. Hasan sent his own envoys to Venice in return. In 1465, Hasan attacked and captured Harput from the Beylik of Dulkadir. In 1471, Querini returned to Venice with Hasan's ambassador Murad. The Venetian Senate voted to send another envoy to Persia, choosing Caterino Zeno after two other men declined. Zeno, whose wife was the niece of Uzun Hasan's wife, was able to persuade Hasan to attack the Turks. Hasan was successful at first, but there was no simultaneous attack by any of the western powers. Uzun Hasan met the Ottomans in battle near Erzincan in 1471, advanced as far as Akşehir, pillaging and destroying Tokat, and fought a battle at Tercan in 1473. He was defeated by Mehmed II at the Battle of Otlukbeli in the late summer of 1473. In 1473, Giosafat Barbaro was selected as another Venetian ambassador to Persia, due to his experience in Crimea, Muscovy, and Tartary. Although Barbaro got on well with Uzun Hasan, he was unable to persuade the ruler to attack the Ottomans again. Shortly afterwards, Hasan's son Ughurlu Muhammad rose in rebellion, seizing the city of Shiraz. After yet another Venetian ambassador, Ambrogio Contarini, arrived in Persia, Uzun Hasan decided that Contarini would return to Venice with a report, while Giosafat Barbaro would stay. Barbaro was the last Venetian ambassador to leave Persia after Uzun Hasan died in 1478. While Hasan's sons fought each other for the throne, Barbaro hired an Armenian guide and escaped. Contarini, ambassador to Uzun Hasan's court from 1473 to 1476, described him as follows:

The king is of a good size, with a thin visage and agreeable countenance, and seemed to be about seventy years old. His manners were very affable, and he conversed familiarly with everyone around him, but I noticed that his hands trembled when he raised the cup to his lips.

His name means "tall", and Contarini reported that he was also "very lean".

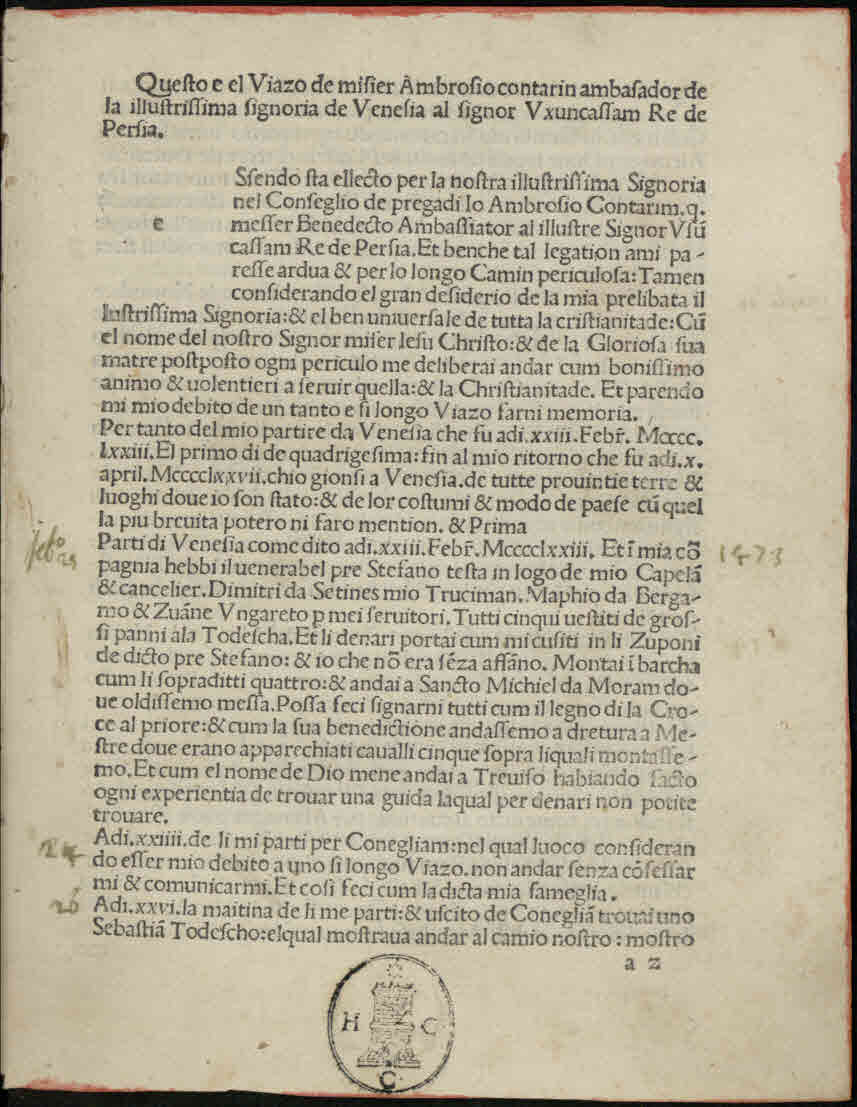
Ambrogio Contarini, Viaggio al signor Usun Hassan re di Persia ("Voyage to Sir Usun Hassan King of Persia"), 1487

Contarini also wrote:

The empire of Uzun-Hassan is very extensive and is bounded by Turkey and Caramania, belonging to the Sultan, and which latter country extends to Aleppo. Uzun-Hassan took the kingdom of Persia from Causa, whom he put to death. The city of Ecbatana, or Tauris, is the usual residence of Uzun-Hassan; Persepolis or Shiras ... which is twenty-four days journey from thence, being the last city of his empire, bordering on the Zagathais, who are the sons of Buzech, sultan of the Tartars, and with whom he is continually at war. On the other side is the country of Media, which is under subjection to Sivansa, who pays a kind of yearly tribute to Uzun-Hassan. It is said that he has likewise some provinces on the other side of the Euphrates, in the neighbourhood of the Turks. The whole country, all the way to Ispahan ... is exceedingly arid, having very few trees and little water, yet it is fertile in grain and other provisions. His eldest son, named Ogurlu Mohamed, was much spoken of when I was in Persia, as he had rebelled against his father. He had other three sons; Khalil Mirza, the elder of these was about thirty-five years old, and had the government of Shiras. Yaqub Beg, another son of Uzun-Hassan, was about fifteen, and I have forgotten the name of a third son. By one of his wives, he had a son named Masubech, or Maksud beg, whom he kept in prison because he was detected corresponding with his rebellious brother Ogurlu, and whom he afterward put to death. According to the best accounts which I received from different persons, the forces of Uzun-Hassan may amount to about 50,000 cavalries, a considerable part of whom are not of much value. It has been reported by some who were present, that at one time he led an army of 40,000 Persians to battle against the Turks, for the purpose of restoring Pirameth to the sovereignty of Karamania, whence he had been expelled by the infidels.

== Legacy ==
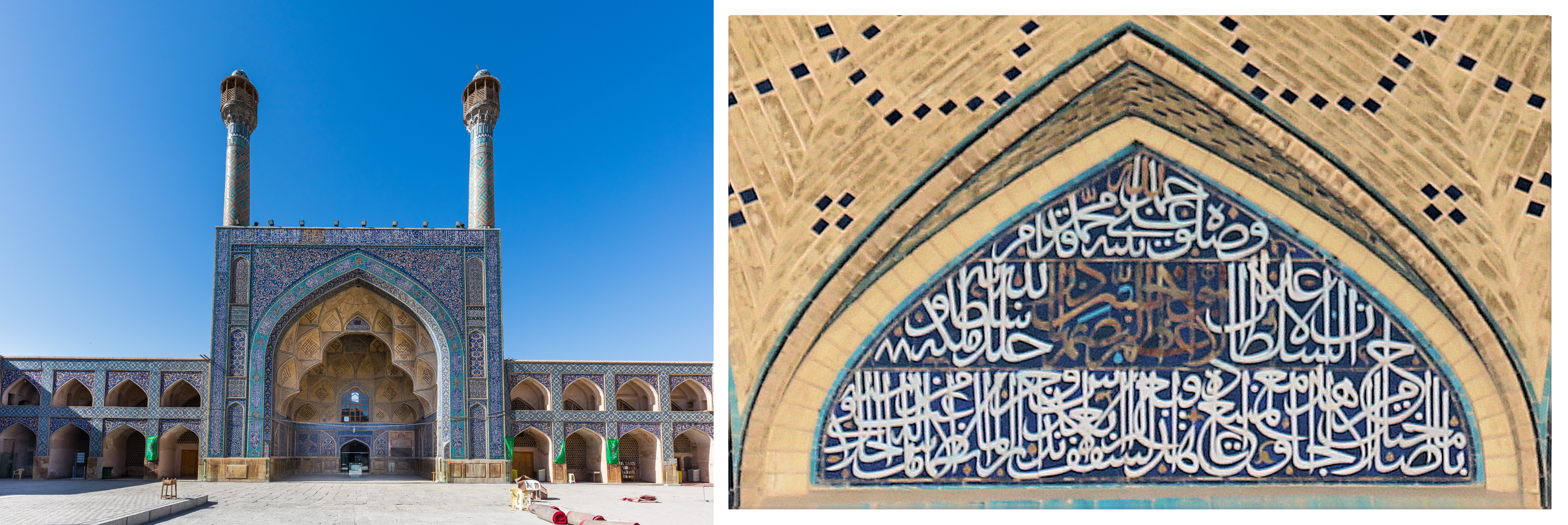
South iwan of the courtyard of the Jameh Mosque of Isfahan, with central Uzun Hasan inscription. The iwan was renovated by Uzun Hasan, who also had the entire surface decorated with enamel colored tiles.

Uzun Hasan was the first Aq Qoyunlu ruler who openly embarked on a campaign to transform the Aq Qoyunlu tribal confederation into a Perso-Islamic sultanate. This transformation campaign commenced after his conquests of northwestern and central Iran, where he, as a byproduct, displaced the waning authority of the Timurids. As his realm grew to preside over ever more Iranian land, he employed Iranian bureaucrats with experience in working for previous local polities to administer the newly obtained Aq Qoyunlu provinces. Although these Aq Qoyunlu-era Iranian bureaucrats did not have the same level of political authority as Nizam al-Mulk (died 1092) did under the Seljuks, they did share the same role of conducting the assimilation of Turkic tribesmen into a political tradition characterized by Perso-Islamic facets. Uzun Hasan also provided for the Islamic aspect of his rudimentary Perso-Islamic state, for he took great care in nourishing Islamic organizations and Sufi orders, including the ever more powerful Safavid order. In the process, he married off his sister to Shaykh Junayd, the then leader of the Safavid order, and one of his daughters to Junayd's son and successor, Shaykh Haydar. Uzun Hasan also ordered the Quran to be translated into Turkic.

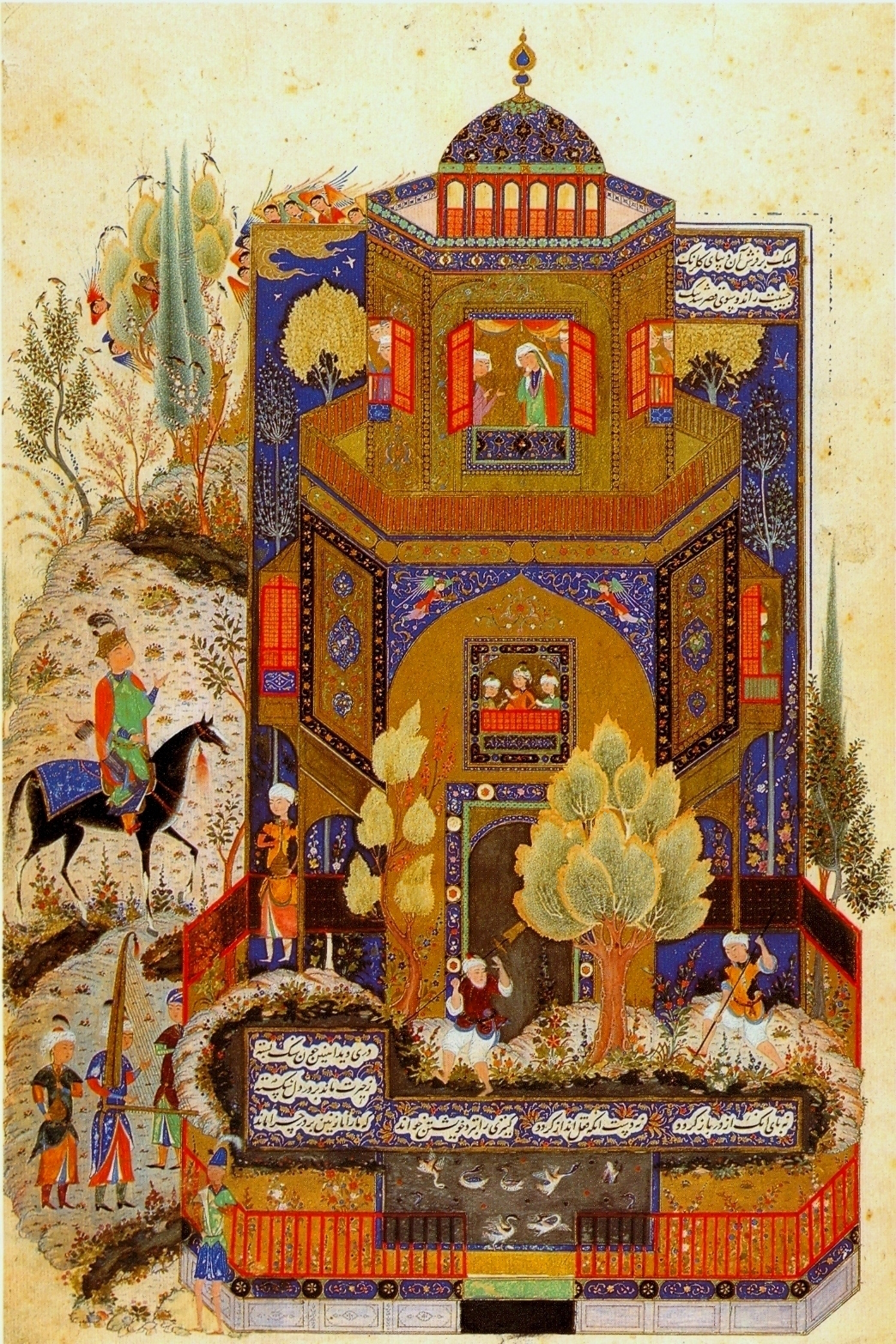
The celebrated Hasht Behesht ("Eight Paradises") Palace in Tabriz was started by Uzun Hasan and completed by his son Ya'qub Beg. Khamsa of Nizami, 1481, Tabriz (manuscript commissioned by Ya'qub Beg).

He initiated some financial and administrative reforms to weaken the separatism of the military and tribal nobility and to strengthen his vast state. The sources do not provide detailed information about Uzun Hasan's reformist activities. Although the texts of his laws have not reached us, it is possible to judge the reforms on the basis of the little information available about the laws that the chroniclers called "King Hasan's Laws" or "Dasturi-Hasan Bey". Some documents related to the western territories of the Aq Qoyunlu state, which became part of the Ottoman Empire (Diyarbakır, Mardin, Urfa, etc.), are kept in the Turkish archives. These sources are important in terms of studying feudal relations in the provinces of the Aq Qoyunlu. The general nature of Uzun Hasan's reform is stated in Tarikh al-Qiyasi:

Uzun Hasan was fair and kind. He wanted to abolish taxes throughout the country. But the emirs did not agree with him. The Sultan then reduced the taxes by half to twenty-one dirhams ... He clarified the amount of taxes collected in the whole country. Uzun Hasan demanded that lawbreakers be severely punished. The Sultan 'sent the law to every province of the State to put into effect.'

After the conquest of eastern Anatolia in 1517–18, and of Iraq in 1537, the Ottomans preserved the laws of Uzun Hasan (Qānūn-nāma-ye Ḥasan Pādšāh). It was after 1540 that the Ottoman regulations replaced the Aq Qoyunlu code. Large parts of his tax and trade laws are recorded in Ottoman sources.

== Appearance ==
Contarini described him as "tall and thin", with "a slightly Tartar expression of countenance, with a constant colour on his face".

== Family ==
=== Consorts ===
Four consorts are identified in Woods's genealogical reconstruction of Uzun Hasan's family:

- Seljuk Shah Begum, the daughter of Uzun Hasan’s paternal uncle, Kur Muhammad. Woods identifies her as Uzun Hasan’s chief wife, and Hoca Sadeddin identifies her as “Uzun Hasan’s most beloved and most favored wife.” She was the mother of Sultan Khalil, Ya'qub, and Yusuf.
- Jan Khatun, daughter of Dawlatshah Beg Bulduqani-Mardasi, the Kurdish ruler of Eğil and mother of Ughurlu Muhammad. Faruk Sümer likewise identifies Ughurlu Muhammad as the son of the daughter of the ruler of Eğil.
- Tarjil Khatun, daughter of Umar Beg Zraqi, the Kurdish ruler of Tercil and mother of Zaynal Mirza. Woods dates Uzun Hasan's marriage alliance with Umar Beg's daughter to around 1446–1447.
- Theodora Megale Komnene, better known as Despina Khatun, daughter of Emperor John IV of Trebizond. The marriage probably took place around 1458; Woods notes evidence placing it between 1457 and 1459.

=== Sons ===
Uzun Hasan had at least seven sons. Woods's genealogy identifies the mothers of all seven.

- Sultan Khalil (1442–1478) – with Seljuk Shah Begum. Woods identifies him as Uzun Hasan's eldest son; he succeeded his father in January 1478.
- Ughurlu Muhammad (1442 - 1477) – with .an Kathun Woods states that he was born eight months after Sultan Khalil. After rebelling against his father, he eventually took refuge with the Ottoman sultan Mehmed II and married Mehmed's daughter Gevherhan Hatun. Their son Ahmad Beg briefly seized the Aq Qoyunlu throne in 1497.
- Zaynal Mirza (c. 1448 – August 11, 1473) – with Tarjil Khatun. He was Uzun Hasan's third son and governor of Kirman. He was killed at the Battle of Otlukbeli.
- Maqsud Beg (died 1478) – with Despina Khatun. Sultan Khalil had his approximately twenty-year-old half-brother executed immediately after Uzun Hasan's death.
- Yaqub Beg (died 1490) – with Seljuk Shah Begum. Woods describes him as fourteen at Uzun Hasan's death, while noting that Khunji-Isfahani's account makes him thirteen. Ya'qub defeated Sultan Khalil later in 1478 and became sultan.
- Yusuf Beg (died 1490) – with Seljuk Shah Begum. Sultan Khalil sent Yusuf and his full brother Ya'qub to Diyar Bakr with their mother in 1478. Yusuf died shortly before Ya'qub in the Qarabagh winter camp in 1490. He was the father of the later claimants Alvand and Muhammadi.
- Masih Mirza –After Ya'qub's death in December 1490, a Bayandur faction attempted to replace Baysunghur with Masih; Masih was killed in the ensuing fighting.

=== Daughters ===
Woods's genealogical table records five daughters of Uzun Hasan.

- Halima Alamshah Khatun (1460 - 1522) – married her cousin Shaykh Haydar, son of Uzun Hasan's sister Khadija Begum and Shaykh Junayd. Sultan Ali, Ibrahim, and Isma'il, the founder of the Safavid dynasty, were sons of Haydar by Uzun Hasan's daughter. In the Christian sources she was called Martha.
- Khanum Khatun – married Qasim bin Jahangir.
- Shahbeg Khatun – married Ghazi Khan Sharvani.
- An unnamed daughter – with Despina Khatun, married Abd al-Baqi Miranshahi.
- An unnamed daughter – with Despina Khatun, married Bayram Beg Qaramanlu.

== Sources ==
- Ghereghlou, Kioumars (2016). "Ḥaydar Ṣafavi". Encyclopaedia Iranica.
- Kerr, Robert (1811). A General History and Collection of Voyages and Travels. Vol. II. Edinburgh: William Blackwood.
- Lambton, Ann Katherine Swynford; Lewis, Bernard; Holt, P.M., eds. (1985). The Cambridge History of Islam. Vol. 2. Cambridge University Press.
- Langaroodi, Reza Rezazadeh; Negahban, Farzin (2015). "Āq-qūyūnlū". In Madelung, Wilferd; Daftary, Farhad (eds.). Encyclopaedia Islamica Online. Brill Online. ISSN 1875-9831.
- Minorsky, V. & Bosworth, C.E. (2000). "Uzun Ḥasan". In Bearman, P. J.; Bianquis, Th.; Bosworth, C. E.; van Donzel, E. & Heinrichs, W. P. (eds.). The Encyclopaedia of Islam, Second Edition. Volume X: T–U. Leiden: E. J. Brill. pp. 963–967. ISBN 978-90-04-11211-7.
- Quiring-Zoche, R. (1986). "Aq Qoyunlū". Encyclopaedia Iranica, Vol. II, Fasc. 2. pp. 163–168.
- Woods, John E. (1999). The Aqquyunlu: Clan, Confederation, Empire (Rev. and expanded ed.). Salt Lake City: University of Utah Press. ISBN 978-0-87480-565-9.

Preceded by M'uizz al-Din Jihangir ibn 'Ali ibn Qara Yülük	Ruler of the Aq Qoyunlu; 1452–1478	Succeeded by Sultan Khalil
