= 6th-century Byzantine domes =

The 6th century marks a turning point for domed church architecture. Centrally planned domed churches had been built since the 4th century for very particular functions, such as palace churches or martyria, with a slight widening of use around 500 AD, but most church buildings were timber-roofed halls on the basilica plan. Early vaulted churches were built in Constantinople and west Asia Minor, with domed churches replacing timber-roofed basilicas in Ephesus, Priene, and Pythagoreion. Domed churches required radically different supporting structures compared to timber-roofed basilicas and new vaulting patterns, such as a series on domes on pendentives, can be determined based on the ruins of large masonry piers and fragments of the vaults. Early Byzantine examples include the cruciform Basilica of St. John near Ephesus and the aisleless twin-domed basilica at Philadelphia called the church of St. John.

Italian church architecture from the late sixth century to the end of the eighth century was influenced less by the trends of Constantinople than by a variety of Byzantine provincial plans. The sacristy of the Basilica of Saints Felice and Fortunato in Vicenza, Italy, is part of an older cruciform domed church built by General Narses in 554. The style of the church was characteristic of the Byzantine churches of Ravenna. Other 6th century domes in Italy include those of the baptistery of Canosa di Puglia, the Basilica of San Leucio at Canosa, the baptistery of Nocera Superiore, and the Sanctuary of San Prosdocimo in the Abbey of Santa Giustina in Padua. Domes from the 6th century made with ceramic vaulting tubes include a bath at the Theodoric Villa in Galeata (5th-6th centuries), San Vitale in Ravenna, the bath in the Bishop's Palace in Ravenna, a small building near St. Apollinaris in Classe, the baptistery of Santa Maria in Vado, Ferrara, and the martyrium of the Basilica of Sant'Eufemia, Grado.

Other 6th century examples of domed constructions may include Nostra Segnora de Mesumundu in Siligo, Sardinia (before 534), Sant’Angelo in Perugia, San Miserino near San Donaci (6th or 7th century), and the Trigona of Cittadella near Noto (6th or 7th century). The Basilica of San Saturnino in Sardinia was built in the 6th century as a Greek-cross martyrium with a central dome.

== Justin I ==
Under Justin I in the 520s, Justinian seems to have razed the Basilica of St. John in Ephesus and replaced it with a Greek cross cruciform building with five domes similar to his later Church of the Holy Apostles in Constantinople. This version of the building was described by Procopius in The Buildings. The remains of pendentives indicate that the central dome was a compound dome with windows and the other four domes were sail vaults, based on an interpretation that pendentives built from the extrados of their supporting arches were part of domes on pendentives, or compound domes, and pendentives built from the side faces of the supporting arches were part of pendentive domes, or sail vaults. This interpretation is consistent with the construction techniques of other Byzantine buildings, such as Hagia Eirene and Hagia Sophia, as well as the written description of the Basilica of St. John by Procopius. The nave domes were built in arched courses of double curvature, rather than simple circular courses, and this may have enabled the domes to be built with smaller supports or templates during construction. Justinian would later replace the western arm of this building, likely in the 550s, expanding it from one domed bay to two domed bays. The domes over the modified nave of Justinian were built over rectangular bays, but were also spherical sail vaults. They used a construction technique of overlapping arches courses, similar to that used for the domes of the Mausoleum of Diocletian at Split, the east mausoleum at Side, and possibly the nave dome of Basilica B at Phillipi.

During Justin's reign, Justinian was involved in refurbishing a number of 4th century churches. For the Church of the Virgin of Blachernae, he is credited with altering the existing basilica by adding a dome supported by a semicircle of columns.

== Justinian I ==
The Church of St. Polyeuctus in Constantinople (524–527) may have been built as a large and lavish domed basilica similar to the Meriamlik church of fifty years before—and to the later Hagia Irene of Emperor Justinian—by Anicia Juliana, a descendant of the former imperial house, although the linear walls suggest a timber roof, rather than a brick dome. The ceiling may instead have been a flat truss and brickstamp evidence indicates construction of the church lasted from 508 to 521. There is a story that she used the contribution to public funds that she had promised Justinian on his ascension to the throne to roof her church in gold. The church included an inscription praising Juliana for having "surpassed Solomon" with the building, and it may have been with this in mind that Justinian would later say of his Hagia Sophia, "Solomon, I have vanquished thee!".

The earliest existing of Justinian's domed buildings may be the central plan Church of Saints Sergius and Bacchus in Constantinople, completed by 536. It is called the "Little Hagia Sophia" mosque today, but may have been begun five years earlier than that building. The dome rests on an octagonal base created by eight arches on piers and is divided into sixteen sections. Those sections above the flat sides of the octagon are flat and contain a window at their base, alternating with sections from the corners of the octagon that are scalloped, creating an unusual kind of pumpkin dome. Design and construction dates in the mid 520s have been proposed. Its dates of construction are disputed and may have begun in 532. The alternating scalloped and flat surfaces of the current dome resemble those in Hadrian's half-dome Serapeum in Tivoli, but may have replaced an original drum and dome similar to that over the Basilica of San Vitale in Ravenna. The building was built within the precinct of the Palace of Hormistas, the residence of Justinian before his ascension to the throne in 527, and includes an inscription mentioning the "sceptered Justinian" and "God-crowned Theodora". Another part of the inscription suggests that Saint Sergius surpasses all other military saints, which has been interpreted as an oblique reference to Saint Polyeuctus.

In the second third of the 6th century, church building by the Emperor Justinian used the domed cross unit on a monumental scale, in keeping with Justinian's emphasis on bold architectural innovation. His church architecture emphasized the central dome and his architects made the domed brick-vaulted central plan standard throughout the Roman east. This divergence with the Roman west from the second third of the 6th century may be considered the beginning of a "Byzantine" architecture. Timber-roofed basilicas, which had previously been the standard church form, would continue to be so in the medieval west.

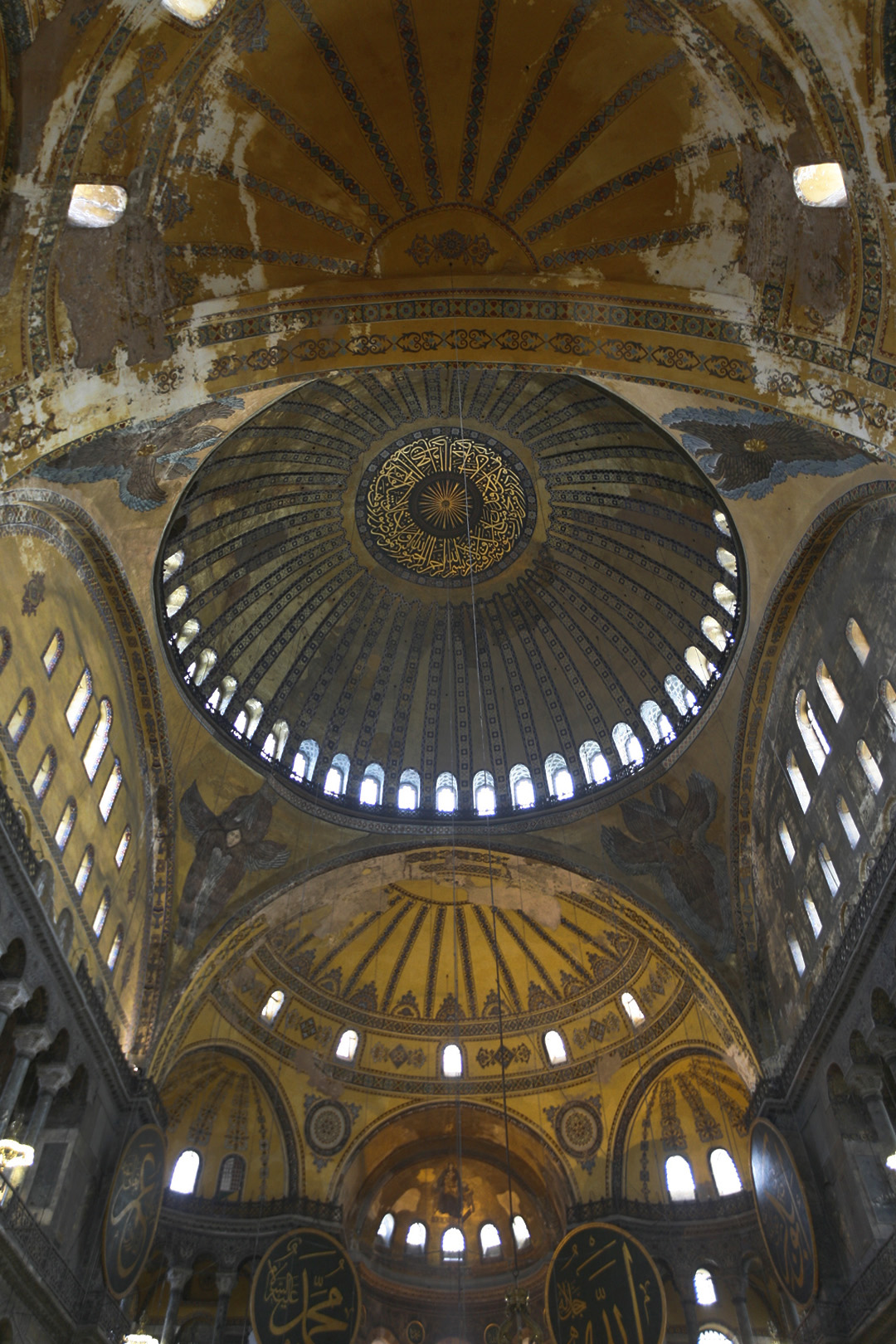
The Hagia Sophia in Istanbul (annotations).

After the Nika Revolt destroyed much of the city of Constantinople in 532, including the churches of Hagia Sophia ("Holy Wisdom") and Hagia Irene ("Holy Peace"), Justinian had the opportunity to rebuild. Both had been basilica plan churches and both were rebuilt as domed basilicas, although the Hagia Sophia was rebuilt on a much grander scale. Built by Anthemius of Tralles and Isidore of Miletus in Constantinople between 532 and 537, the Hagia Sophia has been called the greatest building in the world. It is an original and innovative design with no known precedents in the way it covers a basilica plan with dome and semi-domes. It seems to belong to a development of vaulted centralized spaces beginning in Roman imperial residences and including the 5th century church of San Lorenzo in Milan, which likewise originally had a square central vault structure with exedras penetrating into an outer shell or ambulatory and thrusts disposed in depth.

Periodic earthquakes in the region have caused three partial collapses of the dome and necessitated repairs. The precise shape of the original central dome completed in 537 was significantly different from the current one and, according to contemporary accounts, much bolder. Procopius wrote that the original dome seemed "not to rest upon solid masonry, but to cover the space with its golden dome suspended from heaven." Byzantine chronicler John Malalas reported that this dome was 20 byzantine feet lower than its replacement. One theory is that the original dome continued the curve of the existing pendentives (which were partially reconstructed after its collapse), creating a massive sail vault pierced with a ring of windows. This vault would have been part of a theoretical sphere 46 meters (151 ft) in diameter (the distance of the diagonal of the square bay defined by the pendentives), seven percent greater than the span of the Pantheon's dome. Another theory raises the shallow cap of this dome (the portion above what are today the pendentives) on a relatively short recessed drum containing the windows.

This first dome partially collapsed on May 7, 558, after earthquakes in 553 and December 557, and the design was then revised to the present profile. Agathias, who likely witnessed both the original dome and its replacement, wrote that the replacement dome "did not strike spectators with as much amazement as before, but it was far more securely set up." The collapse of the first dome is associated with the piers and buttresses supporting the dome leaning outward in a direction transverse to the nave, due to a combination of thrust from the low dome encountering unsettled mortar from the rapid construction, subsidence in the natural rock foundations, and the 557 earthquake, although the buttresses have been corrected visually on their exterior end walls. This made the rebuilt dome slightly elliptical in plan. Earthquakes also caused partial collapses of the dome in 989 and 1346, so that the present dome consists of portions dating from the 6th century, on the north and south sides, and portions from the 10th and 14th centuries on the west and east sides, respectively. There are irregularities where these sectors meet. The profile was designed by Isidore the Younger, nephew of the original Isidore, before 563. Repairs completed in 994 were by Trdat of Armenia. Repairs completed in 1354 were by Astras, Faciolatus, and Giovanni Peralta.

The current central dome, above the pendentives, is about 750 millimeters (30 in) thick. Radar measurements of thicknesses between the ribs reported 75 cm from the 6th century portion, 95 cm from the 10th century portion, and 80 cm from the 14th century portion. The dome is about 32 meters (105 ft) wide and contains 40 radial ribs that spring from between the 40 windows at its base. Four of the windows were blocked as part of repairs in the 10th century. The ring of windows at the base of the central dome are in the portion where the greatest hoop tension would have been expected and so they may have been used to help alleviate cracking along the meridians. Iron cramps between the marble blocks of its cornice helped to reduce outward thrusts at the base and limit cracking, like the wooden tension rings used in other Byzantine brick domes. The original dome had included wooden tension chains at the base of the windows. Thin iron chains were added to the reconstructed dome at different times during the Byzantine period. Larger tie rods were added under the Ottomans in the 16th and 19th centuries. An image of Christ Pantokrator was added to the dome in the 14th century. It was later covered with Islamic calligraphy. The dome and pendentives are supported by four large arches springing from four piers. Additionally, two huge semi-domes of similar proportion are placed on opposite sides of the central dome and themselves contain smaller semi-domes between an additional four piers. The Hagia Sophia, as both the cathedral of Constantinople and the church of the adjacent Great Palace of Constantinople, has a form of octagonal plan.

The Hagia Sophia in Edessa included gold mosaic in its dome. The seventh century Syriac hymn Another Sogitha includes comparisons of its dome to the starry sky and of the broad arches on which the dome rests to the four corners of the earth. The church was rebuilt between 543 and 554 and was destroyed in 1031.

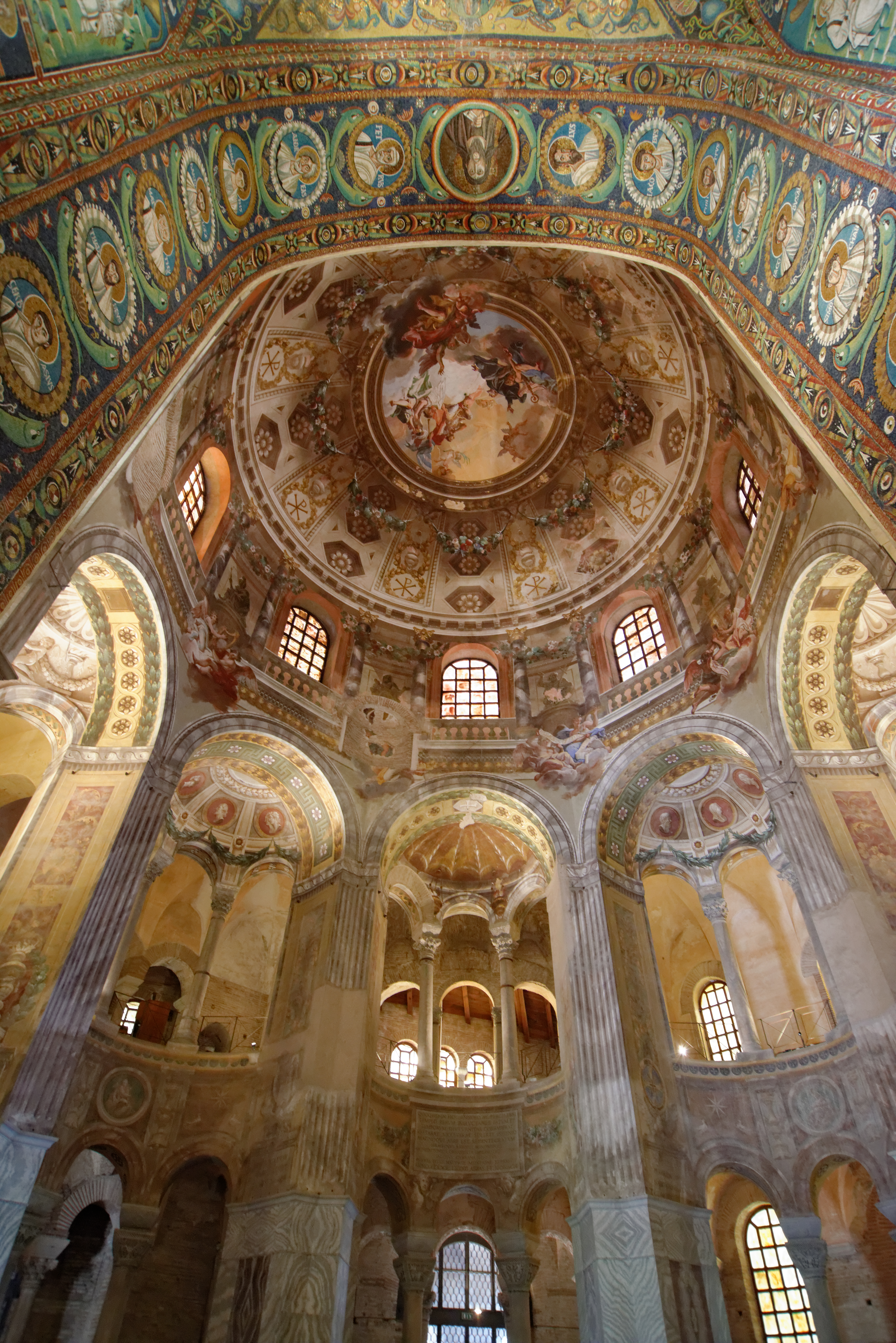
The Basilica of San Vitale in Ravenna

The city of Ravenna, Italy, had served as the capital of the Western Roman Empire after Milan from 402 and the capital of the subsequent kingdoms of Odoacer and of Theodoric until Justinian's reconquest in 540. An octagonal building in Ravenna, begun under Theodoric in 525, was completed under the Byzantines in 547 as the Basilica of San Vitale and contains a terracotta dome. It may belong to a school of architecture from 4th and 5th century Milan. The building is similar to the Byzantine Church of Saints Sergius and Bacchus and the later Chrysotriklinos, or throne hall and palace church of Constantinople, and it would be used as the model for Charlemagne's palace chapel at Aix-la-Chapelle. Hollow amphorae were fitted inside one another to provide a lightweight structure for the dome and avoid additional buttressing. It is 18 meters (59 ft) in diameter. The dome used about 77,000 vaulting tubes. The amphorae were arranged in a continuous spiral, which required minimal centering and formwork but was not strong enough for large spans. San Vitale has the largest surviving dome made from vaulting tubes. The vaulting tube building technique from North Africa used quick-drying but water soluble gypsum mortar. The dome was covered with a timber roof, which would be the favored practice for later medieval architects in Italy although it was unusual at the time.

In Constantinople, Justinian also tore down the aging Church of the Holy Apostles and rebuilt it on a grander scale between 536 and 550. The original building was a cruciform basilica with a central domed mausoleum. Justinian's replacement was apparently likewise cruciform but with a central dome and four flanking domes. The central dome over the crossing had pendentives and windows in its base, while the four domes over the arms of the cross had pendentives but no windows. A description in Book 1 of The Buildings by Procopius indicates that all five domes rested on short drums arranged like the first dome of Hagia Sophia. The domes are described by Procopius as "spheroidal" or "spherical", indicating that they were either "full hemispherical domes on pendentives or shallow domes, cospherical with the pendentives (pendentive domes)." The dimensions of the church are not known, but Procopius states that the central dome was smaller than that of Hagia Sophia.

Recorded repairs to Holy Apostles by Basil I between 868 and 881 included buttressing. A homily from the late 9th or early 10th century describes the church as having five domes, with the central dome over the sanctuary decorated with an image of Christ "like heaven overlooking earth", nine angels, and a mosaic circle with "all the symbols and mysteries of the Word's divine dispensation", which may have been scenes from the life of Christ and the Apostles. A 10th century description in an ekphrasis by Constantine of Rhodes, apparently written before any remodeling, mentions the drums and that the central dome included an image of Christ, which was "identified as 'like the sun'". The domes are described by Constantine as "spheres", with the central dome "a sphere cut in half" and the domes over the arms "spherical forms", consistent with a hemispherical dome on pendentives in the center and shallower pendentive domes over the arms.

The domes of Holy Apostles appear to have been radically altered between 944 and 985 by the addition of windowed drums beneath all five domes and by raising the central dome higher than the others. A 12th century ekphrasis with a description of the church by Nicholas Mesarites also survives. Mesarites describes all of the domes as hemispheres, with the central dome having "a series of lines that connected the top of the vault with its base", indicating the central dome was a gored dome or reinforced with ribs. He describes an image of Christ Pantokrator in the central dome. The second most important church in the city after the Hagia Sophia, it fell into disrepair after the Latin occupation of Constantinople between 1204 and 1261 and it was razed to the ground by Mehmed the Conqueror in 1461 to build his Fatih Mosque on the site. Justinian's Basilica of St. John at Ephesus and Venice's St Mark's Basilica are derivative of Holy Apostles. More loosely, the Cathedral of St. Front and the Basilica of Saint Anthony of Padua are also derived from this church.

The Chalke Gate to the Great Palace of Constantinople was destroyed during the Nika riots and rebuilt by Justinian. It was an almost square building with a dome on pendentives. The dome included an image of Justinian and Theodora at the center, surrounded by their court.

Justinian and his successors modernized frontier fortifications throughout the century. The example at Qasr ibn Wardan (564) in the desert of eastern Syria is particularly impressive, containing a governor's palace, barracks, and a church built with techniques and to plans possibly imported from Constantinople. The church dome is unusual in that the pendentives sprang from an octagonal drum, rather than the four main arches, and in that it was made of brick, which was rare in Syria.

== Tiberius II Constantine ==
The Golden Triclinium, or Chrysotriklinos, of the Great Palace of Constantinople served as an audience hall for the Emperor as well as a palace chapel. Nothing of it has survived except descriptions, which indicate that it had a pumpkin dome containing sixteen windows in its webs and that the dome was supported by the arches of eight niches connecting to adjoining rooms in the building's likely circular plan. Alternatively, the building may have been octagonal in plan, rather than circular. The dome seems to have had webs that alternated straight and concave, like those of the dome of Justinian's Church of Saints Sergius and Bacchus, and may have been built about 40 years after that church. The dome may have been made of wood and its interior surface was covered with gold mosaic.

The building was not free-standing and was located at the intersection of the public and private parts of the palace. Smaller windows filled with thin sheets of alabaster may have existed over each of the curtain-covered side niches and below the cornice at the base of the dome. It was begun under Emperor Justin II, completed by his successor Tiberius II, and continued to be improved by subsequent rulers. It was connected to the imperial living quarters and was a space used for assembly before religious festivals, high promotions and consultations, as a banqueting hall, a chapel for the emperor, and a throne room. Never fully described in any of its frequent mentions in Byzantine texts, the room was restricted to members of the court and the "most highly rated foreigners". In the 10th century, the throne in the east niche chamber was directly below an icon of an enthroned Christ. A large chandelier was hung from the center of the dome.

== See also ==
- List of Roman domes
- History of architecture
