= Halkevleri =

Turkish cultural institution

- Leader: Nebiye Merttürk
- Founder: Republican People's Party
- Founded: 19 February 1932
- Preceded by: Turkish Hearths
- Headquarters: Çankaya, Ankara
- Newspaper: sendika.org
- Student wing: Liseli Genç Umut; Öğrenci Kolektifleri
- Women's wing: Halkevci Kadınlar
- Ideology: Çayanism; Socialism; Kemalism (formerly)
- Affiliated with: Republican People's Party (until 1963); Devrimci Yol (allegedly)
- Slogan: Halkın Hakları Var (People Have Rights)

Website
- halkevleri.org.tr

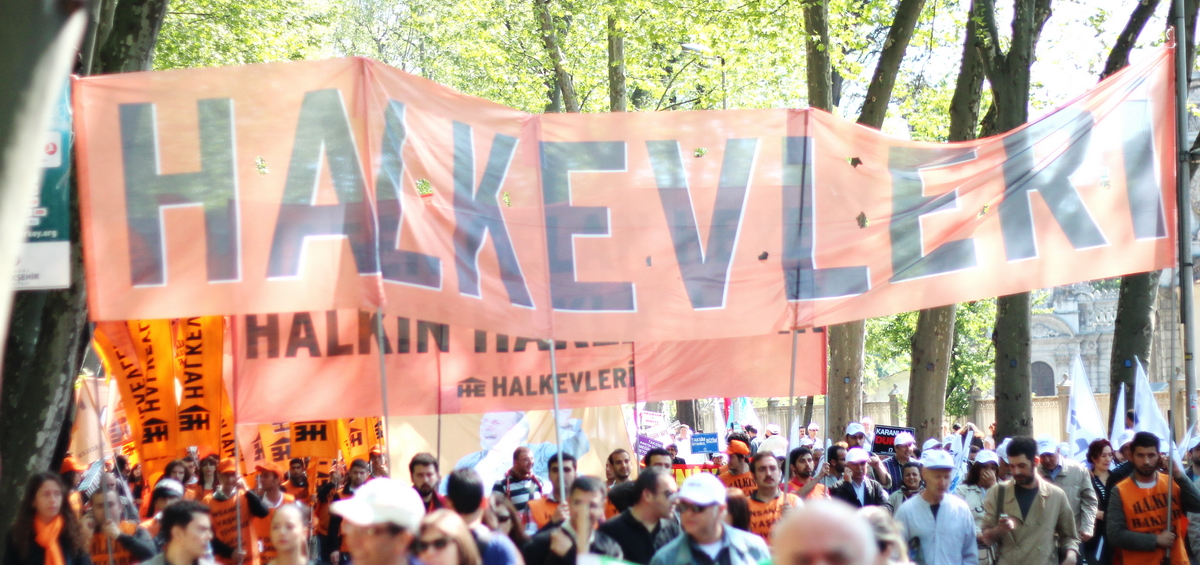
Halkevleri in May Day 2012

Halkevleri (People's Houses), also known as Halkevleri Derneği People's Houses Association, is a Turkish civil society organization that conducts cultural, educational, and political solidarity activities across Turkey, advocating for housing, health, education, environmental, women's, and disability rights.

== History ==
=== First Term (1932-1951) ===
The foundations of Halkevleri were laid after Mustafa Kemal Atatürk toured the country to observe its problems firsthand. Successful models of public education institutions in countries such as Czechoslovakia, Hungary, Russia, and Italy were studied, and it was decided to establish Halkevleri in a form suited to Turkey's own needs and structure. A similar organization, the Turkish Hearths, voted to merge with the Republican People's Party (CHP) at an extraordinary congress on 10 April 1931, and at the CHP's third grand congress in 1931, the decision to open Halkevleri was made.

On 19 February 1932, Halkevleri branches were opened in 14 provincial centers, starting with Ankara, as part of the social and cultural development of the country during the Republican era and to bring Kemalist ideas to wide segments of the population.

Following the elections of 14 May 1950, the Democrat Party, which came to power, initiated legislation in the Grand National Assembly of Turkey. Law No. 5830, adopted on 8 August 1951 and published in the Official Gazette on 11 August 1951, closed all Halkevleri branches across Turkey and transferred their assets to the treasury.

=== 1963-1980 ===
Following the military coup of 27 May 1960, Halkevleri was re-established on 21 April 1963 as an association, operating as an independent democratic mass organization. During this period, Halkevleri were re-established as independent, democratic mass organizations by intellectuals and workers, without state support. With the rise of worker and student movements from the late 1960s onwards, Halkevleri became important centers for organizing social opposition and integrating with the people. Moving from city centers to neighborhoods, the People's House branches transformed into centers nourished by the self-reliance of the working people and deeply rooted in society. Throughout the struggle for independence, democracy, and freedom, which marked the entire period, the People's Houses served as an organization enabling revolutionary movements, working masses, and the general public to act on common ground. Particularly from the mid-1970s onwards, Devrimci Yol conducted its activities in the People's Houses branches.

With the authoritarian coup of 12 September 1980, Halkevleri was again closed and all its assets were once more confiscated. After a seven-year legal process, Halkevleri and its members were acquitted, and in 1987 it resumed activities with a total of 24 branches.

=== 1983-Present ===
The Halkevleri trial, held at the Ankara Martial Law Command's Military Court No. 2, resulted in the acquittal of all defendants on April 11, 1984. The Military Court of Appeals upheld this decision (case number 1984/480, decision number 1984/445) on October 17, 1984. Following this, the Halkevleri Board of Directors applied to the Ankara Civil Court of Peace, requesting the reopening of the People's Houses, a request that was granted on June 23, 1987. The third period of the People's Houses began with the 10th Congress held in Ankara on October 31, 1988.

Halkevleri began their work in 1987 with a total of 24 branches, 18 in Istanbul and 6 in Ankara. The period between 1987 and 1990 was marked by the struggle to heal the wounds of the September 12th coup and to reclaim assets confiscated by the treasury.

In the 1990s, amidst the escalating climate of dirty warfare and the revelation of counter-guerrilla tactics, Halkevleri positioned themselves as a component of the democratic front. During this period, they launched the "Free Education, Free Healthcare" campaigns against the neoliberal transformation implemented first by the Turgut Özal governments and later by coalition governments, working to "raise the people's struggle for rights" and develop solidarity relationships. During this period, Halkevleri defined themselves as "People's Opposition Houses," carrying out political activities "aimed at defending and expanding the fundamental rights of the people, which were usurped and commodified by neoliberalism."

From the mid-2000s onwards, the People's Houses developed a line of struggle called the People's Rights Struggle, focusing on education, health, housing, transportation, and opposing the exploitation of nature, demanding the public provision of these rights. During this period, they fought against transportation price increases and the usurpation of the right to transportation, the construction of hydroelectric power plants in the Eastern Black Sea region and other parts of Turkey and the plundering of nature for profit, housing problems and violations of the right to housing in impoverished neighborhoods, femicides, the government's women's policies, and the increasing problems of workplace safety and worker deaths.

One of the significant activities of the People's Houses from 2006 onwards was the International Workers' Film Festival. The festival, which begins at the start of May each year, is organized in collaboration with various institutions, primarily sendika.org and Sine-Sen, and takes place in different cities throughout the year with the participation of various organizations.

== See also ==
- Urfa Halkevi
