= History of Urfa =

Urfa was founded as a city under the name Edessa by the Seleucid king Seleucus I Nicator in 303 or 302 BC. There is no written evidence for earlier settlement at the site, but Urfa's favorable commercial and geographical placement suggests that there was a smaller settlement present prior to 303 BC. The indigenous Aramaic name for the site prior to the Seleucid period was Orhai or Orhay, which survives as the basis of the city's modern Turkish name. Perhaps Orhai's absence from earlier written sources is due to the settlement having been small and unfortified prior to the Seleucid period. Seleucus named the city Edessa after the ancient capital of Macedonia.

In the late 2nd century, as the Seleucid dynasty disintegrated, it became the capital of the Arab Nabataean Abgar dynasty, which was successively Parthian, Aramean/Syriac kingdom Osroene, Armenian, and Roman client state and eventually a Roman province. Its location on the eastern frontier of the Empire meant it was frequently conquered during periods when the Byzantine central government was weak, and for centuries, it was alternately conquered by Arab, Byzantine, Armenian, and Turkoman rulers. It fell under the rule of the Seljuks until the First Crusade. On 10 March 1098, the Crusader Baldwin of Boulogne induced the final Armenian ruler to adopt him as his successor then, after seizing power, established the first Crusader State in the East, known as the County of Edessa. Unlike other crusaders states, Christian groups such as Armenian Apostolic were allowed to keep their customs and institutions, and a level of religious tolerance was established towards Indigenous Christians, Jews and Muslims.

Urfa was conquered by Imad al-Din Zengi in 1144 after a month-long siege, and from that point the city came under the Zengid dynasty. The last Crusader count of Edessa besieged the city again in 1146 in an attempt to retake it from the Zengids, but only held the city for six days before being defeated by Zangi's son Nur ad-Din. Urfa's population was massacred in the process, and its Christian community never recovered.

After the Zengids, Urfa was ruled by the Kurdish Ayyubid dynasty from 1182 to 1260, when it was captured by the Mongols. In the early 1300s, it became part of the Mamluk Sultanate, and then the Aq Qoyunlu captured it in the early 1400s. The Ottoman Empire took Urfa from the Safavids around 1517 and ruled it until the 20th century. Under Ottoman rule, Urfa was initially was sanjak centre in Diyarbekir Eyalet, lately made capital of Raqqa Eyalet, finally made part of the Aleppo Vilayet. The area became a centre of trade in cotton, leather, and jewellery.

== Prehistory ==
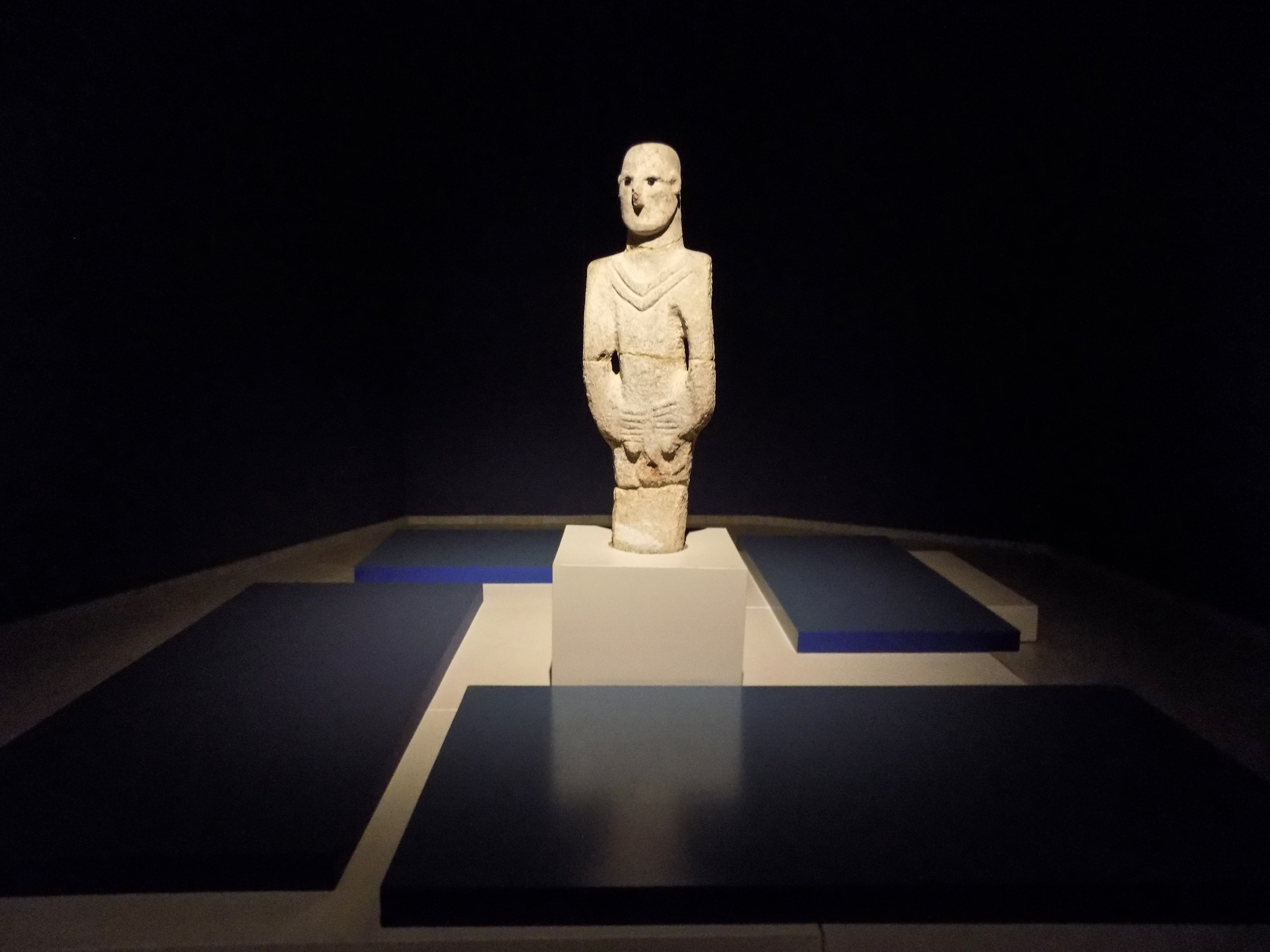
Urfa Man, Pre-Pottery Neolithic, c. 9000 BC. Şanlıurfa Museum.

Urfa shares the Balikh River Valley region with two other significant Neolithic sites at Nevalı Çori and Göbekli Tepe. Settlements in the area originated around 9000 BC as a PPNA Neolithic sites located near Abraham's Pool (Site Name: Balıklıgöl).

In prehistoric times, the Urfa Region was attractive for human habitation because of its dense grazing areas and the presence of wild animals on migration routes. As a result, the area became densely populated, particularly in the Neolithic period.

In Urfa itself, there was a prehistoric settlement at Yeni Mahalle Höyüğü (aka Balıklıgöl Höyüğü), located immediately north of Balıklıgöl in the heart of the old town. Now buried under single-story houses, the site was accidentally discovered during road construction in the 1990s and then excavated in 1997 by the Şanlıurfa Museum Directorate. The findings included flint tools, arrowheads dated to the early Pre-Pottery Neolithic B phase, and two round buildings with terrazzo floors. Animal bones found at the site indicate hunting activity, and charred seed samples indicate that the villagers cultivated wheat and barley. The village at Yeni Mahalle is radiocarbon dated to roughly 9400–8600 BCE.

A much later artifact is a black stone pedestal with a double bull relief, found at a hill called Külaflı Tepe in the former village of Cavşak in the 1950s when the village was being evacuated to build a base for the Urfa Brigade. The pedestal contains an inscription with an invocation to the god Tarhunza and mentions a city whose name is only partly visible, but which Bahattin Çelik restores as "Umalia", in the country of Bit Adini.

== City of Edessa ==
Ancient sources describe Seleucid Edessa as following the typical plan for Hellenistic military colonies: its streets were laid out in a grid pattern, with four main streets that intersected each other. There were four city gates, and the main citadel was outside the walls. Macedonian soldiers were settled in the new city, but they never formed a majority of its population. The city's culture remained predominantly Semitic (specifically Aramaic), and any Hellenization was minimal.

Edessa was an important commercial center in the 3rd and 2nd centuries BC. Previously, the main east–west trade route across Upper Mesopotamia had gone through Harran, but the founding of Edessa caused that route to shift northwards.

The Seleucids declined in the 2nd century BC, and Edessa became the capital of the Abgarid kingdom of Osrhoene in about 132 BC. Originally from Nisibis, the Abgarids appear to have been an Arabized dynasty and may have ruled their kingdom "much as Arab shaikhs, through a council of tribal elders". The Abgarids were generally allied with the Parthian Empire and were under Parthian cultural influence as well.

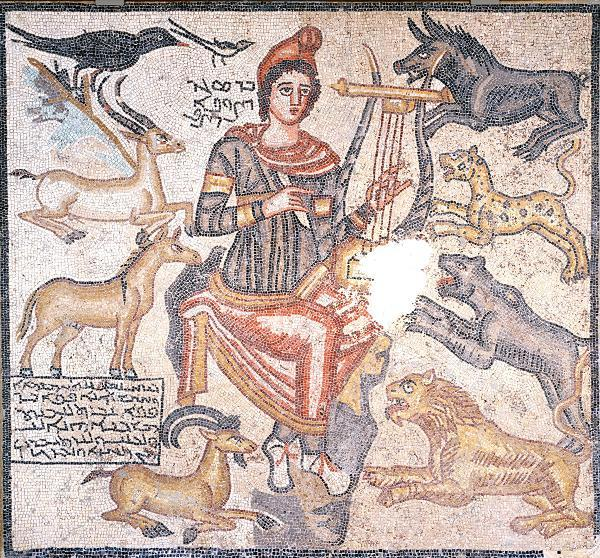
Mosaic of Orpheus from Roman Edessa, c. 200 AD

In the early second century AD, however, the Abgarids came under Roman influence. Abgar VII supported the Roman emperor Trajan's campaign in Mesopotamia and received him "sumptuously" at his court, but later rebelled. In retaliation, the Romans captured and destroyed Edessa, and Abgar VII was killed. The Romans installed a Parthian prince, Parthamaspates, on the Edessan throne as a puppet ruler in 117, but the Abgarids were later restored to power. Similarly, the Parthians captured Edessa in 163 and installed Wa'el bar Sharu as a puppet king. The deposed Ma'nu VIII went to the Romans, who took Edessa in 165 and restored Ma'nu to power. In 166, Osrhoene became a Roman client kingdom.

Ma'nu VIII died in 177 and was succeeded by Abgar VIII, also called Abgar the Great. Abgar sided with Pescennius Niger in his civil war against Septimius Severus. Severus ended up winning that conflict and, as punishment, stripped Abgar of most of his kingdom. Osrhoene now became a Roman province, while Abgar himself was left to rule just Edessa. Abgar mostly retired from international politics and spent the rest of his reign as "one of the Near East's greatest patrons of the arts and learning".

In 201, much of Edessa was destroyed by a major flood. According to the Chronicle of Edessa, over 2,000 people died. Abgar granted a remission of taxes for all who were affected by the flood and immediately began a large-scale reconstruction project of the city after the old Seleucid plan. Abgar repaired the old royal palace by the river, which had been damaged by the flood, but he also built a new palace on higher ground.

In 1979, an archaeological excavation at present-day Çamlık Parkı in central Urfa uncovered seven rock-cut tombs dating back to the first centuries AD. Mosaics on the floor appear to contain portraits of several members of the Abgarid dynasty, possibly including Abgar the Great. The tombs have since been closed back up with the mosaics still inside.

=== Ancient Edessa's diverse religious background ===
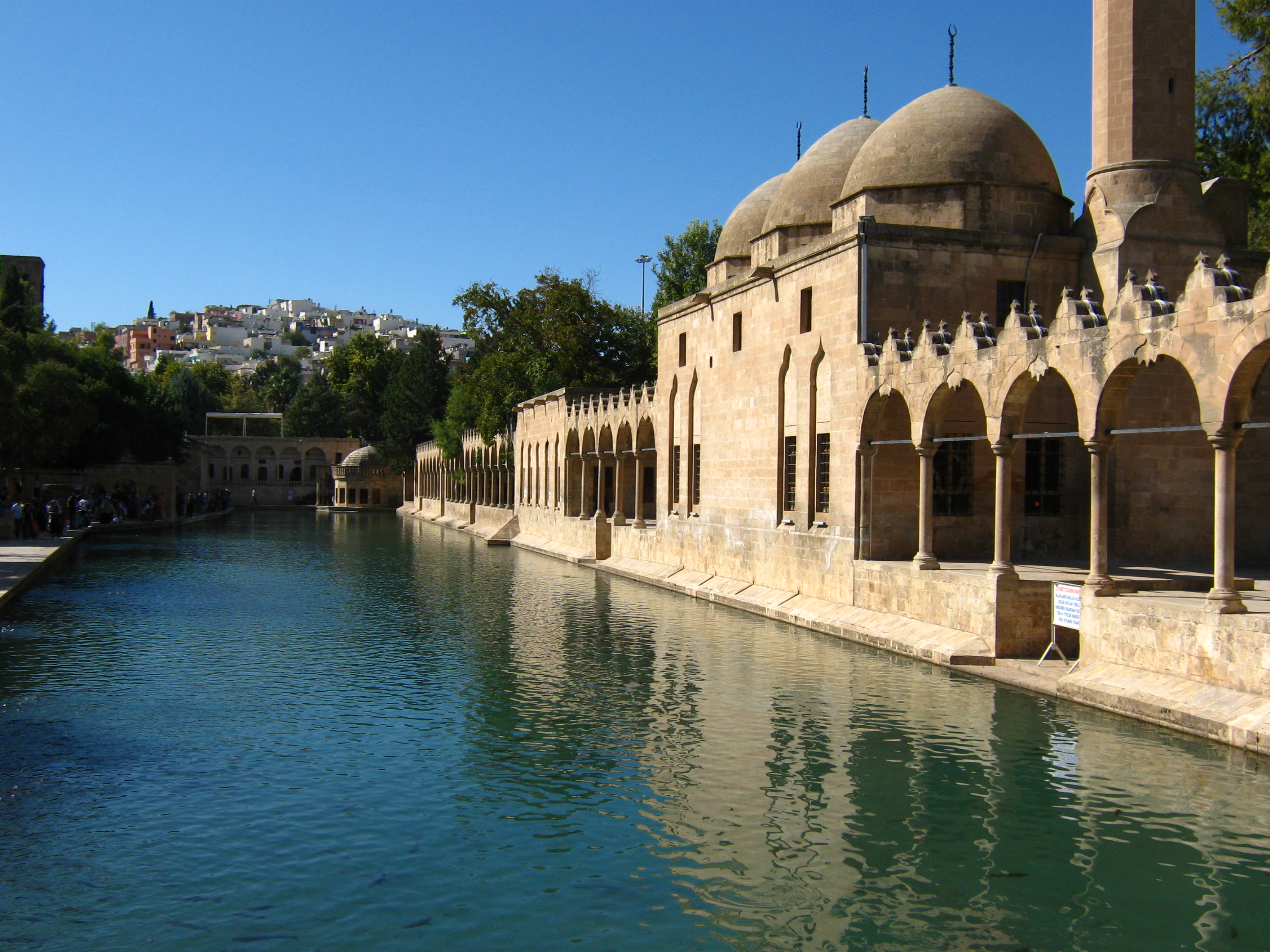
The sacred carp of Balıklıgöl: a tradition which goes back to ancient times

Ancient Edessa was an eclectic melting pot of different religious groups. Unlike Harran, where the cult of the moon god Sin predominated, the people of Edessa worshipped a whole pantheon of gods that can generally be identified with planets. The most important were Nabu and Bel. The cult of the sun and moon that was later known in Harran as the Sabians also had followers in Edessa. The fertility goddess Atargatis, whose cult was based at Manbij, was also worshipped in Edessa. Fish were an important symbol of Atargatis, and in ancient Edessa there was a fish pond filled with sacred carp dedicated to Atargatis – today's Balıklıgöl. Other gods worshipped in pagan Edessa included the Nabataean deity Dushara, the Mesopotamian goddess Ishtar, and also the moon god Sin. Another important cult at Edessa involved the veneration of a virgin mother and her child.

In addition to polytheists, Edessa also had a prominent Jewish community. Many of Edessa's Jews were merchants, involved in long-distance trade between the Persian Gulf and the Mediterranean.

By the end of the 2nd century, a small Christian community had appeared in Edessa. The city's cosmpolitan religious background meant that its people were open and accepting towards this new religion, which just added another element into the mix. Christianity also resonated with several religious themes already present in Edessa – besides the concept of a virgin mother and child, there was also the concept of a divine trinity and a hope for life after death. The people of Edessa were also familiar with monotheism, through exposure to Judaism, and Edessa's Jewish community was probably partly responsible for the rapid spread of Christianity in the city. Abgar the Great reportedly converted to Christianity around the turn of the 3rd century, which if true would make Edessa the first Christian polity in the world. In 232 the relics of Thomas the Apostle were brought from Mylapore, in today's Tamil Nadu in India.

Still more religions joined the mix during the 3rd century. One was the Bardaisanites, founded by the important philosopher Bardaisan who Abgar the Great was a patron of. Another was the Elkesaites, a syncretic religion that combined elements of Christianity, Judaism, and paganism. Its founder, Elkesai, claimed to be a reincarnation of Jesus, and the Elkesaite belief in reincarnation is possibly a sign of Buddhist influence. The prophet Mani was an Elkesaite before founding Manichaeism – another syncretic religion that "found ready ground in Edessa". There was already an active Manichaean community in Edessa during Mani's lifetime: there is a reference in the Cologne Mani Codex to a letter he wrote to his followers in Edessa. Manichaeism's spread to Edessa was attributed to two of Mani's disciples named Addai and Thomas. Edessa's Manichaean community remained prominent until the 5th century.

=== Edessa under Roman rule ===
Abgar the Great died in 212 and was succeeded by Abgar IX, also called Severus as a sign of Roman influence. Abgar IX only reigned for a year – in 213, he was summoned to Rome by the emperor Caracalla, who then had him murdered. In 214, Caracalla made Edessa a Roman colony, officially ending any autonomy the city had. A son of Abgar IX, known as Ma'nu IX, appears to have been nominally a king until 240; he received an embassy from India in 218, during the reign of Elagabalus, but he did nothing else of note. The monarchy seems to have been restored to power at some point – and Abgar IX was apparently king until 248, when the emperor Philip the Arab had him banished after Edessa rebelled.

In 260, the Sasanian emperor Shapur I defeated the Romans in the Battle of Edessa and captured the emperor. However, either Shapur never actually captured the city or he only held it for a very short time – it is not listed among the cities he captured in his inscription on the Ka'ba-ye Zartosht, and in the aftermath of the battle he had to bribe Edessa's garrison to let his army pass unmolested.

As a result of Diocletian's reorganization of the empire in 293, a state-run factory was built at Edessa to make weapons and equipment for the soldiers stationed along the border. In 298, after Galerius Maximianus's victory over the Sasanians, Edessa was made capital of the new province of Osrhoene. It served as a military base in the Mesopotamian limes, although it was secondary to Nisibis in that system.

=== Edessa during late antiquity ===
In the 4th through 6th centuries AD, Edessa went through arguably its period of greatest prosperity. It was again an important commercial center, and merchants grew rich on trade in luxury goods from the east, particularly silk. As with later periods, the city had a council of notable citizens who were at least partly in charge of local government and administration. In the 5th century there were three different theological schools in Edessa: the School of the Syrians (affiliated with the patriarchate of Antioch), the School of the Armenians, and the famous School of the Persians (whose teachers were not actually Persians but rather members of the Church of the East). The School of the Persians was closed down in 489 and its staff relocated to Nisibis. There were many churches in the city and monasteries in the area. Just outside the walls were several infirmaries and hospitals.

When the Roman emperor Jovian surrendered Nisibis to the Sasanians in 363, an influx of refugees came to Edessa, including many Christians. One of these refugees was the writer and theologian Ephrem the Syrian, who was a co-founder of the School of the Persians in Edessa. According to T.A. Sinclair, as Christianity gained more of a presence in Edessa, the pagan planet-worshippers increasingly emigrated to Harran.

By the early 6th century, a small lake had formed on the west side of the city. In 525, a flood destroyed part of the western city wall and damaged some of the city. Afterwards, a deep ditch was dug on the north and east sides of the city to act as a flood channel. In normal weather, a low dam kept the Daisan river in its original course, but if the dam overflowed, then the floodwaters would flow through the artificial channel instead of into the city. At some point later on, the flood channel became the normal course of the river.

Edessa successfully held out during a siege in 544. In 609, however, the Sasanian emperor Khosrow II captured Edessa during his campaign in Mesopotamia. Many of the city's Monophysites were deported to Iran. In 628, the Byzantine emperor Heraclius captured Edessa.

== Age of Islam ==
Urfa surrendered to the Rashidun general Iyad ibn Ghanm in 639 without resistance, supposedly when Iyad "stood at its gate riding a brown horse" according to al-Baladhuri. Several versions of the terms of surrender appear in historical sources, mentioning the citizens would be responsible for "repairing 'bridges and roads'". The pact also guaranteed that the city's Christians would keep ownership of the cathedral. Sometime shortly after Urfa submitted to Muslim rule, a mosque was built in the city, although its location is unknown.

In the early centuries of Arab rule, and particularly under the Umayyads, Urfa was still a major Christian city. It formed part of the province of Diyar Mudar. The city reportedly had 300 or 360 churches, and there were many monasteries. The population was mostly Syrian Orthodox but with significant Melkite and Jewish minorities; there were relatively few Muslims. The city was led by a group of distinguished citizens, including magnates and agricultural landowners, who "formed a partly self-governing body" that dealt with the caliphal government rather than the bishop. Some of the leading families in this period included the Gūmāyē, the Telmaḥrāyē, and the Ruṣāfāyē.

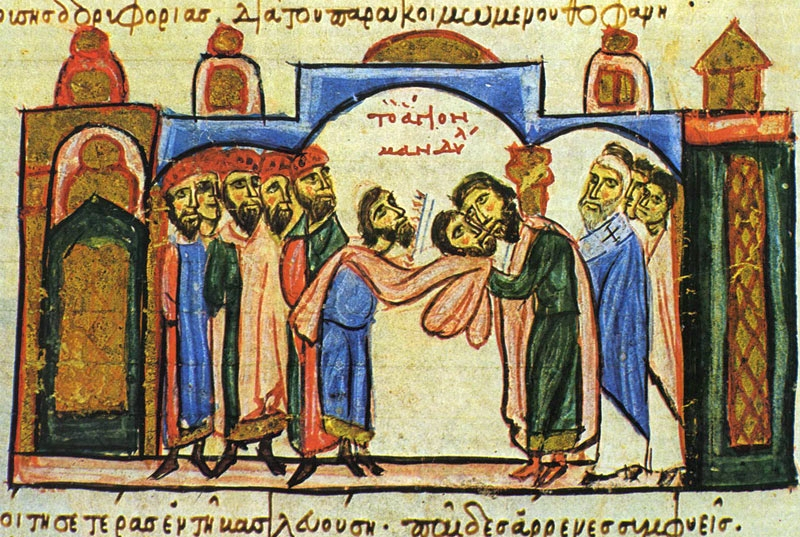
Image from the Chronicle of John Skylitzes showing the surrender of the Mandylion to the Byzantine army in 943.

During the reign of the Abbasid caliph al-Mansur, the city walls were demolished after the local Muslim governor revolted. The old walls had already been damaged by floods in the 7th and 8th centuries. In 812, Urfa's citizens had to pay a large sum to the anti-Abbasid rebel Nasr ibn Shabath al-Uqayli to prevent him from attacking the unprotected city. Afterwards, the citizens had new defensive walls built around the city. According to Bar Hebraeus, the walls were commissioned by someone named Abu Shaykh and paid for by the citizens. The walls and towers visible today belong to this rebuilding effort, albeit with later renovations. The citadel was likely begun at the same time, probably with the addition of a moat on the south side.

When the caliph al-Ma'mun came to power in 813, he dispatched his general Tahir ibn Husayn to Urfa to put down Nasr ibn Shabath's rebellion. The rebels besieged Tahir's forces in Urfa, but the local civilians (one of them was the future Syriac church leader Dionysius I Telmaharoyo) supported the soldiers and the siege was unsuccessful. Tahir's troops later mutinied, however, and he was forced to flee to Raqqa; he later appointed someone named 'Abd al-A'la as governor of Urfa. In 825, while Tahir's son Abdallah was governor of al-Jazira, his brother Muhammad enacted a series of anti-Christian policies in Urfa. He ordered the destruction of several churches, claiming that they had illegally been built after the Muslim conquest. That same year, he also had a new mosque built in the tetrapylon in front of the city's Melkite cathedral. Before its conversion into a mosque, the tetrapylon had been a meeting place for church leaders. The locations of the mosque and cathedral are unknown.

In the spring of 943, the Byzantine army campaigned in upper Mesopotamia, capturing several cities and either threatening Urfa or, according to Symeon Magister, besieging it outright. The Byzantines demanded that the mandylion (called al-mandīl in Arabic), by now a famous Christian relic, be handed over to the emperor. In return, the city would be spared and 200 Muslim prisoners would be released. With permission from the caliph al-Muttaqi, the people of Edessa handed over the mandylion and signed a truce with the Byzantines. The mandylion was translated to Constantinople; it arrived "triumphantly" on 15 August 944.

== 11th century ==
The Numayrid emir Waththab ibn Sabiq declared independence in 990 and annexed Edessa early in his reign. Waththab appointed his cousin 'Utayr as governor of the city. 'Utayr installed someone named Ahmad ibn Muhammad as his na'ib (deputy) here, but then later had him assassinated. This evidently made 'Utayr unpopular with the locals, since Ahmad had treated them well. In 1025/6 (416 AH), the city's inhabitants rebelled and appealed to Nasr ad-Dawla, the Marwanid emir of Diyar Bakr. At first, Nasr ad-Dawla appointed someone named Zangi to be his deputy in Edessa, but Zangi died in 1027. Meanwhile, 'Utayr had been assassinated. This time, Nasr ad-Dawla ended up appointing two deputies to jointly control Edessa: he chose 'Utayr's son, known only by the nasab "Ibn 'Utayr", to be in charge of the main citadel, while he appointed a different Numayrid named Shibl ad-Dawla to be in charge of the smaller citadel – i.e. the converted east gate, now the Bey Kapısı.

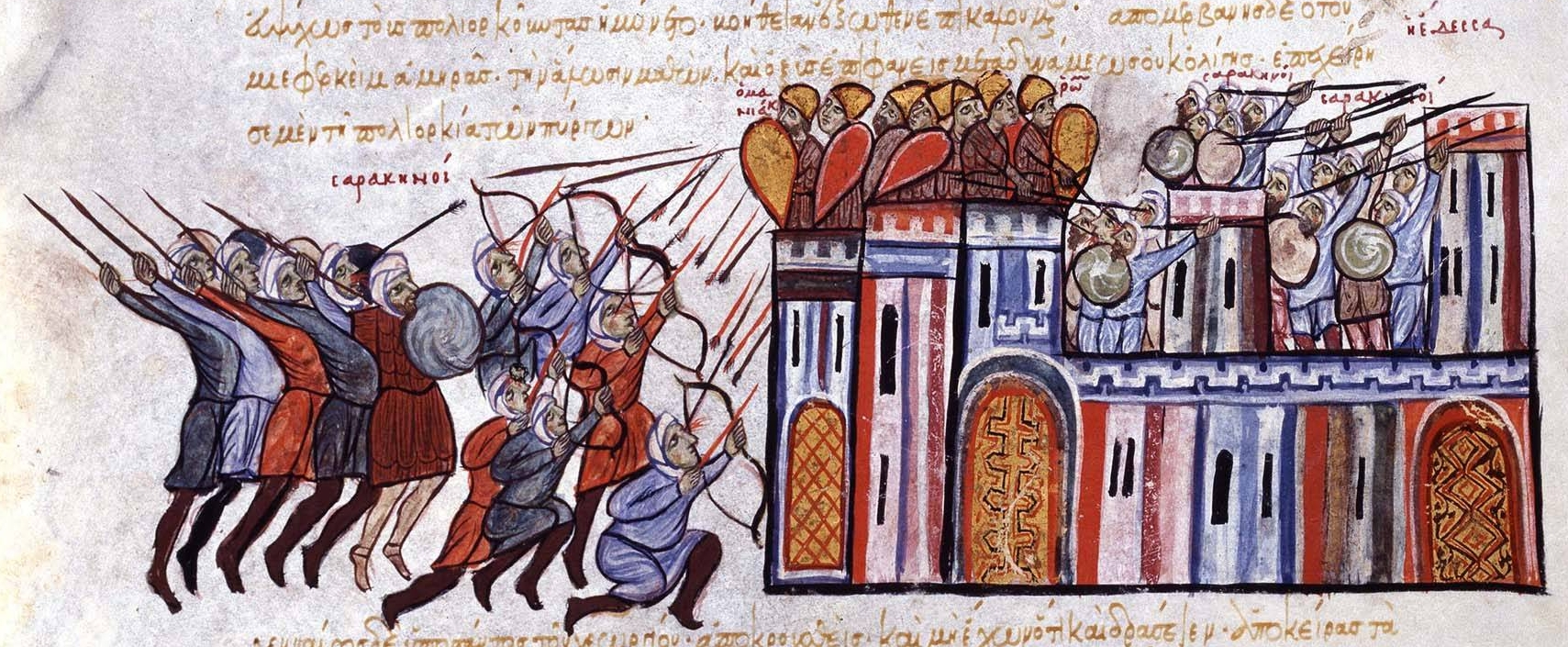
Miniature from the History of John Skylitzes showing George Maniakes defending Edessa from Nasr ad-Dawla's counterattack.

In October 1031, the Byzantine general George Maniakes conquered Edessa. This would ultimately be the last significant territorial acquisition by the Byzantine Empire in Mesopotamia. The accounts of this event differ heavily. According to one version, Ibn 'Utayr had entered into negotiations with Maniakes, intending to sell him the citadel. His desire to sell was apparently motivated by a threat from Shibl ad-Dawla. In John Skylitzes's version, however, Maniakes had bribed Salman, a deputy of Nasr ad-Dawla's, into surrendering the city to him in the middle of the night. If this was the case, then Salman either had some authority over Ibn 'Utayr or had otherwise deposed him.

Whoever Maniakes had been negotiating with, Byzantine forces gained control of some of the fortifications but not the rest of the city. Exactly which parts Maniakes had taken control of are unclear – Skylitzes described Maniakes had taken possession of "three heavily fortified towers", but his description of Edessa's geography is completely inaccurate and he clearly had never been to the city himself. Matthew of Edessa's account, which is more reliable, mentions "three citadels"; according to Tara Andrews, the upper citadel must have been one of them. According to T.A. Sinclair, Maniakes had already gained control of the upper citadel. That winter, Nasr ad-Dawla came with an army in an attempt to drive out the Byzantines. Nasr ad-Dawla tried to besiege the Byzantine positions but was unsuccessful and decided to loot the city and tear down buildings, then burn the city to the ground while retreating with camels carrying off precious objects. According to Skylitzes, Maniakes was able to then capture the citadel and, summoning external reinforcements, secure the whole city.

Maniakes remained in charge of Edessa for several years and, according to Honigmann and Bosworth, appears to have been relatively autonomous from the Byzantines, merely sending an annual tribute to Constantinople. On the other hand, while Skylitzes does mention that "Maniakes sent an annual tribute of 50 pounds [of gold] to the emperor", Niccolò Zorzi remarks that this "does not necessarily imply that Edessa 'enjoyed a certain amount of independence from Byzantium'". The citadel became known as "Maniakes's citadel" at some point.

In May 1036, the Numayri prince Ibn Waththab plundered the city and took the patricius of Edessa as prisoner, but the fortress remained in the hands of the Byzantine garrison. A peace treaty was reached in 1037; under its terms, Edessa came directly under Byzantine control and it was refortified. Edessa now became an important Byzantine command placed under a series of katepanos and dukes. The "duchy" of Edessa probably comprised the whole area beyond the Euphrates under their control with several fortresses north of the river. The city "was still inhabited by many Christians" at this point.

In 1065–6 and 1066–7, the city was attacked by the Turkish leader Khurasan-Salar. For 50 days beginning on 10 March 1071, Urfa was besieged by the Seljuk sultan Alp Arslan. Alp Arslan eventually lifted the siege in return for a large payment and possibly also the submission of its ruler, the doux Basilios Alousianos (son of Alusian of Bulgaria). After the Battle of Manzikert, Edessa was intended to be handed over to the Seljuks, but the Byzantine emperor Romanos Diogenes was deposed and in the political chaos its katepano Paulus ended up siding with the new emperor.

In 1077 or 1078, Basil Apokapes besieged and captured Edessa, displacing the Byzantine governor Leo Diabatenos. He was an agent of Philaretos Brachamios, the main Byzantine agent in the region who governed from Marash; however, Basil ruled Edessa independently. In 1081–2, an amir named Khusraw unsuccessfully besieged the city. After Basil's death in 1083, the citizens of Edessa elected an Armenian named Smbat to succeed him. Smbat was in charge for six months before Philaretos came in person on 23 September 1083. He appointed a Greek eunuch as governor and gave him the title parakoimomenos; this eunuch was later assassinated by an official named Barsauma.

However, Edessa was in a particularly vulnerable position "caught between two blocks of Uqaylid territory", and it was particularly vulnerable to the Seljuks. In 1086–7, the Seljuk sultan Malik Shah I sent his general Buzan to take the city while he himself campaigned in Syria. A three-month siege followed, with Barsauma defending the city. The city surrendered in March 1087 and Buzan appointed a Seljuk commander to head the citadel. At some point, an Armenian named Toros in charge of the city administration – according to the Syriac Chronicle of 1234, this happened in 1087, while Matthew of Edessa wrote that it happened after Buzan's death in 1094. Toros appears to have begun a rebuilding project on the Bey Kapısı fortress, but it wasn't finished until after his rule. Meanwhile, Malik Shah had died in 1092 and a Seljuk dynastic crisis had broken out. In 1094, Malik Shah's brother Tutush demanded the city's surrender, but both Toros and the Seljuk citadel commander refused. Tutush's forces seized the citadel and made their encampment on the west side of the city. Fearing an attack from them, Toros apparently tried to cut the citadel off by building a wall between it and the city. After Tutush died in 1095, however, his forces abandoned the citadel and Toros now took control of the whole city as a de facto independent ruler.

During the 11th century, there was a large influx of Armenian immigrants into the region, especially the towns. In Urfa, they supplanted Syrians as the leading citizens and wealthiest landowners.

== County of Edessa ==
A map of the County of Edessa

Urfa was capital of the crusader County of Edessa for about half a century beginning in 1098. The crusaders' subjects were a mix of Armenians and Syrians. In Urfa itself, Armenians were the dominant group. The crusaders themselves don't seem to have undertaken much construction in Urfa. The only extant structure that can be attributed to them is the southernmost tower of the Bey Kapısı, on the east side of the city walls. This was completing the rebuilding that Toros had begun before the crusaders seized Edessa and was finished in 1122–3, while the count Joscelin I was in captivity at Harput.

=== Sieges of 1144 and 1146 ===
The County of Edessa had survived largely because their Muslim rivals were disunited. The rise of a single powerful Muslim rival – namely Imad ad-Din Zangi, the crafty atabeg of Mosul – spelled disaster for the county. The tipping point came in late 1144, when Joscelin II left Edessa with a big chunk of his soldiers to assist Zengi's rival Kara Arslan.

Upon becoming aware of the city's weakness, Zengi led a series of forced marches and laid siege to the city on 24 November. By 24 December, he had successfully gained entry to the city; the citadel fell two days later on the 26th. Zengi's forces spared the native Christian population and their churches, but the Franks were killed and their churches destroyed. Zengi then appointed Zayn ad-Din Ali Küçük, the commander of his guard, as governor of the city.

The fall of Edessa was a direct motivator for the Second Crusade. Christian pilgrims returning to Europe brought news of the city's conquest, and emissaries from the crusader states also came to appeal for help. The pope responded by issuing the papal bull Quantum praedecessores on 1 December 1145, which directly called for another crusade. Meanwhile, in the Muslim world, news of this victory made Zengi a hero. The caliph gave him many gifts and titles, including al-malik al-mansūr – "the victorious king".

In May 1146, there was a plot by Urfa's Armenian community to overthrow the Turks and restore the city to Joscelin II. The Turks suppressed this plot and settled 300 Jewish families in the city. However, after Zengi was assassinated on 14 September 1146, the Armenians again conspired with Joscelin II to take the city. Sometime in October, Joscelin II and Baldwin of Marash came and laid siege to the city. This second siege proved far more destructive than the first. The Franks succeeded in entering the city, but they were not properly equipped for a siege of the main citadel. During their six-day-long reoccupation of Urfa, the Franks indiscriminately looted shops belonging to Christians and Muslims alike. The city's Muslims either fled to Harran or took shelter in the citadel with the Turkish garrison.

Meanwhile, Imad ad-Din's successor Nur ad-Din Zengi had arrived with an army of 10,000 soldiers and surrounded the city. When the Franks realized they were trapped, they attempted to retreat, but it ended in disaster and they were slaughtered as they tried to escape. Moreover, the city's population was massacred – the men were put to death, while the women and children were sold into slavery. The city's Christian community, one of the oldest in the world, had been destroyed and never recovered.

== Zengid rule ==
Although Nur ad-Din was an active builder elsewhere, only one building at Urfa can be attributed to him: the "rather plain" Great Mosque, which was probably on the site of an earlier church.

After Nur ad-Din's death in 1174, Urfa was captured by his nephew Sayf al-Din Ghazi II.

== Ayyubid dynasty ==
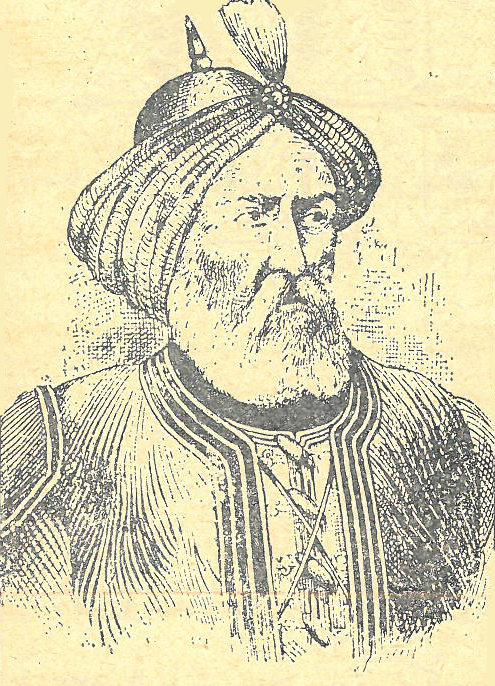
Saladin captured Urfa in 1182 after a siege, but the citadel continued to hold out and required a second siege.

Saladin captured Urfa in 1182 after a siege; he then separately besieged the citadel. He ended up paying the defenders off to let him take control of the citadel. He then appointed Muzaffar al-Din Gökböri as governor of Urfa along with Harran. During Saladin's reign, the cathedral of the Melkites was demolished. Part was used as building material for Urfa's citadel, and part was taken to Harran.

The Ayyubid empire essentially functioned as a dynastic "confederation of principalities united under one leading prince". During Saladin's reign, he established a principality based at Harran; Urfa was part of this principality. After Gökböri, the Harran-Urfa principality was also held by Saladin's brother al-Adil, who later ruled as the Ayyubid sultan himself.

During Ayyubid rule, Edessa had a population of approximately 24,000, according to J.C. Russell's estimate (Russell generally favored smaller, more conservative estimates).

In June 1234, the city was taken by the Seljuk sultan Kayqubad I's army, and its inhabitants were deported to Anatolia. However, it was recaptured within four months by the Ayyubid ruler al-Kamil. Sometime shortly thereafter, the citadel was slighted on al-Kamil's orders.

== Mongol rule ==
In 1260, Urfa voluntarily submitted to the troops of Hulagu and thus came under Mongol rule. Because the city had surrendered peacefully, its inhabitants were spared.

The Mongols never garrisoned Urfa; it was near their western border with the Mamluk Sultanate and was probably seen as "too difficult to defend". Its ruined fortress was "probably not thought worth repairing". The city was desolate at this point; its inhabitants had evacuated or abandoned it and "only Turcoman nomads lived in the otherwise empty city".

== Mamluk rule ==
The Mamluks gained control of Urfa sometime in the early 14th century. They renovated the ruined citadel probably during the third reign of an-Nasir Muhammad (1309–40), but the city "attracted few inhabitants". The Mamluk garrison only occupied the citadel itself; the surrounding city was still practically deserted and not worth committing any soldiers to defend. Located close to the Mamluks' eastern frontier, Urfa had "no commercial importance" because merchant traffic in Upper Mesopotamia was taking a route through Mardin and Ra's al-'Ayn rather than through Amid and Urfa.

That changed in the late 14th century, toward the end of the Mamluk period. Some commercial traffic had begun passing through Urfa en route to Aleppo, and the city became at least partly repopulated. By around 1400, al-Qalqashandi wrote that Urfa had been rebuilt and was prosperous again. Meanwhile, in 1394, Timur occupied Urfa without much resistance; he "admired the buildings and took away some of the portable wealth".

== Aq Qoyunlu ==
The Aq Qoyunlu took over Urfa in the early 15th century. They apparently regarded it as a strategic military outpost on their western frontier. The citadel was again repaired, and the Hasan Paşa Camii may date to this period as well. The Aq Qoyunlu took it in perhaps the late 1410s or early 1420s. At some point, the Aq Qoyunlu ruler Kara Osman granted Urfa to his son Ali. But due to Ali's quarrels with his brothers beginning in autumn 1428, and the brothers wrote Kara Osman, Kara Osman got upset with Ali and relieved him of his post. Instead, he appointed one of the brothers, Habil, as governor of Urfa.

Ali left Urfa in 1429 and headed north, where he ended up besieging Harput. The governor of Harput wrote to the Mamluk sultan, al-Ashraf Barsbay, for assistance, offering to give him control of Harput in return. Barsbay agreed and began mustering an army in Damascus, but while his forces were still gathering Harput surrendered to Ali. With their primary objective undermined, the Mamluks decided to attack Urfa instead. This way, they could eliminate an Aq Qoyunlu base that could be used to attack Mamluk-held Aleppo.

One day before the main Mamluk army arrived, a "local Arab contingent" reached Urfa and fought a battle against Habil's Turkic forces. They were defeated. The Mamluk army arrived the next day and began a siege of the city. On 24 July, the citadel surrendered, and the Mamluks sacked the city. They demolished the fortress, enslaved the women and children who lived in the city, and killed many others. Habil himself was captured and taken to Egypt in chains. Contemporary historians compared the violent event to Timur's sack of Damascus in 1400.

About a decade later, Urfa was involved in the civil war between Ali Beg's son Jahangir and Jahangir's uncle Hamza for control of the Aq Qoyunlu. The contemporary historian Tihrani Isfahani wrote that Hamza's troops besieged Urfa but did not elaborate. Jahangir ended up making Urfa his main base at some point, from which he attacked Hamza in Erzincan and then later sent a raid against Ergani. Urfa was then the site of a battle in 1451, where Uzun Hasan successfully defeated other Aq Qoyunlu leaders shortly before gaining control of the tribal confederation as a whole. In 1462–3, under Uzun Hasan's reign, Urfa's citadel was renovated.

In early November 1480, a large Mamluk army under Yashbak min Mahdi, who was dawātdār-i kabīr or executive secretary to the Mamluk sultan Qaitbay, laid siege to Urfa. Yashbak bombarded the city walls with heavy cannon fire and used catapults to hurl fireballs into the city. This happened during the Islamic holy month of Ramadan, prompting Fazlallah Khunji Isfahani to liken Yashbak's actions to the tyrant Nimrod torturing the prophet Abraham with fire – also in Urfa, according to tradition. Aq Qoyunlu forces quickly arrived at Urfa from Diyar Bakr and, after a failed attempt at negotiations, a pitched battle took place. The Aq Qoyunlu army's right wing was commanded by Sulayman Beg Bijan and the left wing was commanded by Khalil Beg Mawsillu. The Mamluk forces were utterly defeated, and Yashbak was later executed. (Note: Contemporary sources give conflicting dates for when this battle took place. According to Ibn al-Himsi, it took place on 19 November; according to al-Sayrafi, 17 November; according to the anonymous Chronicle of Bar Hebraeus, 23 November.)

== Ottoman period ==
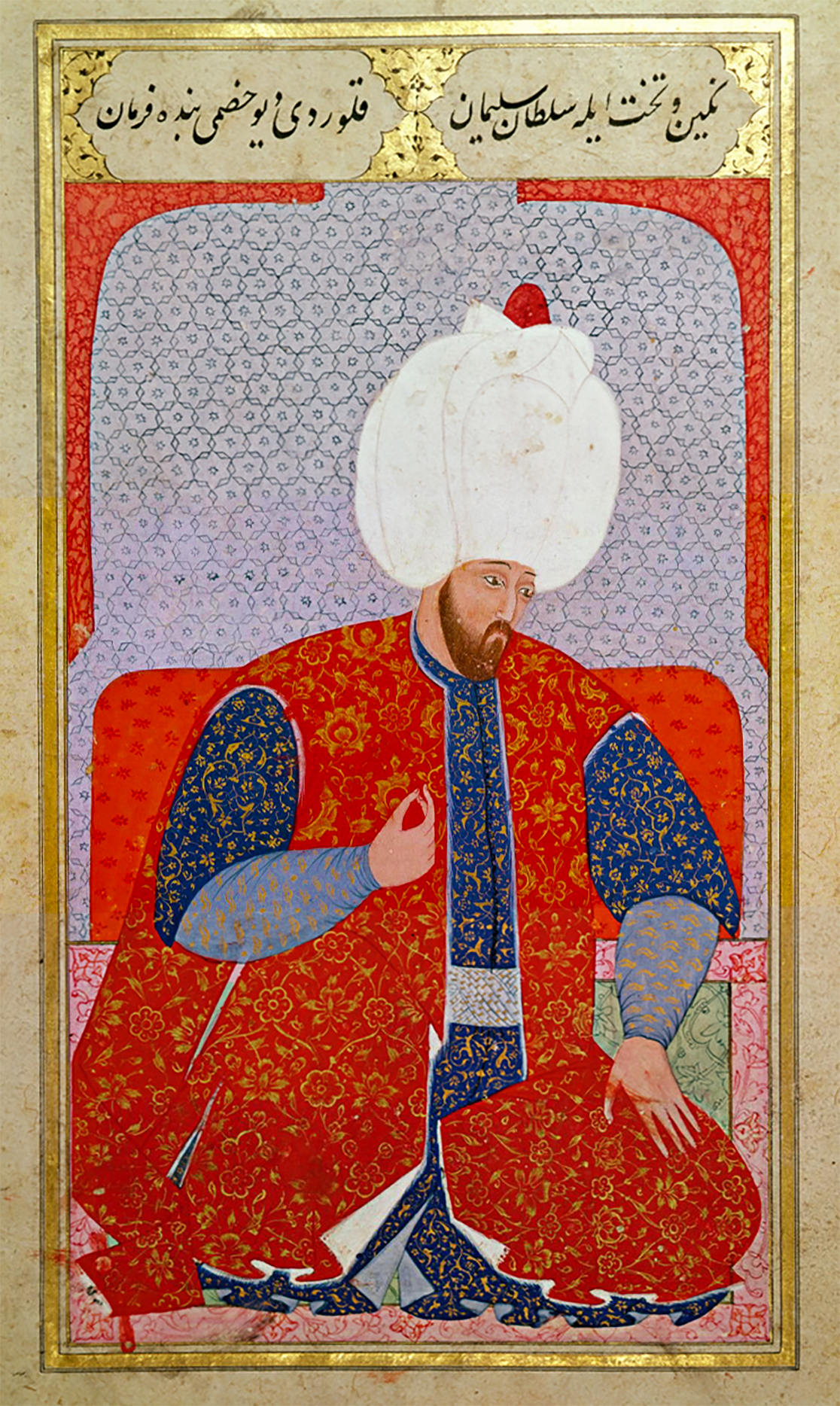
Suleiman the Magnificent's conquest of Baghdad in 1534 indirectly boosted commerce in Urfa by making regional trade routes safer to travel.

Urfa was likely initially incorporated into the Ottoman Empire during the rule of Selim I around 1517. The earliest surviving Ottoman tax register for Urfa, compiled in 1518, documented 1,082 families (700 Muslim and 382 Christian), suggesting a total population slightly exceeding 5,500 people. The relatively low population figure can be attributed to political turmoil in the region, particularly the ongoing conflict with Safavid Iran. By 1526, the city's population had increased to 1,322 families (988 Muslim and 334 Christian), indicating an estimated population of approximately 8,000.

Urfa experienced a renaissance under Ottoman rule. Industry and commerce picked back up, and its population rebounded, although it never reached the same population heights it had once held in the classical and early medieval periods. The high point lasted for about a century and a half, beginning with its conquest by the Ottomans. According to Mehmet Adil Saraç, Urfa's population first became majority Turkish sometime during this period, sometime between 1520 and 1570.

One important event that contributed to the upswing in commerce was Süleyman the Magnificent's successful Mesopotamian campaign against Safavid Iran in 1534–36, which took Baghdad and increased the security of trade routes in Urfa's region. By 1566, a tax register shows the city with an estimated 13,000 to 14,000 people (1,704 Muslim families and 866 Christian families). At this point, the city was described as having five large mahalles, each named after one of the five city gates, and it "must have had an active textile industry". A bedestan is also recorded.

Urfa's prosperity in the 1500s was based on both trade and agricultural production. In the countryside, there was a major "expansion of cultivated and inhabited land", resulting in abundant harvests reaching the city's markets. Meanwhile, the caravan trade continued to stimulate commercial activity – Urfa was an important entrepot on trade routes between Iran and Aleppo.

Because of its prosperity, Urfa's population grew as it attracted residents from nearby cities. In 1571, a government report indicated that most of the government employees under the governor of Diyarbakır were actually living in Urfa instead. In 1586, Ottoman authorities created the Eyalet of Raqqa out of territories that had previously belonged to the Eyalet of Diyarbekir, and Urfa became "the center of economic and political power" in this new province.

At the same time, the city's prosperity attracted bandits and nomadic tribes. A report from October 1565 indicates that the wealthy, populous villages around Urfa were suffering from banditry, and another report from November 1588 indicates that there was a large-scale uprising of Bedouin tribes in the region. For most of the 1500s, this was mostly a rural problem; Urfa itself was mostly unaffected. That changed at the end of the century, when the revolt of Karayazıcı Abdulhalim turned Urfa into a battlefield.

Relatively little is known about Karayazıcı, but he was presumably a tribesman who worked as a bureaucrat in the local administration (Yazıcı means "scribe"). His army was recruited from other local tribal members. In 1599–1600 (1008 AH), Karayazıcı's army laid siege to the outer and then inner citadel and thus gained control of Urfa. The contemporary historian Mustafa Selaniki blamed Urfa's fall on the governors of Aleppo and Damascus failing to send reinforcements in time.

Karayazıcı's plan seems to have been to capture the citadel quickly in order to gain access to guns and ammunition that would enable his forces to resist Ottoman reinforcements. He set up a "quasi-state" based at Urfa's inner citadel, declaring himself sultan and Hüseyin Pasha (who had worked with him to capture the citadel) as grand vizier. Eventually, though, Ottoman troops (backed by reinforcements from Damascus and Aleppo) surrounded the inner citadel, dug trenches, and engaged the rebels in a bloody battle in the middle of the city. The rebels ran into ammunition shortages during the battle and had to melt down coins to use as bullets. Hüseyin Pasha was killed in the battle, but Karayazıcı himself managed to escape.

The instability accompanying the Celali revolts, and especially Karayazıcı's occupation of the city, must have sapped Urfa's prosperity. Several 17th-century accounts refer to parts of the town as being in disrepair. For example, when Jean-Baptiste Tavernier visited Urfa in 1644, "there were so many empty lots that [he] compared the town to a desert". The central Ottoman state's control of the surrounding Raqqa Eyalet weakened significantly in the early 1600s. Powerful ümera families from Urfa assumed responsibility for governance of the eyalet, while the actual office of governor was a sinecure for prominent Ottoman generals or their sons.

Urfa court records from about 1629 to 1631 (1039–40 AH) provide insight into local government during the Ottoman-Safavid War of 1623–1629. The Ottomans were in the process of mobilizing troops and resources in the area for the war effort, and the qadi of Urfa was responsible for billeting troops and gathering provisions. In August 1638, Sultan Murad IV stayed at Urfa along with his army while en route to Baghdad in the final campaign of the war. He ordered restoration work on the citadel, which is mentioned in written sources and confirmed by an inscription on the walls that still exists.

The most detailed account of early Ottoman Urfa was written by Evliya Çelebi, who visited the city in 1646. Part of his interest may have been because one of his relatives was a qadi here. His account mentions only three gates, with different names than those of the 1566 tax register. Evliya wrote that he counted 2,600 houses in the fortified part of the city, which probably indicates a population total similar to 1566. At this point, Urfa had houses generally made of mud brick; more opulent houses, belonging to paşas and qadis, had their own gardens and baths. Evliya also recorded 22 mosques, 3 medreses, and 3 zaviyes. He listed several hans, including the Yemiş Hânı, the Samsatkapısı, the Hacı İbrâhim Hânı, the Beykapısı Hânı, and the Sebîl Hânı. He also wrote that the city had 400 shops and several mills, including one named after one Tayyaroğlu Ahmed Paşa. However, he was apparently unimpressed by the city's shops and markets.

Evliya also wrote that Urfa had a tannery that produced high-quality yellow maroquin leather. Tavernier also noted the city's leather, saying that along with Tokat and Diyarbakır it produced some of the best maroquin leathers. Besides leather, Urfa was also renowned for its cotton fabrics during this period.

According to Onur Usta, part of why Urfa appeared to European visitors as "a derelict city with houses reduced to rubble" during this period was because it had a lot of residents from nomadic and tribal backgrounds. These people would have still engaged in nomadic transhumance activities during most parts of the year and "only needed a roof over their heads during the winter". The abandoned-looking houses would have belonged to them.

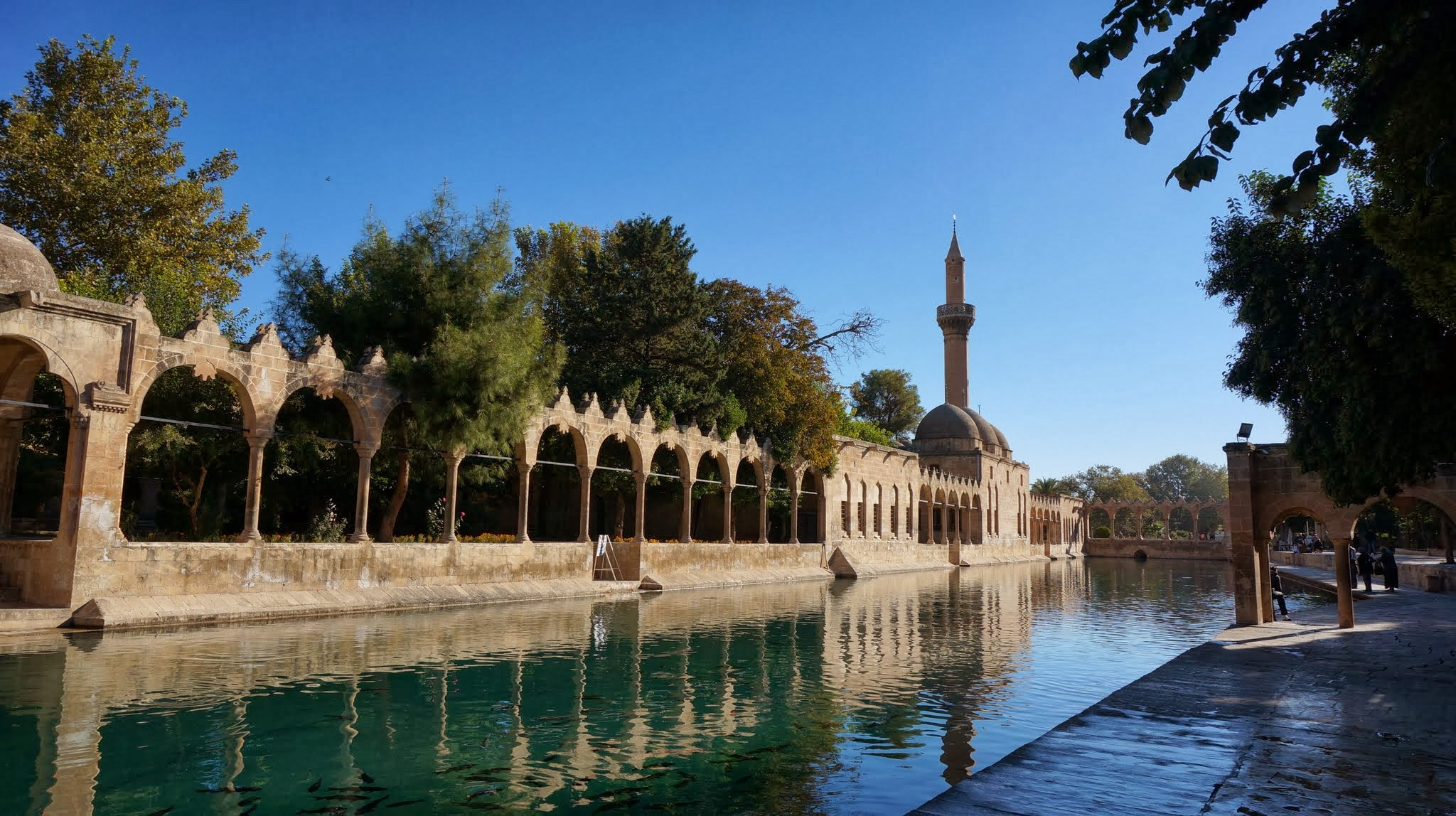
The Rızvaniye Mosque at Balıklıgöl, built in the early 1700s

Information about Urfa during the 1700s is relatively scarce, but one source is the fiscal records of the new Rızvaniye Mosque. These document the waqf properties assigned to the mosque, including shops, gardens, mills, and public baths, as well as information about tenants and rents. There was a mulberry orchard in front of the medrese at this point, as well as a prosperous marketplace with little empty space available for rent.

Based on various fiscal and tax documents, it seems that Urfa suffered a series of troubles in the 1750s and began to sink into poverty. One of the most serious problems was rampant banditry, which both impeded agricultural production in surrounding rural areas and hindered economic recovery.

A serious outbreak of plague hit Urfa in the 1780s, and many people died. Iraqi Turkmen, particularly from the regions around Mosul and Kirkuk, were deported and resettled in Urfa to help repopulate the city. The connection with Kirkuk in particular left cultural and linguistic traces in Urfa, and some present-day Urfalis have described the two cities as having an "uncle-nephew relationship".

=== 19th century ===
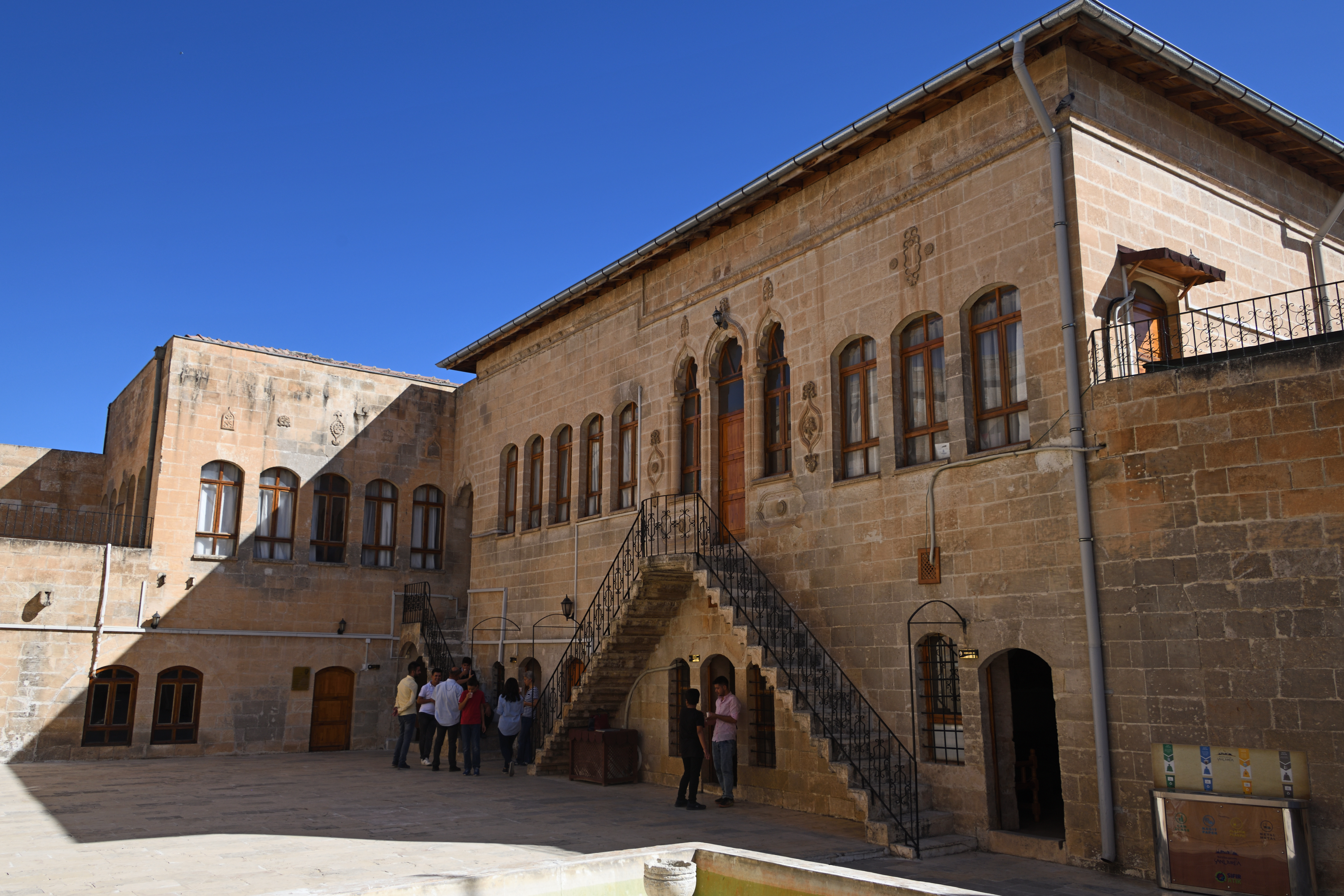
Urfa Reji Church, the structure was built on the remains of a church from the 6th century in 1861.

In the Ottoman period, Urfa was a center of commerce because of its location at a crossroads with Diyarbakır, Antep, Mardin, and Raqqa. Many Jewish, Armenian, and Greek merchants were present in Urfa, especially from Aleppo.

James Silk Buckingham visited Urfa in 1816 and ended up stuck there for a while because the roads were closed due to the ongoing Ottoman-Wahhabi War. Buckingham's account of early-1800s Urfa is one of the most informative of the late Ottoman period. By this time, the name "Urfa" had come to predominate, with only the city's Arab Christians still calling it "al-Ruha". The standard of living in Urfa had evidently increased since the 1600s – the mud brick houses recorded by Evliya Çelebi had given way to finer masonry structures that Buckingham compared to the houses of Aleppo. The houses described by Buckingham had harem and selamlik quarters separated by a courtyard, with the selamliks boasting "opulently furnished reception rooms" on their upper floors. Buckingham described the city as being divided into janissary and sharif factions, also like Aleppo. Many of the city's bazaars were closed due to the war, but Buckingham noted that Urfa had a thriving cotton trade during peacetime and observed some of the city's cotton printers at work. Coarser wool cloth and rugs were also manufactured in Urfa.

In the mid-1800s, Urfa benefitted from a general increase in commercial activity in the region. Most of the larger courtyard houses in the present-day old town probably date from this period. The large Armenian church on the western main street was built in 1842 and many mosques were probably also built around this time. According to Suraiya Faroqhi, though, the city's population "must have been at a low ebb for several decades in the mid-century".

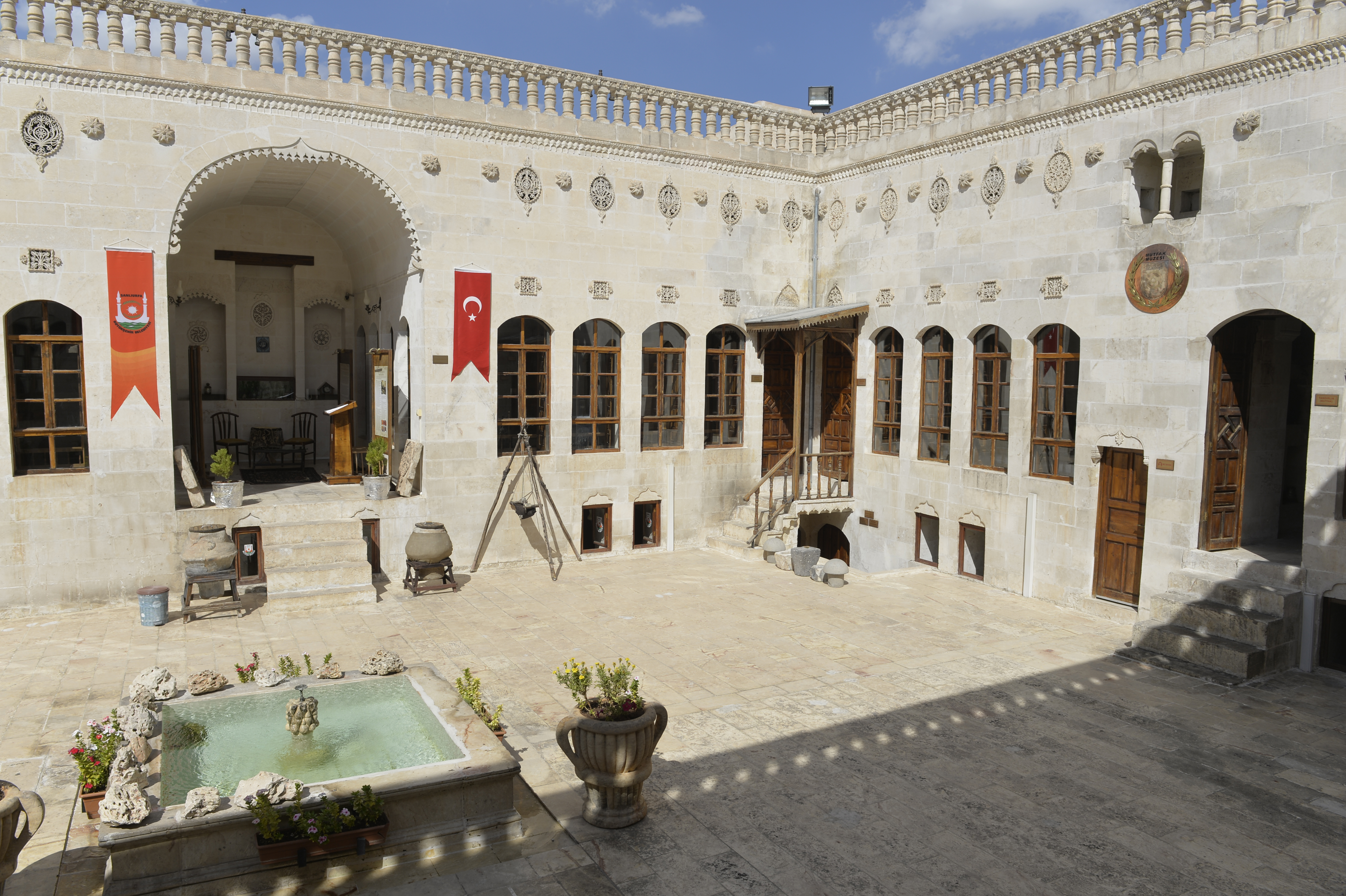
Urfa Kitchen Museum Building

However, in the late 1800s, Urfa declined in importance as a commercial center. In particular, the opening of the Suez Canal in 1869 caused a major realignment of trade routes, shifting away from overland caravans and towards maritime commerce. As a result, the volume of commercial traffic coming through Urfa decreased markedly compared to previous periods and became increasingly local/regional in nature. The local economy shifted away from producing goods for export and toward meeting the basic needs of the local population. Workshops produced less in general during this period and their focus was more on cheap basic goods like local fabrics and household goods. Imports also declined because the locals were focusing more on consuming cheap basic goods rather than luxuries; they were living simpler, more frugal lives. Because people were using more local products, the cost of living also decreased and people had to work less to meet their expenses. Contemporary court records document that there was extensive commercial contact between Muslims and non-Muslims; they bought and sold goods freely between each other and entered into commercial partnerships together, indicating that there was relatively high trust between both groups.

The main centers of commercial activity in the Ottoman period were the bazaars, where both local and imported goods were bought and sold. Generally, a bazaar would be named after its primary function and main goods sold there. For example, the İsotçular Çarşısı was named because of the homemade chili peppers sold in this street. Among the bazaars mentioned in late 19th-century records: Kadıoğlu, Köroğlu, Eski Arasa, Teymurcu, Sarayönü, Belediye, Beykapı, Akar, Sipâhî, Bedestan, Hânönü, Kafavhâne, and Hüseyniye.

There was a huge increase in the number of hans recorded in the Aleppo Salnames in the late 1800s: from just 7 in 1867 to 11 in 1888, 18 in 1889, and 32 in 1898. According to Yasin Taş, this is because not only were new hans being built, but records were simply counting more types of commercial buildings as hans. Muslim and non-Muslim travelers would both use the same hans regardless of religion.

In the countryside surrounding Urfa, life went on largely unchanged. Most rural villagers were involved in agriculture, and farmlands were typically plowed using the same low-tech methods that had been used for thousands of years. Cows and oxen were kept as draft animals. Irrigated farmland around the Euphrates and some streams was more expensive than the waterless fields called "deştî land" which was not able to be irrigated. Irrigation channels were repaired jointly among the people who used the water. Sometimes there would be people living in the city (often non-Muslim) who would own farmland outside the city and deputize local villagers (often Muslim) to run the farm under the muzâraa contract. In 1846, taxes could not be collected because of drought and locusts. In 1861, 1863, and 1886, there were locusts; in 1870 there was a drought due to lack of rain.

Up until the mid-1890s, about 20,000 of the city's 60,000 residents were Armenians. In 1895, however, thousands of Armenians were killed in a series of massacres by both civilians and soldiers. First, in October, Turkish and Kurdish locals killed hundreds of Armenians over a two-day period. Then for two months the Armenian quarter was effectively subjected to a siege, with no food or water allowed in. The Turks claimed that the Armenians had a weapon cache, which they demanded in return for lifting the siege. In December, the siege ended when "a crowd of Turkish soldiers and civilians" entered the Armenian quarter and killed thousands of its inhabitants. About 3,000 survivors sought shelter in a nearby church – which is normally recognized as a place of refuge under Islamic law. However, soldiers burned the church to the ground, killing everyone inside. The troops went on to loot and burn the rest of the Armenian quarter. According to Lord Kinross, some 8,000 Armenians were killed in total.

There was a small but ancient Jewish community in Urfa, with a population of about 1,000 by the 19th century. Most of the Jews emigrated in 1896, fleeing the Hamidian massacres, and settling mainly in Aleppo, Tiberias and Jerusalem. There were three Christian communities: Syriac, Armenian, and Latin. The last Neo-Aramaic Christians left in 1924 and went to Aleppo (where they settled in a place that was later called Hay al-Suryan "The Syriac Quarter").

== First World War and aftermath ==
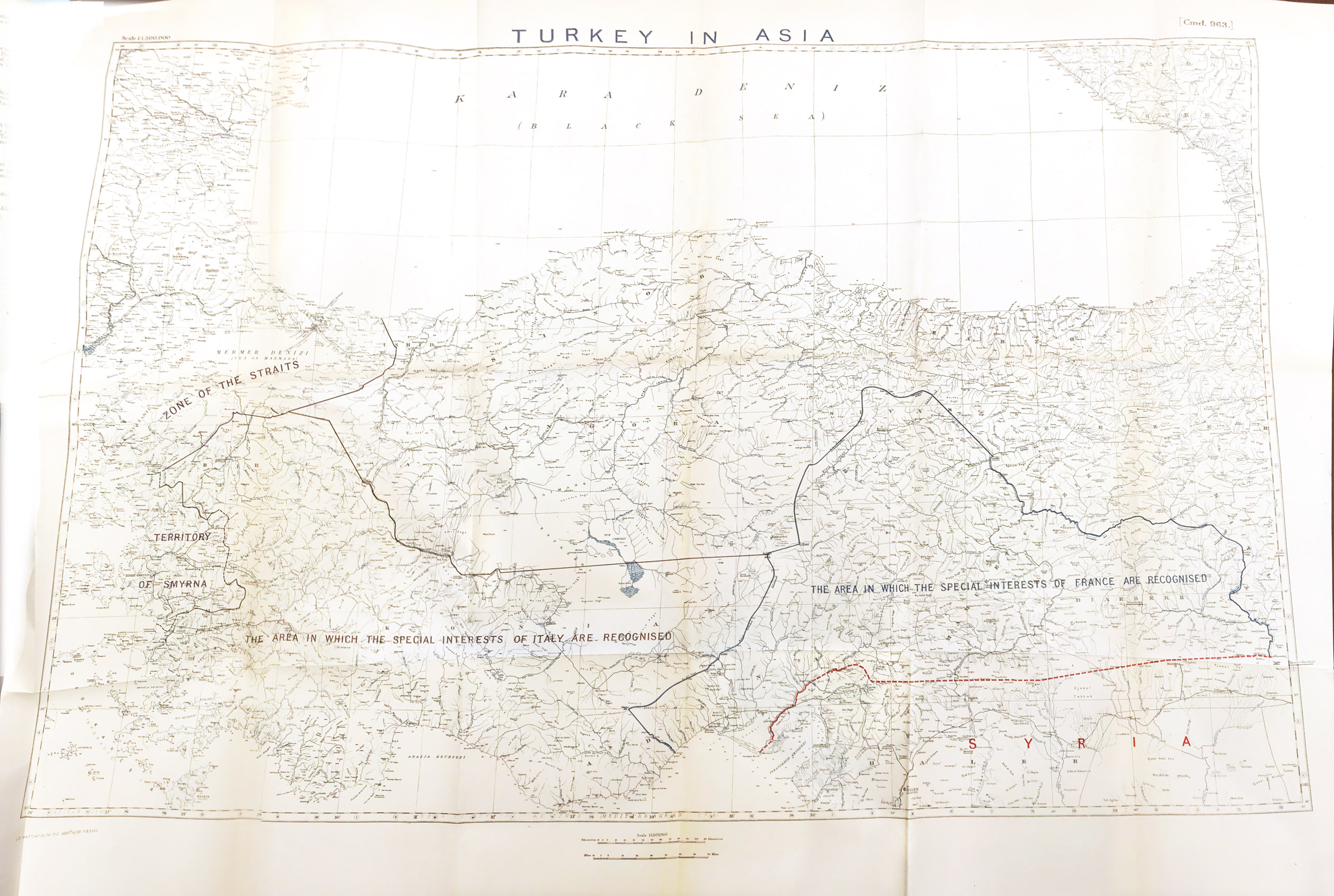
Map showing the borders set by the Treaty of Sevres, which assigned Urfa to the French-controlled Mandate of Syria. Urfa is shown here just below the dotted red line, and directly above the "Y" in "Syria".

During the First World War, Urfa was a site of the Armenian and Assyrian genocides, beginning in 1915. Members of Urfa's Armenian community were deported and killed. In May, 18 families were deported from Urfa, and in June, 50 people were arrested, tortured, and then deported to Diyarbakır, where they were killed on the road. Urfa was also a stop on the deportation route, and the Urfa resistance in October was composed of Armenians deported from Van and Diyarbakır. Survivors from killings elsewhere had begun to arrive in Urfa, and by mid-August, massacres had begun in Urfa itself. Some 400 Armenians were taken to the edge of town and killed during a four-day period from 15 to 19 August. (Note: Armenian-Genocide.org presents a somewhat different timeline: according to them, the first killings happened on 19 August, when about 250 Armenians were killed, and the second round happened four days later on 23 August.) Another massacre took place on 23 September, when 300 Armenians were killed.

In response to the Urfa resistance in October, Mehmet Celal Bey, who had served as governor of Aleppo before being sacked for refusing to comply with the order to deport the local Armenians, commented: "Each human has the right to live. A trampled worm will squirm and wriggle. The Armenians will defend themselves." The final event of the resistance was on 15 October, when several thousand Turkish troops attacked their position. The next day, some 20,000 Armenian deportees in transit were killed in and around Urfa.

Meanwhile, during the Russian occupation of Western Armenia, many Turks fleeing those regions came and settled in Urfa. Mehmet Adil Saraç estimates that around 8 to 10 thousand Turks migrated to the Urfa region this way.

At the end of the First World War, the Treaty of Sèvres assigned Urfa to the French-controlled Mandate of Syria, 5 km south of the border with Turkey. As a result, Urfa was occupied by British and then French troops. Locals from Urfa formed a militia and successfully drove out the occupying troops on 11 April 1920. The 1923 Treaty of Lausanne officially settled the matter by including Urfa as part of the new Republic of Turkey.

Under the new republic, Urfa was made capital of the new Urfa Province on 20 April 1924.

Urfa Halkevi was established on 23 February 1934, on a site that had earlier been occupied by a vocational school called the Mekteb-i Sanayi. The halkevi opened with only 7 branches: Language and Literature, Fine Arts, Representation, Sport, Social Assistance, Library and Publication, and Villagers. An eighth branch, People's Classrooms and Courses, was added in 1935. Throughout its existence, the Urfa Halkevi faced financial difficulties. It was eventually closed down when the halkevi program was abolished in 1951.

During this period, there were 7 newspapers in Urfa: the Urfa'da Milli Gazete ("National Gazette in Urfa"), Yeni Işık ("New Light"), Yenilik ("Newness"), Işık ("Light"), Urfa, Akgün ("White Day"), and İrfan ("Knowledge").

== 21st century ==
During the Syrian Civil War, thousands of Syrian refugees fled to Turkey, and many of them settled in Urfa. When Raqqa became the capital of the Islamic State, Urfa became a gateway for jihadists entering Syria because of its closeness to the Akçakale-Tall Abyad border crossing and to Raqqa itself. The city's general religious-conservative climate meant that many locals who adhere to Salafi thought sympathized with the Islamic State, and many of its members lived in the city as well.

On 6 February 2023, Urfa suffered some damage from the twin Turkey-Syria earthquakes.
