= Hagia Sophia, Edessa =

Former church in Edessa

The Basilica of Hagia Sophia of Edessa (Greek: Ἁγία Σοφία, meaning "Holy Wisdom") was an ancient Early Christian church and later a Byzantine basilica, located in modern-day Edessa, Turkey. It was constructed in the early 3rd century, destroyed in a flood in 525, and restored as a Byzantine basilica by Justinian I. It was supposedly the first site of the appearance of the Mandylion.

It was a "twin" basilica of the Hagia Sophia of Constantinople, with a relatively similar floor plan. Although its construction began seven years before the Hagia Sophia of Constantinople, in 525, it was completed eight years after the latter, in 545, mainly due to significant delays. During the Early Middle Ages, it was considered one of the wonders of the world by some Christian and Muslim travelers. It had a single dome rising from a square base and distinguished itself from the capital's basilica by being surrounded by water and having an interior predominantly decorated with white marble.

The basilica persisted at least until the early 12th century, when a substantial part of the structure collapsed during a siege of the city. While there are hardly any archaeological traces remaining, textual sources, including a fairly detailed Syriac hymn, can be used to reconstruct the architecture of the building.

== History ==
Hagia Sophia was dedicated to the "Holy Wisdom" (Ἁγία Σοφία / Hagía Sophía), identified with Jesus Christ and not to a human saint.

=== Early Church ===
The church was built in the early 3rd century in Edessa, making it the oldest church in the city. Despite numerous floods and earthquakes over the following centuries, it was consistently restored. In 394, it received relics attributed to Thomas the Apostle.

=== Basilica ===
Finally, after a significant flood in 525 that destroyed a substantial part of the city, Emperor Justinian I decided to rebuild it. In doing so, he completely modified the structure, transforming the provincial cathedral into a Byzantine basilica. The basilica is said to have been built by the Chalcedonian bishop Amidonius of Edessa, also called Amazonius in some sources, along with two others, Asuph and Addai. However, it appears that the construction faced delays and multiple bishops succeeded each other without real progress. Justinian I intervened in the early 540s to expedite and complete the work, likely motivated by the desire to have the basilica consecrated close to the consecration of the new Chalcedonian bishop, Asklepios. The goal was likely to strengthen the Chalcedonian faction within Syriac Christianity.

For many years, the basilica housed the Mandylion, a relic alleged to be the face of Jesus imprinted on a cloth. This relic was placed on the cathedra, and the cathedral gained significance within Christendom, partly due to this relic. During wars, a liturgical ceremony took place in the cathedral, during which the relic was taken outside the church and presented to the Byzantine army. It was then used in battles as the imperial standard.

The basilica had a complicated history; it was disputed between the Monophysites, who were trying to take control of it, and the Chalcedonians, who were trying to retain it. After being under Monophysite control for a few decades, it was restored to the Chalcedonians by Emperor Heraclius. This was later confirmed by the early Arab caliphates, who decided to leave the place of worship in the hands of the Chalcedonians. Services were held there bilingually, with two choirs, a Syriac choir, and a Greek choir. Additionally, it is challenging to assess the proportion of Syriac clerics within the cathedral compared to Greek clerics because Chalcedonian Syriac priests tended to bear Greek names, even if they were not Greek.

The cathedral survived at least until the 12th century, when the western part of the building collapsed alongside most of it during the siege of the city by the Turks.

== Architecture ==
Its architecture is primarily known through a Syriac hymn in twenty-two strophes that describes the proportions and plans of the building quite precisely. It is relatively similar to its contemporary "twin", the Hagia Sophia in Constantinople, although it differs in some aspects, such as its decorations, which are predominantly made of marble. It is sometimes considered the "rival" of the capital's basilica.

Situated in a space surrounded by water, the builders' intent appears to have been to create a church representing the universe. Thus, the waters surrounding the structure were seen as celestial waters, and the vault was covered in blue and studded with stars. These ideas are present in Christianity in the Book of Genesis, and are linked to the theology of Pseudo-Dionysius the Areopagite, particularly significant in Eastern Christianity in the 6th century.

The French researcher Françoise Briquel-Chatonnet described the architecture of the building as follows:

On the outside, it had three identical sides, indicating a square plan. The only side with a different appearance was naturally that of the apse. It was covered by a single dome on pendentives supported by four arches. This dome was made of stones, externally covered with lead, while the interior ceiling was adorned with mosaics. The sogitā described a covering of white marble on the walls, making it particularly radiant.

== Legacy ==
During the Middle Ages, the basilica was admired as one of the wonders of the world by Christian and Muslim travelers.

== See also ==
- History of Urfa
