= Urfa Reji Church =

Syriac Orthodox church in Sanlıurfa, Turkey

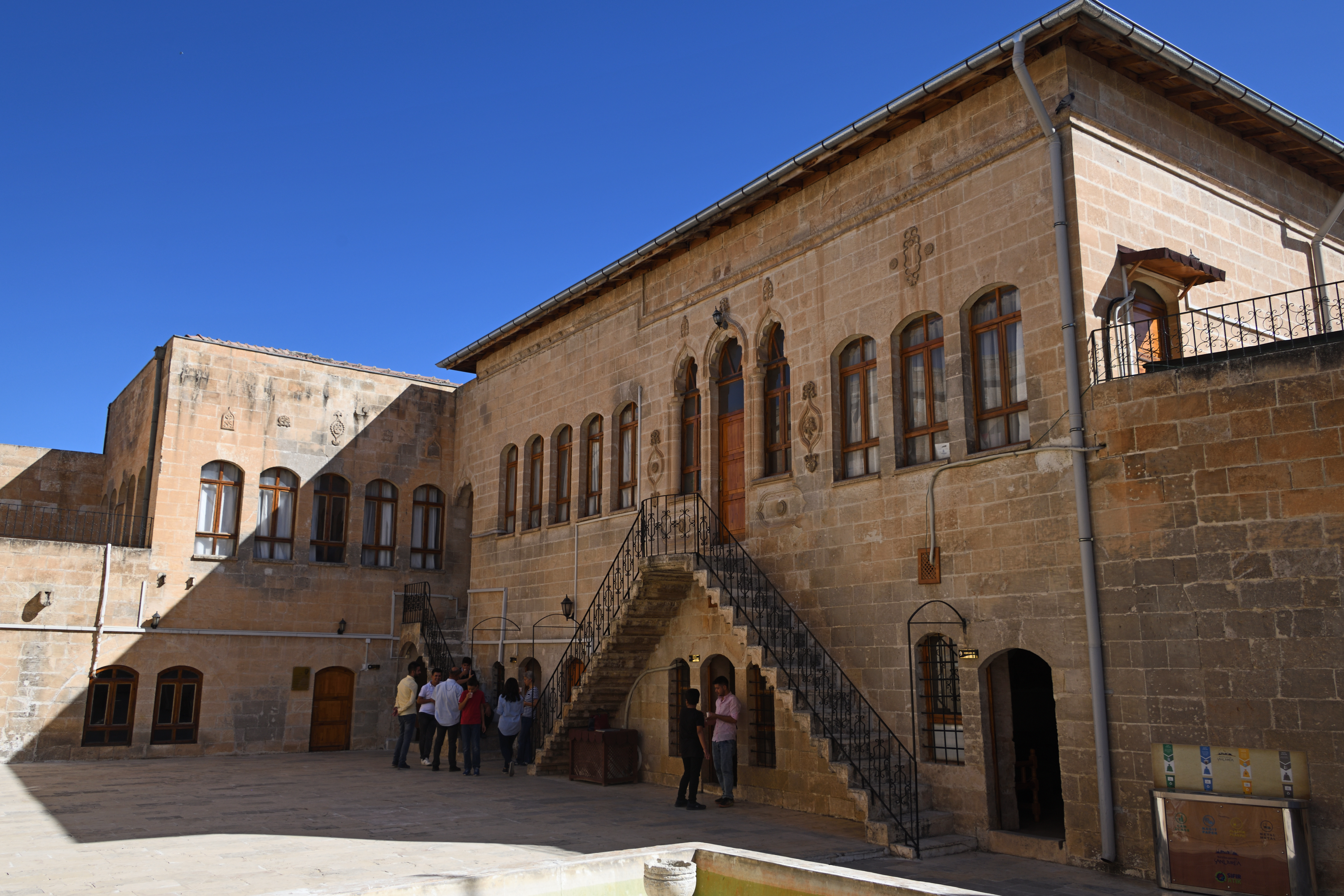
Urfa Reji Church, the structure was built on the remains of a church from the 6th century in 1861.

The Urfa Reji Church or Church of the Apostles of Peter and Paul is a former Syriac Orthodox church in Sanlıurfa, Turkey of the Syriac rite.

Built in 1861 on the remains of a sixth-century church. It was built in memory of the Apostles of Peter and Paul and bears their name, the building served as a place of worship for the Syriac community until 1924.

After the Syriac community had to leave the area, the church was used as a tobacco factory and then as a grape warehouse by the Tekel. It is now the Vali Kemalettin Gazezoglu Cultural Center and is used for various social events.
