= Urfa Halkevi =

Community center of Turkey's CHP

The Urfa Halkevi was a halkevi ("people's house", or community center) that existed in the Turkish city of Urfa from 1934 to 1951. It organized a variety of activities in 8 branches (originally 7) and promoted the ideology of the ruling Republican People's Party, or CHP.

== History ==
Urfa's halkevi was established on 23 February 1934. Its building was built on the site that had earlier been occupied by a vocational school called the Mekteb-i Sanayi. The halkevi's first president was Musa Kazım Yazgan. Unusually, the Urfa Halkevi was established without a CHP party organization — the local CHP organization was only established in 1944 — and as a result had both financial and communication difficulties from the beginning. The halkevi opened with only 7 branches: Language and Literature, Fine Arts, Representation, Sport, Social Assistance, Library and Publication, and Villagers. Two of the standard halkevi branches — the Museum and Exhibition branch and the People's Classroom and Courses branch — were absent. According to the Urfa Halkevi's first yearbook in February 1935, there had been 32 conferences, 65 concerts, 22 plays, 32 meetings, and 50 sports days in the halkevi's first year, and it had a membership of 879 (843 men and 36 women).

An early problem experienced by the halkevi was that its well did not supply enough water, especially during the summer. At one point it dried up, preventing cleaning work from taking place and causing the garden's flowers to dry out. Around 1935, the halkevi went through a period of stagnation. A local journalist wrote that, during the day, the place was empty except for a handful of students playing billiards; he criticized the halkevi's inactivity, comparing it to a "deserted neighborhood". In 1936, Urfa governor Atıf Ulusoğlu intervened to address the lack of activity at the halkevi. Also in 1936, First Inspector-General Abidin Özmen made various inspections in Urfa and left a report saying that, while the halkevi building was functional, it was small and should be expanded next year.

Another thing done at the halkevi was to make it a place where people could hear important announcements on the radio. For example, on 4 April 1939, thousands of people gathered in front of the Urfa halkevi, where loudspeakers were set up to broadcast the news of the 6th Parliament of Turkey's first convening and its renewal of İsmet İnönü as president for a second term.

=== Closure ===
With the beginning of the multi-party era in Turkish politics in 1950, when the Democrat Party came to power nationwide, the entire halkevi program became a source of criticism as an organ of the CHP. For example, the halkevis were officially affiliated with the CHP and their presidents were CHP members. A local newspaper in Urfa criticized the ways that the halkevis were run — for example, they received thousands of liras in government funds, which the CHP party organization spent on itself rather than the halkevis, and they were used as meeting places for CHP members. For a while after the 1950 elections, which returned 6 Democrat MP's for Urfa province and 1 CHP MP, there was a debate over what to do with halkevis in general. In Urfa, the halkevi building as well as the CHP headquarters were included in a "Green Field Area" (Turkish: Yeşil Saha Alanı) project with the land registered in the CHP's name. Urfa governor İsmail Hakkı Baykal and lawyer Ömer Alagöz ended up filing a joint lawsuit to nullify the CHP's deed to the land.

In August 1951, the Turkish National Assembly officially voted to close the halkevis. All movable properties of the halkevis were transferred to the treasury.

== Branches ==
=== Language, History, and Literature ===
The Language, History, and Literature branch (Dil, Tarih ve Edebiyat Şubesi) was concerned with holding conferences disseminating Turkish language and culture, particularly among the city's many Arabs and Kurds. In addition to language studies, this branch also undertook historical research on monuments and artifacts from Urfa, as well as from other towns in the province like Siverek and Viranşehir. It was also tasked with collecting cultural traditions like folklore, proverbs, music, and dance, and it also published a magazine.

According to the halkevi's records as of February 1935, this branch's membership was 180 people: 4 women and 176 men.

=== Fine Arts ===
The Fine Arts branch (Güzel Sanatlar Şubesi) dealt with training people in art forms like music, sculpture, painting, and architecture. It gave contemporary western music performances (classical and jazz); within a year of its establishment, it had gathered enough musicians to give musical performances three nights a week. The musicians also did concert tours to other provincial towns like Hilvan, Siverek, and Viranşehir. It also did painting exhibitions displaying artwork.

According to the halkevi's records as of February 1935, the Fine Arts branch had 163 members, 11 women and 152 men.

=== Representation ===
The Representation branch (Temsil Şubesi) involved performance of plays. In part because of the visual element, these plays were always among the most popular attractions at the Halkevi and drew large crowds. Many of the parts were performed by teachers. From the beginning, one of the biggest challenges facing this branch was a lack of female actors, and in December 1935 the report by Urfa's MPs to the CHP General Secretariat requested female teachers to be sent to Urfa from İzmir and Çapa. Because of the shortage of female actors, many of the plays put on had the only female cast members being halkevi teachers, or they were staged without any women in the cast. Due to the extreme heat in Urfa, especially during the summer, performances were often given outdoors in the garden. Members of the Representation branch also performed in other towns, such as the play Alp Arslan, which they performed in Urfa five times in 1947 and then also did performances in Suruç and Birecik.

The Representation branch also took part in national holiday events, such as the Victory Day celebrations, where for example they performed a play called Akıl Taciri in 1945. On the 15th and 17th anniversaries of the liberation of Urfa on 11 April 1920, there were festivities in Urfa which included performances by the Representation branch dramatizing the events of 1920.

According to the halkevi's records as of February 1935, there were 91 members registered to this branch, 6 women and 85 men.

=== Sport ===
The Sport branch (Spor Şubesi) had the tightest budget of all the branches and was the most often in financial difficulty. Its goal was to increase interest in various sports and it had four branches: Football, Swimming, Equestrianism, and Athletics (which included boxing and wrestling). Swimming was done at the pool in Cumhuriyet Parkı. The halkevi's football team organized trips to Gaziantep, Mardin, and Diyarbakır — only nearby cities; they could not afford to travel farther — and played matches there. Equestrianism was the most active branch. Within the halkevi's first year, it hosted three conferences on sport. In March 1943, a billiards setup, which had been in storage for a long time, was taken out of the warehouse and repaired and installed in the halkevi's main hall.

According to the halkevi's records as of February 1935, there were 135 members registered to this branch, all of them male.

=== Social Assistance ===
The Social Assistance branch (Sosyal Yardım Şubesi) focused on activities giving aid to people in need, such as the poor, young, old, disabled, and sick. This branch also held conferences given by doctors and pharmacists on public health topics. Several such conferences were held in December 1934, including for example ones on "gynecology" and one on "typhoid fever and water". This branch also contributed to the building of the two-story, ten-classroom Viranşehir Regional School (Viranşehir Bölge Okulu) in 1936. After the 1938 Kırşehir earthquake, a large meeting was held at the Urfa halkevi under Urfa governor Kazım Demirer to collect aid for the people of Kırşehir. In 1943, the Social Assistance branch teamed up with the Child Protection Agency to provide food to poor children in primary and secondary schools.

According to the halkevi's records as of February 1935, the Social Assistance branch had 120 members, 10 women and 110 men.

=== Library and Publication ===
The Library and Publication branch (Kitapsaray [or Kütüphane] ve Yayın Şubesi) was earmarked by the CHP as especially important. A library and reading room was established under this branch, with 2,180 books in its first year. The reading hall was open every day except Tuesday until 22:00 in the evening. A second library was established in 1935, this one with some 2,500 books. The Library and Publication branch kept a library and reading hall, and also set up mobile libraries to try and reach more people. They published books, such as one about Urfa's defense during the Turkish War of Independence, and also worked on a monthly magazine. Members of this branch worked closely with the city's newspapers (some of them actually worked for the newspapers), which gave coverage to the halkevi's activities. The branch also dealt with radio, which was especially useful as a means of encouraging use of the Turkish language in the linguistically diverse southeast. However, a local government document from June 1940 requesting a radio with an accumulator for the halkevi (there were problems with electricity due to a lack of diesel fuel) indicates that there were challenges in implementing this policy.

According to the halkevi's records as of February 1935, the Library and Publication branch had 50 members: 2 female and 48 male.

=== Villagers ===
The Villagers branch (Köycülük Şubesi) was responsible for overseeing village development and bringing the halkevi activities to the villagers. Its activities included organizing village festivities, distributing fruit and vegetable seeds, and helping provide medicine to villagers. However, due to financial difficulties, this branch couldn't afford to go out to the villages much, and it was the least active branch of the Urfa Halkevi.

According to the halkevi's records as of February 1935, the Library and Publication branch had 142 members, all male.

=== People's Classrooms and Courses ===
The People's Classrooms and Courses branch (Halk Dershaneleri ve Kurslar Şubesi), which was intended to provide general non-formal education and training opportunities for people, was not initially one of the branches at the Urfa Halkevi. However, in 1935, the halkevi began to offer this branch despite ongoing budget problems; the classes offered ended up turning a profit. For example, there were two Turkish classes and two French classes (the French class was initiated in April 1947), as well as an English class, with women taught during the day and men at night, a German class, and also mathematics. In 1938, the village muhtars of Arapkir district also attended a special muhtarship class held at the Urfa Halkevi.

According to the halkevi's records as of February 1935, there were 61 members registered to this branch, all men. The total number of people who attended classes, however, was 2,509.

== Challenges faced ==
Among the challenges faced by the Urfa Halkevi were low participation by women and lack of funds. In general, while the halkevi aimed to raise the status of women, traditional patriarchal social structures were strongly entrenched in eastern Turkey and difficult to overcome. The branches that struggled the most financially were Sport, Villagers, and Social Assistance.
