= Sendika.org =

Sendika.org is an alternative news website known for providing viewpoints now widely censored in Turkey under the Erdogan government. According to Reporters Without Borders, whose Collateral Freedom project offered to mirror the site,

It aims to serve as a mouthpiece for those without a voice and to cover stories ignored by mainstream media – including social issues, the Kurdish issue, and the women’s and LGBT movements. Recognized as a leading source of news about the crackdown on the Occupy Gezi movement in 2013, it has also provided cutting-edge reporting on many other sensitive stories such air strikes against civilian targets in Roboski, the Soma coalmine explosion, rioting linked to the siege of Kobane, President Erdogan’s Syria policy and clashes in the southeast.

Known for its coverage of Kurdish issues, Sendika was among the first few dozen sites blocked by the Turkish government after conflict resumed in July 2015 between the Turkish government and the PKK. It responded by registering a sequence of names, e.g. Sendika63.org as of December 2018, each of which has been blocked in succession. (The sendika.org address will redirect readers outside Turkey to the newest iteration) These are among more than 100,000 addresses blocked by April 2016. The pace of blocks on the site's iterations increased transiently following the 2017 Turkish constitutional referendum. After the 49th block, surpassing the Dicle News Agency, Sendika applied to the Guinness Book of World Records for status of most-blocked website.
