= San Michele Arcangelo, Perugia =

Religious building in central Italy

Coordinates: 43.120°N 12.3853°E

Temple of Saint Michel
- Tempio or Tempietto
- Tempio di San Michele Arcangelo
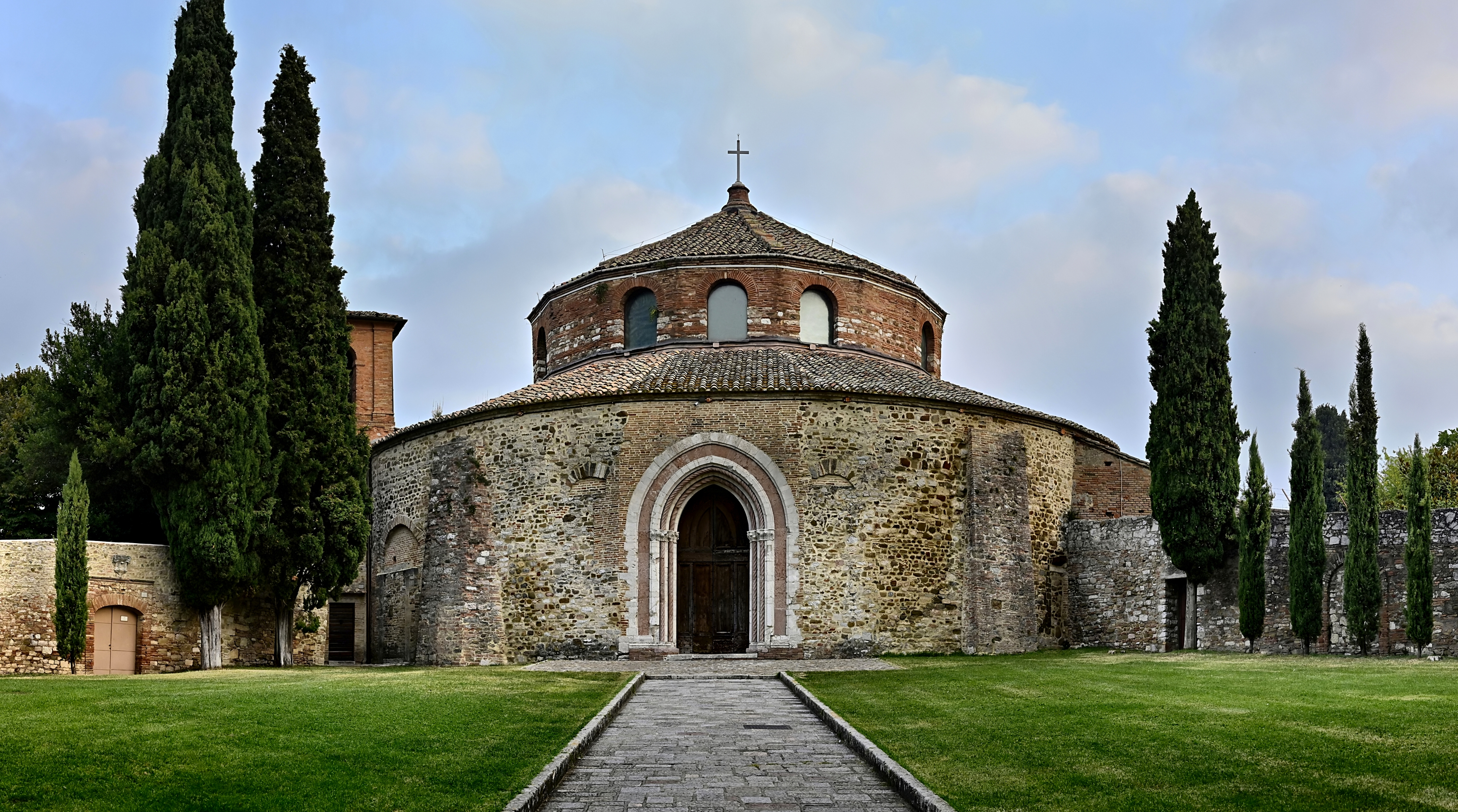
- Temple of Saint Michel
- Location: Perugia
- Country: Italy

Architecture
- Architectural type: Paleochristian, Romanesque
- Years built: to the 5th to 6th century

San Michele Arcangelo, also known as Sant'Angelo, is a paleo-Christian temple in the city of Perugia in Umbria. The circular building dates to the 5th to 6th century, and incorporates corinthian capped columns from a prior pagan temple. It is dedicated to the Archangel Michael, whose churches were often located in elevated spots. The small round church is also often called Tempio or Tempietto, and is located in the neighborhood Borgo Sant'Angelo, near the ancient northern gate (Porta Sant'Angelo) of the city.

The structure of the church has undergone various alterations over the centuries. In 1479, it was converted into a small fort. A major restoration in 1948 uncovered ancient frescoes and previously sealed windows. Architecturally, the building reflects early Romanesque style with Byzantine influences, particularly in the layout of the chapels. The circular plan, however, is a feature shared with other ancient churches in central Italy, such as Sant'Ercolano and San Giovanni Rotondo in Perugia. The design also recalls that of Santo Stefano Rotondo (c. 460–480) in Rome.

== Interior ==
The interior has a circumferential ambulatory delimited by sixteen columns with corinthian capitals. The interior has some notable early Christian symbolism, including a pentagram at the entrance and some crosses belonging to Knights Templar order.

== Gallery ==
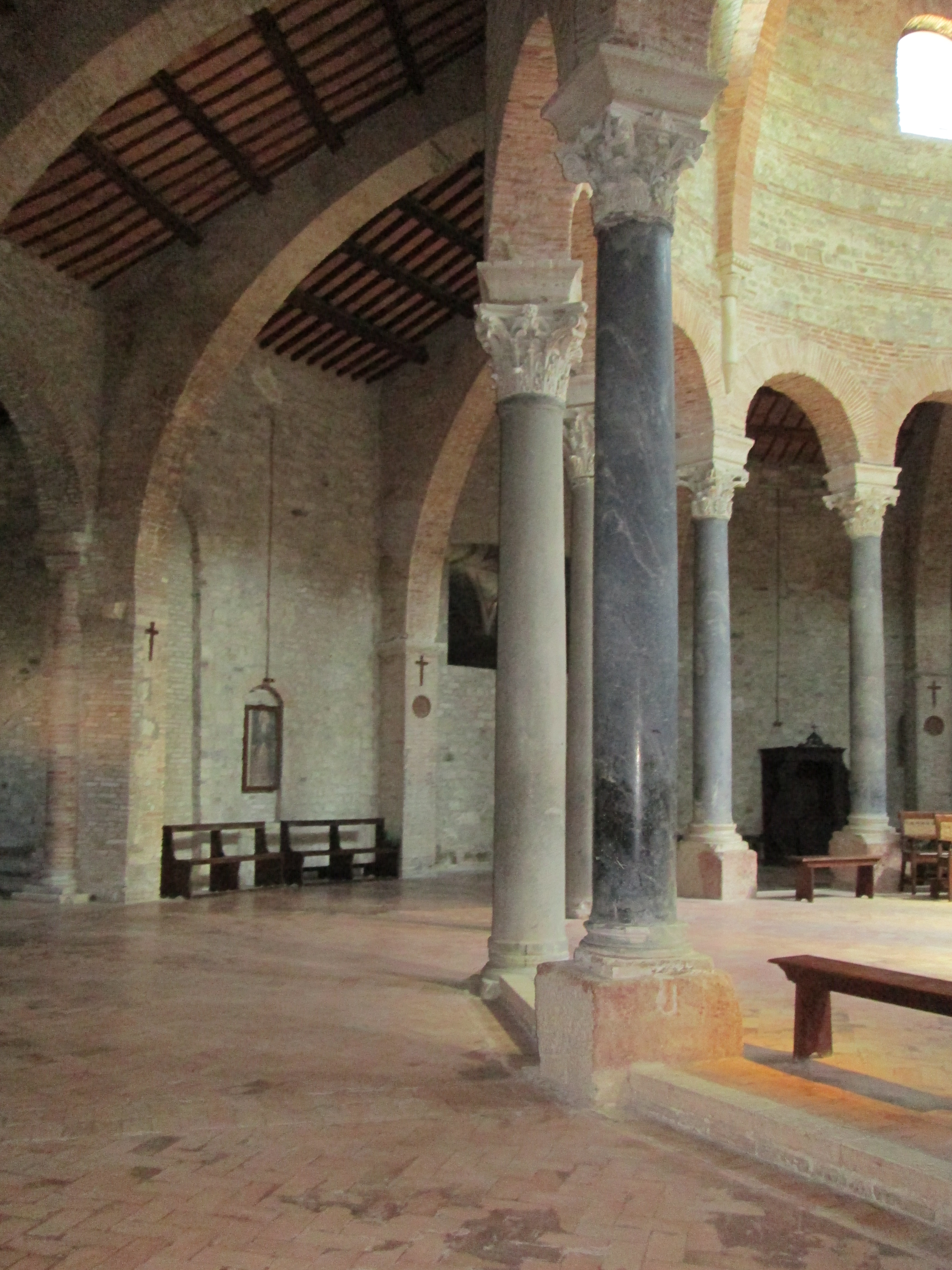
Interior of the temple

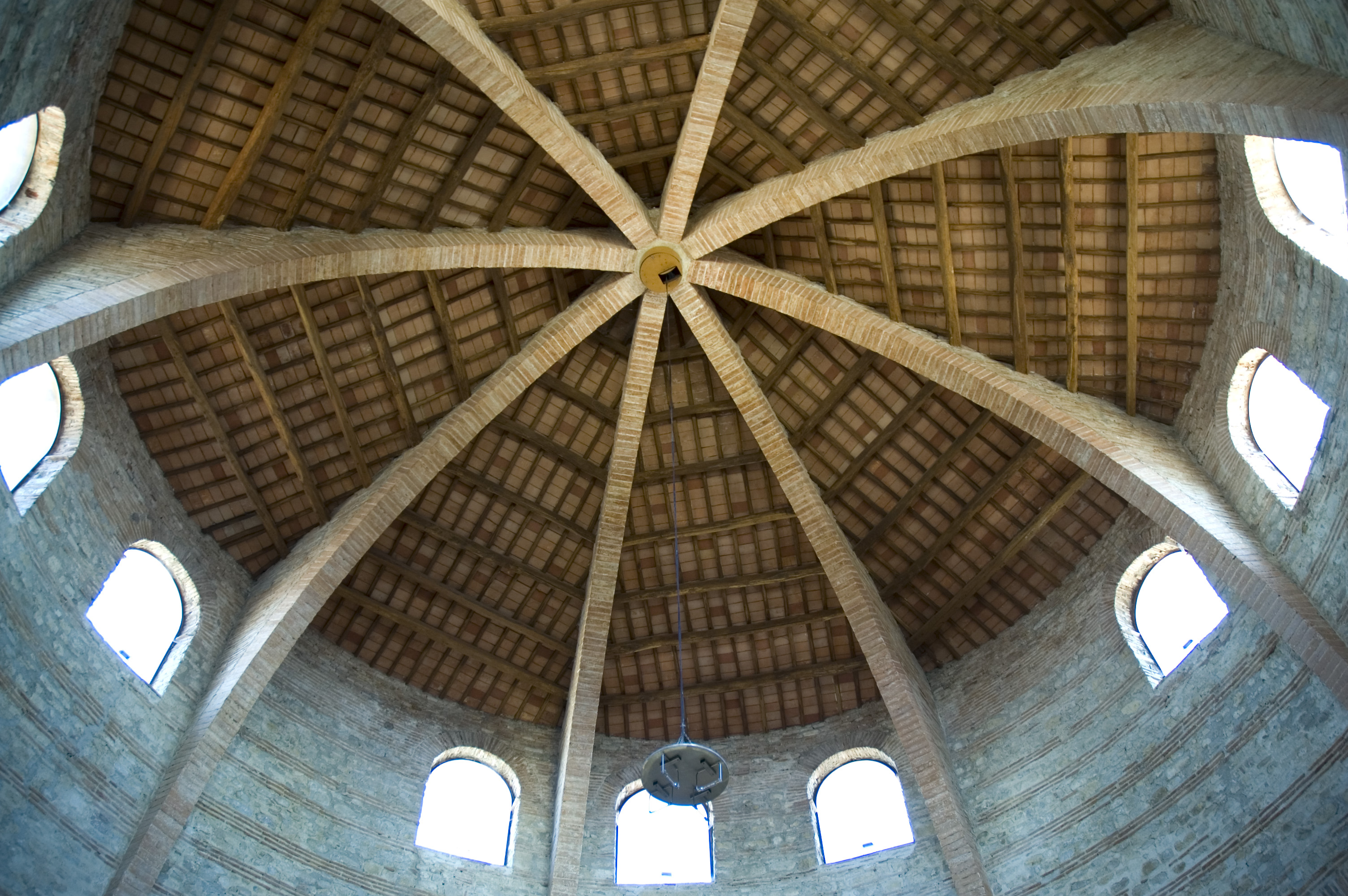
Cupola of the temple

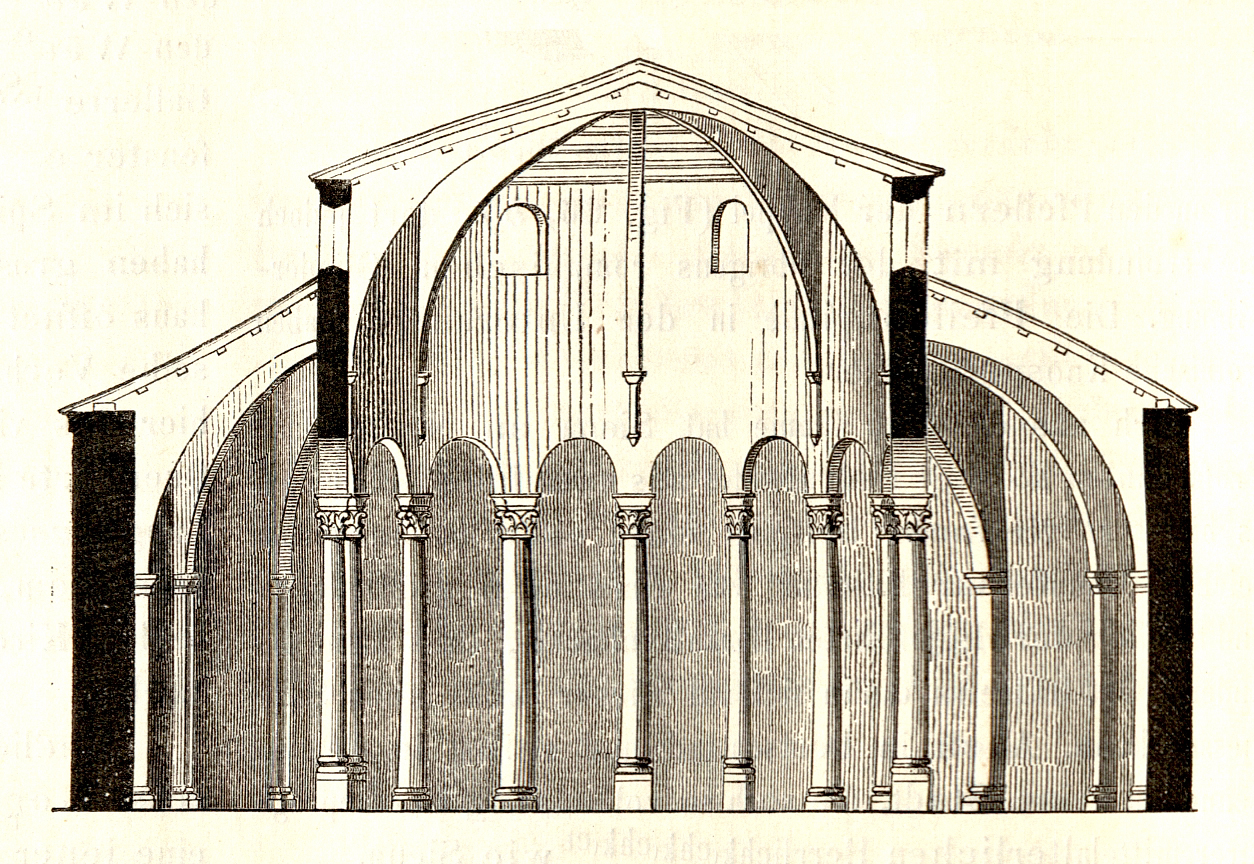
Architectural plan of the church (cross-section)
