= Yiwa (tribe) =

Oghuz tribe

- Tamgha of the Yiwa tribe

Regions with significant populations
- Azerbaijan, Turkey, Turkmenistan

Languages
- Oghuz Turkic

Religion
- Islam

Related ethnic groups
- Oghuz Turks

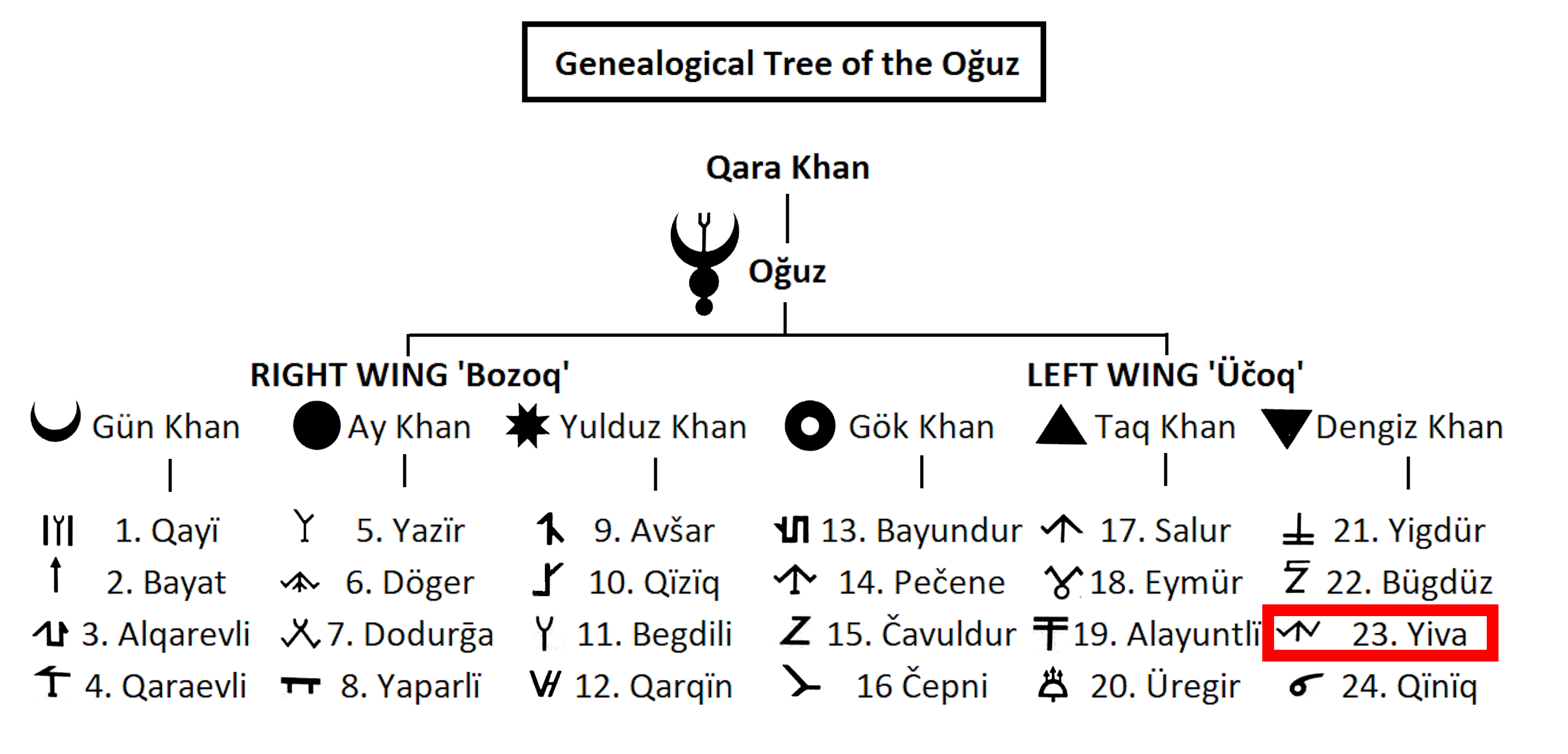
Yiwa in the Oghuz genealogical tree

Yiwa (Azerbaijani: Yıva, Turkish: Yıva, Turkmen: Ywa) was one of the 24 ancient Oghuz (Turkoman) tribes. The Yiwa tribe belonged to the tribe of Dengiz Khan, the youngest son of Oghuz Khagan.

Part of the Yiwa, led by Suleyman Shah, moved from Central Asia to Western Iran and the upper reaches of Tigris and Euphrates in the 13th century. The capital of Suleyman Shah became the city of Bahar (near Hamadan). Suleyman Shah led the defense of Baghdad against the Mongols of Hulagu and was defeated.

== History ==
By the 14th century, the Yiwa had established a foothold in eastern Anatolia, and took possession of the area comprising the Van Lake and the surroundings of Mosul.

=== Qara Qoyunlu ===
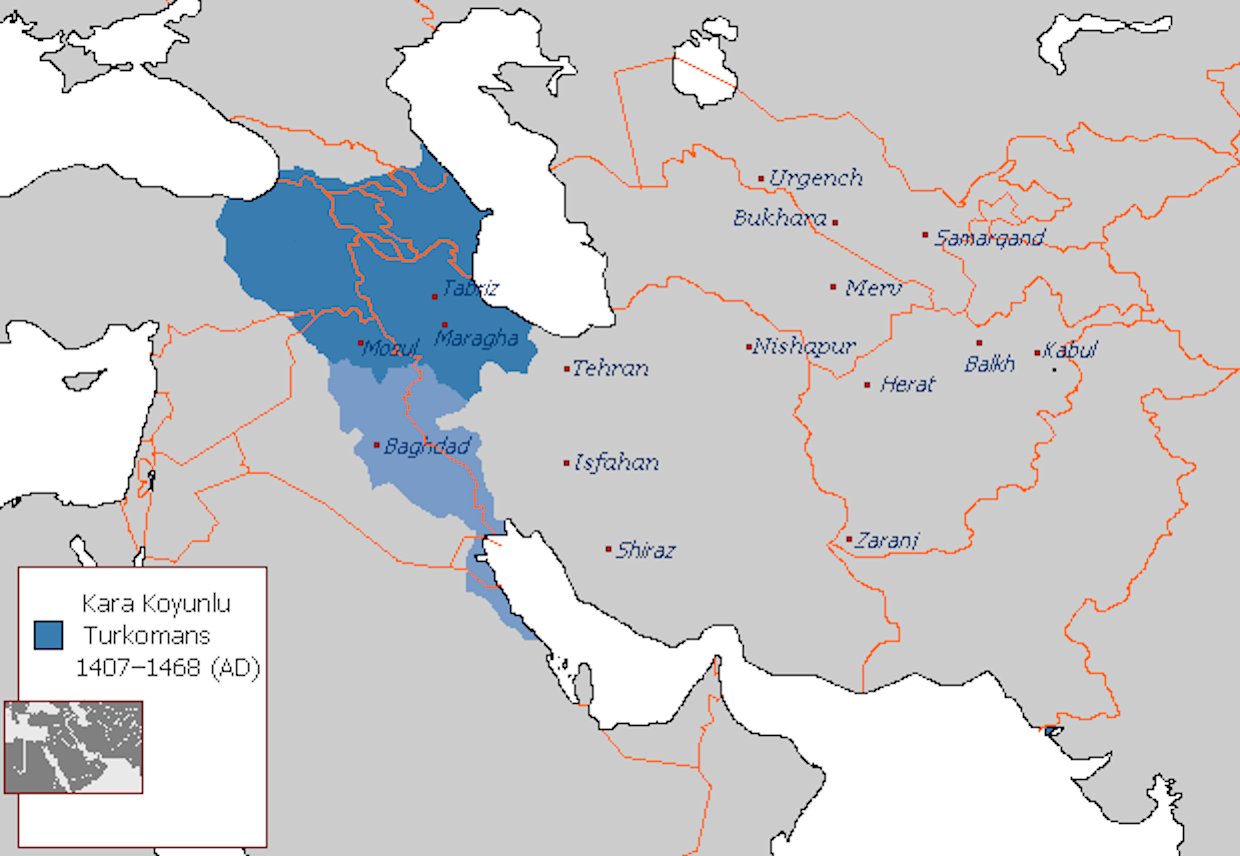
Qara Qoyunlu Turkomans, 1407–1468

The Qara Qoyunlu rulers descended from the Yiwa tribe, specifically the Baharlu tribe.

== Rulers of the Yiwa ==
House of Yiwa

Qara Qoyunlu
Golconda Sultanate
Nawab of Awadh

Mansur
Bayram-Khwaja r. 1374–1380	Tursun	Birdi-Khwaja r. 1380–1380
Muhammad r. 1380–1389
Khwaja-Misr r. 1389–1389	Yusuf I r. 1389–1403, 1405–1420
Pir-Budaq r. 1411–1418	Isfand r. 1420–1421	Iskandar r. 1421–1429, 1431–1438	Abu Sa'id r. 1429–1431	Jahan-Shah r. 1438–1467
Alwand	Hasan-Ali r. 1467–1468	Yusuf II r. 1468–1469
Pir-Quli
Uways-Quli
Sultan-Quli r. 1518–1543	House of Awadh
Jamshid-Quli r. 1543–1550	Ibrahim-Quli r. 1550–1580	Safdar Jang r. 1739–1754
Subhan-Quli r. 1550–1550	Muhammad-Quli r. 1580–1612	Muhammad-Amin	Shuja-ud-Daula r. 1754–1775
Muhammad r. 1612–1626	Saadat Ali Khan r. 1798–1814	Asaf-ud-Daula r. 1775–1797
Abdullah r. 1626–1672	Ghazi-ud-Din r. 1814–1827	Muhammad Ali Shah r. 1837–1842
Abu'l-Hasan r. 1672–1687	Padishah	Nasir-ud-Din r. 1827–1837	Amjad Ali Shah r. 1842–1847
Wajid Ali Shah r. 1847–1856
Birjis Qadr r. 1857–1858

== Yiwa today ==
Descendants of the Yiwa tribe are assimilated into Azerbaijani, Turkish and Turkmen turks. Sizable group of the Yiwa, mostly ethnic Turkmens, also live in the Olat region of Bukhara, Uzbekistan.
