= List of rulers of Qara Qoyunlu =

King of Turcomans
- Tamgha of the Yiwa tribe

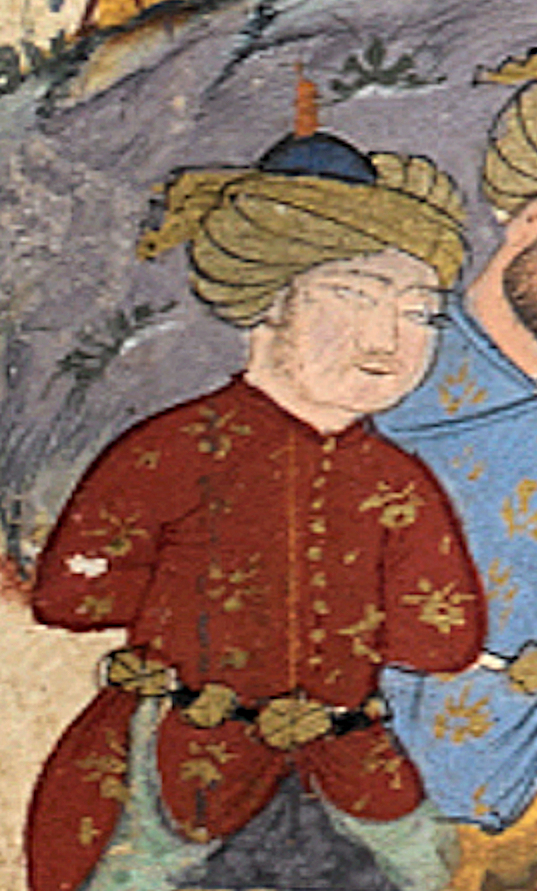
- Last to reign Mirza Yusuf Beg; 1468 – 1469

Details
- Style: Khan; Sultan; Emir; Padishah
- First monarch: Bayram Khwaja Khan (1351–1380)
- Last monarch: Mirza Yusuf Beg (1468–1469)
- Formed: 1374
- Abolished: 1468

”Al-i Qara Qoyunlu” and “Qara Yusifiyyān”(Azerbaijani: Al-i Qara Qoyunlu or Qara Yusifiyyan آلِ قَرَا قَوْیونلو قَرَا یوسِفِیّان) The ruling family of the Qara Qoyunlu descended from the Yıwa tribe of the Oghuz Turks, specifically, the Baharlu tribe. that ruled over the territory comprising present-day Azerbaijan, Armenia, northwestern Iran, eastern Turkey, and northeastern Iraq from about 1374 to 1468. At the same time, they strengthened the Turkic identity of the region by giving Azerbaijan and the Fars region a Turkic identity linguistically and ethnically.

== Titles ==
The Qara Qoyunlu dynasty usually introduced itself in official and written sources as "Baharlu tribe", "Qara Qoyunlu people" or "Turcoman". They were from the Baharlu tribe, which belonged to the Yiva tribe of the Oghuz, and they emphasized this affiliation.

The Qara Qoyunlu rulers often referred to themselves with titles such as "sahibqıran", "sultan", "emir" or "hökmdar-ı Türkmen" (King of Turcoman) and especially tried to emphasize their Turcoman identity. For example, the ruler Qara Yusif and his son Sultan Jahan shah openly expressed their attachment to Turkism in their poems and documents.

Additionally, in 15th-century sources they were also referred to as "Turcoman beys", "rulers of the Turcoman people". These expressions reflect both their ethnic affiliation and the state structure based on tribal confederation.

== Qara Qoyunlu rulers ==
Titular Name	Personal Name	Reign
Bey بیگ	Bayram Khwaja بیرم خواجہ	1374 – 1378 C.E.
Bey بیگ	Qara Muhammad Turemish (Nephew of Bairam Khwaja) قرا محمد ترمش	1378 – 1388 C.E.
Bey بیگ; Abu Nasr ابو النصر	Qara Yusuf Nuyan ibn Qara Muhammad قرا یوسف نوین بن محمد	1388 – 1394 C.E.
Amir Timur invades Kara Koyunlu (1394 – 1405 C.E.)
Bey بیگ; Abu Nasr ابو النصر	Qara Yusuf Nuyan ibn Qara Muhammad قرا یوسف نوین بن محمد	1405 – 1420 C.E.
Bey بیگ	Qara Iskander ibn Yusuf قرا اسکندر بن یوسف	1420 – 1436 C.E.
Bey بیگ	Abu Said Busat ابوسعید	1430 – 1430 C.E.
Bey بیگ	Ispend bin Yusuf اسپند بن یوسف	1420 – 1445 C.E.
Bey بیگ; Muzaffar-al-Din مظفرالدین	Jahan Shah ibn Yusuf جہاں شاہ ابن یوسف	1436- 1447 C.E.
Shahrukh's death and beginning of the Timurid war of succession (1447- 1459 C.E.)
Bey بیگ; Muzaffar-al-Din مظفرالدین	Jahan Shah ibn Yusuf جہاں شاہ ابن یوسف	1447- 1467 C.E.
Bey بیگ	Hasan Ali ibn Jahan Shah حسن علی ابن جہاں شاہ	1467 – 1468 C.E.
Bey بیگ	Mirza Yusuf	1468 – 1469 C.E.
Conquest by the Aq Qoyunlu.

- Yellow Shaded row signifies Progenitor of Qara Qoyunlu dynasty.
- Pink Shaded row signifies Qara Qoyunlu rulers under Timurid vassalage.

== Genealogy of Qara Qoyunlu ==
House of Yiwa

Qara Qoyunlu
Golconda Sultanate
Nawab of Awadh

Mansur
Bayram-Khwaja r. 1374–1380	Tursun	Birdi-Khwaja r. 1380–1380
Muhammad r. 1380–1389
Khwaja-Misr r. 1389–1389	Yusuf I r. 1389–1403, 1405–1420
Pir-Budaq r. 1411–1418	Isfand r. 1420–1421	Iskandar r. 1421–1429, 1431–1438	Abu Sa'id r. 1429–1431	Jahan-Shah r. 1438–1467
Alwand	Hasan-Ali r. 1467–1468	Yusuf II r. 1468–1469
Pir-Quli
Uways-Quli
Sultan-Quli r. 1518–1543	House of Awadh
Jamshid-Quli r. 1543–1550	Ibrahim-Quli r. 1550–1580	Safdar Jang r. 1739–1754
Subhan-Quli r. 1550–1550	Muhammad-Quli r. 1580–1612	Muhammad-Amin	Shuja-ud-Daula r. 1754–1775
Muhammad r. 1612–1626	Saadat Ali Khan r. 1798–1814	Asaf-ud-Daula r. 1775–1797
Abdullah r. 1626–1672	Ghazi-ud-Din r. 1814–1827	Muhammad Ali Shah r. 1837–1842
Abu'l-Hasan r. 1672–1687	Padishah	Nasir-ud-Din r. 1827–1837	Amjad Ali Shah r. 1842–1847
Wajid Ali Shah r. 1847–1856
Birjis Qadr r. 1857–1858
