= Shah Muhammad (Qara Qoyunlu) =

15th-century Ruler of Baghdad (1410/1– 9 April 1433)

Wali of Baghdad
- Reign: 1410/1– 9 April 1433
- Predecessor: Ahmad Jalayir
- Successor: Ispend bin Yusuf
- Died: 5 August 1433; Hamadan
- Issue: Shah Ali; Shah Budaq
- Dynasty: Qara Qoyunlu
- Father: Qara Yusuf

Shah Muhammad (died 5 August 1433) was a 15th century Qara Qoyunlu prince, second son of Qara Yusuf and a governor of Baghdad.

== Early years ==
According to Mamluk historian Ibn Taghribirdi, he grew up in Erbil around Christian community.

== Tenure ==
His tenure in Baghdad is considered as uneventful by historians. He was appointed to this post in 1410 or 1411 by his father. His son, Shah Ali was his subordinate ruling around Mosul. After strengthening his position, he attacked Shahrizor in 1413, ruled by Muhammad Sāru Turkman. After defeating him, he put Saru Turkman in Hit castle prison, while taking his family to Baghdad. He attacked Shushtar in June-July 1415 and defeated last remnants of Jalayirids, but failed to end their reign elsewhere.

He supported his father in his attacks against Timurids in 1414 but started to act independently in 1417, collecting his own taxes. He went as far as claiming his father went crazy in 1420, not supporting him against Shahrukh. Despite that he travelled to Nakhchivan at the time of his father's death, he didn't claim the sultanate, but instead supported Qara Iskander in his struggle to throne.

His son Shah Ali soon rebelled against him and Muhammad was soon deposed by his brother Ispend in 1421 and sent into exile to Hamadan. Using Qara Qoyunlu infighting, Uvais II of Jalayirids attacked and captured Baghdad for a while. Shah Muhammad reacted by attacking and recapturing the city on 3 May 1422, while Uvais was killed by Ispend. Ispend retreated to Dujail sometime, leaving Baghdad to Muhammad. But this time Shah Ali attacked and harassed Ispend. Ispend finally forced Shah Muhammad out of Baghdad on 9 April 1433.

== Exile and death ==
He is reported to have visited Kadhimiya with his second son Shah Budaq, gathering loyal forces to himself and later conquering Mosul and Erbil, presumably from his own son Shah Ali. Although he captured Baqubah, he didn't manage to reconquer Baghdad. His army was routed by Ispend and he was again forced to seek support elsewhere. He was murdered on orders of Baba Haji Hamadani - governor of Gaverud while his son Shah Ali fled to Qara Iskander.

== Religion ==
Muhammad was described as 'a godless unbeliever', 'an atheist' and a convert to Christianity by Ibn Taghribirdi.
