= Capture of Herat (1458) =

- Part of Qara Qoyunlu–Timurid War (1452–1459)
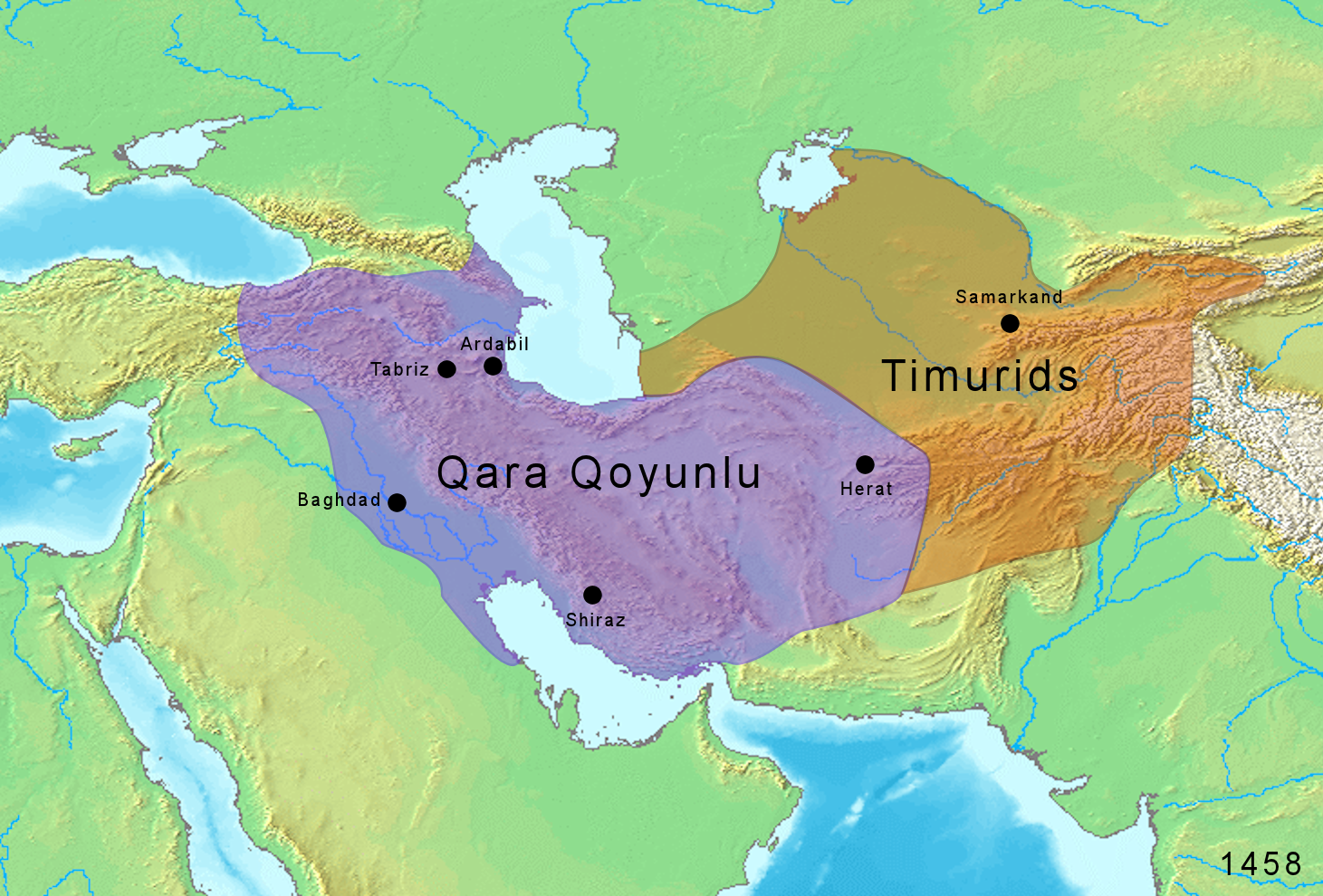
- Maximum extent of Qara Qoyunlu territory ( ) in 1458 under Jahan Shah, including the eastern city of Herat
Date	June–December 1458
Location	Herat, Timurid Empire (Modern Afghanistan)
Result	Qara Qoyunlu victory
Territorial changes	With Herat Astarabad and Mazandaran also captured

Belligerents
Qara Qoyunlu	Timurid Empire

Commanders and leaders
Jahan Shah; Pir Budaq	Abu Sa'id Mirza

The Capture of Herat (Persian: فتح هرات) refers to the Qara Qoyunlu capture of the Timurid Empire capital city of Herat for several months, from June to December 1458.

== Background ==
The Qara Qoynulu expansion into central Iran started with the death of the Timurid ruler Shah Rukh in 1447. As the Timurid Empire was embroiled in uncertainty and succession struggles, Jahan Shah managed to capture the cities of Sultaniya, Hamadan and Qazvin. The death of the Timurid Governor of Persia and Fars Sultan Muhammad in 1451/52 further weakened Timurid control, allowing Jahan Shah to occupy and annex Qum, Isfahan, Abarquh and Shiraz from August 1452, and Yazd in 1453.

Jahan Shah was accompanied by his son Pir Budaq in these campaigns, who became the new Governor for the regions centered around Shiraz and Isfahan.

== Occupation of Herat ==
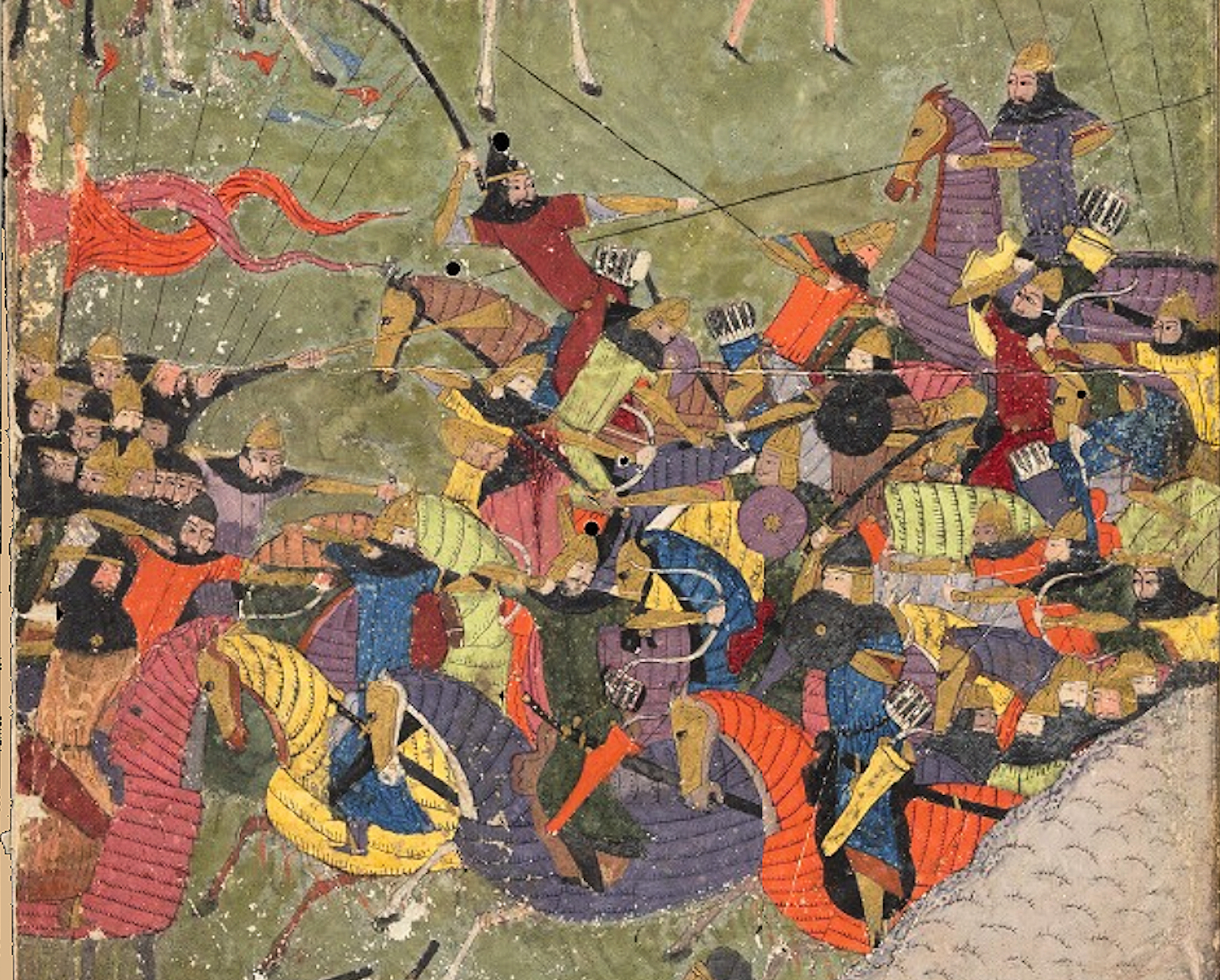
Contemporary depiction of Qara Qoyunlu forces (left) in battle against Timurid forces (right). 1430 Shahnama frontispiece, Bodleian Library.

With the 1457 death in Mashhad of the Timurid Governor of Central Iran Abul-Qasim Babur Mirza, Timurid authority crumbled in Khurasan. Qara Qoyunlu forces advanced towards Herat, the capital of Khurasan, forcing the Timurid prince ʿAlaʾ al-Dawla b. Baysunghur to retreat with his troops, as he was confronted with a much larger Qara Qoyunlu force. Jahanshah entered the city of Herat on June 28, 1458.

Pir Budaq rejoined his father in Herat a few months later, on October 27, 1458. Meanwhile, the Timurid Emperor Abu Saʿid (r. 1452–69) was consolidating his forces to retake the capital. Jahan Shah's position was weakened when news emerged that his rebellious son Husayn ʿAli had escaped from imprisonment in Maku, and was raising an army.

Jahan Shah negotiated with Abu Saʿid, a peace treaty was signed, and Jahan Shah restored the entire province of Khurasan to the control of the Timurids under Abu Saʿid. Abu Saʿid reentered the city of Herat on December 22, 1458. Abu Saʿid further reinforced his control by eliminating Timurid rivals, particularly the sons and grandsons of Baysunghur.

Sultan Husayn, an ally of Abu Saʿid based in Khwarazm, continued to reclaim some territories from the Qara Qoyunlu, capturing Gurgan.

== Artistic influences ==
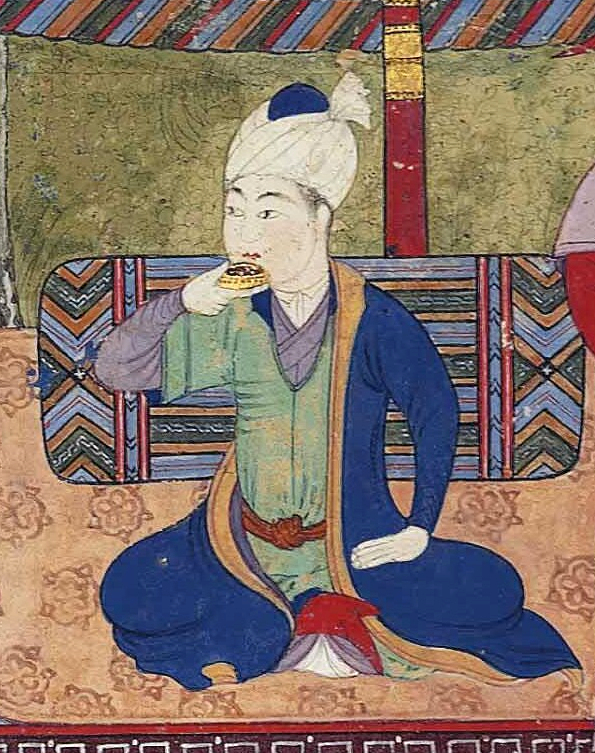
Contemporary depiction of Pir Budaq, son of Jahan Shah, as Governor of Shiraz. Shiraz miniature, c. 1455–1460

Jahan Shah's son Pir Budaq, as Qara Qoyunlu Governor of Fars and Baghdad, was to become extremely active in the production of refined manuscripts. The fact that Pir Budaq had accompanied his father Jahan Shah during the several-months occupation of Timurid Herat in 1458, may have given him the opportunity to get acquainted to the Timurid "art of the book" and to Timurid court artists. For example, Pir Budaq is documented to have brought back from Herat a Timurid Khamsa of Nizami (H.762), which was later expanded by the Aq Qoyunlu in Shiraz and Tabriz. Under Pir Budaq, several innovations were made in the calligraphy of nasta'liq writing, and manuscripts were finely illustrated along Khorasan pictorial conventions.

Qara Qoyunlu architecture is often richly decorated, but the tilework designs of the Blue Mosque in Tabriz, completed in 1465, are particularly innovative, and may have been influenced by architects from the Timurid capital of Herat having moved to Tabriz following the 1458 capture of the city.
