= Abu Said (Qara Qoyunlu) =

- Sultan of Qara Qoyunlu

Sultan of Qara Qoyunlu
- Reign: 1430 – 1430 (two months)
- Predecessor: Qara Iskander
- Successor: Qara Iskander
- Died: 1430
- Dynasty: Qara Qoyunlu
- Father: Qara Yusuf
- Religion: Shia Islam

Abu Said (Note: Ajami Turkic and Persian: ابوسعید) was a ruler of the Qara Qoyunlu who ruled briefly under the suzerainty of the Timurids. He was a governor of Erzincan during Qara Yusuf's reign. He was present at the Battle of Salmas on 18 September 1429, where he submitted to the Timurid ruler Shah Rukh. He was awarded with recognition as the nominal Qara Qoyunlu ruler. However he was soon killed by his brother Qara Iskander after Shah Rukh's withdrawal in 1430.
