= Qara Yusuf =

Sultan of Qara Qoyunlu from 1389 to 1420

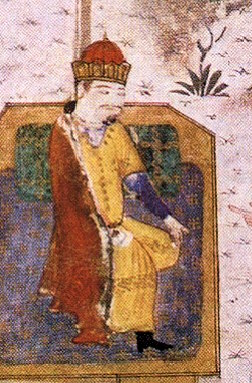
- Qara Yusuf enthroned, Tarikh-i Turkmaniyah, 16th century

Sultan of Qara Qoyunlu
- Reign: 1389–1420
- Predecessor: Qara Mahammad
- Successor: Qara Iskander
- Co-sultan: Pirbudag (1411–1418)
- Born: 1356 or 1357; Erciş
- Died: 17 November 1420 (aged 62–63); Ujan pastures, Tabriz
- Burial: Erciş, Turkey
- Issue: Pirbudag; Ispend bin Yusuf; Iskander; Jahan Shah; Abu Said
- Dynasty: Qara Qoyunlu
- Father: Qara Mahammad
- Religion: Islam (disputed whether Sunni or Shia)

Abu Nasr Qara Yusuf ibn Mohammad Barani (Azerbaijani:ابوالنصر قرا يوسف (c. 1356 – 1420) was the ruler of the Qara Qoyunlu dynasty from c. 1388 to 1420, although his reign was interrupted by Tamerlane's invasion (1400–1405). He was the son of Qara Mahammad Töremish, a brother-in-law to Ahmad Jalayir.

== Rise to chiefdom ==
After his father's death in rebellion by Pir Hasan, Qara Qoyunlu elders gathered to choose his brother Khwaja Misr, however more energetic Qara Yusuf prevailed in succession. He made short-term alliance with Kara Osman against Pir Hasan and crushed his forces.

== Early reign ==
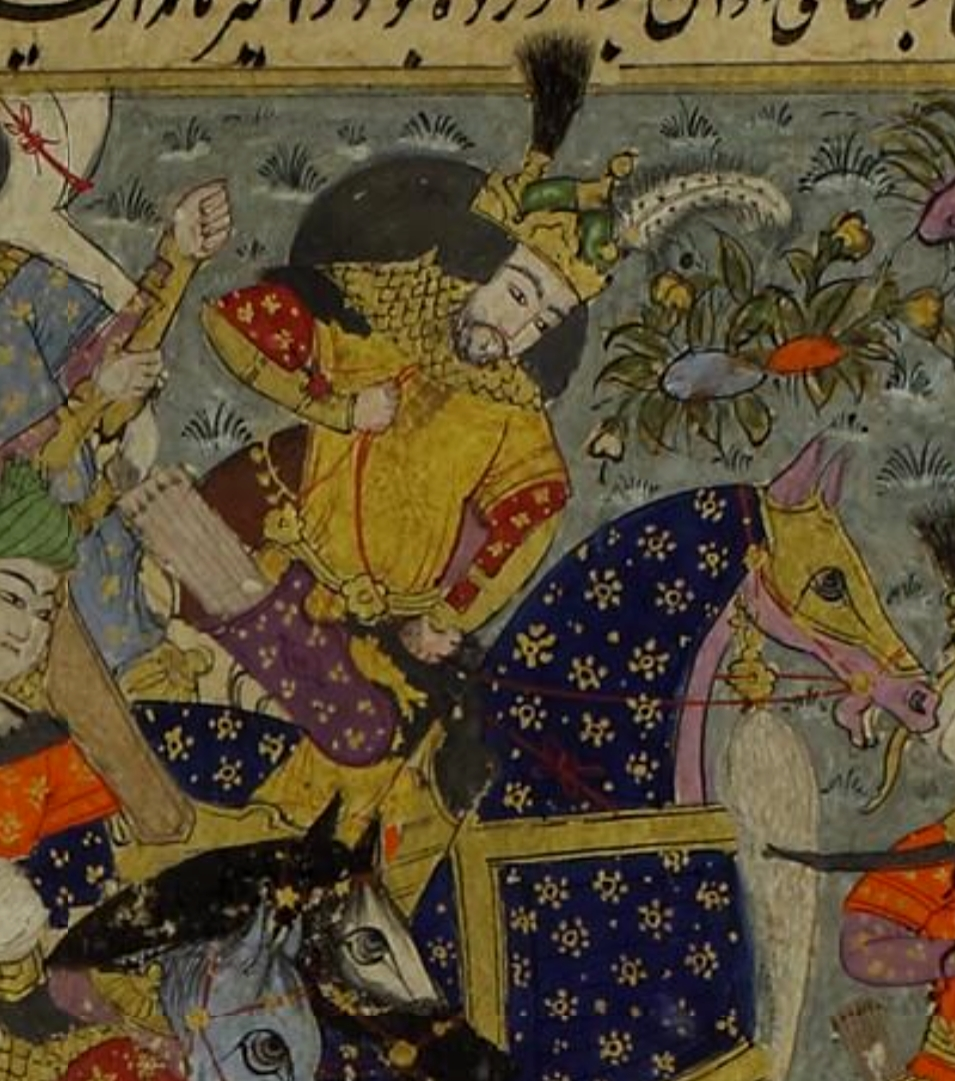
Qara Yusuf in battle (1400) Tarikh-i Turkmaniyya

At the beginning of Qara Yusuf's reign, the Qara Qoyunlu established an alliance with the Jalayirid dynasty in Baghdad and Tabriz against Aq Qoyunlu. However, he was soon captured and jailed in Suşehri. Not long after, he was released after his aunt Tatar Hatun paid ransom to Qara Yuluq. Soon Jalayirids and Qara Qoyunlu both were threatened by the Timurids from the east. In 1393 Timur conquered Baghdad and 3 years later appointed his son Miran Shah as viceroy of Azerbaijan. In 1394, Timur imprisoned Khwaja Misr and sent him to Samarkand.

By collaborating on equal terms with the Sultan Ahmed Jalayir against the Timurids, Qara Yusuf effectively secured the independence of the Qara Qoyunlu.

=== The Timurid Invasion ===
The Timurids began another campaign in 1400 and defeated both the Qara Qoyunlu and the Jalayirids. Qara Yusuf and Sultan Ahmed Jalayir both fled and took refuge with the Mamluks first, then Ottoman Sultan Bayezid I. In 1402 they returned to Mesopotamia together with an army following the Battle of Ankara. However, once they had retaken control of Baghdad they quarreled, and Qara Yusuf expelled Sultan Ahmed Jalayir from the city. Sultan Ahmed Jalayir took refuge with the Nasir-ad-Din Faraj the Sultan of Mamluk Egypt, but he imprisoned him out of fear of Timur. In 1403 the Timurids defeated Qara Yusuf at the Battle of Algami Canal and drove him out of Baghdad again, also killing his brother Yar Ali which made him to seek asylum in Damascus, which was then ruled by Mamluk Egypt.

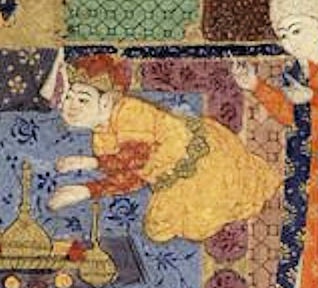
Qara Yusuf at the Mamluk court, with Ahmad Jalayir. Tarikh-i Turkmaniyah, 16th century

Soon they were both imprisoned on the order of Nasir-ad-Din Faraj. Together in prison, the two leaders renewed their friendship, making an agreement that Sultan Ahmed Jalayir should keep Baghdad while Qara Yusuf would have Azerbaijan. Ahmad also adopted his son Pirbudag. When Timur died in 1405 Nasir-ad-Din Faraj released them both. However, according to Faruk Sümer, they were released on the orders of the rebellious wali of Damascus – Shaykh Mahmud.

Qara Yusuf, having returned from exile in Mamluk Egypt and went back to Anatolia. He forced Timur's governor in Van Izzaddin Shir to submit, while capturing Altamış, another viceroy set up by Timur and sending him to Barquq's court in Cairo. He later moved on to Azerbaijan. He defeated the Timurid Abu Bakr at the Battle of Nakhchivan on 14 October 1406 and reoccupied Tabriz. In 1407 he raided Georgia, took 15,000 prisoners and killed Giorgi VII. Abu Bakr and his father Miran Shah tried to recapture Azerbaijan, but on 20 April 1408, Qara Yusuf inflicted a decisive defeat on them at the Battle of Sardrud in which Miran Shah was killed. This battle, one of the most important in the history of the Orient, nullified the results of Timur's conquests in the West.

In 1409 he entered Tabriz and sent a raiding party to Shirvan, especially Shaki, which was fruitless. Another invasion force was sent to capture Sultaniyya and Qazvin under the command of Rustam Beg. The same year, he marched to Anatolia and deposed Salih Şihabeddin Ahmed (thus ending the Mardin branch of the Artuqids in northern Mesopotamia), who was then married to a daughter of Yusuf and sent to govern Mosul.

== Defeating Jalayirids ==
Having firmly established as a ruler of Azerbaijan with Tabriz as his capital, Qara Yusuf fell foul of his former ally Sultan Ahmed Jalayir. Sultan Ahmed Jalayir tried to seize Azerbaijan, but was defeated near Tabriz on 30 August 1410. He was captured and forced to abdicate in favor of Pirbudag (7 year old biological son of Qara Yusuf) and to appoint Shah Muhammad (another son of Qara Yusuf) to be governor of Baghdad. He was executed the next day passing Iraq into the hands of Qara Yusuf after Bistam Beg urged him. Qara Yusuf declared his son as "sultan" and crowned him in 1411, however he was still in charge as regent.

== Later reign ==
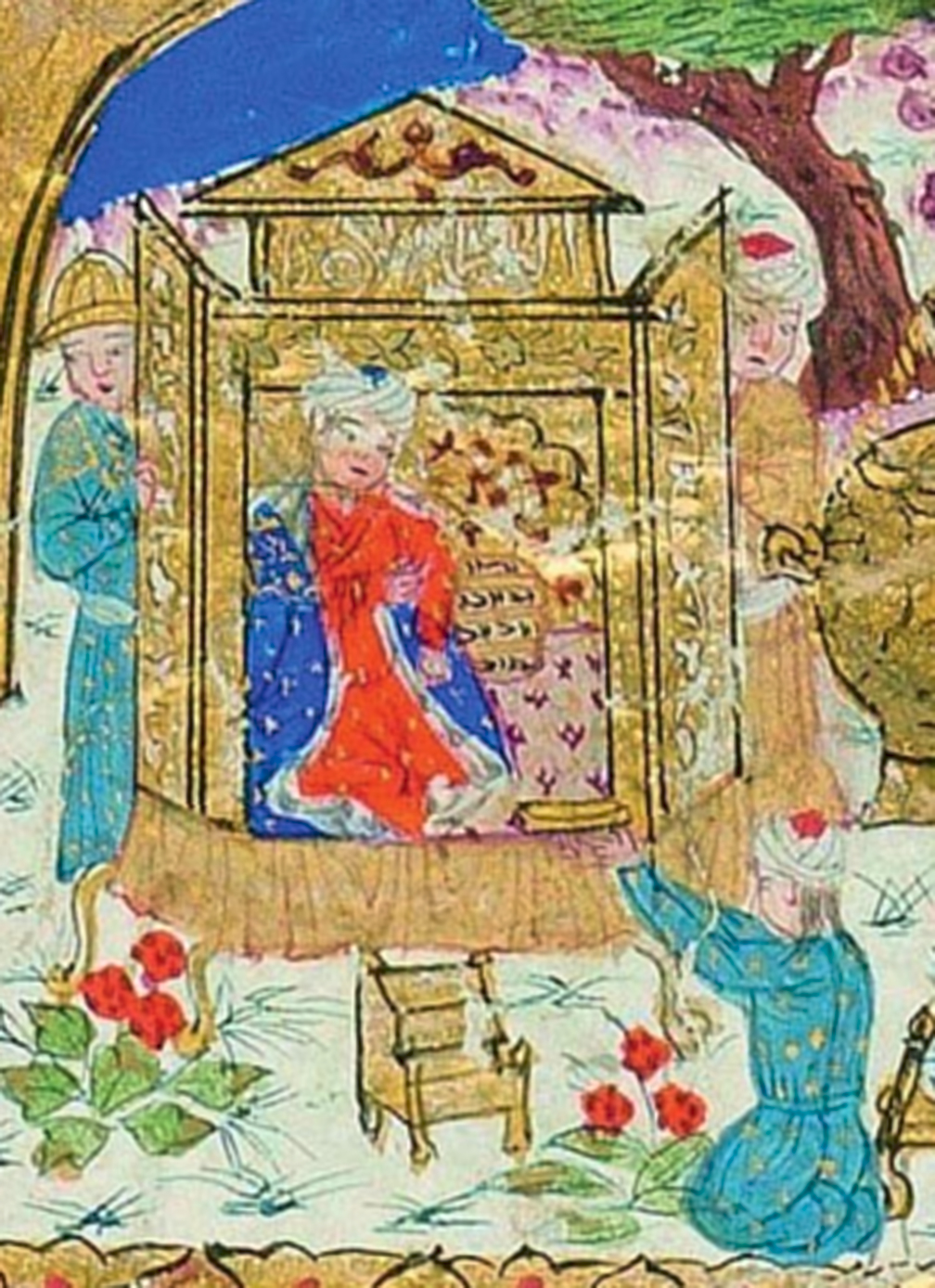
Likely contemporary depiction of Pirbudag, the first Qara Qoyunlu Sultan and son of Qara Yusuf. The Monastery, 1407-08 (Topkapı Palace Museum, TSMK H.2153, f.131b).

Further consolidating his rule, he marched on Shirvan, where Shirvanshah Ibrahim, a loyal Timurid vassal was still reigning. The combined forces of Constantine I, Ibrahim and Syed Ahmed Orlat (lord of Shaki) were defeated on Battle of Chalagan, 1412. He later revoked the governorship of Soltaniyeh from Bistam Beg and bestowed it on Jahan shah in 1415. He repeatedly defeated Qara Osman in 1417 and on 20 September 1418. He also made raids into Aintab which was then under Mamluk rule in response to them granting asylum to Qara Osman.

In October 1418, his son and nominal sultan Pirbudag died, which left Qara Yusuf in grief for days. He tried to forge an anti-Timurid alliance with Mehmed I in 1420 unsuccessfully. According to Ghiyāth al-dīn Naqqāsh – Timurid envoy to Ming China, he also sent an emissary to Yongle Emperor around the same time.

== Death ==
He died on his way to battle Shahrukh (who demanded his submission) on 17 November 1420. According to Ahmad Faridun Bey's "Munshat-us-Salatin" Shahrukh's Fathnama ("term used to denote proclamations and letters announcing victories in battle or the successful conclusion of military campaigns" according to Encyclopædia Iranica) sent to Mehmed I, right after Qara Yusuf's death his treasury was stolen by his nephews Qazan beg (Khwaja Misr's son) and Zeynal beg and taken to Avnik. Shah Muhammad and Qara Iskander retreated to Ganja and Barda. While Jahan Shah took his father's body to be buried in his ancestral town Erciş.

== Aftermath ==
After the death of Qara Yusuf in December 1420, Shahrukh Mirza tried to take Azerbaijan from Qara Yusuf's son Qara Iskander, using the fact that none of his sons were accompanying their father. Despite defeating Iskander, twice, in 1420–21 and 1429, only in the third expedition of Shahrukh Mirza in 1434–35 did the Timurids succeed, when he entrusted the government to Iskander's own brother, Jahan Shah as his vassal.

== Family ==
He was married to a daughter of Manuel III of Trebizond. He was also married to Timur's great-granddaughter, a daughter of Abu Bakr, son of Miran Shah. Following Qara Yusuf's death, she was remarried by Shah Rukh to Khalilullah I of Shirvan.

=== Sons ===
- Pirbudag (1403 – 1418)
- Shah Muhammad – wali of Baghdad
- Qara Iskander
- Jahan Shah – wali of Soltaniyeh
- Abu Said – wali of Erzincan c. 1420
- Amir Isfahan – wali of Baghdad

=== Daughters ===
- Unnamed daughter married to Shamsaldin – Emir of Bitlis

== See also ==
- List of rulers of Qara Qoyunlu
  Preceded by Qara Mahammad	Sultan of Qara Qoyunlu; 1410–1420	Succeeded by Qara Iskander
