= Alvand Mirza (Qara Qoyunlu) =

- Mirza

Dargha of Asadabad
- Born: Alvand Mirza
- Died: 1470; Asadabad, Iran, Hamadan province
- Issue: Pirguli Beg
- Dynasty: Qara Qoyunlu
- Father: Qara Iskander
- Religion: Islam

Alvand Mirza was a member of the Qara Qoyunlu dynasty, the son of Qara Iskander, the ruler of Mosul, Diyarbakir, and Asadabad.

He was the paternal great-grandfather of Quli Qutb Shah, founder of the Sultanate of Golconda.

== Early life ==
Alvand Mirza was appointed to rule Mosul during his uncle Jahan Shah's reign. Mirza rebelled against the latter and was forced to flee to the Aq Qoyunlu, then under the rule of Jahangir Beg. Jahan Shah demanded that his rebellious nephew be handed over to him, but Jahangir Beg refused. Jahan Shah then invaded Erzincan and sent his grandnephew, Rustem Beg, to subdue Jahangir Beg. Hopelessly, Jahangir Beg sent his mother Sara Khatun to Mamluk Egypt, while Jahan Shah started to support his half-brother Sheikh Hasan. Sheikh Hasan was killed by Uzun Hasan, brother of Jahangir Beg; Jahan Shah quickly offered peace to Aq Qoyunlu, in return for accepting their submission. Jahangir Beg accepted and also wed his daughter to Jahan Shah's son Mirza Muhammad.

== In Timurid service ==
Upon the Aq Qoyunlu's submission, Alvand Mirza left for Shiraz with his son Pirguli in a bid to join the Timurid ruler Babur. He was made a commander in the Timurid army and joined Babur in a siege of Samarkand in 1454. He was sent by Babur to conquer Sistan and Kirman. After defeating Jahan Shah's generals Amir Bayazid and Shahsevar Beg, they were soon followed by his son Mirza Yusuf. Clashes stopped after Babur's death on 25 March 1457, followed by Jahan Shah's conquest of Khorasan.

== Again in Jahan Shah's service ==
After Jahan Shah's capture of Herat, Alvand resubmitted to his uncle in hopes of retaining Kirman. Jahan Shah however, only granted him Asadabad. Mirza Yusuf's daughter Khadija Begum was wed to Pirguli Beg. Alvand left Kirman to Jahan Shah's general Mansur Beg Turkman. Alvand Mirza died here after living in Asadabad for two years. After his death, his son Pirguli Beg succeeded him.

== Family ==
He had two sons:

- Pirquli Beg - married to Khadija Begum (granddaughter of Jahan Shah); their grandson was Quli Qutb Shah, who established the Sultanate of Golconda.
- Allahquli Beg

== See also ==
- Qutb Shahi dynasty
