= Pirbudag =

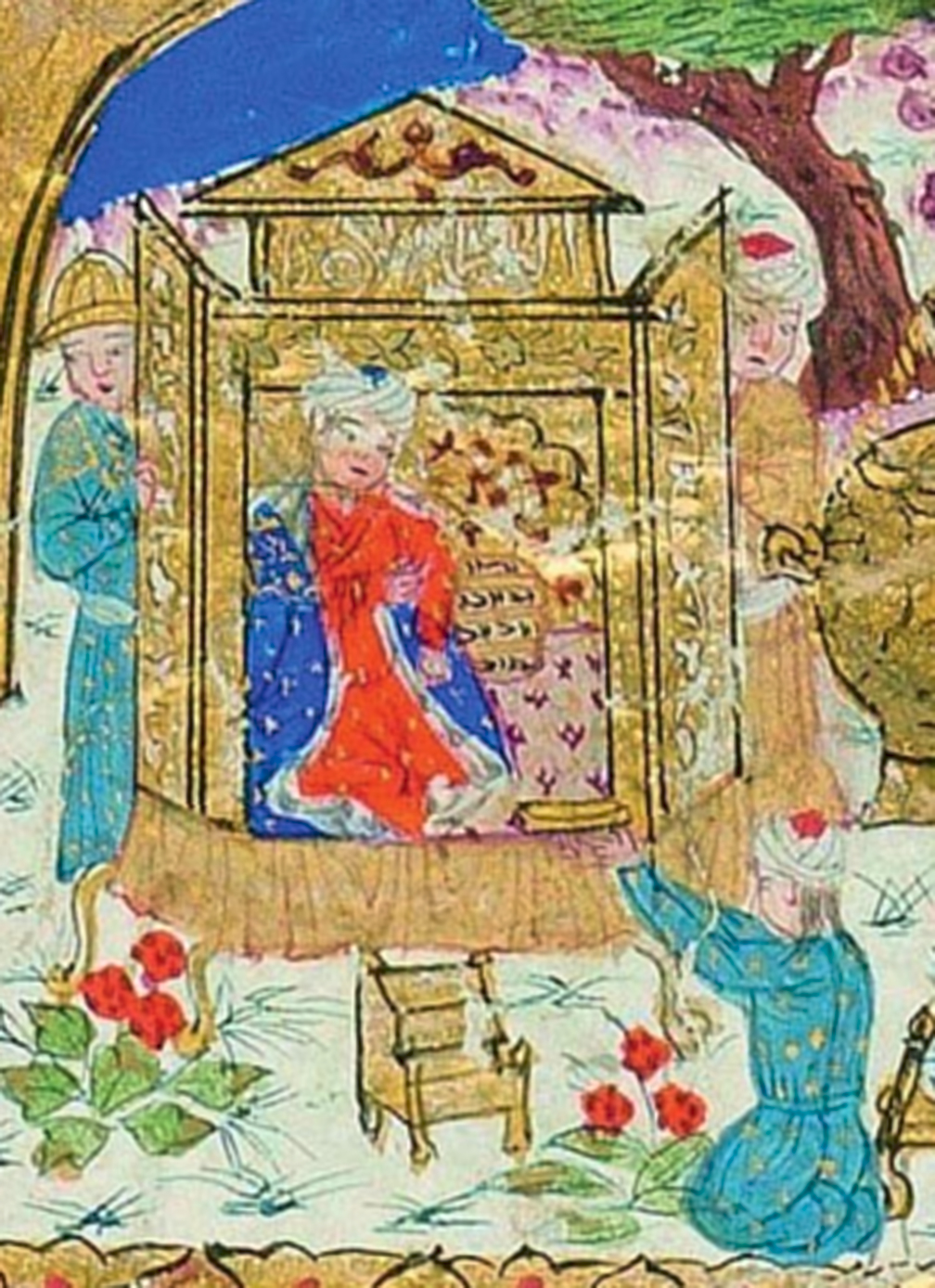
- Likely contemporary depiction of Pirbudag. The Monastery, 1407-08 (Topkapı Palace Museum, TSMK H.2153, f.131b)

Sultan of Qara Qoyunlu
- Reign: 1411 – 1418
- Predecessor: Qara Yusuf
- Successor: Qara Yusuf
- Co-sultan: Qara Yusuf
- Born: 1403 or 1404; Damascus
- Died: October 1418 (aged 14–15); Tabriz
- Dynasty: Qara Qoyunlu
- Father: Qara Yusuf
- Religion: Islam

Pirbudag (1403/1404 – October 1418, reigned 1411 – October 1414) was the first ruler of Qara Qoyunlu as an independent sultanate.

== Life ==
Pirbudag was the eldest son of Qara Yusuf, born around 1403 during his father's captivity, together with Ahmad Jalayir, in Damascus. In prison the two leaders renewed their friendship, making an agreement that Jalayir should keep Baghdad while Qara Yusuf would have Azerbaijan.

== Reign ==
After the death of Ahmad Jalayir, Pirbudag was crowned sultan by his father Qara Yusuf in 1411 at the age of eight or nine. He is recorded to have been the commander of raiding party in Aintab pursuing Qara Osman. He died unexpectedly in October 1418.
