= Baharlu (ethnic group) =

Turkic ethnic group living primarily in Iran

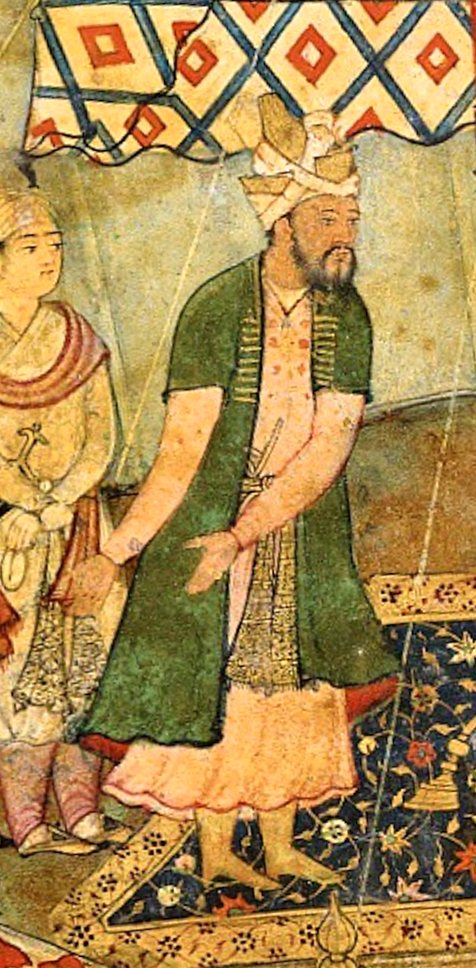
Bairam Khan (1501–1561) was a Baharlu Turkman in the service of the Mughal Empire.

The Baharlu (Azerbaijani: بهارلی; Persian: بهارلو), also spelled Bahārlou, Baharloo, Baharlooe, are a Turkic tribe living in Hamadan, Fars, Kerman, Azerbaijan and Khorasan in Iran. Fars embraces the bulk of Baharlu tribe members and is identified as the provenance of the tribe.

In the period following the collapse of the Qara Qoyunlu Empire, the Bahārlūs who remained in western Iran, along with several other Qara Qoyunlu tribes, gradually settled in Azerbaijan. It appears they collaborated with the Aq Qoyunlu; indeed, there is mention of a Ḥasan Beg Šakaroḡlū who was an ally of the Aq Qoyunlu ruler Alvand Beg when he was attacked by Shah Ismail I Safavid in Nahjavan in 1501-02. According to J. Malcolm, the Baharlu were originally a branch of the Shamlu tribe. The Shamli were considered one of the main Qizilbash tribes. Vladimir Minorski believes that the name Baharlı is another name for the Baranlı or Barani tribe, from which the ruling dynasty of the Qara Qoyunlu state originated, and that they separated from the Yiwa tribe. The Baharlu were historically part of the Khamseh confederation.

== See also ==
- Darab
- Qashqai
- Iranian Turks
- Qara Qoyunlu
