= Iskandar (Qara Qoyunlu) =

Sultan of Qara Qoyunlu

Qara Iskander
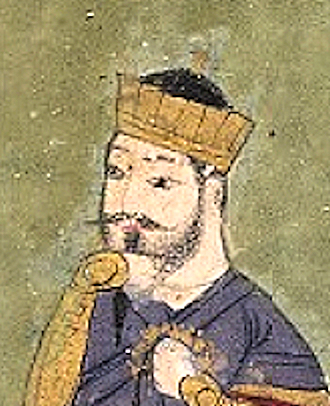
- Contemporary depiction of Qara Iskandar, c. 1430

Sultan of Qara Qoyunlu
- First reign: 1421–1429
- Coronation: 2 July 1421
- Predecessor: Qara Yusuf
- Successor: Abu Said
- Second reign: 1431 – 1436
- Predecessor: Abu Said
- Successor: Jahan Shah
- Died: 1436; Alinja Tower
- Burial: Ahi Sadaddin Tower, Vinyanguh district, Tabriz
- Dynasty: Qara Qoyunlu
- Father: Qara Yusuf
- Religion: Islam

Qara Iskandar (Azerbaijani: قارا اسکندر; Persian: قرا اسکندر) was the ruler of the Qara Qoyunlu tribal confederation from 1420 to 1436. His struggles with the Timurid ruler Shah Rukh show that he was a brave leader, but he was not able to continue developing what he inherited from his father Qara Yusuf; his reign also saw the decline of the Qara Qoyunlu.

== During Qara Yusuf's reign ==
Details about his early years is not known, including where and when he was born. He was third son of Qara Yusuf and a full brother of Ispend. He was appointed wali of Kirkuk and his first appearance was in 1416, where he defeated Qara Osman when he was besieging Erzincan.

== Succession ==
Qara Yusuf's death in 1420 left his sons Ispend bin Yusuf, Iskander, Jahan Shah and Abu Said fighting over the succession. The Sa'dlu tribe, one of the main sub-tribes of the Qara Qoyunlu, declared Ispend—who was in Chokhur-e Sa'd province at that time— as their new chief. Abu Sa'id had to flee and Jahan Shah went to Baghdad. Iskander on the other hand was supported by his brother Shah Muhammad, who was governing Baghdad at that time. Soon Iskandar was crowned on 2 July 1421 with Qara Qoyunlu amirs Amir Qara and Qadam Pasha in Alinja Tower. Soon Ispend also swore fealty to him and they joined to fight the Aq Qoyunlu who were invading from the west, and defeated them.

== Timurid invasions ==
The Timurid Shah Rukh took advantage of the weakened state of the Qara Qoyunlu to invade their land, crossing the Aras River and battling the forces of Iskander and Ispend at Yakhsi in the Battle of Alashkert. Timurid forces were almost defeated when Amir Shahmalik cut heads of two slain soldiers and tricked both into thinking his brother was killed. Iskander's forces retreated to Kirkuk.

Meanwhile, Shah Rukh briefly occupied Azerbaijan and Armenia but then withdrew once more to Khorasan, appointing Qara Osman's son Jalaladdin Ali beg as his viceroy. At this point, Ispend quickly re-occupied Nakhchivan and Tabriz. However Iskander followed him and fought with him, taking the city and establishing himself as sole ruler of the Qara Qoyunlu.

== End of first reign ==
Having secured his rule in Azerbaijan, he quickly made punitive expeditions against local rulers. Firstly defeating and killing Kurdish emir Malik Muhammad and his 20.000 strong army in Hakkari. Hearing this regional rulers - namely Malik Sharaf-al Din of Akhlat, Qara Osman and some Kurdhish chiefs made an alliance and marched on Ardabil unsuccessfully. Sharaf-al Din was executed on spot. In 1425 brothers of Khalilullah I - Keygobad, Ishaq and Hashim - revolted in Shirvan, shah requested help from Qara Iskander. He used this opportunity to lay waste and raid Shirvan, also in response of Khalilullah's support to Shah Rukh back in 1421. Later he made another punitive expedition on Khwaja Yusuf, a governor of Soltaniyeh appointed by Shah Rukh in 1428.

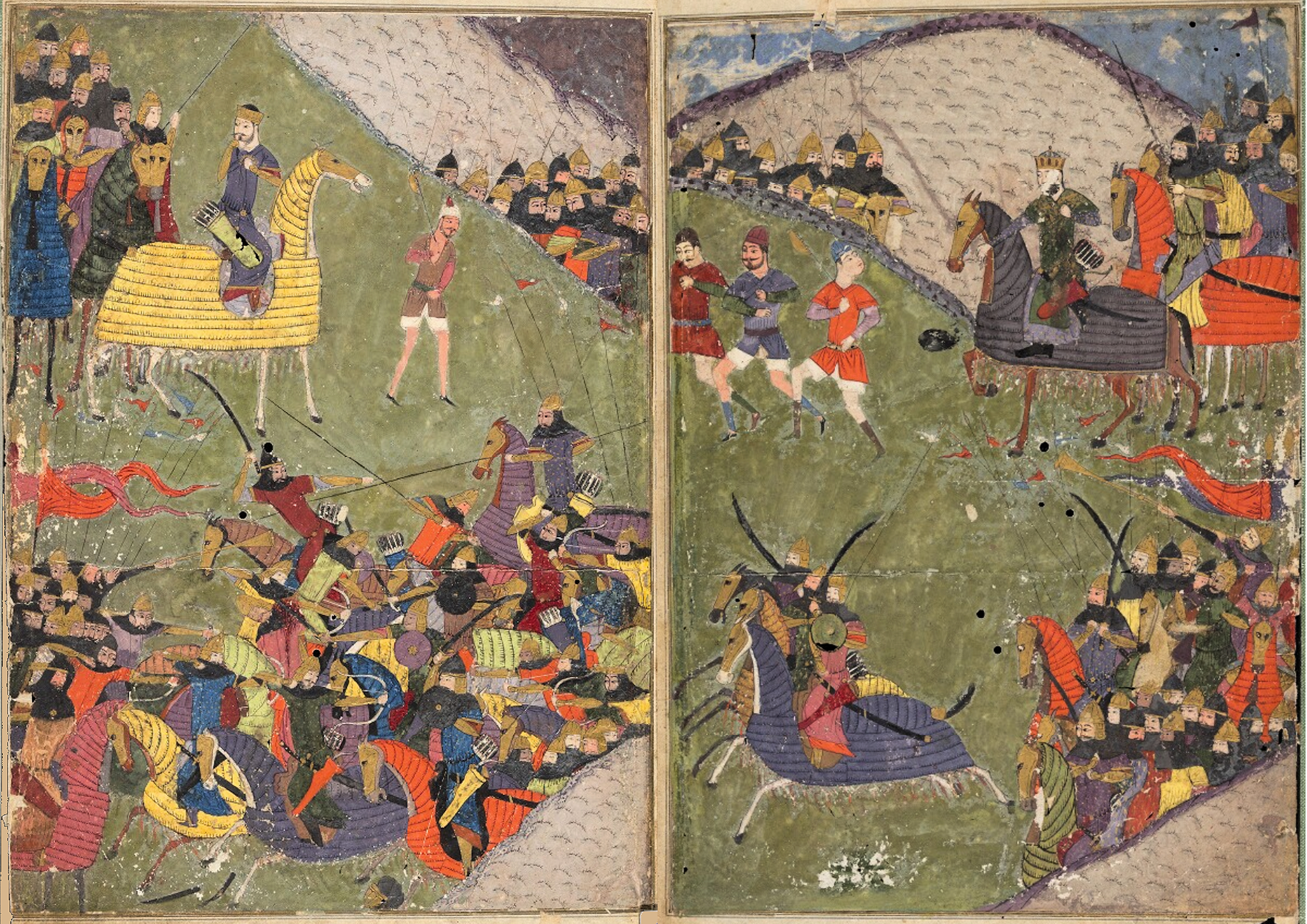
Iskandar ibn Qara Yusuf (left) in battle against the Timurid Ibrahim Sultan (right) in April 1429. Shahnama (1430), Bodleian Library, ms. Add 176, folios 6r-7v.

When news reached Shah Rukh, he sent Emir Aliya Kukaltash in 1428 to the region. He himself commanded a 100,000 strong army in 1429 and arrived in Salmas. Qara Iskander's half brother Abu Said withdrew in the midst of the battle and submitted to Shah Rukh on 18 September 1429. This serious blow to Iskander forced the Qara Qoyunlu to retreat back to the Diyar Bakr. Shah Rukh occupied Tabriz and installed Abu Said as ruling prince of the Qara Qoyunlu.

== Second reign ==
Qara Iskander hastily marched on Abu Said in 1431 and killed him, installing himself again as a sole ruler. He appointed his son Yar Ali to govern Van. Who was a cruel ruler, heavily taxing Armenians. After numerous complaints and his recall to palace, afraid Yar Ali fled to Shirvan, where he was captured and was turned over to Timurids. His first destination was Herat and then Samarqand. Furious Iskander made another punitive expedition on Khalilullah I and subsequently devastated Shirvan. Khalilullah appealed to Shah Rukh in turn and asked for assistance, himself travelling to Rey with his daughter.

Answering the pleads, Shah Rukh once more invaded Qara Qoyunlu and forced Qara Iskander to flee. He was ambushed by Qara Osman en route, who was aided by Muhammad Juki (son of Shah Rukh) in Adilcevaz. Battle was a disaster for Aq Qoyunlu, in which Osman was killed. He further fled to Murad II, who appointed him as a governor of Tokat, however he declined and gathered his forces to go back to Tabriz.

In 1436 Shah Rukh once more installed a Timurid governor in Tabriz, this time Qara Iskander's brother Jahan Shah. Iskander marched on Tabriz but was defeated by Jahan Shah at Sufiyan to the north of the city, having been betrayed by some of his emirs - one of them being his nephew Shah Ali (son of Shah Muhammad). He then fled and took refuge in the castle of Alinja. Jahan Shah besieged the castle and during the siege Iskander used a last chance to ally with Mamluks. However he was murdered by his own son Shah Kubad before they reached for help.

== Family ==
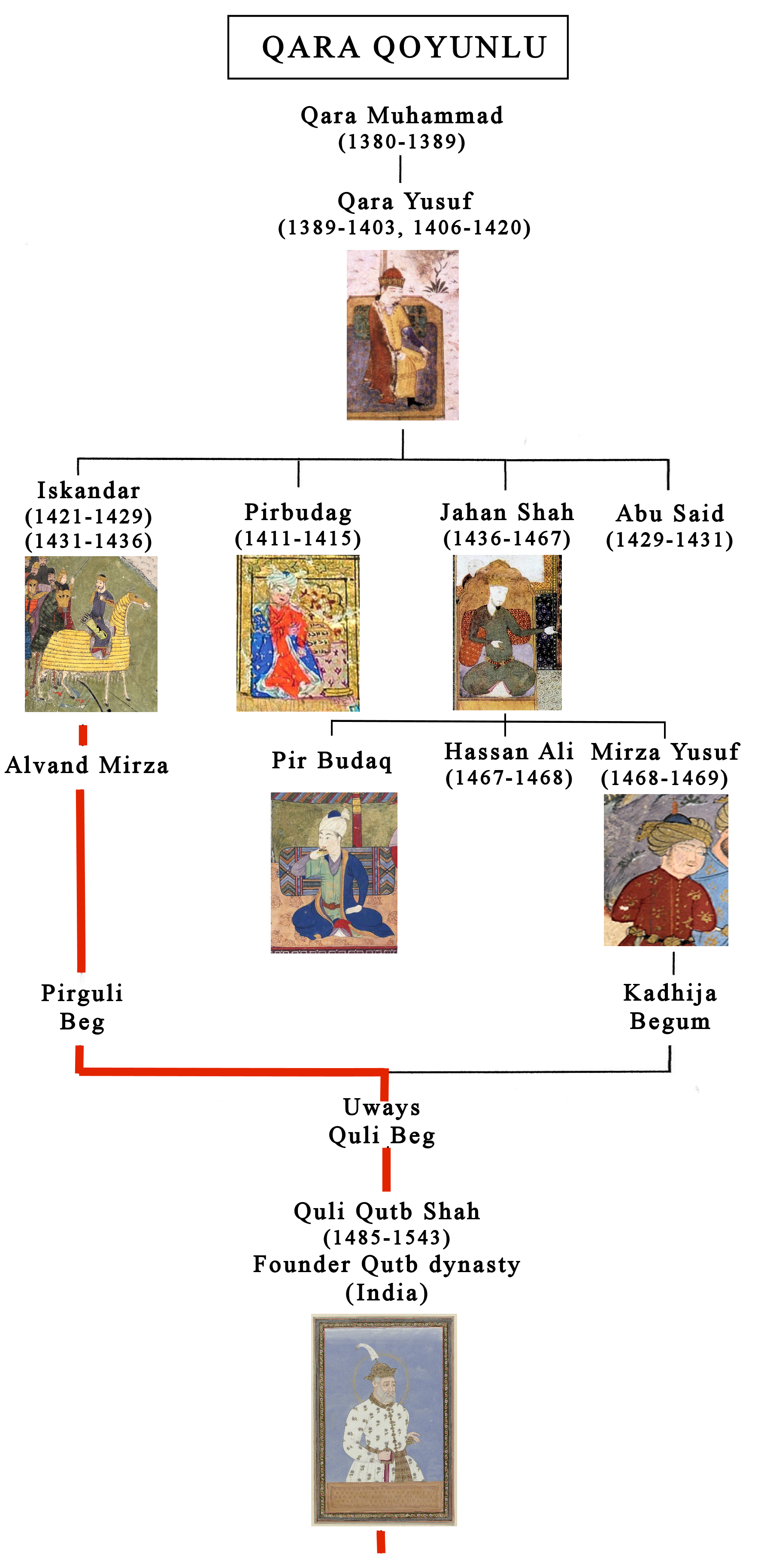
Qara Iskander genealogy, from his ancestors to his descendants the Indian dynasty of the Qutbshahis

Sons:

- Alvand Mirza - ancestor of the Indian dynasty of the Qutbshahis
- Yar Ali
- Malik Qasim
- Hasan beg
- Shah Qubad - executed on 23 April 1438 by Jahan Shah.
- Husayn Ali
- Asad
- Rustam
- Tarkhan
- Malik Muhammad

Daughters:

- Arayish begum
- Shahsaray begum

== Sources ==
- Manz, Beatrice Forbes (2007). Power, Politics and Religion in Timurid Iran. Cambridge University Press. ISBN 978-1-139-46284-6.
- Subtelny, Maria (2007). Timurids in Transition: Turko-Persian Politics and Acculturation in Medieval Iran. Brill. ISBN 978-90-04-16031-6.
- Sümer, Faruk (1984). Kara Koyunlular (in Turkish). Ankara: Türk Tarih Kurumu

Preceded by Qara Yusuf	Qara Qoyunlu Beys; 1420–36	Succeeded by Jahan Shah
