= Ispend bin Yusuf =

Ruler of Baghdad
- Reign: 1433 – 1445
- Coronation: 9 April 1433
- Predecessor: Shah Muhammad
- Successor: Fulad Mirza
- Died: 8 March 1445; Baghdad
- Dynasty: Kara Koyunlu
- Father: Qara Yusuf
- Religion: Shia

Ispend bin Yusuf (Persian: اسپند میرزا Azerbaijani: اسپند بن یوسف), referred to during his reign as the Amir Isfahan, was the second son of Qara Yusuf after Pirbudag, brother of Qara Iskander. He was the judge of Baghdad in 1433–1445.

== Life ==
In 1410, he participated in the battle with Sultan Ahmad Jalayir and commanded the left wing of the Qara Qoyunlu army. In 1420, when Qara Yusuf started moving from Tabriz to welcome Sultan Shahrukh, Amir Isfahan was ruling in Adilcevaz, but did not provide assistance to his father with troops. After Qara Yusuf's death, his corpse was first taken to Nakhchivan and then to Chukhursad. There, the Saad tribe declared him a candidate for rule, and Qara Yusuf's treasury fell into the hands of Amir Isfahan.

Orders were given by Shahrukh for Mirza Ibrahim Sultan and Amir Shahmelik to move to Nakhchivan and Salmat to capture Amir Isfahan with 20,000 cavalry. Meanwhile, Isfahan's envoys arrived at Shahrukh's camp and presented a letter of allegiance. Following this, Shahrukh ceased their attack.

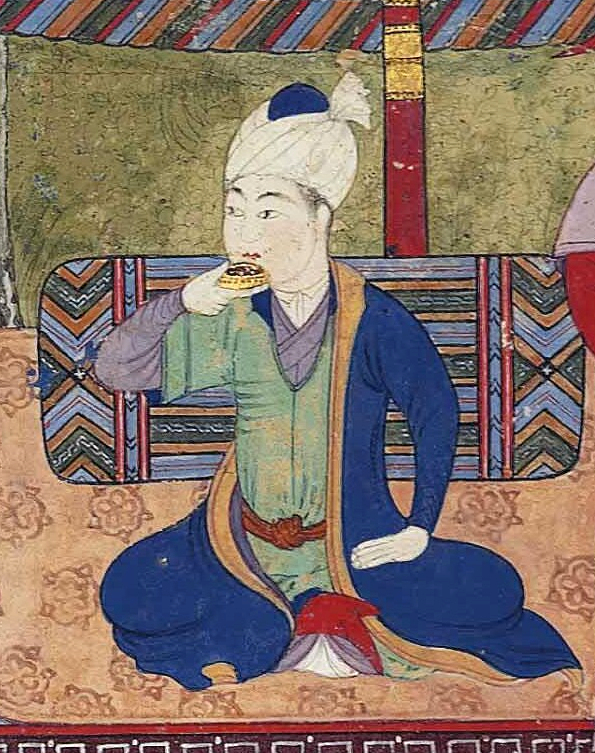
Pir Budaq was the elder brother of Ispend. Shiraz, c. 1455–1460

His brother, Iskander's re-establishment of control over the Qara Qoyunlu territories sparked Shahrukh's new campaign into Azerbaijan. In the Battle of Alashkert in 1421, Amir Isfahan led the left flank of the Qara Qoyunlu army. The Qara Qoyunlu forces suffered a defeat in the battle. Taking advantage of the separation of Qara Iskandar, Amir Isfahan returned to Khurasan from Shahrukh's side and took control of Nakhchivan and Tabriz, establishing independent rule.

=== During the rule of Iraq ===
While Amir Isfahan was in Azerbaijan, Qara Iskander was in Tovuk and Kirkuk. When he heard this news, he moved towards Tabriz. Amir Isfahan, avoiding resisting his brother, retreated to Erzurum and Avnik fortress.

In 1431 combatted the last Jalayerid ruler, Ḥosayn II ibn ʿAlāʾ-al-Dawla, who had lost internal support due to his licentious behavior. Ḥosayn's amirs invited prince Ispend, who managed to capture the Jalayirid base in al-Ḥella in southern Iraq in October 1431. Hosayn was pursued and finally killed on 9 November 1431, bringing a complete end to the dynasty.

==== The struggle with Shahmehmud ====
Qara Yusuf died in 1420 while on a journey to meet Teymuri Shahruk. When Shahmohammed heard about his father's death, he was sent to Nakhchivan, believed to be preparing for an imminent conflict for the throne. However, contrary to expectations, he refused this claim and declined to receive the emirs who had plundered his father's tent and showed disrespect to his corpse. At the time of Qara Yusuf's death, his brothers, Amir Isfahan and Iskander, were in Kirkuk and Adilcevaz, respectively. Shahmohammed was compelled to return due to his son Shahali's rebellion. Additionally, in 1421, Amir Isfahan had initiated the occupation of Arab Iraq. Interestingly, Shahmohammed didn't resist his brother either, stating that Baghdad sufficed for him. Although Amir Isfahan was removed from Baghdad by the Celairi Oveys, ultimately, Shahmehmud managed to recapture the city. For a while, the two brothers jointly administered Baghdad, but due to his brother's unreliability, Amir Isfahan was sent north to Dujayl. Despite Shahmohammed's willingness to share power with his brother, his son Shahali didn't accept it. In 1432, without his father's permission, Shahali attacked Amir Isfahan and failed. Eventually, in 1432-1433, Amir Isfahan ousted Shahmohammed from Baghdad, ending his rule over the city.

Shahmohammed's final days or months are not well-documented. According to Ghiyasi, he tried to regroup his army around Baghdad but, after failing, crossed the western shores of the Euphrates River by ship. He visited the tomb of the seventh Imam, Musa al-Kadhim, with his son Shahbudag and a servant, and received animals from Seyid Javaski before heading to Dujayl and then to Haditha. After gathering a certain army, he reconquered Mosul and Erbil and focused his attention on Baghdad. He seized or looted Baku-Beni but failed to take Baghdad, despite Amir Isfahan being ill. Ultimately, Amir Isfahan attacked him and forced him away from Baghdad. According to Ghiyasi, while Shahmohammed and his company were trying to capture a fort named Shekan, they were killed. According to Muhaddis̲'s writing, after his son Shahali fled to Qara Iskandar, Shahmohammed was killed by Baba Haji Hamedani. Hamedani was the Sultan of Gaverud.

==== Later action ====
After the death of Qara Iskandar in 1435, some of his sons and daughters took refuge with their uncle Amir Isfahan. Among them were his sons Elvend, Malik-Qasim, Asad, Rustam, Terkhan, Malik-Mahammad, and daughters Arayish, Shahsaray. That year, Shahmohammed's son Shahali turned away from his uncle and sought refuge with Shahrukh.

Amir Isfahan aimed to expand his borders leveraging the internal conflicts within the Aq Qoyunlu. In the summer of 1437, Hemze Bayandur defeated the Bey of Isfahan. He assembled a large army and forced the Qara Qoyunlu forces out of Diyar-i Rabia and Northern Mesopotamia.

On March 8, 1445, Amir Isfahan passed away. Nobles settled Isfahan Mirza into power as the Amir Fulad Mirza. When the news reached Jahan Shah, the ruler of the neighboring Qara Qoyunlu Empire, he moved with a sizable army from Azerbaijan towards Baghdad. By 1446, all independent forces remaining in Iraq from the time of Amir Isfahan were brought under the central authority in Tabriz.

== Sources ==
- Faruk Sümer, Kara Koyunlular (Başlangıçtan Cihan-Şah’a kadar) ("The Black Sheep, from the Beginning to Cihan-Shah", Volume I (Ankara: Turkish Historical Society Printing House, 1967)
- Hasan beg Rumlu - Aḥsan at-tawārīḫ (in Azerbaijani) Kastamonu: Uzanlar, 2017 ISBN 9786050306415
- Jackson, Peter (2014). Jalayerids. Encyclopedia Iranica Vol. XIV, Fasc. 4. pp. 415–419.
