= Qara Qoyunlu =

Persianate, Muslim Turkoman confederation (1374–1468)

Qara Qoyunlu قره قویونلو
- 1374–1468
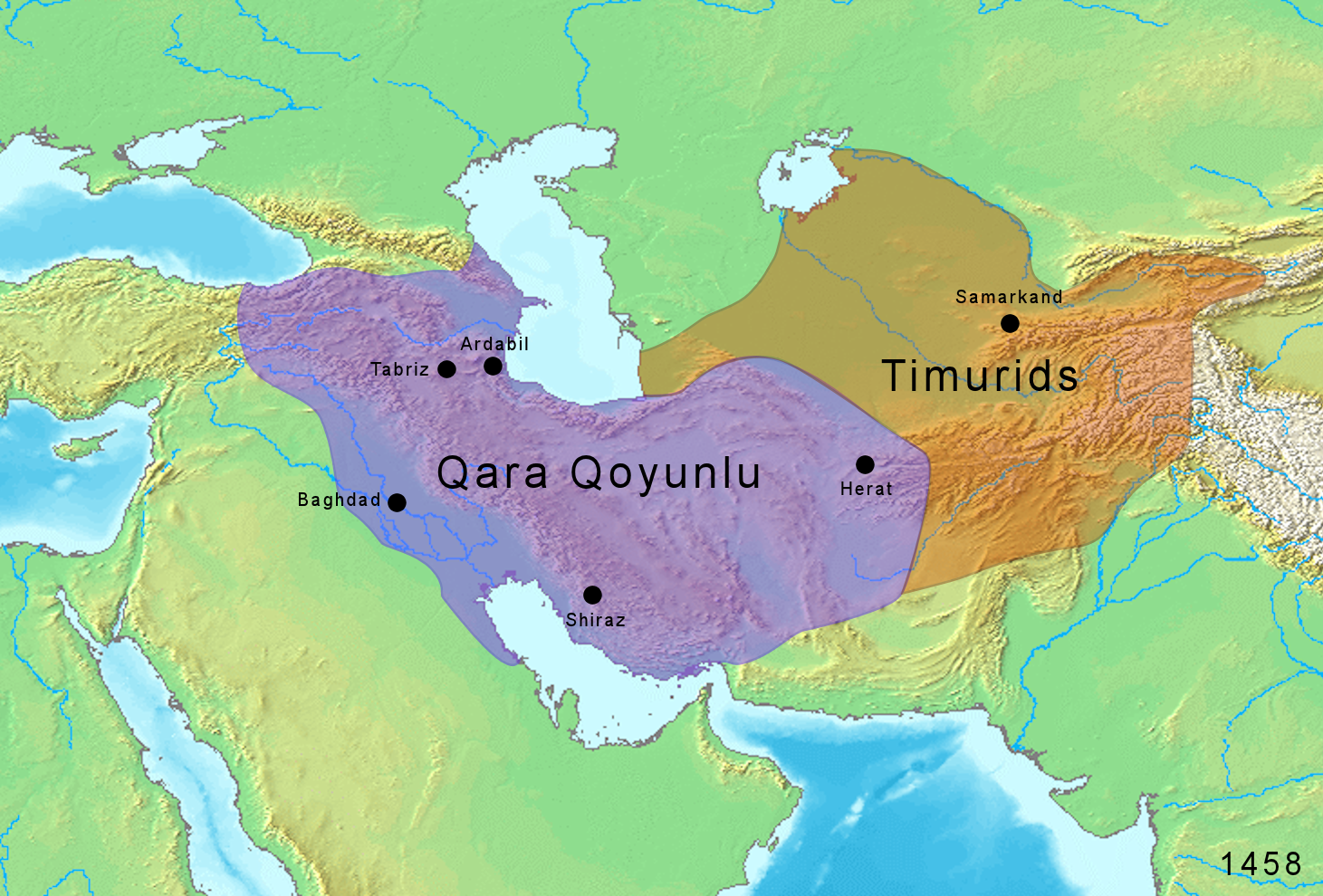
- Maximum extent of Qara Qoyunlu territory in 1458 under Jahan Shah, next to the Timurids
- Status: Confederate sultanate
- Capital: Erciş (summer pastures); Mosul (winter pastures); Tabriz
- Common languages: Persian (official court language, poetry); Azerbaijani (dynastic, army, poetry) (Note: "It is somewhat astonishing that a sturdy Turkman like Jihan-shah should have been so restricted in his ways of expression. Altogether the language of the poems belongs to the group of the southern Turkman dialects which go by the name of 'Azarbayjan Turkish'."); Arabic
- Religion: Islam (branch disputed)
- Government: Monarchy
- Ruler
  - 1374–1378: Bayram Khwaja (first)
  - 1467–1468: Hasan Ali (last)
- Historical era: Middle Ages
  - Established: 1374
  - Disestablished: 1468

Area
  - Total: 520.000 km^{2} (200.773 sq mi)
- Currency: Tanka
Preceded by
Jalayirids
Sutayids
Timurids
Succeeded by
Aq Qoyunlu

The Qara Qoyunlu or Kara Koyunlu (Azerbaijani: Qaraqoyunlular, قاراقویونلولار; Persian: قره قویونلو), also known as the Black Sheep Turkomans, were a Turkoman, culturally Persianate, Muslim dynasty that ruled over the territory comprising present-day Azerbaijan, Armenia, northwestern Iran, eastern Turkey, and northeastern Iraq from about 1374 to 1468.

== History ==
=== Etymology ===
The name Qara Qoyunlu literally means "[those with] black sheep". They were likely so named because of the black sheep that was painted on their flags. It has been suggested that this name refers to old totemic symbols, but according to Rashid al-Din Hamadani, the Turks were forbidden to eat the flesh of their totem-animals, and so this is unlikely given the importance of mutton in the diet of pastoral nomads. Another hypothesis is that the name refers to the predominant color of their flocks.

=== Origins ===
The ruling family descended from the Yıwa tribe of the Oghuz Turks, specifically the Baharlu, who by the fourteenth century possessed territories north of Lake Van and Mosul in Upper Mesopotamia. The tribes that comprised the Qara Qoyunlu besides the Baharlu were the Saadlu in what is now Nakhchivan Autonomous Republic, the Karamanlu in Ganja and Barda, the Alpaut and the Agacheri in Maraş, the Dukharlu in Erzurum and Bayburt, the Jagirlu in Ardabil, and the Hajilu. According to Faruk Sümer, the Qara Qoyunlu were undoubtedly a sub-tribe (oba "camp, tribe") of the Oghuz, and Vladimir Minorsky's claim that this subtribe belonged to the Yiwa is probably true.

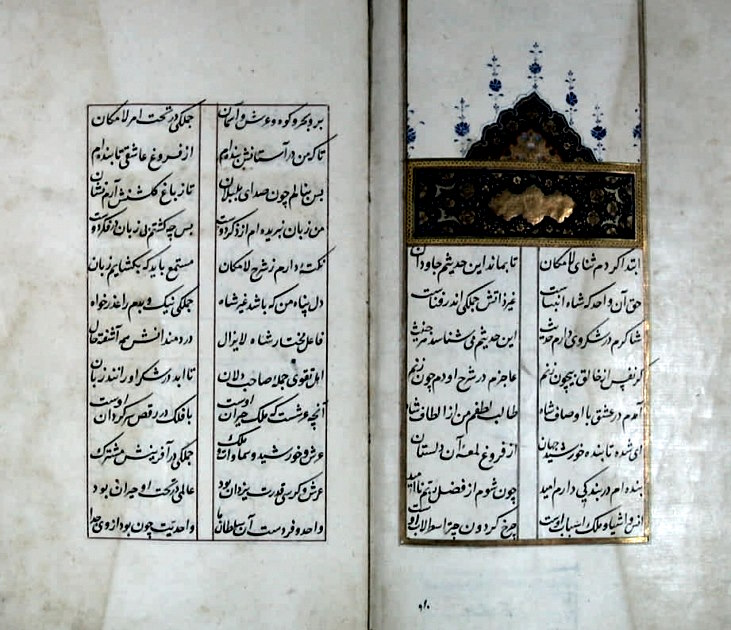
Manuscript of Azerbaijani poetry of the Qara Qoyunlu ruler Jahan Shah

By a number of researchers, the Oghuz dialect of Qara-Qoyunlu is connected with the Azerbaijani language. So, for example, Faruk Sumer noted that the East Oghuz dialect, which was spoken by Qara-Qoyunlu, is today called the Azerbaijani dialect. Serdar Gündoğdu and Ali İçeri (Serdar Gundogdu and Ali Icher) call the Azerbaijani language a legacy that came from the Turkoman tribes of Qara-Qoyunlu. Sultan Qara-Qoyunlu in 1435-1467 Jahan Shah is a recognized representative of Azerbaijani poetry.

Duharlu Turkmens, a branch of the Qara Qoyunlu, first appeared in the Chronicle of Michael Panaretos of the rump state of the Empire of Trebizond. It is probable that the Duharlu came to Anatolia from Central Asia during the Mongol conquest of Anatolia, as testified by the legendary traditions of the Qara Qoyunlu.

=== Rise ===
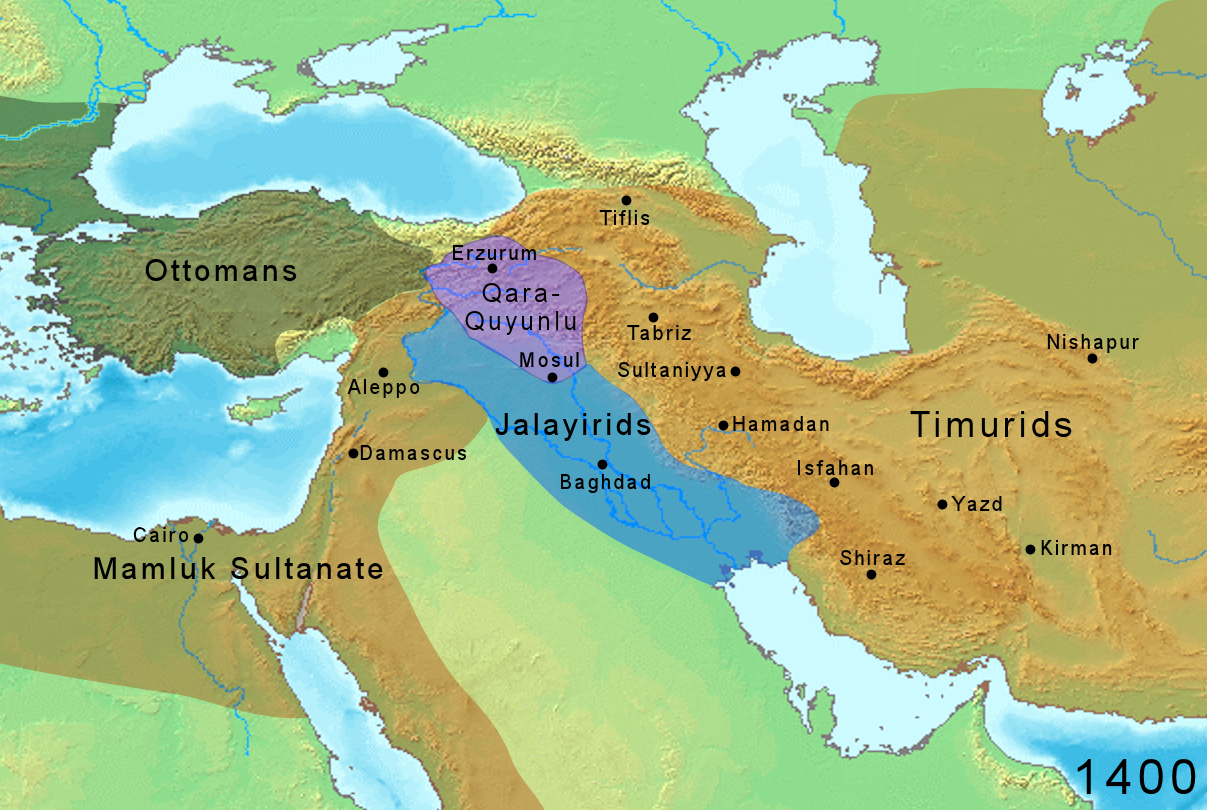
Original territory of the Qara Qoyunlus circa 1400 ( )

During the 14th century, the Qara Qoyunlu had several encounters with the powerful Jalayirid Sultanate, which was based in Baghdad and Tabriz. In 1366, Shaykh Uways Jalayir marched against the Qara Qoyunlu, defeating their leader Birdi Khwaja in Mosul and his brother Bayram Khwaja, at the battle of Mush. The Qara Qoyunlu Turkomans then became vassals of the Jalayirid Sultanate from about 1375, and the leader of their leading tribe ruled from Mosul. The Qara Qoyunlu ruler Qara Mahammad invaded Mardin in 1384 and received the submission of its Artuqid ruler Majd al-Din Isa Al-Zahir (1376-1407), who became a vassal.

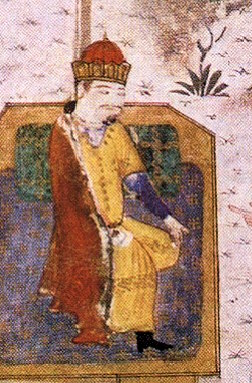
Qara Yusuf enthroned, Tarikh-i Turkmaniyah, 16th century

In 1400, the Timurid Empire under Timur defeated the Qara Qoyunlu, and Qara Yusuf fled to Egypt, seeking refuge with the Mamluk Sultanate. Qara Yusuf was welcomed by Sheikh Mahmud, the nāʾib of Damascus. Not long after, the Jalayirid sultan Ahmad Jalayir also came to Damascus. Not wanting to worsen relations with Timur, An-Nasir Faraj agreed to capture Qara Yusuf and Ahmad Jalayir and hand them over to him. Together in prison, the two leaders renewed their friendship, making an agreement that Ahmad Jalayir should keep Baghdad while Qara Yusuf would have Azerbaijan. Ahmad also adopted Qara Yusuf's son Pirbudag.

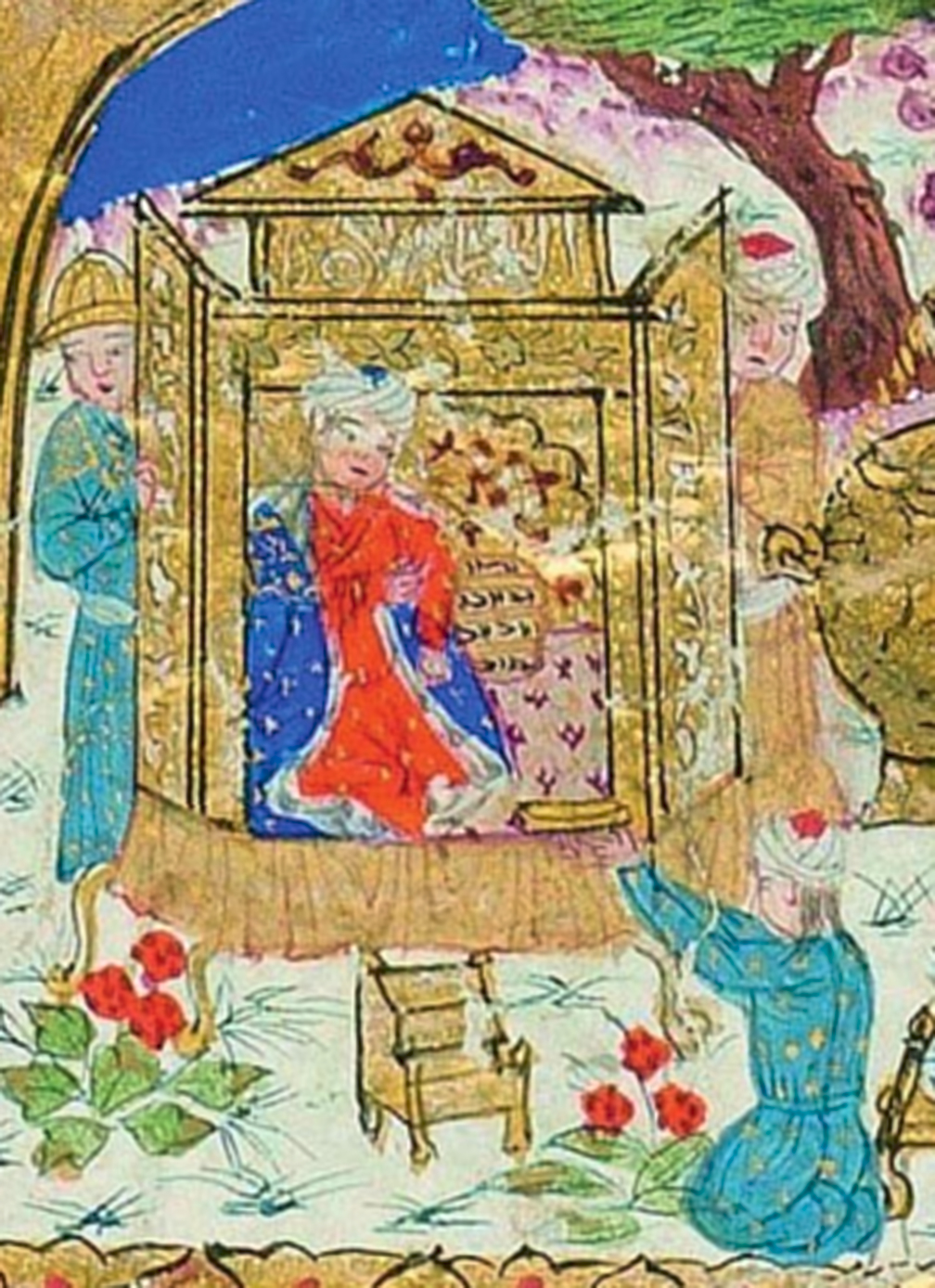
Likely contemporary depiction of Pirbudag, son of Qara Yusuf, and first ruler of the Qara Qoyunlus as an independent Sultanate. The Monastery, 1407-08 (Topkapı Palace Museum, TSMK H.2153, f.131b).

When Timur died in 1405, an-Nasir Faraj released them both. However, according to Faruk Sümer, they were released on the orders of rebellious wali of Damascus, Sheykh Mahmud.

Qara Yusuf, having returned from exile, forced Timur's governor of Van, Izzaddin Shir, to submit, while capturing Altamış, another viceroy set up by Timur, and sending him to Barquq. He later moved on to the territories of Azerbaijan. He defeated the Timurid Abu Bakr at the Battle of Nakhchivan on 14 October 1406 and reoccupied Tabriz. Abu Bakr and his father Miran Shah tried to recapture Azerbaijan, but on 20 April 1408, Qara Yusuf inflicted a decisive defeat on them at the Battle of Sardrud in which Miran Shah was killed. In the fall of 1409, Qara Yusuf entered Tabriz and sent a raiding party to Shirvan, especially Shaki, which was fruitless. In the west, Mardin, the last stronghold of the Artuqids, was taken over by the Qara Qoyunlu in 1409. The Qara Qoyunlu finally secured their independence from the Jalayarid dynasty with the conquest of Tabriz by Qara Yusuf and the execution of Shaykh Uways Jalayir in 1410.

=== Armenia and Georgia (1410) ===
In 1410, Armenia fell under the control of the Qara Qoyunlu. The principal Armenian sources available in this period come from the historian Tovma Metsopetsi and several colophons to contemporary manuscripts. According to Tovma, although the Qara Qoyunlu levied heavy taxes against the Armenians, the early years of their rule were relatively peaceful and some reconstruction of towns took place. This peaceful period was, however, shattered with the rise of Qara Iskander, who reportedly made Armenia a "desert" and subjected it to "devastation and plunder, to slaughter, and captivity". Iskander's wars with and eventual defeat by the Timurids invited further destruction in Armenia, as many Armenians were taken captive and sold into slavery and the land was subjected to outright pillaging, forcing many of them to leave the region. Iskander did attempt to reconcile with the Armenians by appointing an Armenian from a noble family, Rustum, as one of his advisers.

When the Timurids launched their final incursion into the region, they convinced Jihanshah, Iskander's brother, to turn on his brother. Jahanshah pursued a policy of persecution against the Armenians in Syunik and colophons to Armenian manuscripts record the sacking of the Tatev monastery by his forces. But he, too, sought a rapprochement with the Armenians, allotting land to feudal lords, rebuilding churches, and approving the relocation of the seat of the Armenian Apostolic Church's Catholicos to Etchmiadzin Cathedral in 1441. For all this, Jihanshah continued to attack Armenian towns and take Armenian captives as the country saw further devastation in the final years of Jihanshah's failed struggles with the Aq Qoyunlu.

During the reign of the Georgian king Alexander I of Georgia (r. 1412–1442), the Qara Qoyunlu multiplied raids against the Kingdom of Georgia, such as the raids led by Qara Yusuf in Akhaltsikhe in 1416. They started the Turkoman invasions of Georgia (1407–1502), ultimately participating to the collapse of the Georgian realm.

=== Baghdad ===
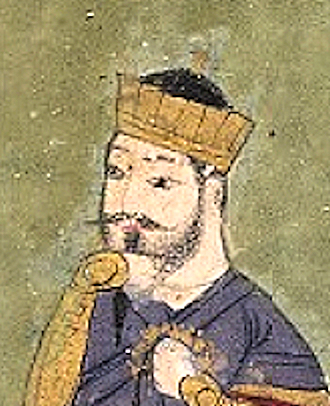
Contemporary portrait of Qara Iskander, circa 1430

In 1410, the Qara Qoyunlu captured Baghdad. The installation of a subsidiary Qara Qoyunlu line hastened the downfall of the Jalairids they had once served. The Qara Qoyunlu finally took down the Jalayirid Sultanate, which fled in a diminished form to southern Iran. The illustrated manuscript Basatin al-uns (TSMK Ms. R. 1032) seems to have been created at the juncture of these events, and may be one of the last manuscripts created by the Jalayirids in Baghdad.

Qara Yusif died in 1420, leading to internal fighting among Qara Yusuf's descendants. After the death of Qara Yusuf in December 1420, Shah Rukh tried to take Azerbaijan from Qara Yusuf's son Iskander, using the fact that none of his sons was accompanying his father. Shah Rukh defeated Qara Iskander in 1420–21. The Timurids briefly occupied the Qara Qoyunlu capital of Tabriz in 1421, and Baysunghur, the son of Shah Rukh, brought back to Herat a group of Tabrizi artists and calligraphers, formerly working for Ahmad Jalayir, who he installed in Herat to add to his existing artists from Shiraz. They became the most important school of artists in Iran, merging the two styles. Shah Rukh again defeated Qara Iskander in 1429, only in the third expedition of Shahrukh Mirza in 1434–35 did the Timurids succeed, upon which Shah Rukh entrusted the government to Iskander's own brother, Jahan Shah (1436-1467) as his vassal.

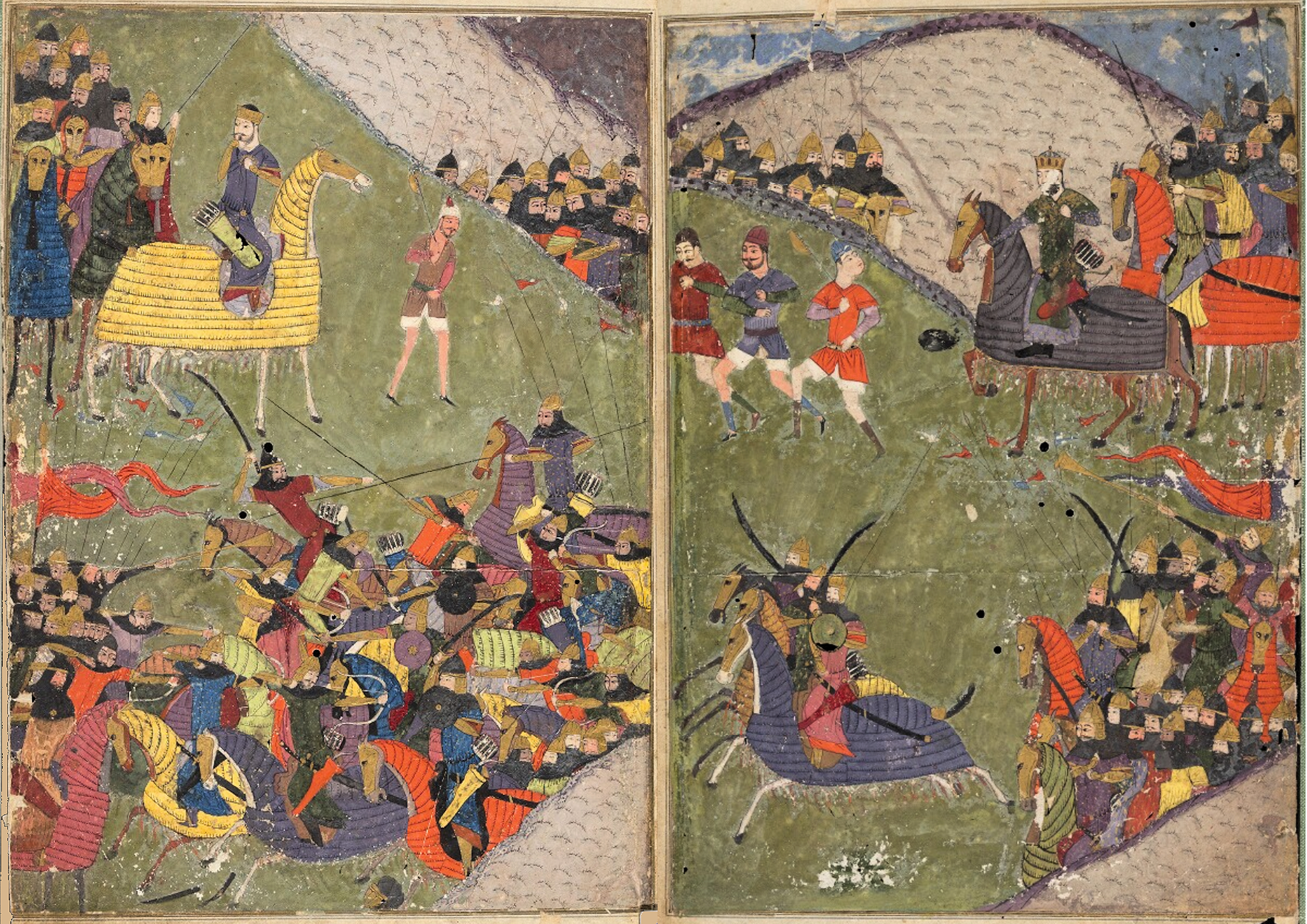
Contemporary depiction of Qara Qoyunlu ruler Qara Iskander (left) in battle against the Timurid Ibrahim Sultan (right) in April 1429. Shahnama (1430), Bodleian Library, ms. Add 176, folios 6r-7v.

In 1436 Jahan Shah made peace with the Timurid Shahrukh Mirza, and obtained the help of Shah Rukh to defeat Iskander and seize the throne for himself. He was also adopted by Gawhar Shad and crowned on 19 April 1438, taking the epithet Muzaffar al-Din. Upon the death of the Timurid ruler Shah Rukh in 1447, Jahan Shah became an independent ruler of the Qara Qoyunlu, and started to use the titles of sultan and khan. At the same time, the Timurid Empire took advantage of the struggles among the Turkoman princes and captured the cities of Sultaniya and Qazvin. Peace was made when Sultan Muhammad bin Baysonqor was married to a daughter of Jahan Shah. However, he retook lands he lost from Mirza Babur.

After the death of Shahrukh in 1447, the Qara Qoyunlu Turkomans annexed portions of Iraq and the eastern coast of the Arabian Peninsula as well as Timurid-controlled western Iran. As the Timurid Empire was embroiled in uncertainty and succession struggles, Jahan Shah managed to capture the cities of Sultaniya, Hamadan and Qazvin.

=== Southern and Eastern expansion ===
In 1452-1453, Jahan Shah seized the opportunity of the death of Sultan Muhammad bin Baysonqor, Timurid Governor of Fars, to further expand East and South, taking Saveh, Qum, Isfahan, Shiraz and Yazd. He was seconded by his son Pīr Būdāq, who became governor of the region of Shiraz.

In the summer of 1458, Jahan Shah advanced as far as Herat and occupied the city for a few months, but ultimately had to turn back because of a revolt by his son Hasan Ali, and also because of Abu Said's march on Tabriz.

Hasan Ali was kept in Maku prison for a while for his rebellious nature. He was defeated in winter 1458. But this time, his son Pirbudag rebelled, who was soon joined by Hasan Ali in Fars. However, he was spared at the request of his mother and replaced by Mirza Yusuf, another son of Jahan Shah. Pirbudag was sent to govern Baghdad, his other sons Qasim beg was assigned to Kerman with Hasan Ali being imprisoned again. However, Pirbudag again rebelled, now controlling Baghdad. He was defeated in 1464 and was executed by Mirza Muhammad.

=== Decline ===
Though much territory was gained during his rule, Jahān Shāh's reign was troubled by his rebellious sons and the almost autonomous rulers of Baghdad, whom he expelled in 1464. In 1466, Jahan Shah attempt to take Diyarbakır from the Aq Qoyunlu ("White Sheep Turkomans") ended in a catastrophic failure, which resulted in Jahān Shāh's death in the Battle of Chapakchur in 1467 and the collapse of the Qara Qoyunlu control in the Middle East. This time Hasanali Mirza came to power, but was killed by Uzun Hasan. By 1468, at their height under Uzun Hasan (1452–1478), the Aq Qoyunlu defeated the Qara Qoyunlu and conquered Iraq, Azerbaijan, and western Iran.

== Religion ==
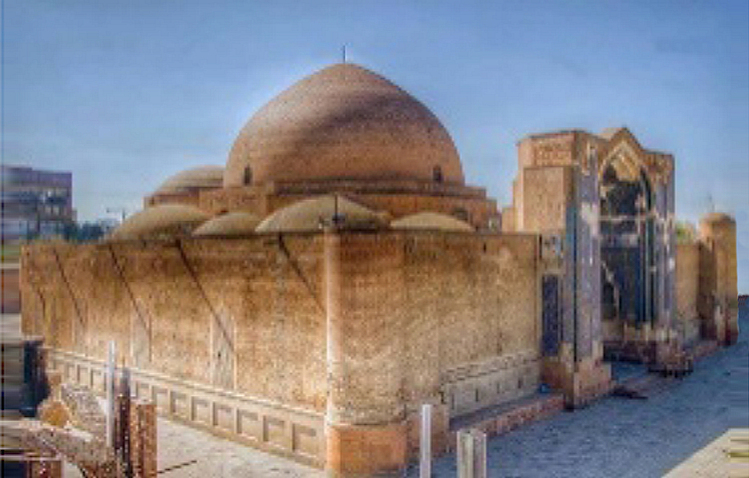
The Blue Mosque, Tabriz was started in 870 AH (1465/1466 CE) through a foundation established by the wife of Jahan Shah, and was completed in October 1465.

During the Qara Qoyunlu period, Shia Islam was being spread, notably through the activities of Shaykh Junayd of the Safavid order in Azerbaijan and Anatolia and the Musha'sha' in Khuzistan. Vladimir Minorsky writes that the Qara Qoyunlu adopted Shia Islam as a unifying ideology for their loose tribal confederation, and that "in trying to unify their adepts on a shīʿa platform, they can be regarded as the forerunners of the Safavids." Their rivals, the Aq Qoyunlu, probably rejected heterodox religious influences out of their enmity towards the Qara Qoyunlu. According to R. Quiring-Zoche, however, it is "doubtful" that there was a definite contrast between the Shia Islam of the Qara Qoyunlu and the Sunni Islam of the Aq Qoyunlu. Some later members of the ruling family had names typical of Shia Muslims, and some rulers minted coins with Shia legends. However, the rulers Qara Yusuf, Iskander and Jihanshah minted coins with the names of the four caliphs (three of whom are rejected by Shia Muslims). C. E. Bosworth writes, "there seems no strong evidence for definite Shi'i sympathies among many Turkmen elements of the time." Additionally, there is no indication in contemporary Aq Qoyunlu, Mamluk and Timurid sources that the Qara Qoyunlu rulers had Shia inclinations.

== Governance ==
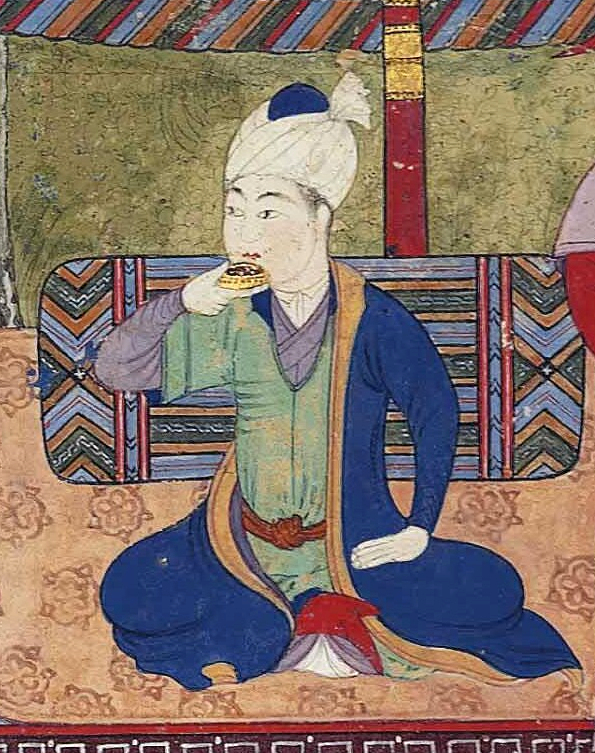
Contemporary depiction of Pir Budaq, son of Jahan Shah, as Governor of Shiraz. Shiraz miniature, c. 1455–1460

The Qara Qoyunlu state organization was based mainly on of its predecessors, Jalayirids, and the Ilkhanids. Qara Qoyunlu rulers used the title sultan since the enthronement of Pirbudag by Qara Yusuf. Sometimes the title bahadur appeared on the coinage. They also used the titles khan, khagan and padishah.

Keeping with a Persianate culture, the Qara Qoyunlu used the Persian language for diplomacy, poetry, and as a court language. Diplomatic letters to the Timurids and Ottomans were written in Persian, while the correspondence with the Mamluk sultans were in Arabic. Official internal documents (farmān, suyūrghāl) were also written in Persian. Jahan Shah was titled Padishah-i Iran and King of Kings of Iran during his reign.

As for the provincial organization, the provinces were governed by şehzade and beys, who had smaller divans in each of the provinces. The governance by military governors (beys) generally passed on from father to son. In the cities there were officials called darugha, that looked after financial and administrative affairs, and also had political powers. The şehzades and beys had their own soldiers which were called nökers, who were trained and salaried.

In the south, Pir Budaq, son of Jahan Shah became Governor of the region of Shiraz, becoming to some extent a ruler in his own right, rebelling against his father by seeking independence. This move aroused his father's anger. Pir Budaq was later transferred to the governorship of Baghdad, thought to be easier to control than Shiraz, but he was ultimately killed upon the orders of his father.

== Culture ==
Under Timur, the cultural entity of Iran was renewed by Persian literature, art and culture being patronized throughout the Timurid Empire. Consequently, Qara Qoyunlu art was notably influenced by the Timurids. Jahan Shah wrote his poetry in Azerbaijani and Persian, while the Kitab-i Diyarbakriyya, a history of the Qara Qoyunlu and Aq Qoyunlu, was written by Abu Bakr Tehrani in Persian. The rule of the Qara Qoyunlu and other Turkoman dynasties speeded up the process—well underway by that time—by which Azerbaijan and parts of Fars became ethnically and linguistically Turkic.

=== Architecture ===
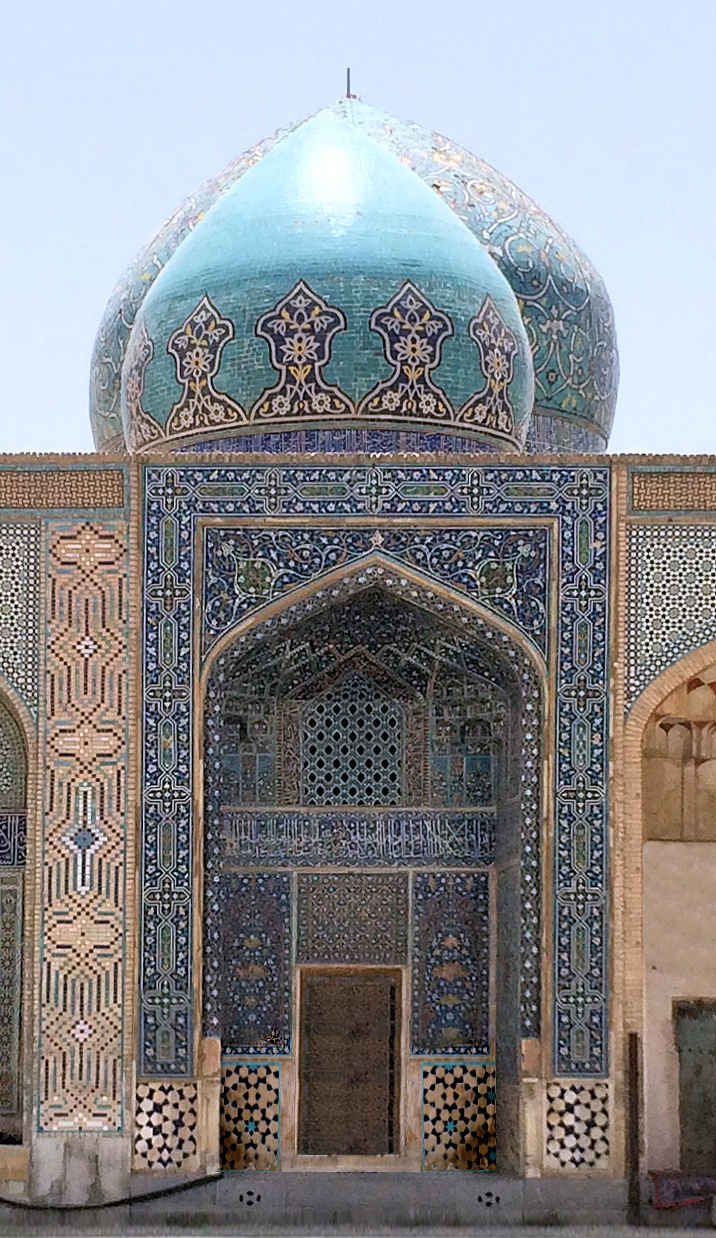
Northern iwan of Darb-e Imam, Isfahan, 1453. The small greenish dome is a later Safavid addition

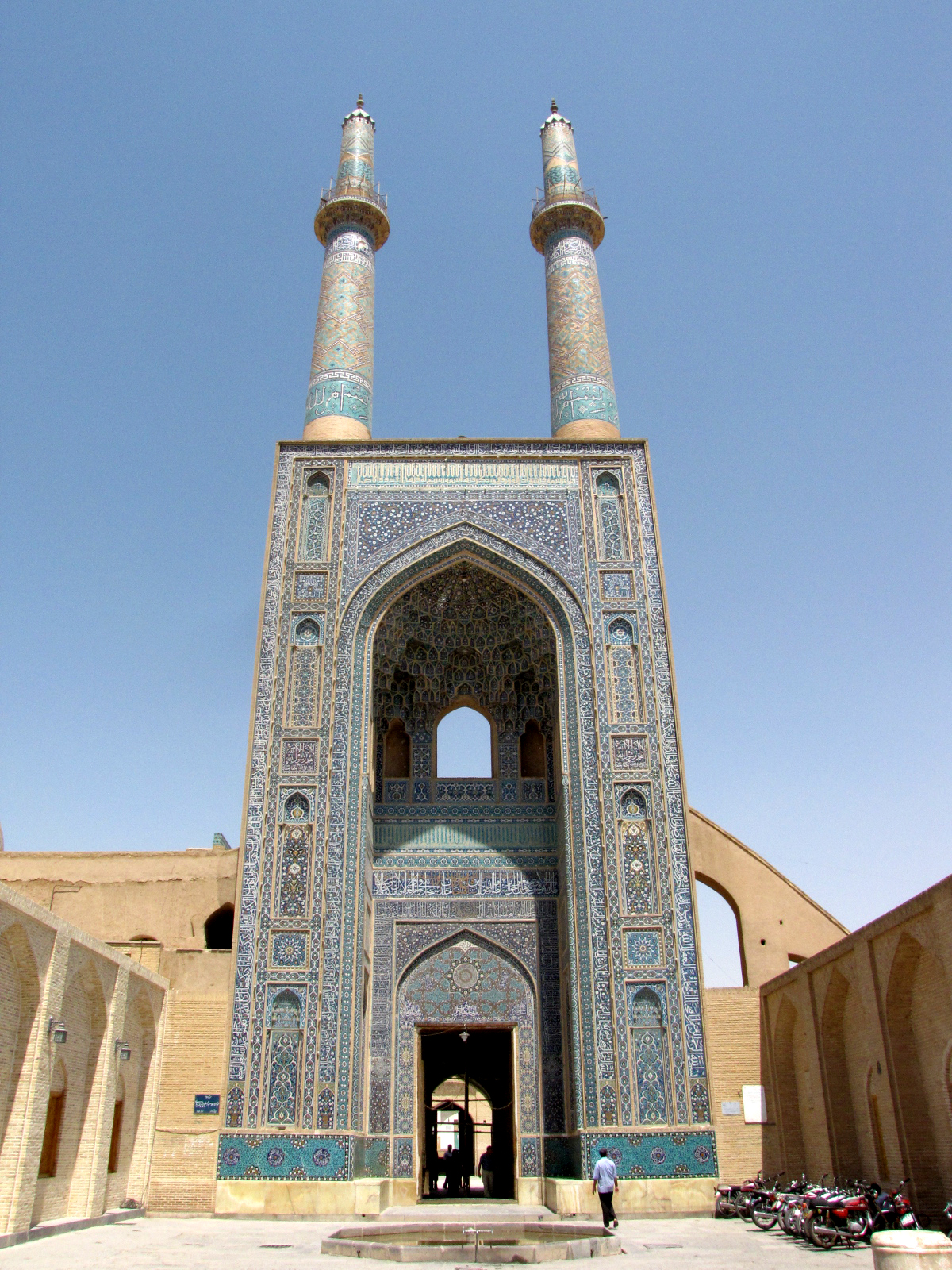
Eastern iwan of the Jameh Mosque of Yazd, renovated by Jahan Shah in 1457

Jahan Shah is known for several architectural contributions through western Iran. The Northern Iwan of Darb-e Imam in Isfahan is attributed to him. He commissioned and dedicated the monument in 1453, two years after conquering the city. The gate is considered as "a masterpiece of tile decoration", and "among the finest specimens of such work in Persia". It has a monumental inscription in Persian recording the rule of Jahanshah and the local governorship of his son Moḥammad: "When the ruler of the greatest domain, lord of the mightiest realm, and sovereign protector of the world Abu’l-Moẓaffar Mīrzāda Jahānšāh, may God perpetuate his stewardship, entrusted the government of this province to the care and direction of the prince, the support of the pillars of the religion of Moḥammad Abu’l-Fatḥ Moḥammadī...".

Jahanshah is also known for renovation work on the Eastern entrance iwan of the Jameh Mosque of Yazd in 1457. The portal has a central dedication in the name of Jahanshah: "the structure of this lofty arch (taf) was restored during the reign of . . . Abu’l-Muzaffar Sultan Jahanshah, Nizam al Dawlah wa’l-Din al-Hajj Qanbar, in Dhu’l-Hijjah 861." It is thought that the contribution was specifically related to the muqarnas of the portal.

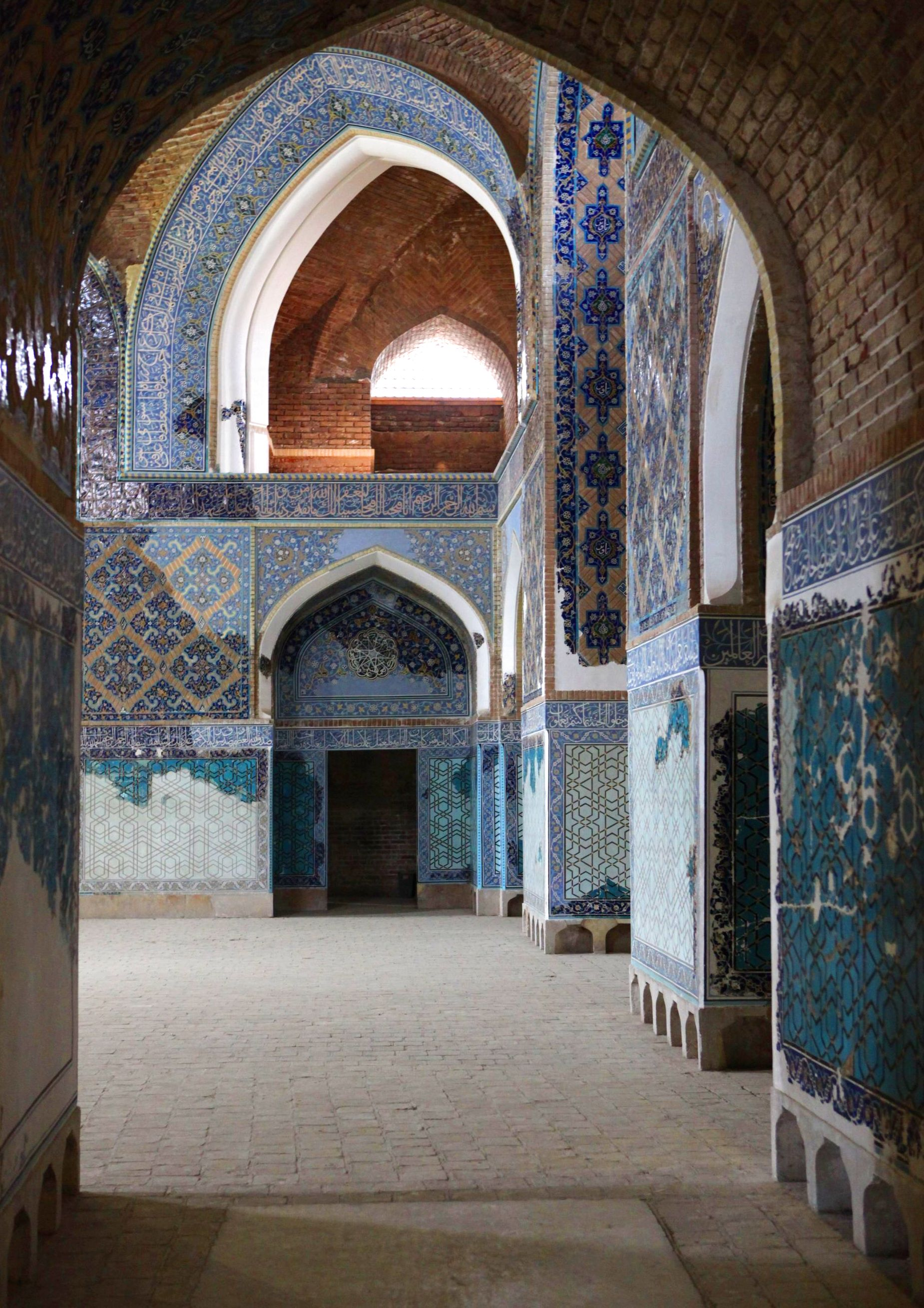
Restored interior of the Blue Mosque of Tabriz

The Blue Mosque in Tabriz was started through a foundation established by the wife of Jahanshah, and was completed in 1465. The construction of the mausoleum itself, forming an outgrowth to the south of the mosque, continued during the reign of the Āq Qoyunlu into the 1480s. The entrance gate also has a monumental inscription in the name of Jahan Shah.

==== Tilework ====
The celebrated tilework of the Blue Mosque consists in "unrivalled" underglaze painted tile and mosaics, using shades of cobalt blue and incized gold and white patterns, which covered both the interior and the exterior of the mosque, as well as its dome. Qara Qoyunlu architecture is often richly decorated, but the designs of the Blue Mosque are particularly innovative, and may have been influenced by architects from the Timurid capital of Herat having moved to Tabriz following the 1458 capture of Herat.

The Turkmen style of tilework appears to have been an influential precursor throughout the Middle-East. It is thought that the blue-and-white tiles which can be found in the architectural decorations of Mamluk Syria and Egypt, or in the Ottoman capitals of Bursa and Edirne, were created by itinerant artists coming from the Qara Qoyunlu and Aq Qoyunlu capital of Tabriz. The tilework of the Dome of the Rock in the Old City of Jerusalem was signed by "Abdallah of Tabriz" under a commission of the Ottoman Sultan Süleyman in 1545-1552. The influence of this Tabrizi school was also felt in Istanbul up to the mid-16th century.

=== Manuscript production ===
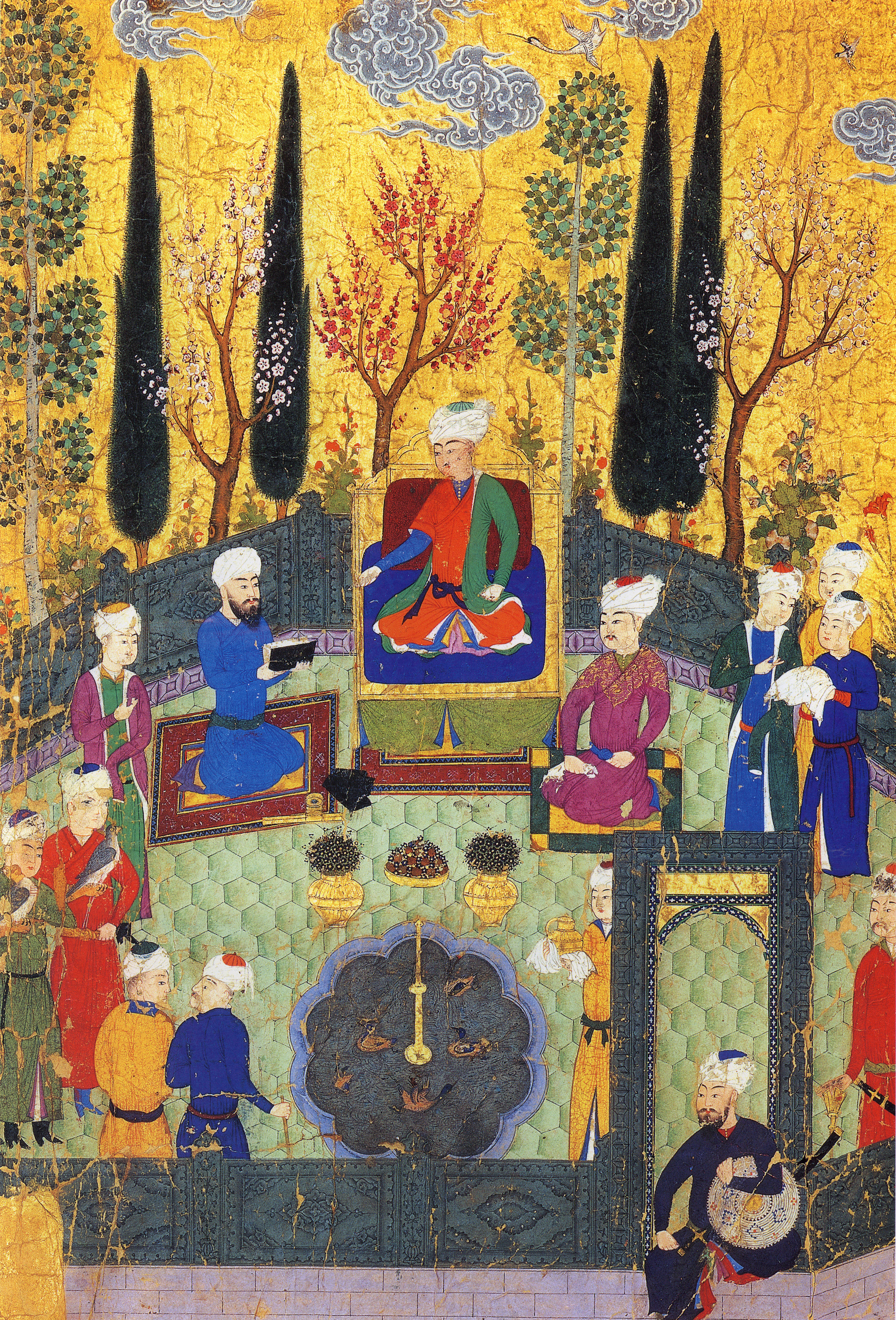
Pir Budaq and his court. Frontispiece from a Kalila wa Dimna, Baghdad (likely), c. 1465.

Jahan Shah's constant military struggles limited his involvement in artistic pursuits, apart from monumental architectural contributions such as the Blue Mosque in Tabriz. The beautiful tilework displayed in the decorations of the Blue Mosque can be considered as a precussor of the manuscript frontispieces later made in Herat. Many of the miniatures produced during the period tended to be somewhat "provincial" in taste, using bright colors and standardized figures, known as the "Turkmen style".

On the contrary, Jahan Shah's son Pir Budaq, who became Governor of Fars and Baghdad, was extremely active in the production of refined manuscripts. The fact that Pir Budaq had accompanied his father Jahan Shah during the several-months occupation of Timurid Herat in 1458, may have given him the opportunity to get acquainted to the Timurid "art of the book" and to Timurid court artists. Under Pir Budaq, several innovations were made in the calligrapgy of nasta'liq writing, and manuscripts were finely illustrated along Khorasan pictorial conventions.

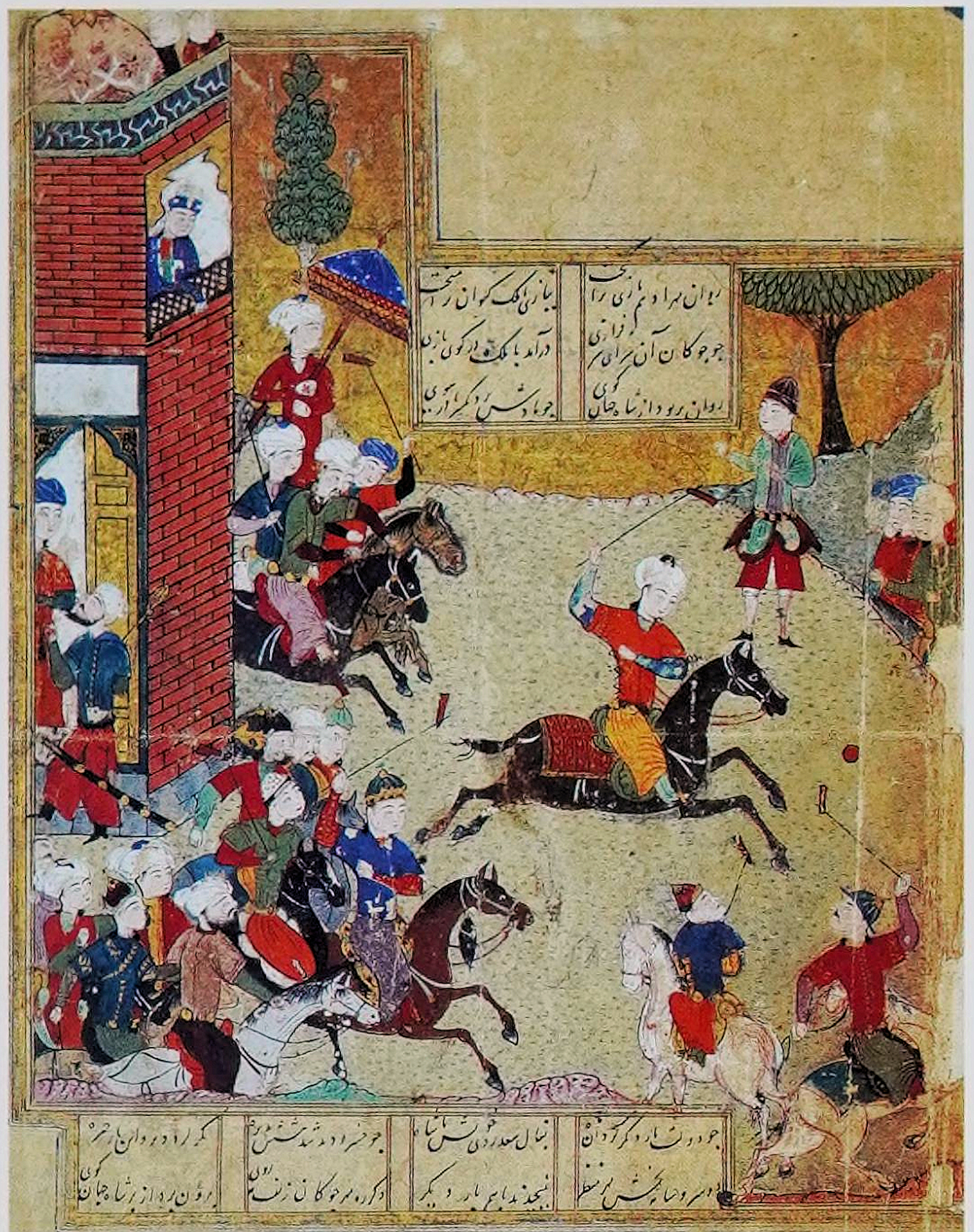
Mihr u Mushtari by Assar. Tabriz, 1420: earliest appearance of the "Turkmen style" under the Qara Qoyunlu.

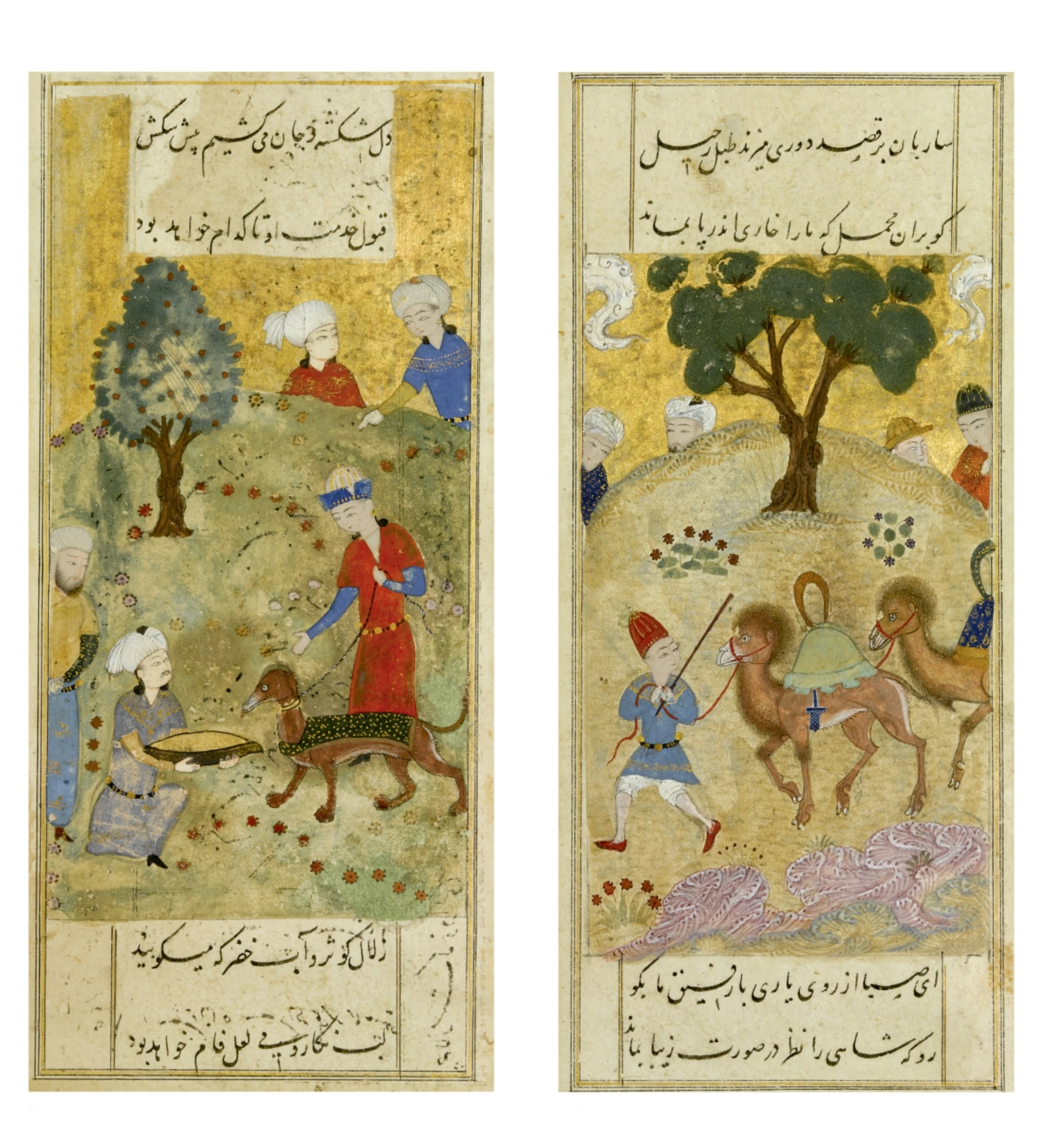
Two folios from a Persian manuscript, Persia, Qaraqoyunlu Turkmen, 1460-1480.

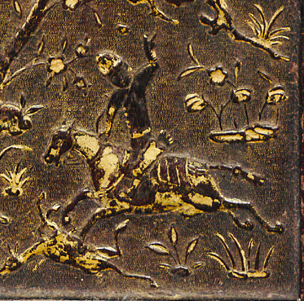
Qara Qoyunlu hunting scene. Upper binding cover, 1455, Baghdad, Dīwān-i Qāsim-i Anwar (TSMK, R. 991).

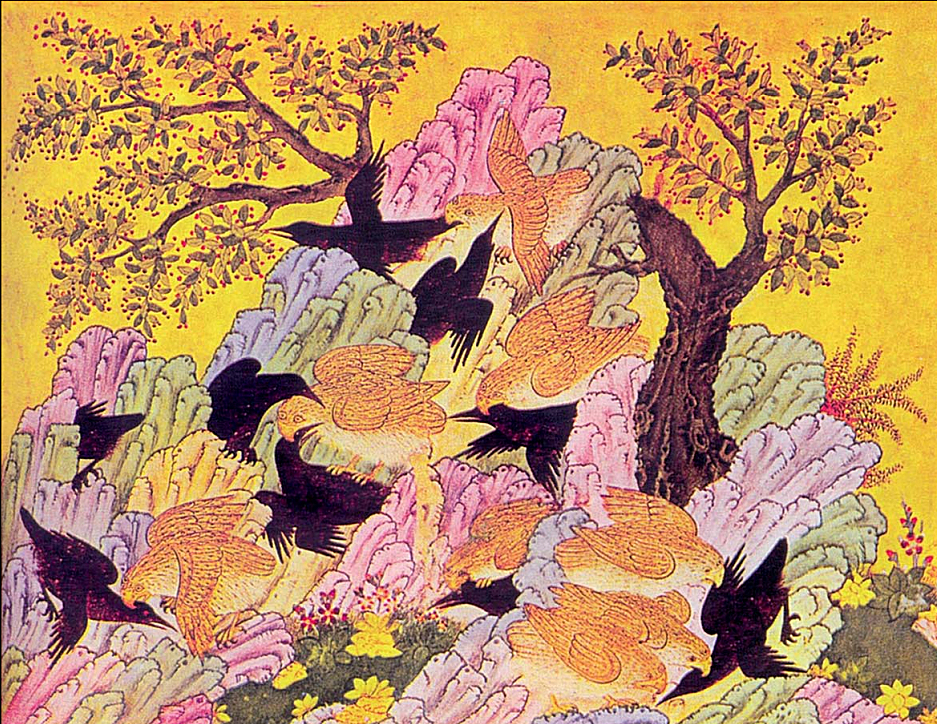
The battle of the crows and the owls. Kalila wa Dimna, for Pir Budak c. 1460

== Qara Qoyunlus in India ==
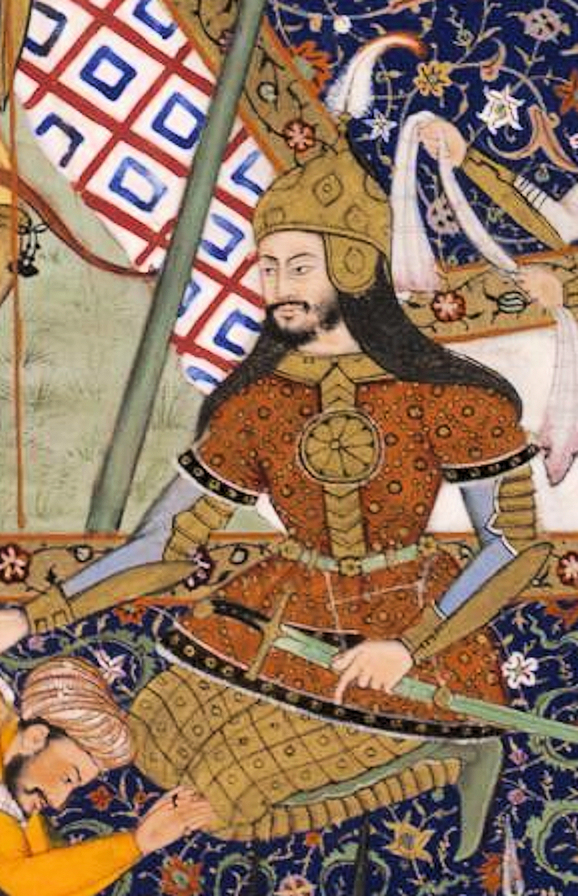
Husayn Quli Khan ("Khan Jahan"), Mughal Jagir of Ajmer in India, in 1563.

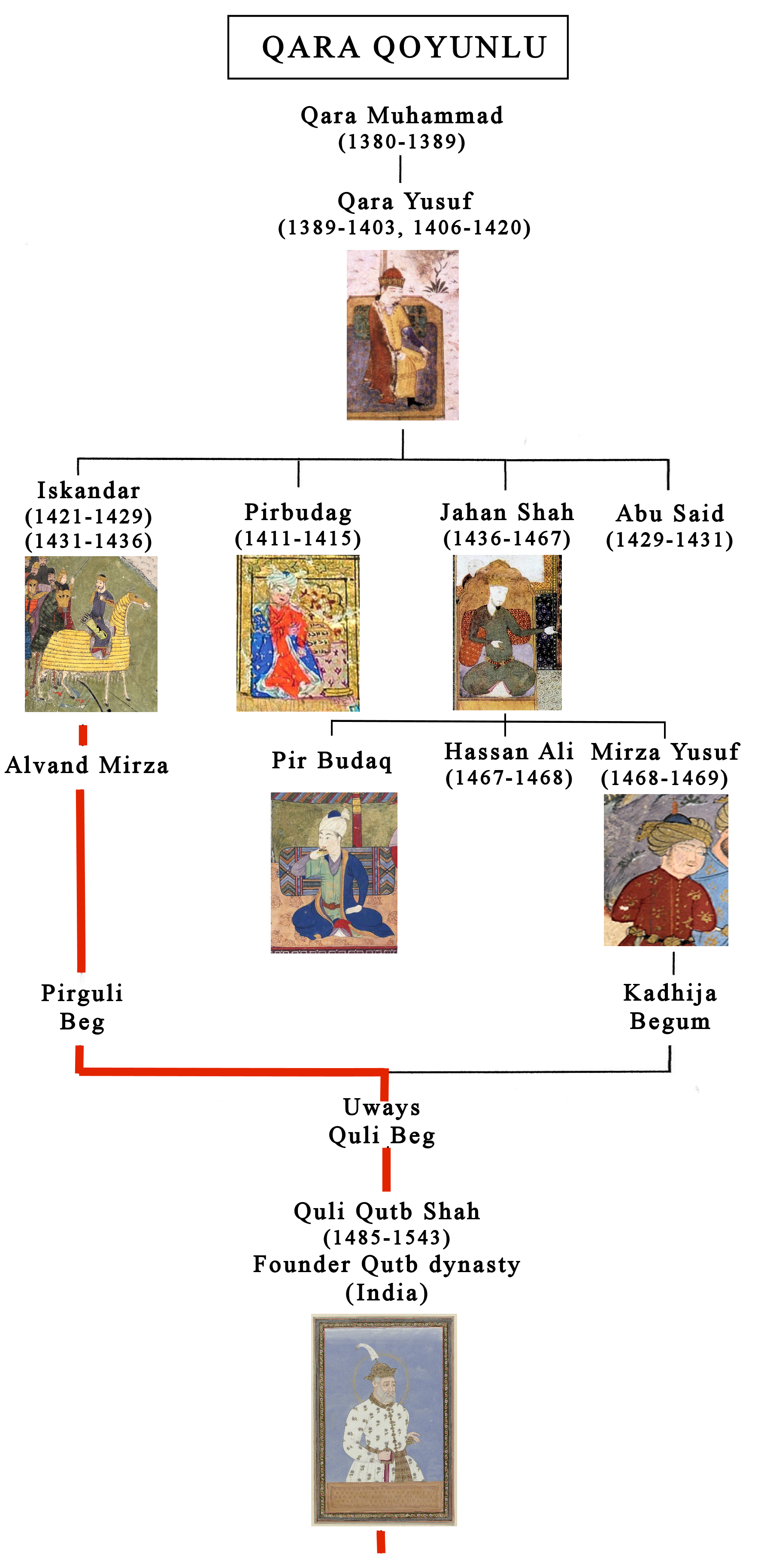
The Qara Qoyunlu and the Indian branch of the Qutbshahis.

Sultan Quli Khawas Khan Hamdani (r.1518-1543), the founder of the Qutb Shahi dynasty of the Sultanate of Golconda in southern India, belonged to the Qara Qoyunlu and was a fourth-generation direct descendant of Qara Iskander (r.1421-1436). In the 16th century, he migrated from Iran to Delhi with his uncle, Allah-Quli, some of his relatives and friends. Later he migrated south, to the Deccan and served the Bahmani sultan, Mahmood Shah Bahmani II, who was of Afghan Origin. He established and declared the independence of the Sultanate of Golconda after the disintegration of the Bahmani Sultanate into the five Deccan sultanates.

In the 16th century, other Qara Qoyunlus played a prominent role in the service of the Mughals in India, such as Bairam Khan (Bahārlū clan of the Qara Qoyunlū, Commander-in-chief of the Mughal army), his son Abdul Rahim Khan-i-Khanan, or his nephew Khan Jahan I.

== See also ==
- List of rulers of Qara Qoyunlu
- Turkmen incursions into Georgia
- Mausoleum of Turkmen emirs
- Qutb Shahis
