= Battle of Qarabagh =

1469 Aq Qoyunlu–Timurid conflict

Battle of Qarabagh (1469)
- Part of the Timurid–Aq Qoyunlu wars
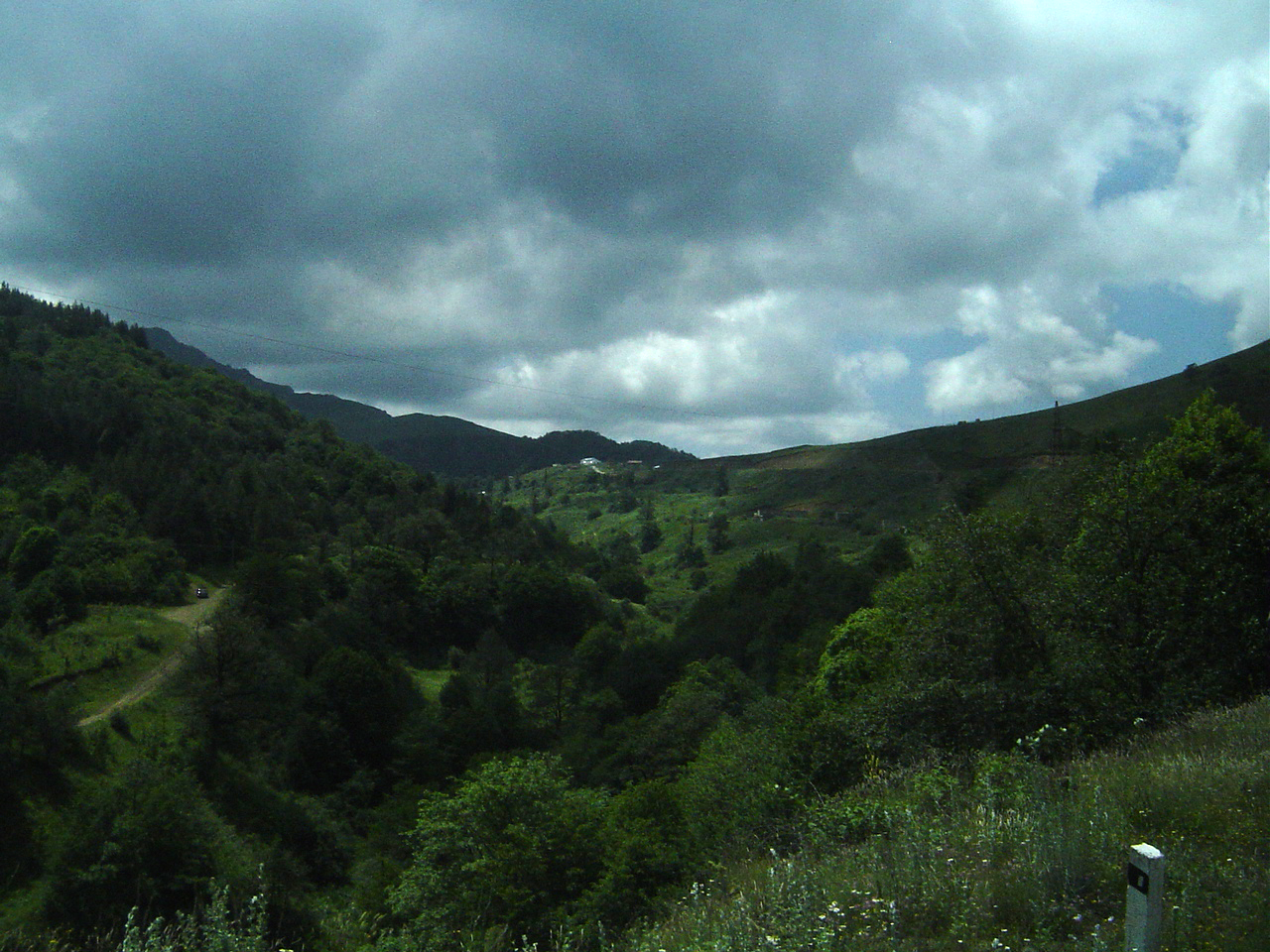
- The mountainous terrain of Qarabagh
Date	January – 4 February 1469 (Rajab 873 AH)
Location	Qarabagh and the Mughan plain (near Mahmudabad), Arran and Shirvan (present-day Azerbaijan)
Result	Decisive Aq Qoyunlu victory
Territorial changes	Aq Qoyunlu consolidates control over Azerbaijan and western Iran

Belligerents
Aq Qoyunlu; Shirvanshahs	Timurid Empire

Commanders and leaders
Uzun Hasan; Farrukh Yasar	(Timurid Empire) Abu Sa'id Mirza (POW)

The Battle of Qarabagh (also referred to in regional historiography as the Battle of Mahmudabad) was a decisive military engagement and winter blockade fought in January and early February 1469 (Rajab 873 AH) across Qarabagh and the adjacent Mughan plain. It pitted the Aq Qoyunlu confederation under Uzun Hasan, supported by the Shirvanshah Farrukh Yasar, against the invading army of the Timurid ruler Abu Sa'id Mirza.

Rather than risking a pitched battle against the larger Timurid host, Uzun Hasan severed Abu Sa'id's supply lines and persuaded Farrukh Yasar to abandon his alliance with the Timurids. Trapped in severe winter conditions without provisions near Mahmudabad in the Mughan steppe, the Timurid army disintegrated, leading to Abu Sa'id's capture on 4 February 1469 and subsequent execution. The defeat permanently ended Timurid attempts to recover western Iran and Iraq, leaving the Aq Qoyunlu as the dominant power in the region.

== Background ==
During the mid-15th century, the Qara Qoyunlu ruler Jahan Shah expanded his domain across Azerbaijan, central Iran, Iraq, and parts of eastern Anatolia, while nominally recognizing Timurid suzerainty. Exploiting internal Timurid succession struggles, Jahan Shah invaded Khurasan in the summer of 1458 and occupied Herat. However, internal unrest and the rising power of Uzun Hasan's Aq Qoyunlu confederation forced Jahan Shah to negotiate a settlement with the Timurid ruler Abu Sa'id Mirza in December 1458, restoring Khurasan, Mazandaran, and Jurjan to the Timurids while retaining Iraq-i Ajam and western Iran for himself.

In eastern Anatolia, Uzun Hasan consolidated control over Diyarbakir and defeated Jahan Shah decisively at the Battle of Chapakchur in October–November 1467, rapidly dismantling Qara Qoyunlu rule across Azerbaijan and western Iran. Uzun Hasan followed up his victory by defeating Jahan Shah's son, Hasan Ali, near Marand.

Hasan Ali fled to Khurasan and appealed for assistance from Abu Sa'id Mirza, who was stationed at Merv. Although Uzun Hasan sent envoys affirming his loyalty to the house of Timur, Abu Sa'id resolved to march west under the pretext of restoring Hasan Ali, aiming to reassert Timurid hegemony over western Iran. In Timurid historiography, notably in the memoirs of Abu Sa'id's grandson Babur, the ensuing campaign became known as the Disaster of Iraq-i Ajam.

== The battle ==
Abu Sa'id Mirza marched into Azerbaijan in 1468 with a large army, dispatching detachments toward Iraq-i Ajam and Fars while advancing with his main force toward Ardabil and Tabriz. Uzun Hasan repeatedly sent embassies seeking peace, but Abu Sa'id refused all terms short of personal submission.

As winter approached, Abu Sa'id moved his army toward Qarabagh and established his winter encampment near Mahmudabad in the eastern Mughan plain, near the Caspian Sea littoral and the southern border of Shirvan, relying on promised grain supplies and logistical support from the Shirvanshah Farrukh Yasar. As historian John E. Woods notes, Uzun Hasan avoided a direct confrontation with the numerically superior Timurid host, instead employing mobile harassment, scorched-earth tactics, and an economic blockade that severed Timurid communications with both Khurasan and Shirvan.

Simultaneously, Uzun Hasan opened negotiations with Farrukh Yasar and persuaded the Shirvanshah to defect from the Timurid coalition. Deprived of Shirvani provisions and exposed to harsh winter weather, Abu Sa'id's forces suffered acute famine, the loss of transport animals and cavalry mounts, and widespread desertions. According to Babur's account, the royal horses went without barley for fourteen days before the army's cohesion collapsed. By late January 1469, the Timurid position had become untenable, forcing Abu Sa'id to attempt a disorganized retreat. Aq Qoyunlu detachments pursued and routed the starving remnants of the Timurid army, capturing Abu Sa'id Mirza on 22 Rajab 873 AH (4 February 1469).

== Aftermath ==
Following his capture, Abu Sa'id was brought to Uzun Hasan's camp and handed over to Yadgar Muhammad Mirza, a Timurid prince and great-grandson of Shah Rukh, who had him executed several days later in February 1469 in retaliation for the earlier execution of Gawhar Shad. Later in 1469, Uzun Hasan proclaimed Yadgar Muhammad Mirza as Abu Sa'id's successor and supplied him with troops to challenge Sultan Husayn Bayqara in Khurasan.

Historians John E. Woods and Beatrice Forbes Manz emphasize that the collapse of Abu Sa'id's expedition marked the permanent end of Timurid attempts to recover western Iran and Iraq, establishing the Aq Qoyunlu as the hegemonic power in the region. In the east, Abu Sa'id's death triggered immediate political fragmentation across Transoxiana and Khurasan:

- Sultan Husayn Bayqara seized Herat and established control over Khurasan.
- Sultan Ahmad Mirza retained Samarkand and Bukhara.
- Sultan Mahmud Mirza secured Balkh, Kunduz, Khatlon, Chaghaniyan, Badakhshan, and Hisar.
- Ulugh Beg Mirza II governed Kabul and Ghazni.
- Umar Shaikh Mirza II, the father of Babur (future founder of the Mughal Empire), inherited the Fergana Valley and Khujand.

== See also ==
- Battle of Chapakchur
