= Mirza Yusuf =

Sultan of Qara Qoyunlu from 1468 to 1469

Mirza Yusuf Beg
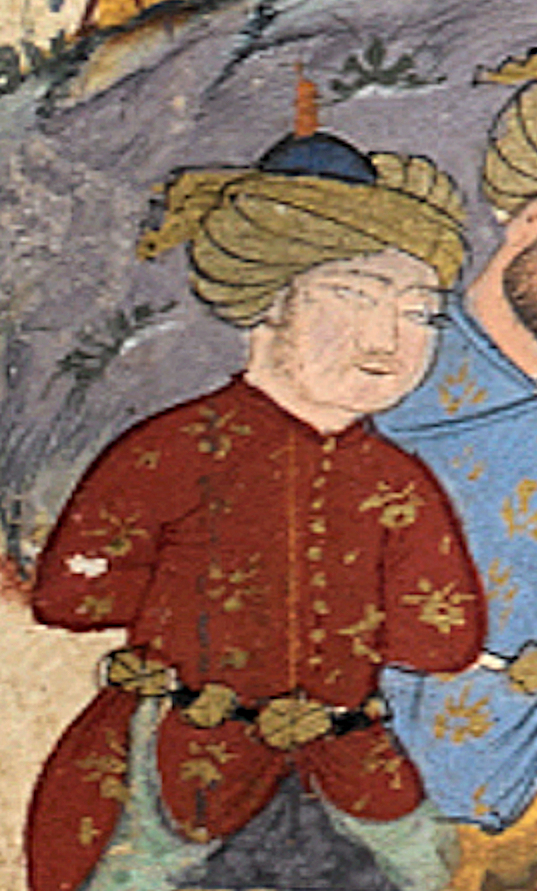

Sultan of Kara Koyunlu
- Reign: 1468–1469
- Predecessor: Hasan Ali
- Successor: Davood Yusuf Beg
- Regent: Pir Ali Beg Baharlu
- Died: 22 October 1469
- Spouse: Daughter of Ali Shukr Beg Baharlu
- Issue: Khadija Begum
- Dynasty: Qara Qoyunlu
- Father: Jahan Shah

Mirza Yusuf (Persian: میرزا یوسف; Azerbaijani: Mirzə Yusif) died 22 October 1469, r. 1468–1469) was the last sultan of the Qara Qoyunlu, also known as the Black Sheep Turkomans, to have significant authority.

== During reign of Jahan Shah ==
Mirza Yusuf was a son of Jahan Shah. He was appointed as governor of Fars in 1464, following his brother Diyaʾ al-Din Yusuf, after the 1460 revolt of his elder brother Pir Budaq. However, he was captured on 11 November 1467 at the Battle of Chapakchur by Uzun Hasan and blinded.

== Reign ==
He was declared sultan by Pir Ali Beg Baharlu, Jahan Shah's amir-al-umara and minister, in 1468. He was soon joined by Sultan Ali (the son of Hasan Ali) and a rival prince of the Aq Qoyunlu, Mirza Mahmud Beg (the son of Osman Beg). They had some military successes in Luristan. However, Mirza Yusuf was soon defeated by Uzun Hasan and had to retreat to Shiraz, where he was killed by Uzun Hasan's son Ughurlu Muhammad on 22 October 1469. Pir Ali Beg Baharlu fled to the court of the Timurid ruler Hasan Bayqara.

In Shiraz, the Aq Qoyunlu took over, with their Governor Sultan Khalil, also a son of Uzun Hasan.

== Family ==
Mirza Yusuf's daughter Khadija Begum married Alvand Mirza's son Pir Quli Beg. Their grandson Quli Qutb Mulk later founded the Qutb Shahi dynasty of India.

== Sources ==
- Woods, John E. (1999). The Aqquyunlu: Clan, Confederation, Empire. New York.
