= Mahmud Haydar =

Khvaja Mahmud-i Haydar was an Iranian statesman and military commander (sardar) who initially served the Timurid Empire, but shifted his allegiance to the Qara Qoyunlu after its ruler Jahan Shah captured his native city of Isfahan in 1452. Mahmud Haydar soon died afterwards.

== Sources ==
- Binbaş, İlker Evrim (2016), Intellectual Networks in Timurid Iran: Sharaf al-Dīn 'Alī Yazdī and the Islamicate Republic of Letters, Cambridge University Press, ISBN 978-1-107-05424-0
- Subtelny, Maria (2007). Timurids in Transition: Turko-Persian Politics and Acculturation in Medieval Iran. Brill. ISBN 978-90-04-16031-6.
