= Pir Budaq =

Qara Qoyunlu prince and governor (died 1466)

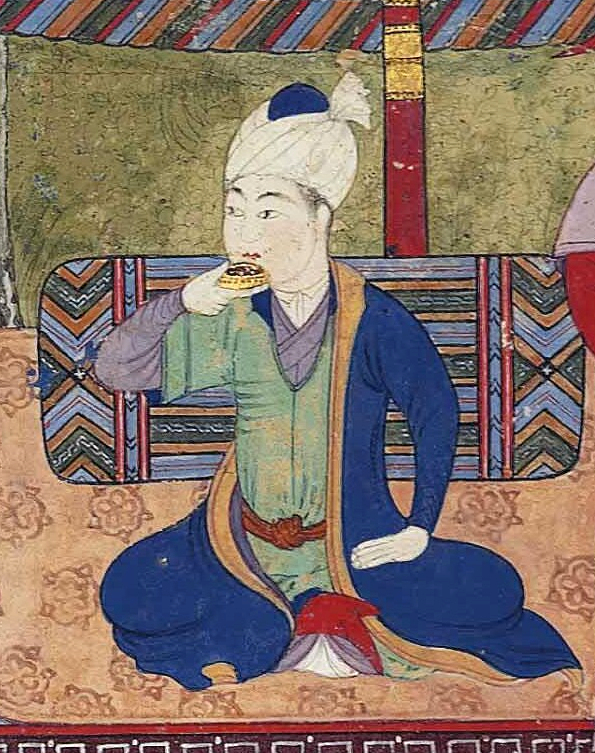
- Pir Budaq (detail, seated center), as depicted in a Persian miniature illustrating his court. Created in Shiraz, c. 1455–1460

Governor of Shiraz
- Tenure: 1456 – 1460
- Predecessor: Sultan Muhammad (Timurid)
- Successor: ?

Governor of Baghdad
- Tenure: 1460 – 1466
- Predecessor: Fulad Mirza
- Successor: ?
- Born: Pir Budaq; Baghdad, Qara Qoyunlu
- Died: 1466; Baghdad, Qara Qoyunlu
- Dynasty: Qara Qoyunlu
- Father: Jahan Shah
- Religion: Islam

Abu'l-Fath Pir Budaq (Persian: ابوالفتح پیربداق; died 1466), more commonly known simply as Pir Budaq (alternatively Pir Budak or Pir Budagh), son of Jahān Shāh of the Qara Qoyunlu dynasty, was governor of Shiraz (1456–1460) and of Baghdad (1460–66) where he introduced a period of political and economic stability. He is noted for developing a library of the finest manuscripts, for his patronage of the arts, for establishing Baghdad as an important centre of the arts and for reinvigorating the art of the book. He has been described as the greatest Turkmen patron of the arts.

== Life and career ==
Pir Budaq was the oldest son of Jahan Shah of the Qara Qoyunlu dynasty, descended from a group of Turkmen pastoralists who had migrated west with the Mongol invasions of the 1200s. Throughout the 1200s and 1300s, the Turkmen rulers embarked on campaigns to seize territories across Central Asia, becoming a dominant power by the mid-1300s.

He was born into a powerful family. His uncle, Shah Muhammad, was the ruler of Baghdad between 1411 and 1433. His grandfather, Qara Yusuf had been the ruler of Azerbaijan from 1410, until Pir Budaq's father, Jahanshah, succeeded him in 1439. A year earlier, Jahanshah had been appointed the ruler of Tabriz as a reward for supporting the Timurid, Shah Rukh. Thereafter, he established Tabriz as the capital of his empire, ruling from there until his death in 1467. Following the death of the Timurid ruler in 1447, Jahanshah became the ruler of Timurid Empire and assumed the title of Shah or Sultan. From the outset, his ambitions to expand the empire were evident. Between 1447 and 1458, Jahanshah and his sons conquered a vast swathe of territory across Central Asia. In 1453, Pir Budaq, the bravest of the sons, conquered Kum, while his father seized Fars, Isfahan and Shiraz.

In 1454, Pir Budaq led an army that conquered Kirman and Yezd. In 1457, Jahanshah took possession of eastern Iran, including Khorasan and in 1458 he entered Herat where he assumed the throne. By the 1460s, Jahanshah's empire extended from the Turkish frontier on the west, the two Iraqs; Kirman and the shores of the Persian Gulf.

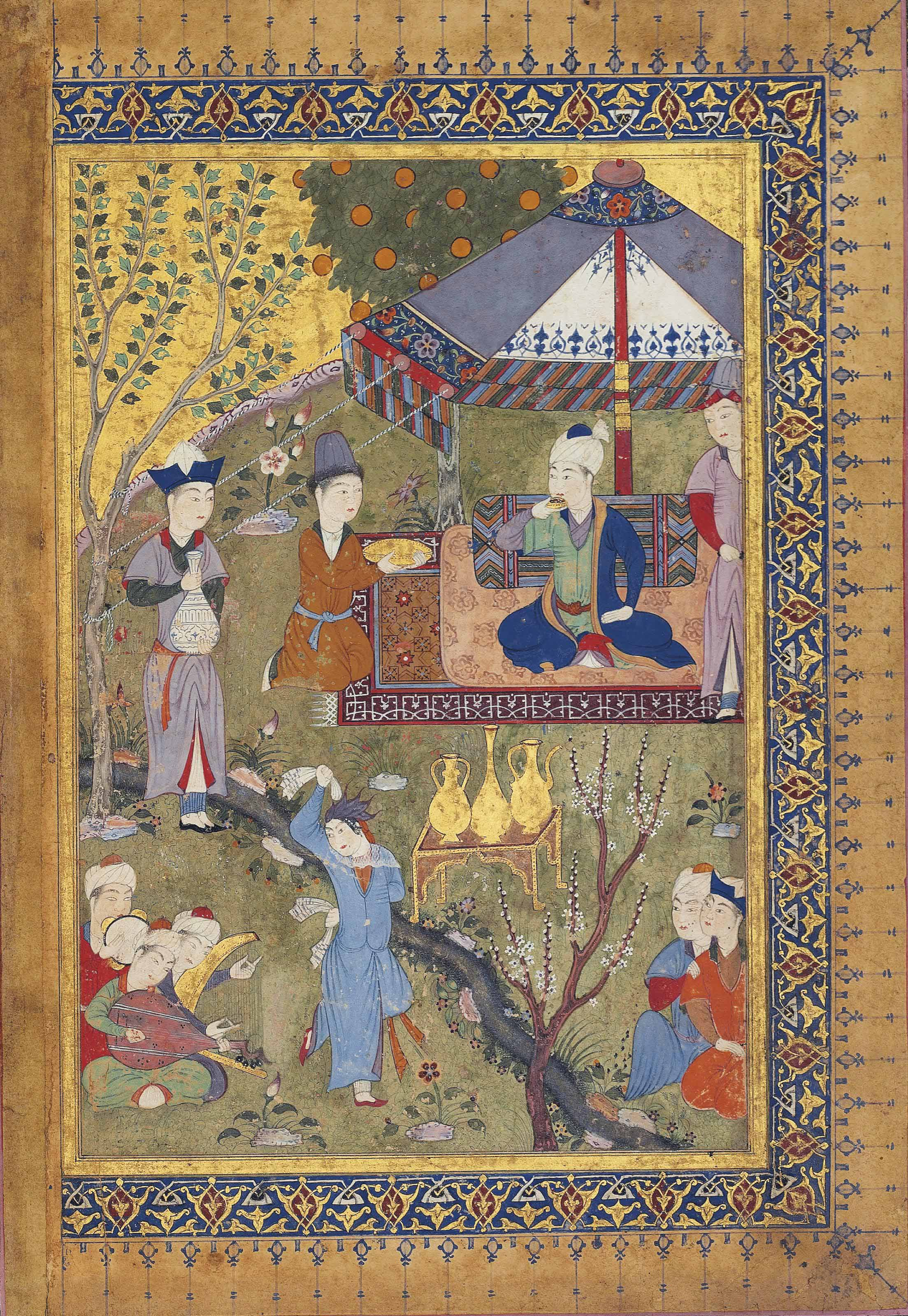
The court of Pir Budaq, Shiraz, Iran, circa 1455–60.

Pir Budaq fought alongside his father on many of the successful military campaigns; for instance, when he annexed Isfahan, Shiraz and Abarquh in 1452–53. Due to Pir Budaq's military prowess, his father summoned him to assist in the Herat campaign in 1458. It was probably on these military campaigns that Pir Budaq was first exposed to Persian illustrated manuscripts and developed his passion for book art. Jahanshah installed Pir Budaq as the governor of Shiraz in 1456 and another son, Yusuf as governor of Kirman in around 1458.

Relations between Jahanshah and his sons were never good. Contemporary accounts paint Jahanshah as a blood-thirsty, tyrant who had little regard for Sacred Law, and who passed his nights in revelry and drunkenness. In spite of his military success, his rule was plagued by persistent rebellions, particularly from his sons, Pir Budaq and Hassan Ali as well as the semi-autonomous Qara Qoyunlu leaders. In 1459, Hasan Ali led a mutiny of nomadic feudal lords in Azerbaijan at the same time as Jahanshah was fighting with the Timurid, Abu Seyyid. For his treachery, Hasan Ali was imprisoned.

Pir Budaq, who clearly harboured ambitions to become a ruler in his own right, rebelled against his father by seeking independence for Shiraz; a move that aroused his father's anger. Several emissaries from Jahanshah's court visited Pir Budaq and pleaded with him to drop his rebellious attitude, but when it became clear that he would not listen, his father attacked and re-established his authority over the city. Pir Budaq's mother interceded and negotiated terms, which saw him banished from Shiraz, and replaced as governor with a younger brother, Yusuf. In Shiraz and Fars, he was succeeded in 1460 by his brother Diyaʾ al-Din Yusuf, and then Mirza Yusuf from 1464, until the Aq Qoyunlu took over the region in 1468 and installed Sultan Khalil.

For his part, Pir Budaq was sent to Baghdad as governor. This was a strategic choice on his father's part; since Baghdad was much closer to Tabriz where Budaq would be subject to his father's watchful supervision.

In Baghdad, Pir Budaq rebelled again. In response, his father, placed the city under siege for eighteen months, forcing a surrender. In 1466 Pir Budaq's father ordered another of his sons, Muhammadi, to lead the assault on Baghdad and Pir Budaq was assassinated. Pir Budaq was survived by his father, however, his father's empire was short-lived. Jahanshah was defeated and killed by a rival Qara Qoyunlu clan in 1467.

== Patronage of the arts ==
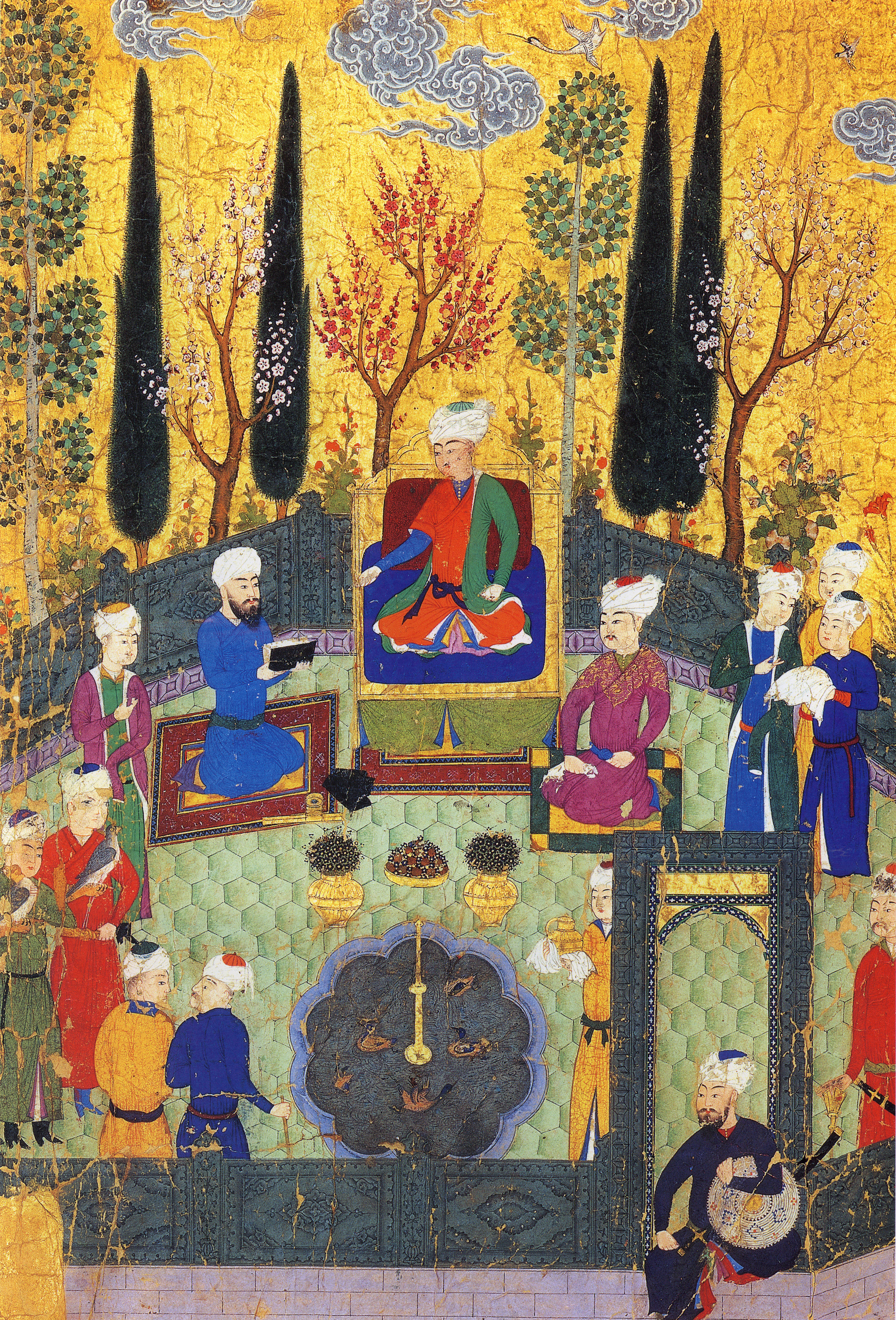
Pir Budaq and his court. Frontispiece from a copy of Kalila wa Dimna of Abu’l-Ma‘ali Nasr Allah. Baghdad (possibly), c. 1465. Gulistan Palace Library, no. 827

Pir Budaq's father, Jahanshah, unlike his Qara Quonyulu ancestors, cultivated an interest in the arts. He commissioned monuments in a number of Persian cities, notably the Blue Mosque in Tabriz. He was an accomplished poet, writing under the pen name of Haqiqi. His poetry, produced in both Turkish and Persian, demonstrates the divine quality of the word. Pir Budaq also wrote poetry. A couplet from one of his poems written for his father, threatens to eradicate his father from the world:

Both my fortune and I are young
do not attempt to fight with two young ones
I shall so throw you up and down,
That no sign shall remain from you or your name.

In Shiraz, Pir Budaq commissioned many manuscripts and established a library of high quality works. Under his patronage, a flourishing arts industry developed there.

Although, a number of manuscripts were made for Pir Budaq during his time in Shiraz, none of these were illustrated. Following the successful Herat campaign in 1458, an unfinished, illustrated manuscript of a famous poem, Khamsa, by Nezami, formerly in the possession of the Herat's deposed ruler, passed to Pir Budaq.

Scholars believe that when Pir Budaq was sent to Baghdad, he took a number of the best illustrators and calligraphers with him. Prior to his arrival in Baghdad, local production of manuscripts had dwindled due to an uncertain economic and political environment. However, Pir Budaq took advantage of the pool of talented calligraphers, illustrators and poets and reinvigorated the arts.

Almost as soon as he arrived in Baghdad, he exhibited a clear interest in illustrated manuscripts. His preference was for compendia of poetry. Manuscripts produced during Pir Budaq's Baghdad tenure exhibit an "ostentatious use of lapis lazuli and gold". Works collected after 1458 exhibit a strong influence of Herat painting.

Under his patronage, Baghdad became an important centre for the arts, attracting calligraphers and illustrators from around the region. Pir Budaq has been described as one of the earliest of the Turkmen patrons of the arts.

== See also ==
- Illuminated manuscript
- Iraqi art
- Manuscript culture
- Medieval art
- Persian art
- Persian poetry
- Timurid dynasty
- Timurid Empire
