= Diyaʾ al-Din Yusuf =

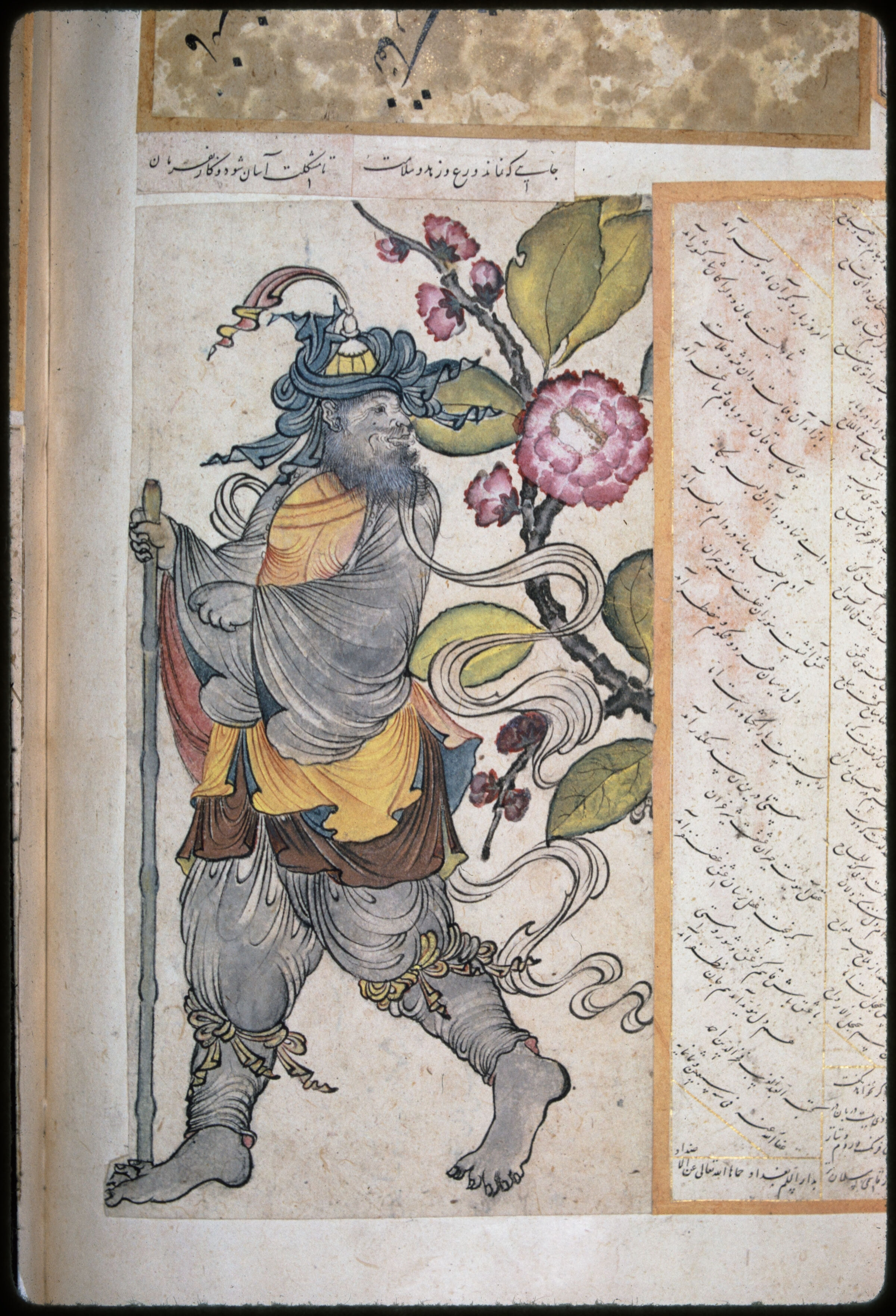
H. 2160, fol. 41b, calligraphy signed by Yusuf b. Jahanshah in 867 (1462–63), in Shiraz.

Diyaʾ al-Din Yusuf, also Yusuf b. Jahanshah, was a son of the Qara Qoyunlu ruler Jahan Shah. In Shiraz and Fars, he succeeded in 1460 his brother Pir Budaq, who was transferred to the governorship of Baghdad.

Diyaʾ al-Din Yusuf was replaced by Mirza Yusuf from 1464, until the Aq Qoyunlu took over the region in 1468 and installed Sultan Khalil.

Diyaʾ al-Din Yusuf is known to have put some efforts in calligraphy, because of manuscripts which are signed by him: Topkapı Sarayı Müzesi H. 2153, fol. 20a, which is signed Yusuf b. Jahanshah, and H. 2160, fol. 41b, also signed by Yusuf b. Jahanshah in 867 (1462–63), in Shiraz.
