= Jameh Mosque of Yazd =

Shi'ite mosque in Yazd, Yazd province, Iran

Jāmeh Mosque of Yazd
- مسجد جامع یزد
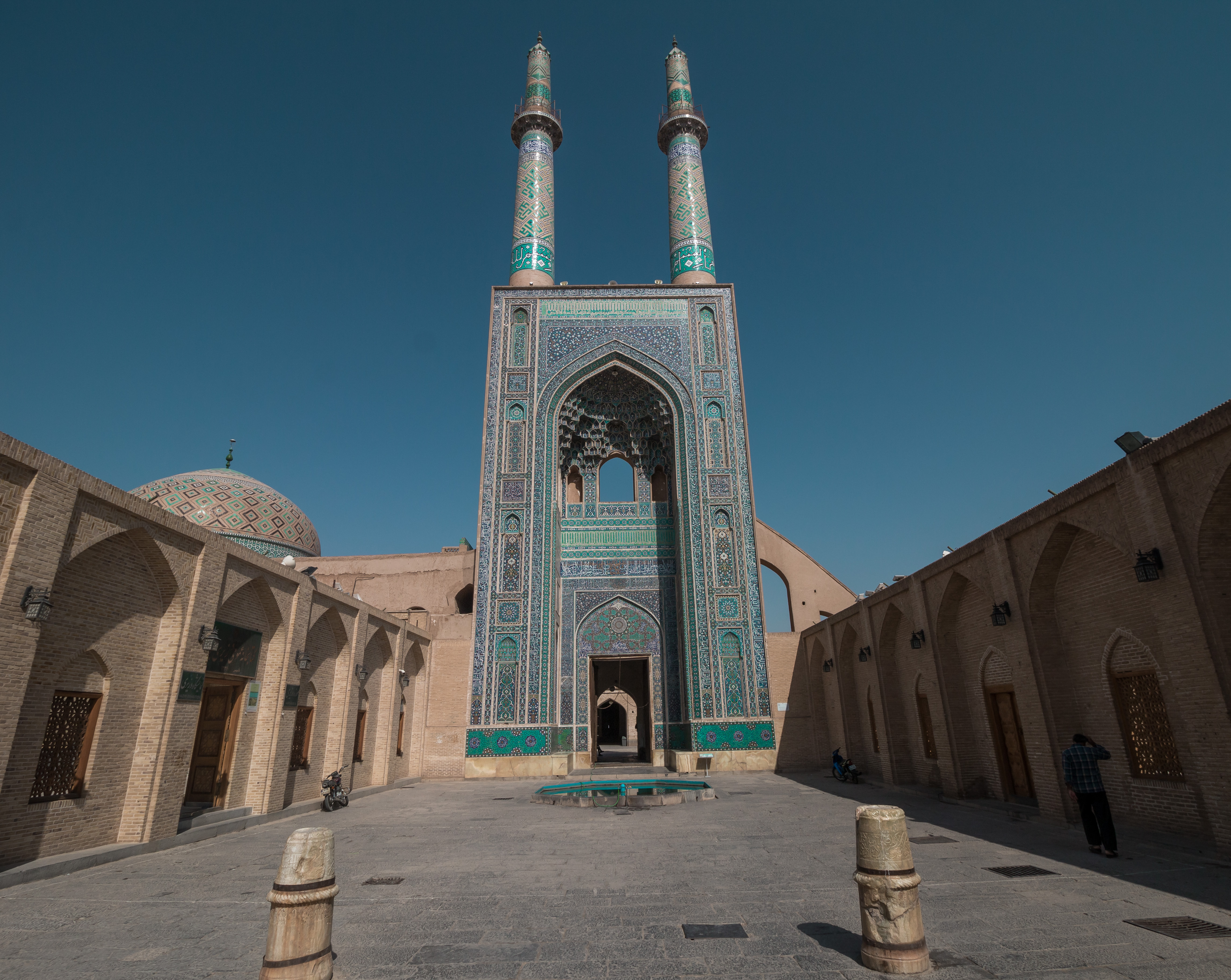
- Entrance portal of the mosque, with minarets and main dome, in 2016

- Location of the mosque in Iran

Religion
- Affiliation: Shia Islam
- Ecclesiastical or organisational status: Friday mosque
- Status: Active

Location
- Location: Yazd, Yazd Province
- Country: Iran
- Coordinates: 31°54′5″N 54°22′7″E

Architecture
- Type: Mosque architecture
- Style: Ilkhanid; Timurid (renovation); Safavid (minaret); Qajar (sahn)
- Founder: Amr ibn al-Layth (prime); Rukn al-Din Muhammad (renovation)
- Completed: 9th century CE (prime); 12th century CE (prime); 1375 CE (mihrab); 1416 CE (iwans); 15th century CE (minaret); 1442 CE (renovation); 1485 CE (mihrab); 16th century CE (minaret); 1825 CE (sahn)

Specifications
- Dome: Two
- Minaret: Two
- Minaret height: 52 m (171 ft)
- Materials: Bricks; mortar; tiles

Website
- mosque.mihanblog.com

Iran National Heritage List
- Official name: Jāmeh Mosque of Yazd
- Type: Built
- Designated: 22 July 1934
- Reference no.: 206
- Conservation organization: Cultural Heritage, Handicrafts and Tourism Organization of Iran

The Jāmeh Mosque of Yazd (Persian: مسجد جامع یزد, romanized: Masjid-e-Jāmeh Yazd; Arabic: جامع يزد) is a Friday mosque (jāmeh) located in the city of Yazd, in the province of Yazd, Iran. Built on the site of a 9th-century CE fire temple, the mosque was completed during the 14th and 15th centuries CE and renovated in subsequent years. Between 1982 and 2005 the mosque was depicted on the obverse of the Iranian 200 rial banknote. The mosque has served as the spiritual center of Yazd for centuries, and is renowned for its complete display of architectural motifs from Medieval Persian dynasties as well as Zoroastrian and Muslim coexistence in the city of Yazd.

The mosque was added to the Iran National Heritage List on 22 July 1934, administered by the Cultural Heritage, Handicrafts and Tourism Organization of Iran. The mosque, along with other monuments in Yazd, was inscribed as a UNESCO world heritage site in 2017.

== History ==
Prior to the construction of the 14th century mosque, the site had hosted a religious temple for millennia. According to historians, this first religious building, a Sasanian era Zoroastrian fire temple, was constructed around the 5th century CE. In the medieval Buyud Dynasty, Shah Ala'oddoleh Garshasb commenced building the mosque. The second mosque was constructed by order of Ala'oddoleh Kalanjar in the 12th century CE, and was largely destroyed in the 13th century Mongol conquests. The main construction of the present building was done by order of the Mongol Il-khanid dynasty, under Shah Rukn al-Din Muhammad during the 14th century CE. The main mosque was substantially completed in 1457.

Since its substantial completion, the Jameh Mosque of Yazd has been modified by several successive Persian dynasties, most notably the Safavids who added large minarets to the sides of the mosques. Subsequent dynasties have renovated the mosque by adding additional tiling and decorations in Kufic and Thuluth scripts.

== Architecture ==
The mosque exemplifies Persian architecture, specifically the Azari style, which thrived from the late 13th century to the start of the Safavid dynasty in the 16th century. Azari-style mosque elements include grand iwans, as seen in the Muzzafarid-constructed southeastern iwan entrance, and the domed vestibules, like the one built during Il-khanid rule.

During the 15th century, Yazd saw large population growth and hence many new mosques were built. The Jameh Mosque of Iran served as a blueprint for many mosques. The mosque is well known for its pishtaq, or entrance elements and its accompanying minarets. The Jameh Mosque of Yazd also features numerous elements of Zoroastrian architectural styles, including the iwan design and vaulted roof design, present in Zoroastrian fire temples.

=== Il-khanid rebuilding (1324-1334) ===
The complex of the mosque was initially founded in the 12th century, but nothing remains, and it was possibly destroyed by the Mongols. The "new mosque" (masjid-i jadid) which is visible today was built by the Il Khanids in 1324-28, during the reign of Abu Sa'id Bahadur Khan, including the entrance portal, the main iwan and the dome. The tall southeastern entrance iwan in particular is characteristic of Ilkhanid architecture. The mosque was further expanded in 1365 under the Muzaffarids. A second phase after 1334 included the completion of the iwan and possibly some revetments. The southeastern portal iwan is decorated with the 99 different names of Allah, written in Kufic script. The iwan is adjacent to a domed vestibule, which is designed in an octagonal layout. Uncommon for Persian mosques, the domed vestibule was made entirely of terracotta in black, white, and blue, which formed ornate geometrical patterns. Few of the Kufic scripts from this period survive, and the Il-khanid style designs are located primarily in the domed vestibule.

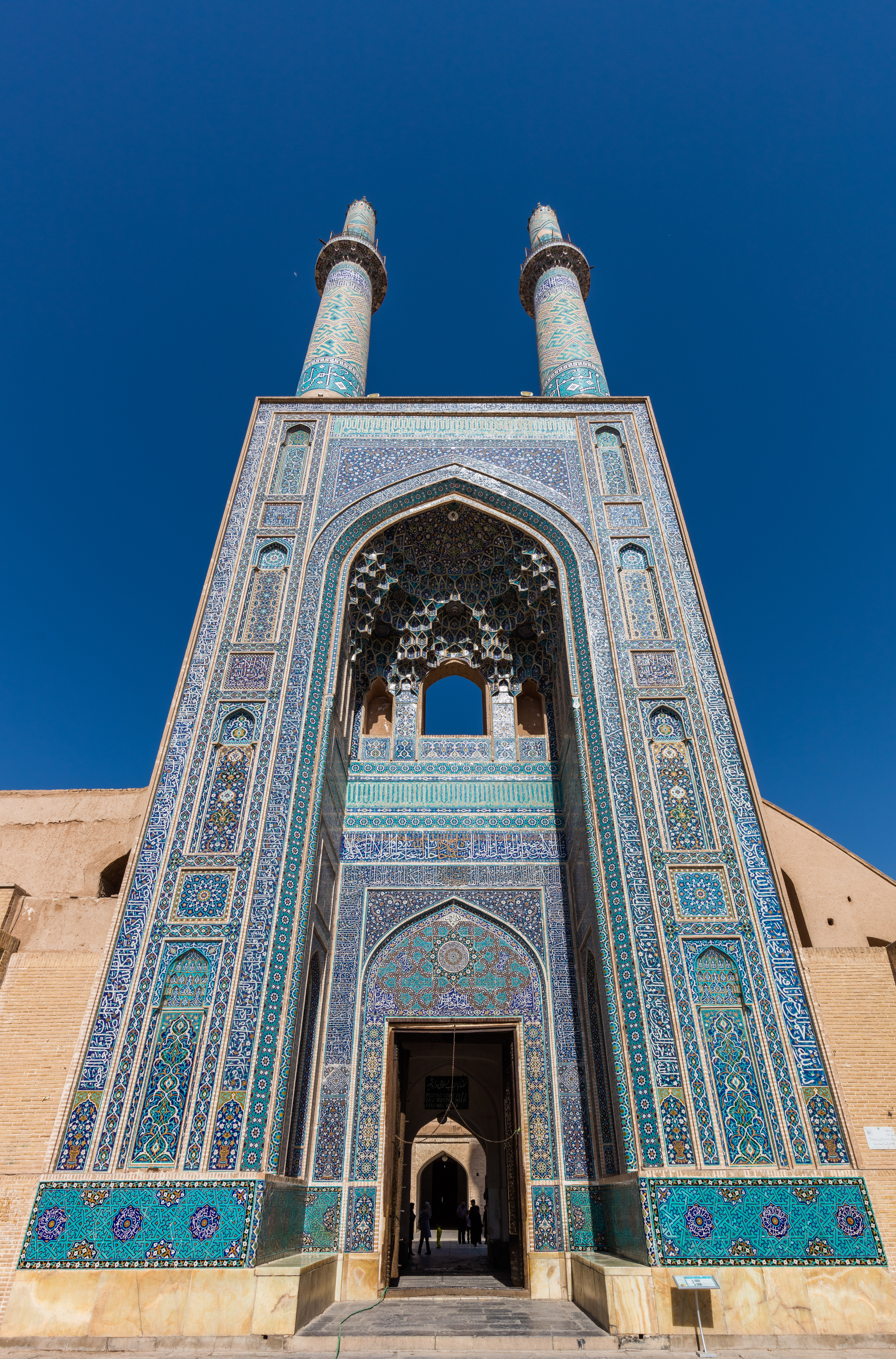
Entrance portal (southeast)

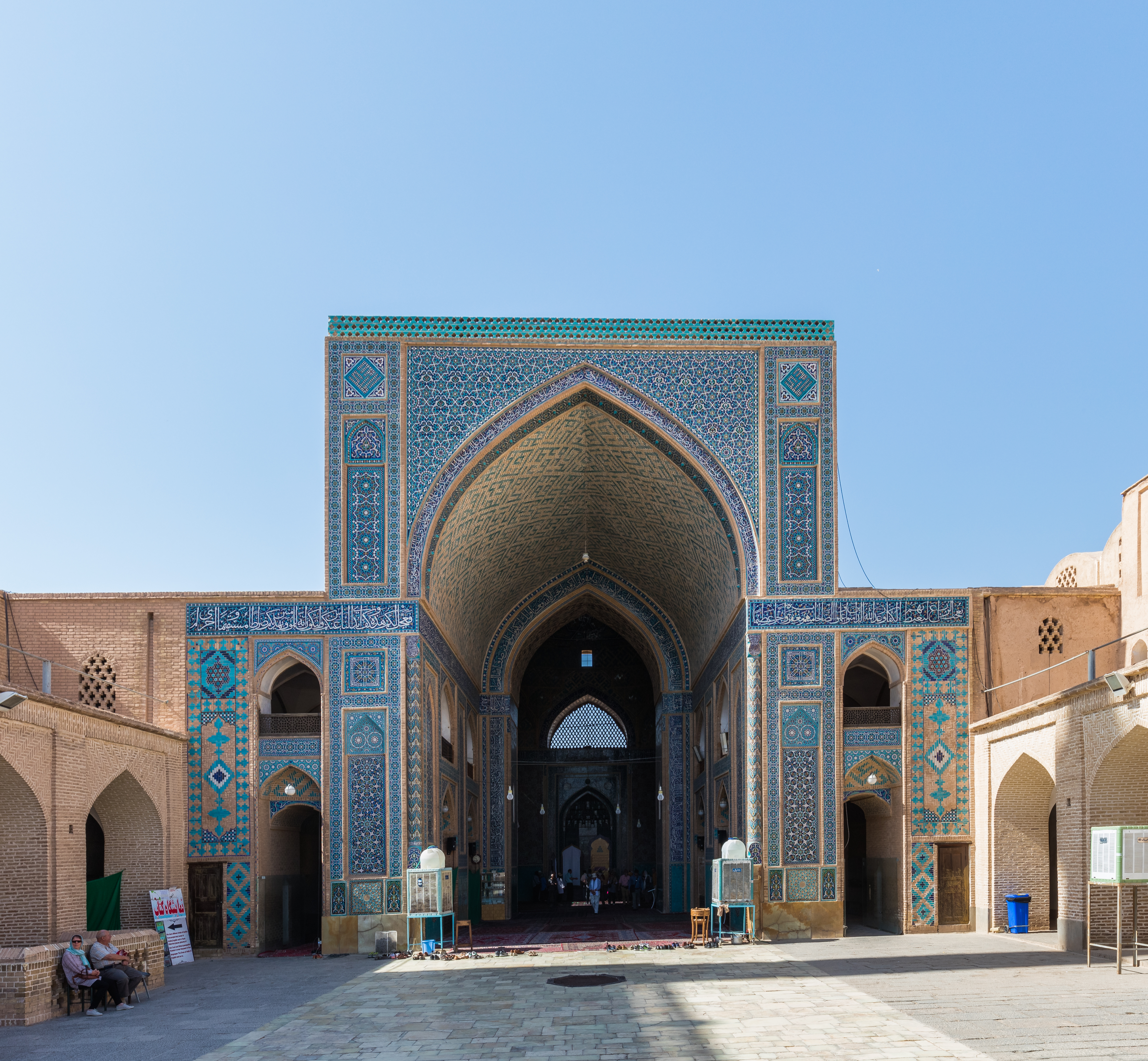
Main iwan (southwest)

=== Muzzafarid contribution (1364-1376) ===
Within is a long arcaded courtyard where, behind a deep-set south-east iwan, is the sanctuary chamber. The constructions of the second period (1364-1376) include the south prayer hall, vestibule and galleries, the tile-mosaic mihrab, and some of the revetments of the dome chamber. (Note: "Period 2, 765/1364 and 777/1375-76, includes construction of the south prayer hall, vestibule, and galleries adjoining the dome chamber; filling in the central alcoves in the dome chamber; the mosaic faience mihrab, some revetments in the dome chamber and on the court facade; the reconstruction of the entrance portal and revetment (now lost, for the most part)." in) The chamber, under a squat tiled dome, is exquisitely decorated with tile mosaic: its tall tiled mihrab, dated 1365 CE to the Muzaffarids, is one of the finest of its kind in existence. The name of the craftsman and the date of construction of the mihrab are depicted on two star-shaped sgraffito tiles. The dome itself, with a design of geometric arabesque of blue and black tile mosaics on a beige background, was completed in 1375. One of the amazing attributes of the Jameh Mosque of Yazd is that the lighting system is obtained indirectly by the reflection of light from the white plaster of the dome and the walls. Much of the dome is made of faience, a style of earthenware tiling where mosaic fragments are stuck together.

The mo'araq tile-mosaic mihrab is also dated to 1375-76. It has the particularity of using large-sized tile fragments, whether Timurid tile-mosaics tended to use smaller fragments. The Mihrab itself was entirely made of marble, and much of the marble was sourced from Karbala, Iraq. The top of the mihrab contains a celestial pattern, which also serves as a guide to the mihrab's color, in case renovation was needed. The mihrab also features a variety of characteristic Mazzafarid-era floral motifs. Unique for Persian mosques, the mihrab has separate entrances for men and women. Smaller, Timurid-style minarets were also built at the same time as the mihrab, in 1375, and were later completely replaced under the Safavid empire.

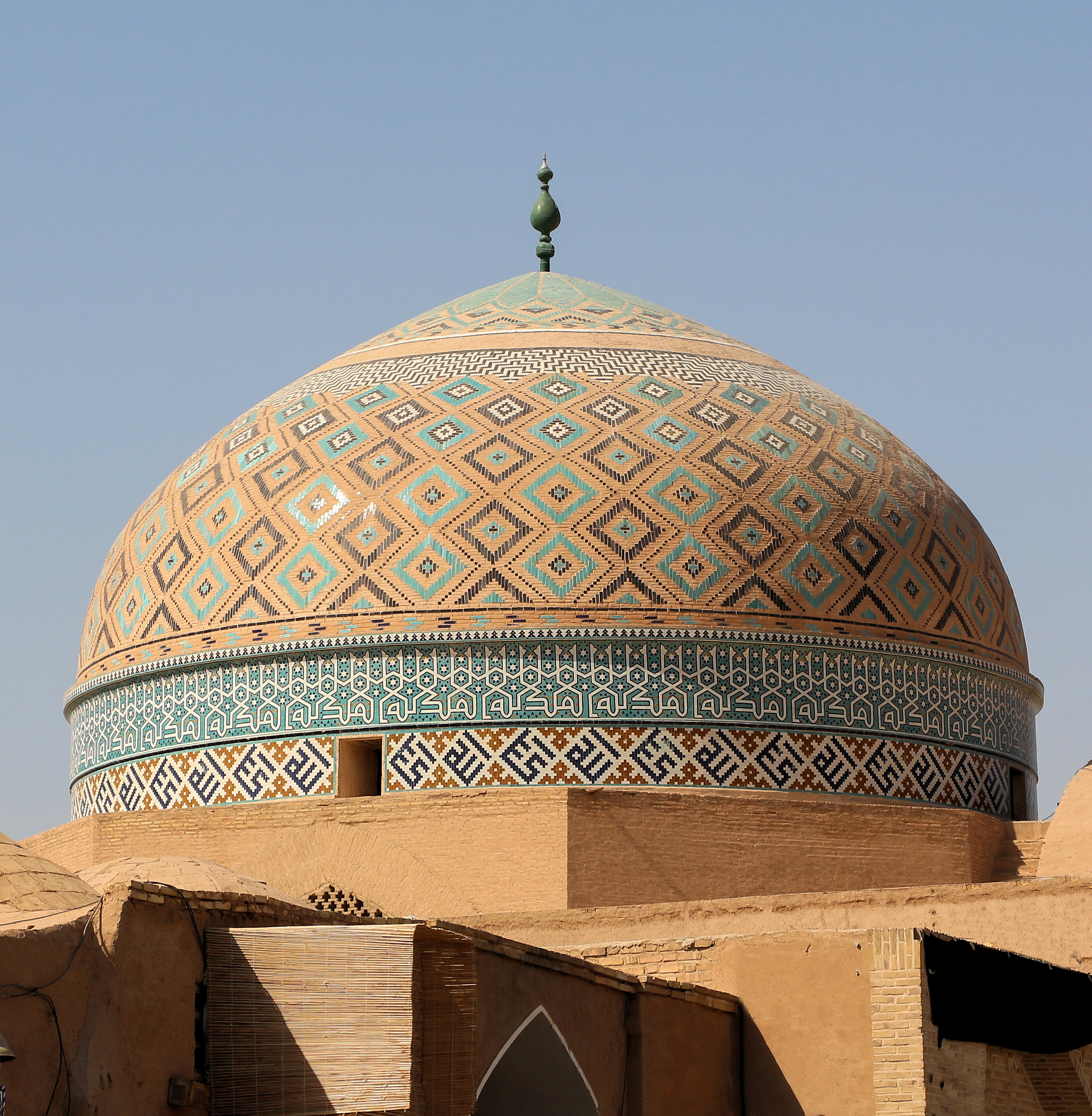
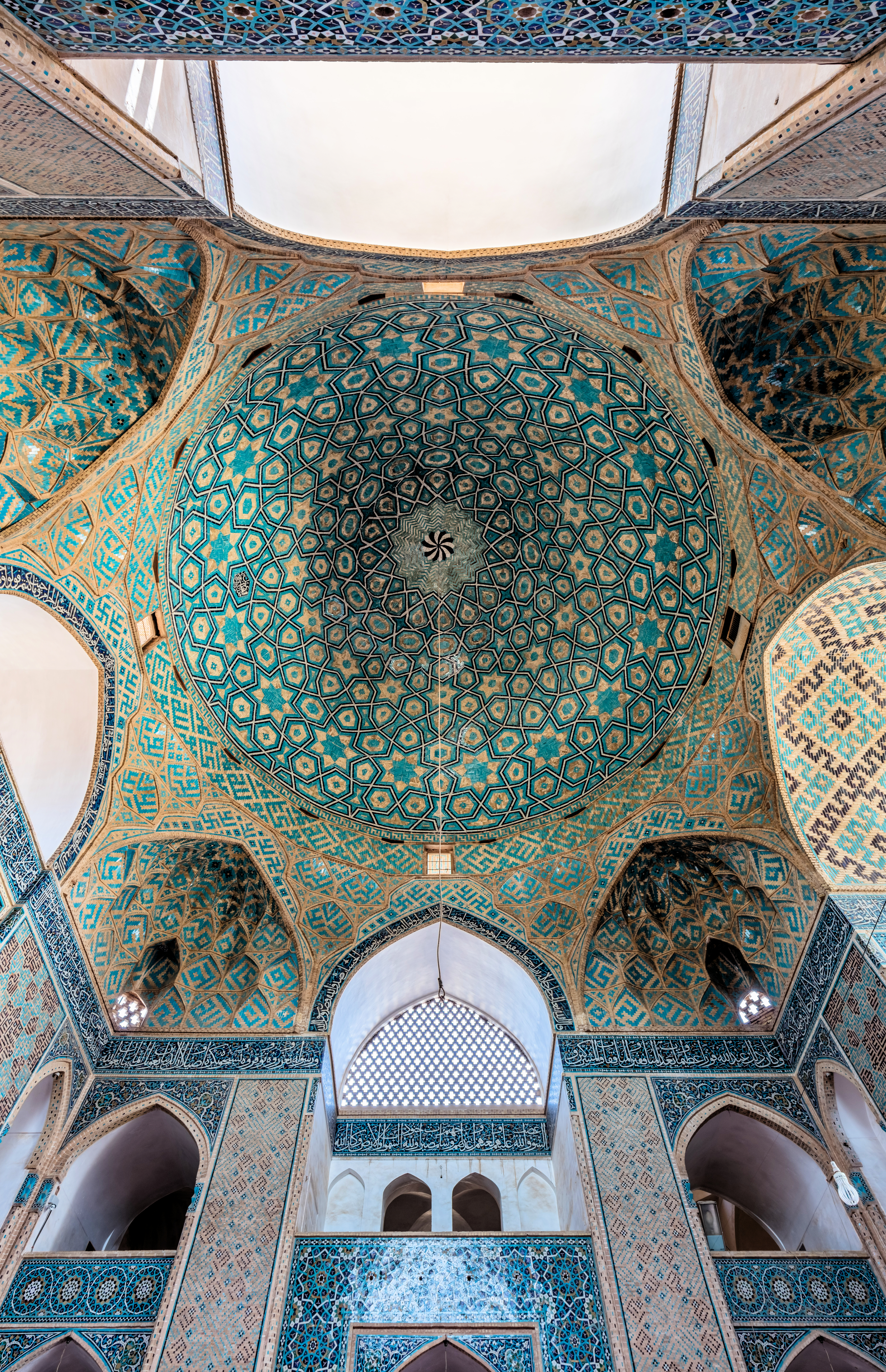
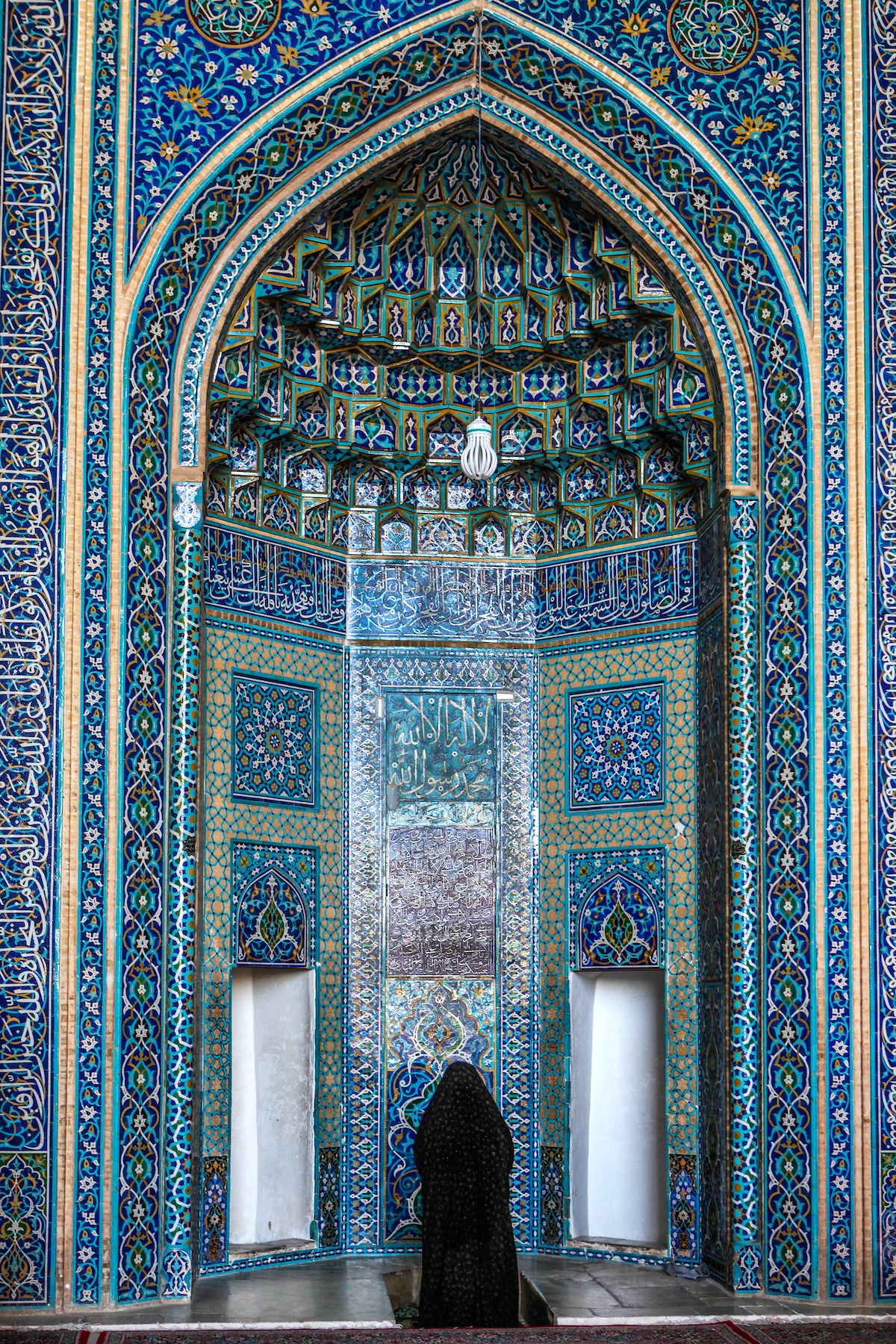
Muzaffarid structure and decoration of the dome and inside of the Jameh Mosque of Yazd, and mihrab, 1375.

=== Timurids (1406-1417) ===
The third main period under the Timurids included the construction of the north prayer hall and some galleries, some revetments and the marble minbar. The Timurids added muqarnas, or stalactite vaulting, mostly around the entrance portal to the mosque. They are among the most well preserved muqarnas in Central Asia. (Note: "Period 3, 809-819 /1406-1417, includes construction of the north prayer hall, its vestibule, and communicating galleries; Quranic inscriptions in the ivan and on the court; some revetments, possibly the tile dado; and the marble minbar." in)

=== Qara Qoyunlu renovations (1438-1467) ===
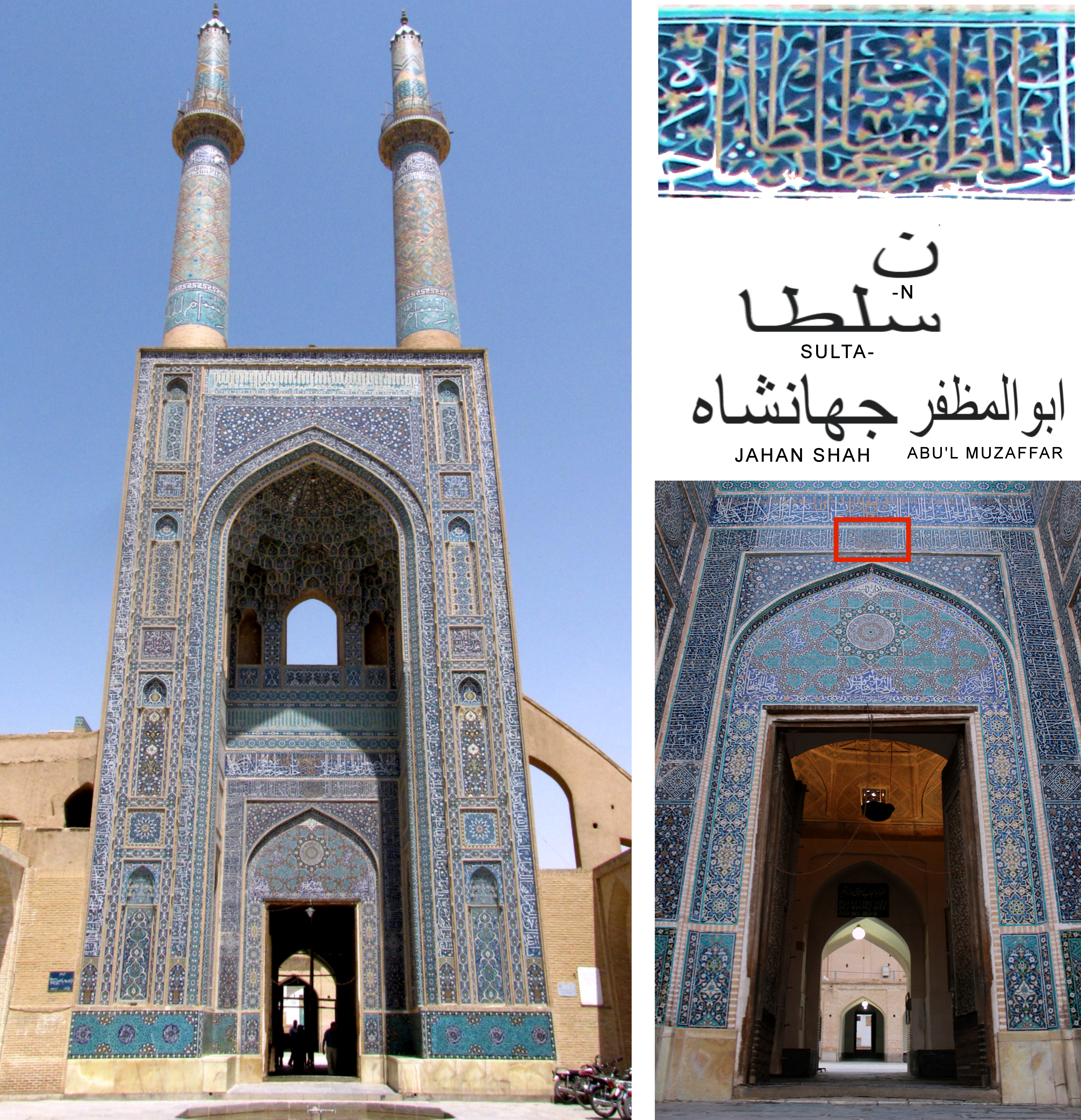
Dedication of Qara Qoyunlu ruler Jahan Shah on the gate of the eastern entrance iwan of Jameh Mosque of Yazd, in 1457.

The Qara Qoyunlu ruler Jahan Shah (r.1438–1467) is known for renovation work on the Eastern entrance iwan of the Jameh Mosque of Yazd in 1457. The portal has a central dedication in the name of Jahanshah: "the structure of this lofty arch (taf) was restored during the reign of . . . Abu’l-Muzaffar Sultan Jahanshah, Nizam al Dawlah wa’l-Din al-Hajj Qanbar, in Dhu’l-Hijjah 861." It is thought that the contribution was specifically related to the muqarnas of the portal. (Note: "9. Dhu’l-Hijjah 861 /October 1457 (p. 126, 3/4). Mosaic faience surrounding the rectangular frame of the doorway of the portal: “. . . the structure of this lofty arch (taf) was restored during the reign of . . . Abu’l-Muzaffar Sultan Jahanshah, Nizam al Dawlah wa’l-Din al-Hajj Qanbar, in Dhu’l-Hijjah 861. Written by Muhammad al-Hakim.” The vault in question is probably the muqarnas of the portal." in) The entrance is decorated from top to bottom in tilework. The Qara Qoyunlu renovations also added substantial amounts of deep blue tile work, characteristic of the empire's style. Many of the renovation elements are also found in other Qara Qoyunlu renovations and builds, like the Masjid-i Muzaffariyya of Tabriz, Iran.

=== Safavids (1524-1576) ===
The entrance to the mosque is crowned by a pair of minarets, the highest in Iran, dating from the Safavid era (possibly Shah Tahmasp) and are 52 metres (171 ft) high and 6 metres (20 ft) in diameter. (Note: "Although not referring to the Timurid period, one should note a statement by Mufid that Shah Tahmasp (930-984/1524-1576) erected two minarets over the portal and placed a dome over the existing one (vol. Ill, pp. 170,644-645)." in) The previous minarets, constructed during the Ilkhanid Dynasty, were destroyed and rebuilt during the Safavid dynasty, echoing the Safavid Empire's state religion of Twelver Shia Islam. The minarets are composed of turquoise and blue tiles, and are decorated with geometric designs and Kufic Script. The names of famous Shia imams and prophets adorn the minarets.

=== Qajars (1789-1925) ===
In the early 19th century, the Qajar Dynasty commenced extensive remodeling of the mosque's facade and courtyard (sahn), finishing in 1825. Earlier in 1815, the two minarets collapsed and were destroyed in an earthquake. Architects from the Qajar dynasty rebuilt them in the same style as the Safavids. Around the portal arch, the names of numerous Qajar emperors and figures, written in Thuluth script, were added around the mid-19th century.

== See also ==
- Shia Islam in Iran
- List of mosques in Iran
- Persian domes

== Sources ==
- Golombek, Lisa; Wilber, Donald Newton (1988). The Timurid Architecture of Iran and Turan (Vol. 1, 2). Princeton, NJ: Princeton Univ. Pr. ISBN 978-0691035871.
- Wilber, Donald Newton. The Architecture of Islamic Iran: The Il Khānid Period. Ireland: Greenwood Press, 1969, (159-160).
- UNESCO World Heritage Centre. Historic City of Yazd. Available at: https://whc.unesco.org/en/list/1544/.
- Neghabi, Mahboobe, and Ahad Nejad Ebrahimi. “A Comparative Study of Yazd Jame Mosque and Tabriz Mozaffariyeh Mosque (Kabud Mosque) to Identify the Distinctions and Commonalities in Timurid and Turkmen Architecture.” Journal of Iranian Islamic Period History 15, no. 38 (Spring 2024): 1-7. https://tuhistory.tabrizu.ac.ir/jufile?ar_sfile=390160.
- Holod, Renata. Architecture, Patronage and Setting in Iran: A Case Study of Yazd, 1300–1450. PhD diss., Harvard University, 1972.

== Gallery ==
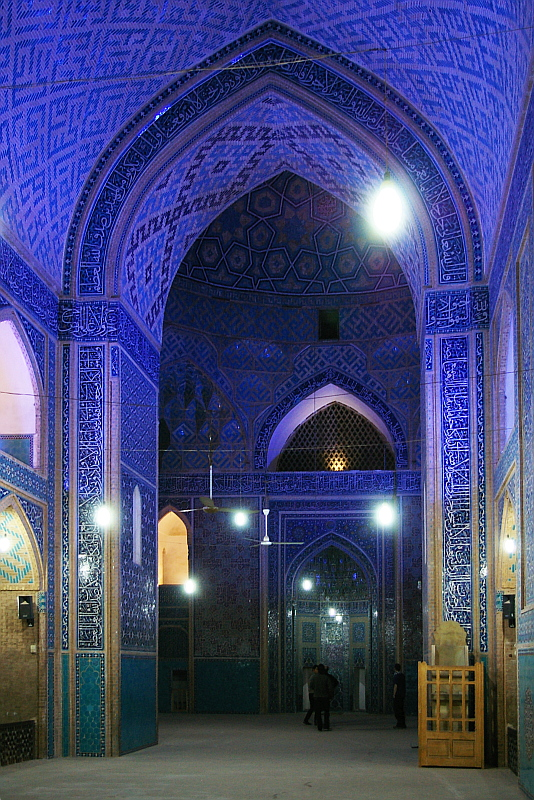
Mosque interior with rich tile- and brickworks

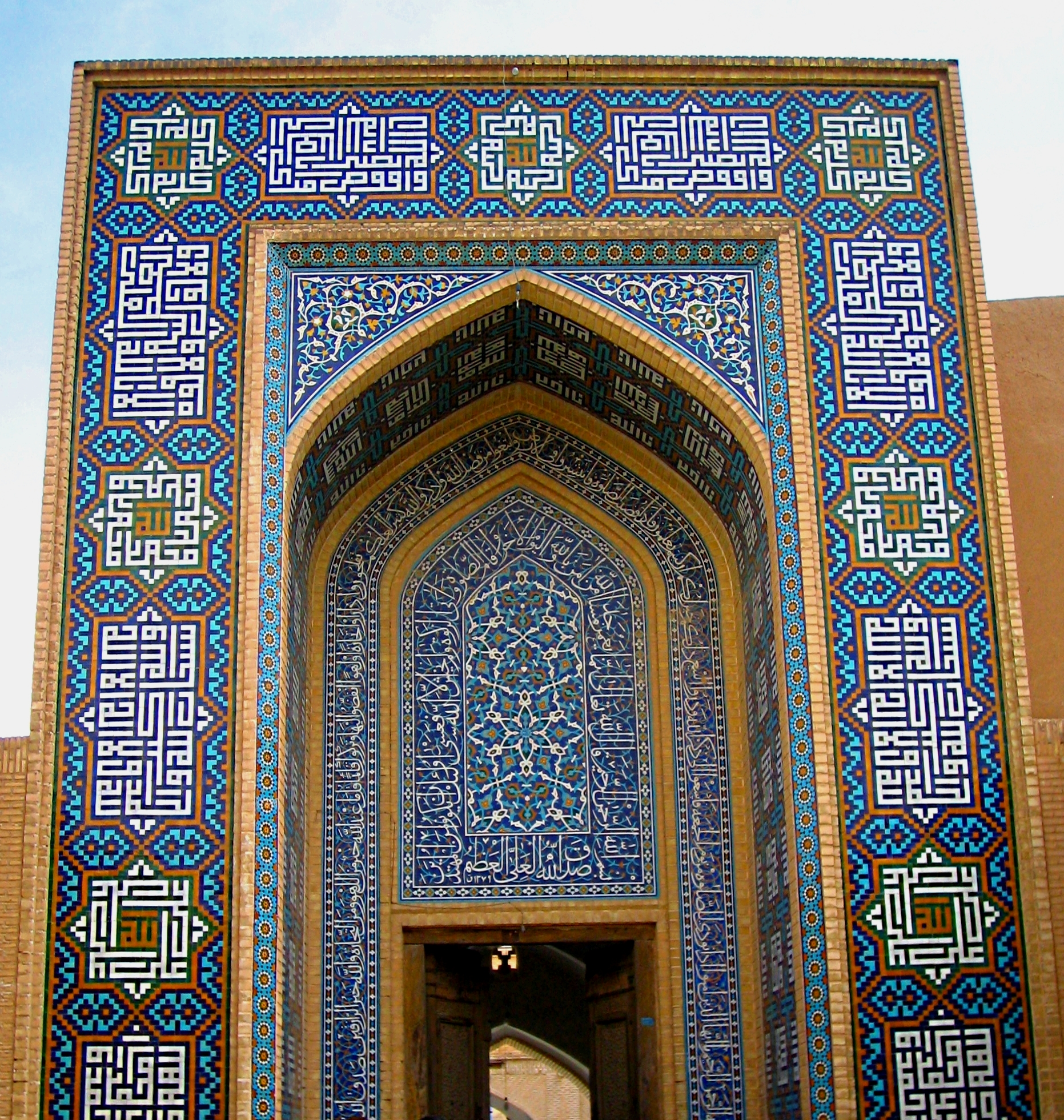
Back entrance to the mosque (northwest)

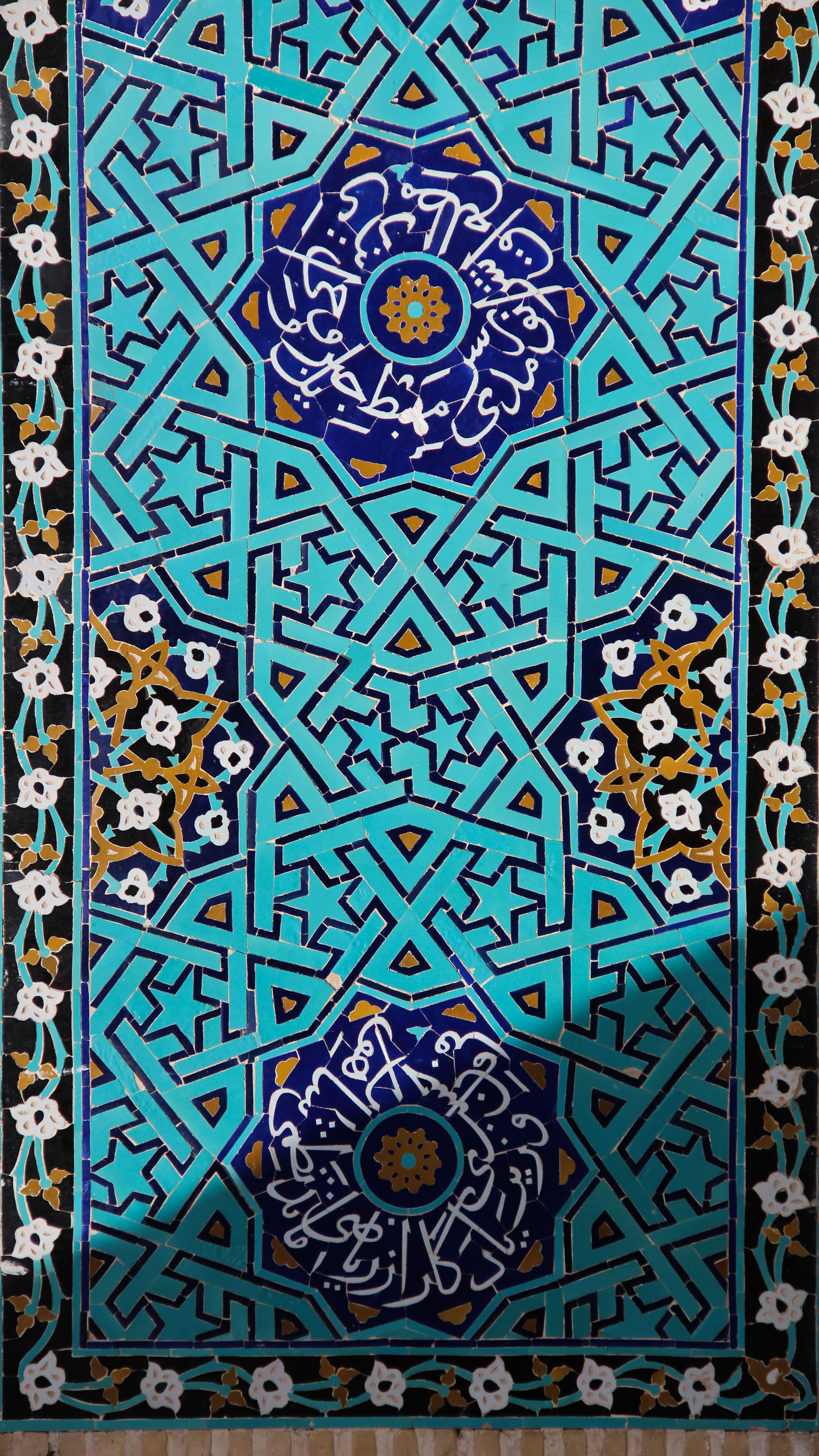
Detail

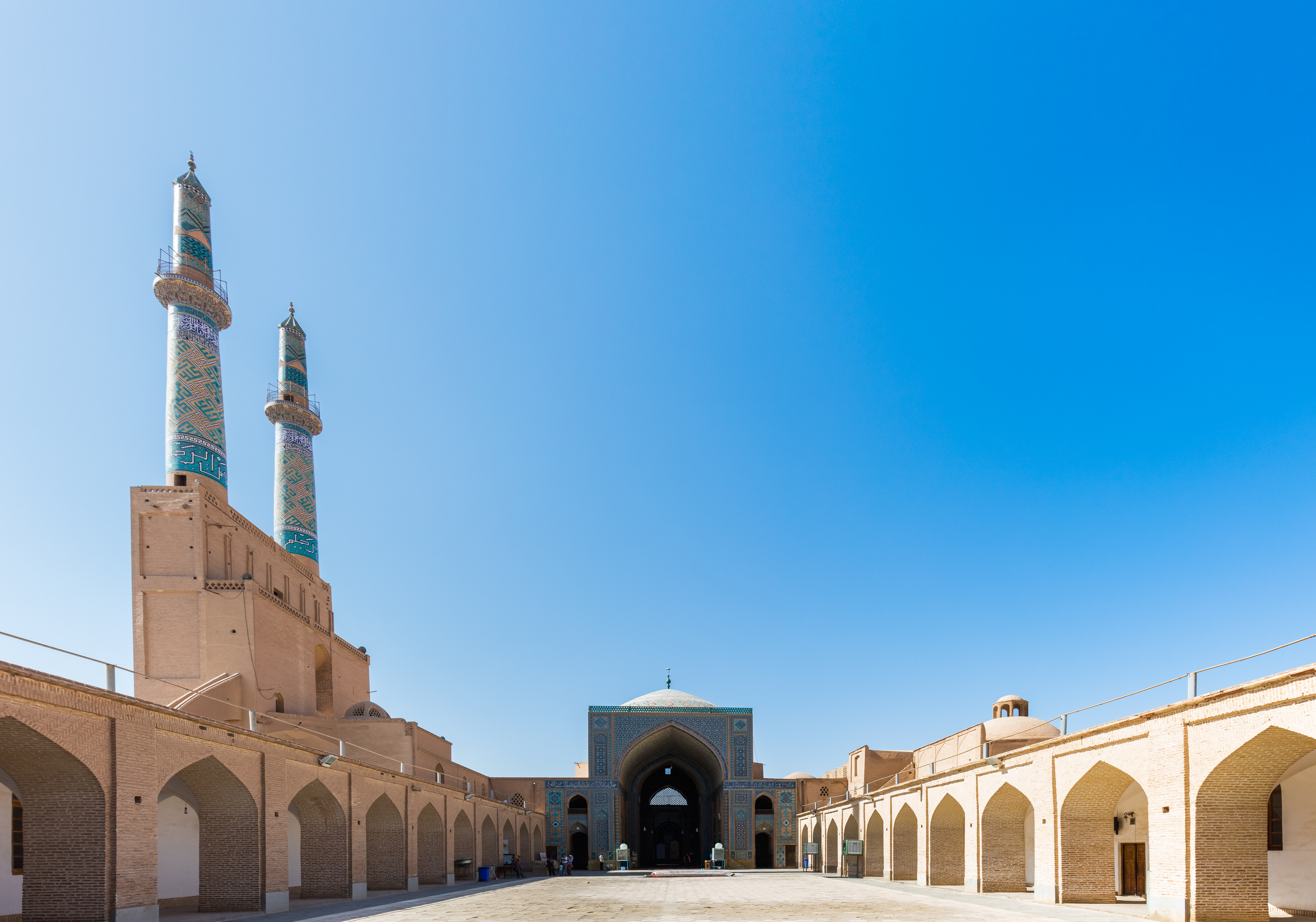
Courtyard

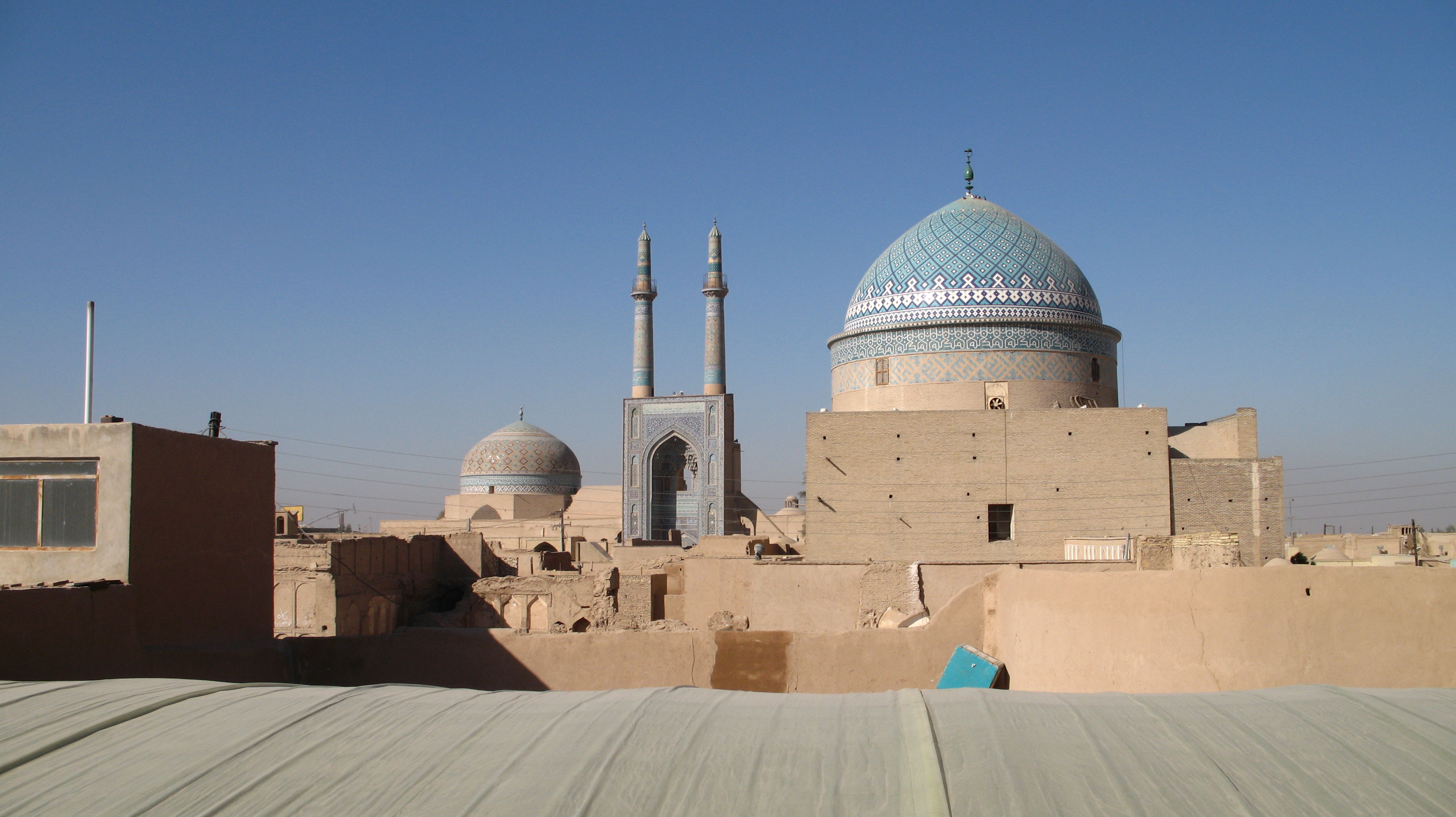
View of the entire mosque complex

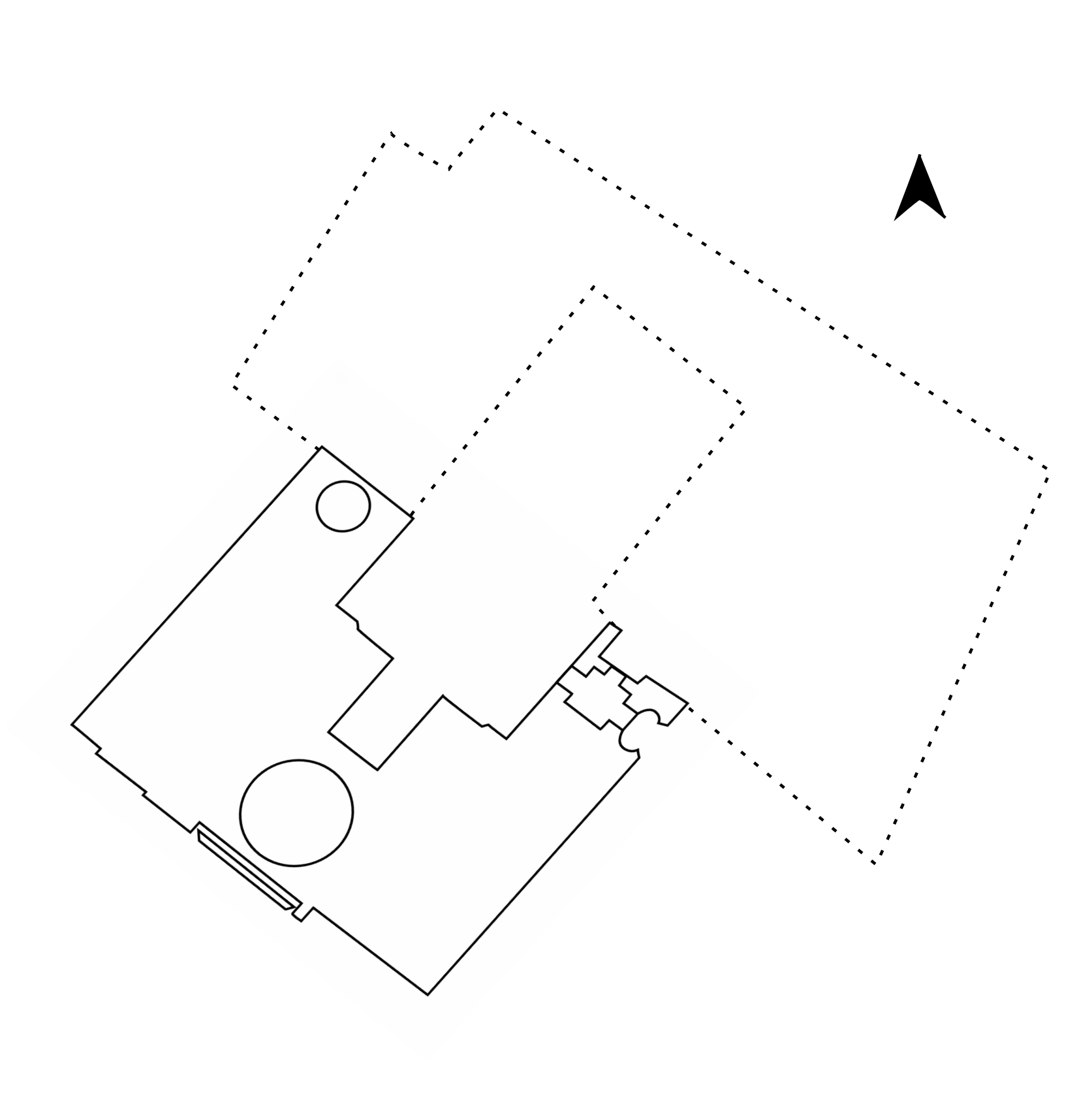
Plan of the Friday Mosque, Yazd. (straight line:ancient, dotted line:modern)
