= Jahan Shah =

- Padishah-i Iran (transl. Great King/Emperor of Iran)
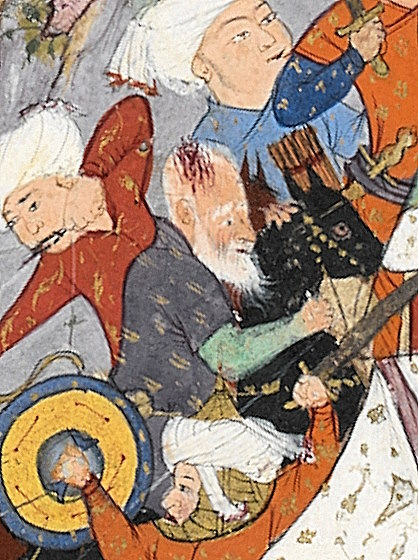
- Jahan Shah escaping under escort (detail), 1599

Sultan of Qara Qoyunlu
- Reign: 1438–1467
- Coronation: 19 April 1438
- Predecessor: Qara Iskander
- Successor: Hasan Ali
- Born: 1397 or 1405; Khoy or Mardin
- Died: 30 October or 11 November 1467 (aged 69–70 or 61–62); Near Bingöl
- Burial: Blue Mosque, Tabriz, Iran
- Spouse: Khatun Jan Baygum
- Issue: Pir Budaq; Hasan Ali; Mirza Yusuf
- Dynasty: Qara Qoyunlu
- Father: Qara Yusuf
- Religion: Islam (sectarian affiliation debated)

Muzaffar al-Din Jahan Shah ibn Yusuf (Azerbaijani: مظفرالدین جهان شاه ابن یوسف, romanized: Müzəffərəddin Cahan Şah ibn Yusif, Persian: جهان شاه; 1397 or 1405 – 30 October or 11 November 1467), also known as Abu al-Muzaffar Jahan Shah or Jihan Shah, was the leader of the Qara Qoyunlu tribal confederacy from 1438 to 1467. Jahan Shah wrote lyrical poems in Ajem Turkic, the predecessor of modern Azerbaijani, under the pen name Haqiqi.

During his reign, he expanded the Qara Qoyunlu's territory to its largest extent, including Eastern Anatolia, most of present-day Iraq, central Iran, and even eventually Kerman. He also conquered neighbouring states. He was one of the greatest rulers of the Qara Qoyunlu. He was also allegedly fond of drinking and entertainment. During his reign Jahan Shah had the Gökmedrese and Muzafferiye theological schools constructed in his capital city Tabriz.

== Early life ==
Jahan Shah was the son of Qara Yusuf. He had several brothers, some of whom ruled the Qara Qoyunlu before him: Pirbudag (r. 1411–1418), Ispend bin Yusuf, Iskander (r. 1421–1429, 1431–1436), Abu Said (r. 1430). Jahan Shah was sent to retake Soltaniyeh and Qazvin just before his father's death.

== During the reign of Qara Iskander ==
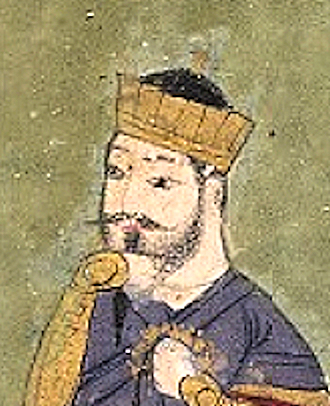
Contemporary portrait of Qara Iskander, brother of Jahan Shah, circa 1430

Around 1420 Jahan Shah was traditionally said to have married a daughter of Alexios IV of Trebizond and Theodora Kantakouzene. In this account, part of the agreement was that Alexius would continue paying to the Qara Qoyunlu the tribute that Trebizond had formerly paid to Timur. During the reign of his brother Qara Iskander (1420–36), as a potential rival to the throne, Jahan Shah's life was not safe and he took refuge with his other brother Ispend who was ruling Baghdad. In 1436 he obtained the help of the Timurid ruler Shah Rukh to defeat Qara Iskander and seize the throne for himself. Having been helped to power by Shah Rukh he ruled at first as a vassal of the Timurids. He was also adopted by Goharshad Begum and crowned on 19 April 1438, along with taking the epithet "Muzaffar al-Din".

== Campaigns against Georgia ==
In 1440, King Alexander I of Georgia refused to pay tribute to Jahan Shah. In March Jahan Shah responded by invading Georgia with 20,000 troops, destroyed the city of Samshvilde and sacked Tbilisi before returning to Tabriz. He was accompanied by Shaykh Ibrahim, father of future Shaykh Junayd. He also mounted a second military expedition against Georgia in 1444. His forces met those of Alexander's successor, King Vakhtang IV at Akhaltsikhe, but the fighting was inconclusive and Jahan Shah returned to Tabriz once more.

== Conquest of Baghdad ==
Jahan Shah's brother Ispend, who had ruled over Baghdad and its environs for twelve years, died in 1445 and he bequeathed the government of the state to his nephew Alvand Mirza since his son Fulad Mirza was too young at the time. However most of the emirs preferred Fulad. He decided to organise a military expedition against Baghdad with the backing of some of the emirs, who had sought refuge with him. After a siege of seven months, Baghdad was captured on 9 June 1446. He also appointed his nephews Alvand Mirza, Rustam, Tarkhan and Mahmud to jointly govern Mosul. He appointed his son Mirza Muhammad to govern Baghdad in his name.

== Reign ==
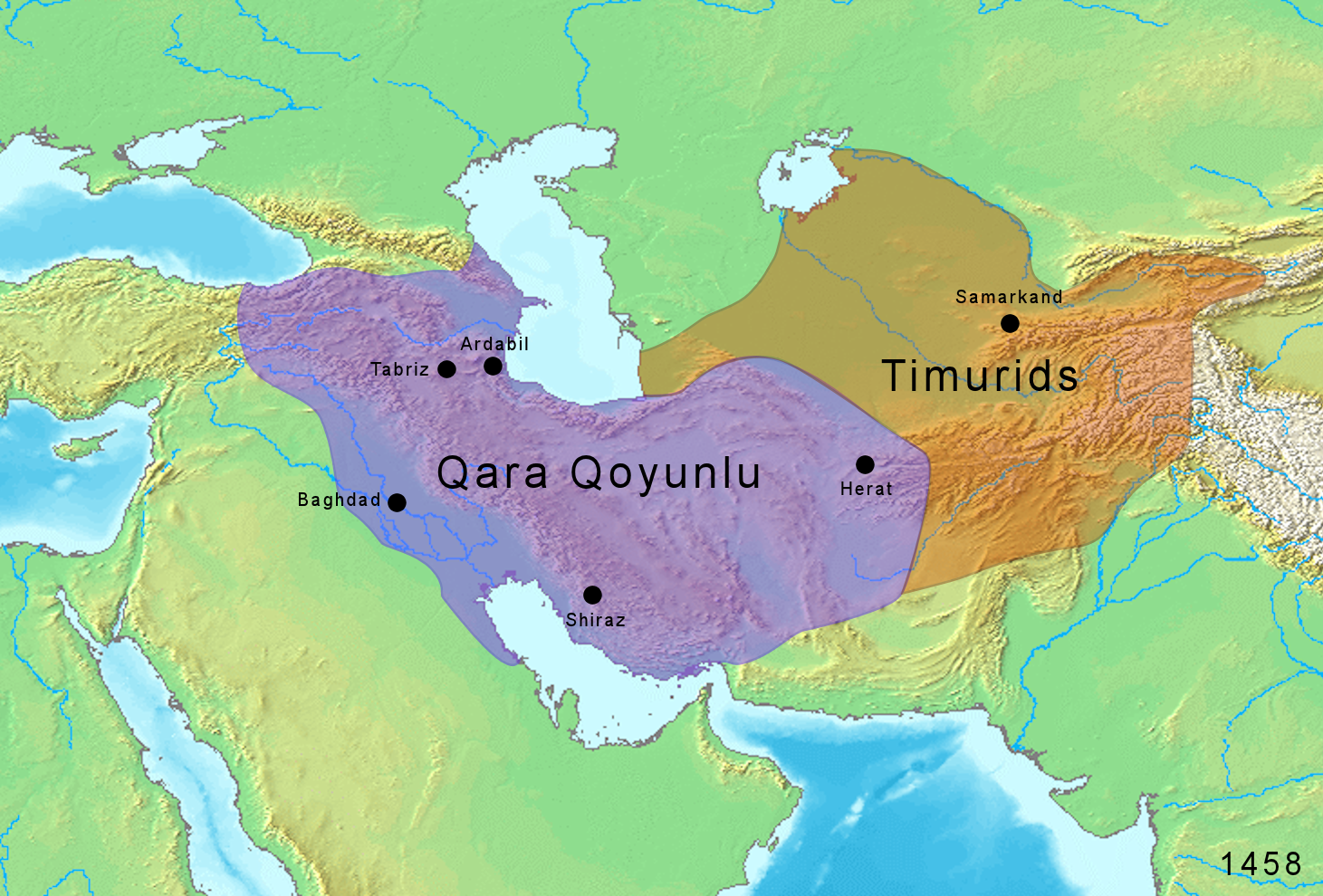
Maximum extent of Qara Qoyunlu territory in 1458 under Jahan Shah

Upon the death of the Timurid ruler Shah Rukh in 1447, Jahan Shah became an independent ruler of the Qara Qoyunlu, and started to use the titles of sultan and khan. At the same time, the Timurid Empire took advantage of the struggles among the Turkoman princes and captured the cities of Soltaniyeh and Qazvin. Peace was made when Sultan Muhammad bin Baysonqor married Jahan Shah's daughter Tutuq 'Ismat. However, he retook lands he lost from Mirza Babur.

In 1452–1453, Jahan Shah seized the opportunity of the death of Sultan Muhammad bin Baysonqor, Timurid Governor of Fars, to further expand East and South, taking Savah, Qumm, Isfahan, Shiraz and Yazd. He was seconded by his son Pīr Būdāq, who became governor of Shiraz.

In the summer of 1458, Jahan Shah advanced as far as Herat, leading to the occupation of Herat for six months, but finally had to turn back because of a revolt by his son Hasan Ali and also because Abu Said's march on Tabriz.

Hasan Ali was kept in Maku prison for a while for his rebellious nature. He was defeated in winter 1458. Pirbudag later rebelled and was joined by Hasan Ali in Fars. Pirbudag was spared after the intervention of his mother, Khatun Jan Baygum, and was replaced in Shiraz by Diyaʾ al-Din Yusuf, another son of Jahan Shah. Pirbudag was sent to govern Baghdad, while Qasim Beg was assigned to Kerman and Hasan Ali was imprisoned again. However, Pirbudag again rebelled, now controlling Baghdad. He was defeated in 1464 and was executed by Mirza Muhammad.

== Conflict with the Aq Qoyunlu ==
=== Conflict with Jahangir ===
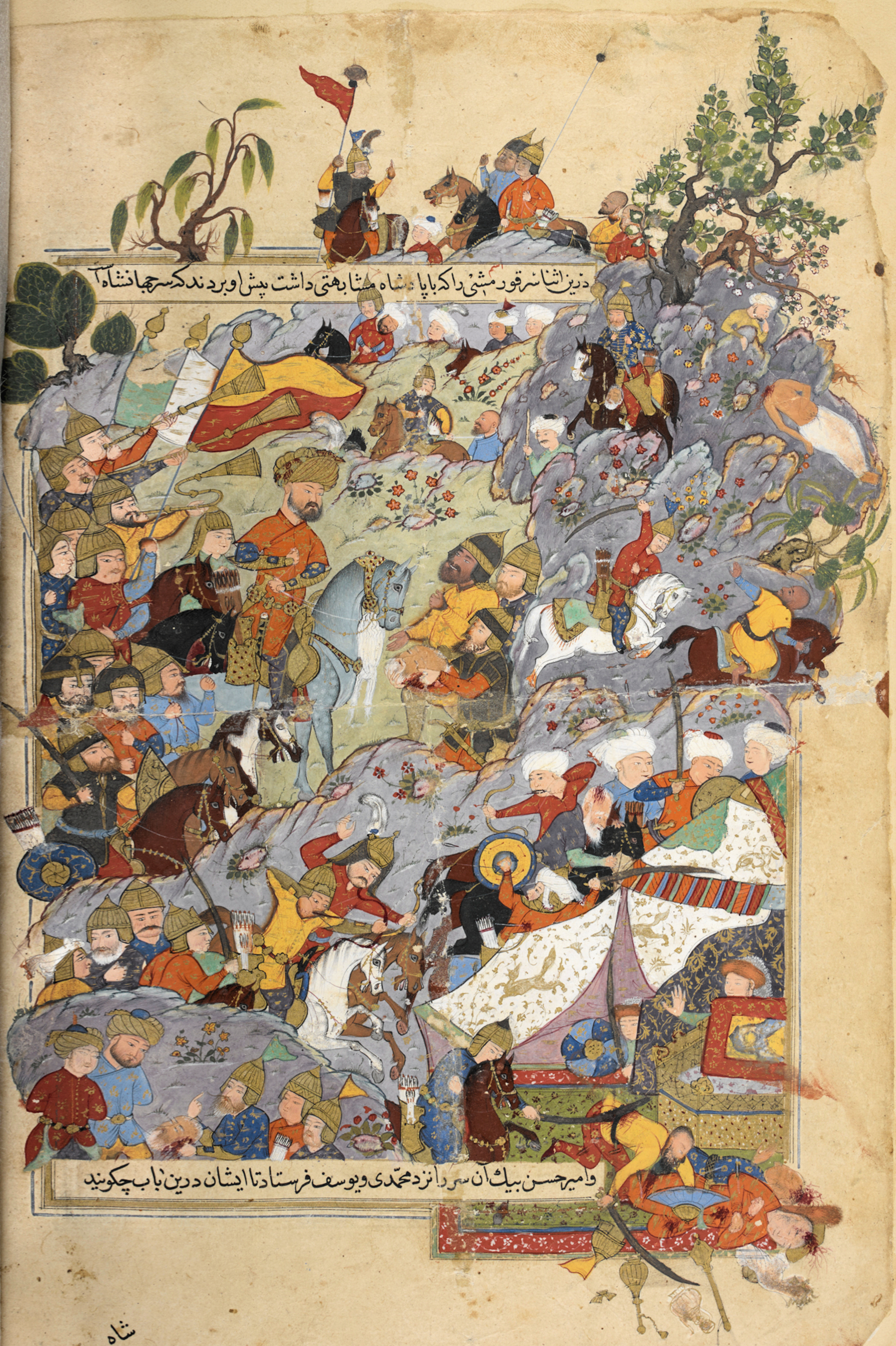
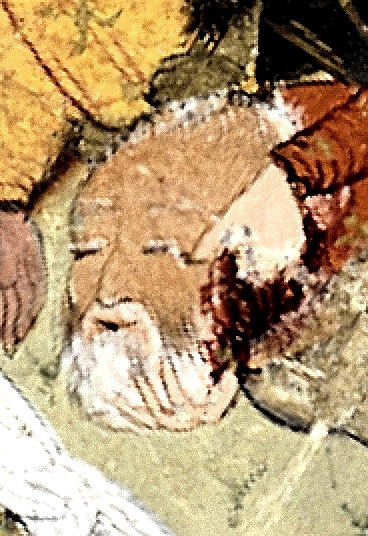
Battle of Chapakchur (1467). After a raid on the Qara Qoyunlu camp, a severed head, claimed to be Jahan Shah's, is being shown to Uzun Hasan. Folio 402v. Rawzat al-Safa, 1599, Turkey (British Library, Or. 5736)

From around 1447 Jahan Shah was involved in a struggle against the Ak Koyunlu who had always been sworn enemies of the Qara Qoyunlu. First of these battles happened when Alvand Mirza rebelled and fled to Jahangir, chief of Ak Koyunlu. Jahan Shah demanded his rebellious nephew, but Jahangir refused to hand him over. Jahan Shah invaded Erzincan and sent his commander – Rustem beg to subdue Jahangir. Hopeless Jahangir sent his mother Sara Khatun to Mamluk Egypt while Jahan Shah started to support his half-brother Sheikh Hasan. While Sheikh Hasan was killed by Uzun Hasan, brother of Jahangir; Jahan Shah hastened to offer peace to the Ak Koyunlu in return for their submission. Jahangir accepted and also wed his daughter to Mirza Muhammad.

=== Conflict with Uzun Hasan ===
Uzun Hasan did not acknowledge his elder brother's submission and rebelled against him, capturing Amid in 1457. Jahangir fled to Jahan Shah. Uzun Hasan was also supported by Safavids, their leader Shaykh Junayd being brother-in-law to Uzun Hasan. Junayd had earlier been displaced as head of the Safavid order, with Jahan Shah's backing, by his uncle Shaykh Jafar.

Jahan Shah set out from Tabriz with a great army on 16 May 1466, and came to the basin of Lake Van. While there, he was furious to learn that Uzun Hasan was raiding his lands with 12,000 cavalry. Meanwhile, Uzun Hasan, suspecting that Jahan Shah was planning to attack him, had carefully guarded the mountain passes. Envoys went back and forth between them, but because of Jahan Shah's heavy demands, an agreement could not be reached. Having advanced as far as Muş, Jahan Shah had to postpone his attack because of the onset of winter. As his troops began to complain, he decided to withdraw to a winter residence. Uzun Hasan caught his army by surprise and totally defeated them in a sudden attack. Mirza Yusuf and Mirza Muhammad were captured on 30 October or 11 November 1467 at the Battle of Chapakchur. Jahan Shah was killed in battle while fleeing, and with his death the great era of Qara Qoyunlu history came to an end. He was succeeded by his son Hasan Ali. Jahan Shah was buried in the southern part of the Blue Mosque, Tabriz.

== Legacy ==
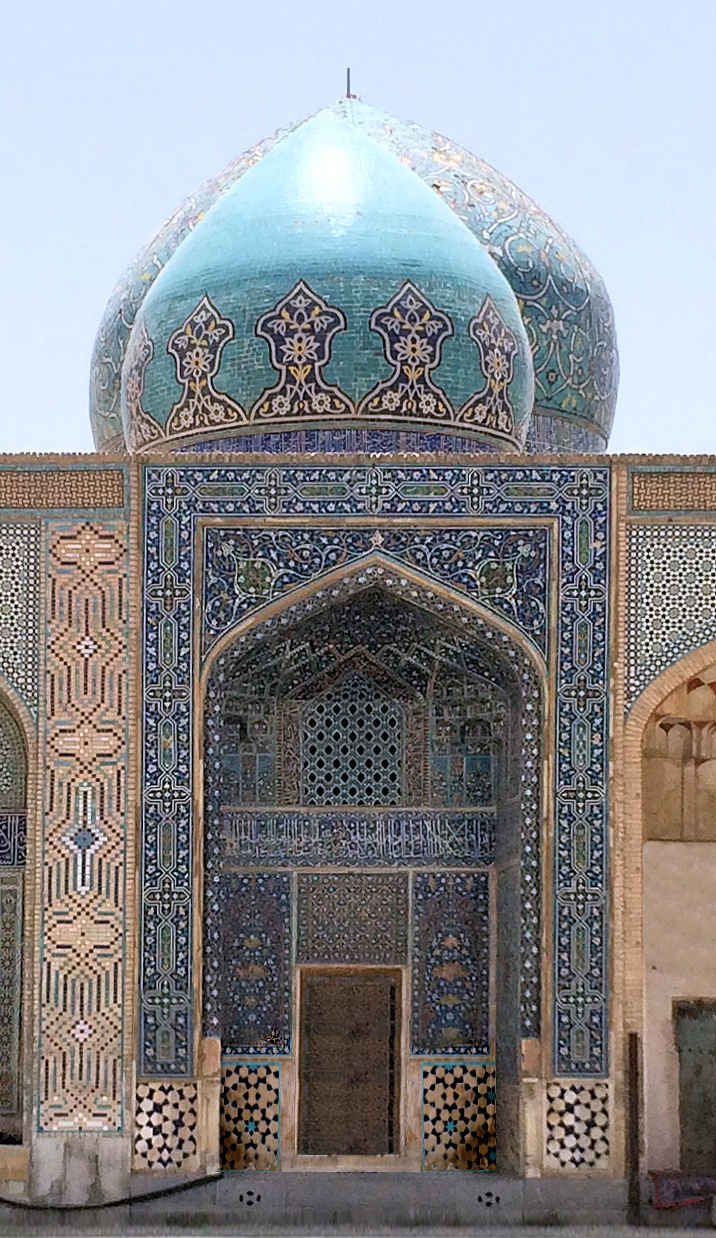
Northern iwan of Darb-e Imam, Isfahan, 1453

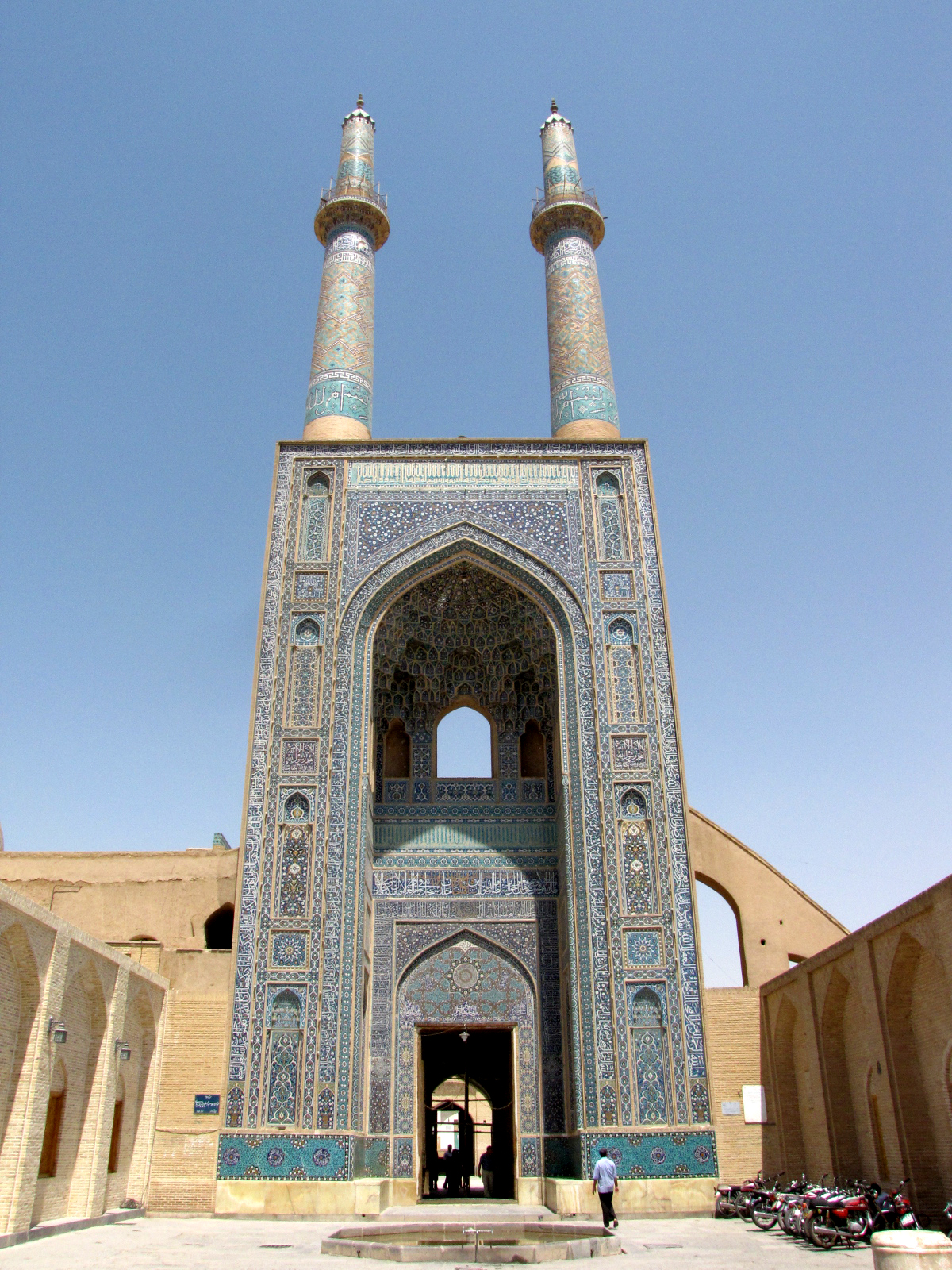
Eastern iwan of the Jameh Mosque of Yazd, 1457

In the year 1462, Abd al-Razzaq described Jahan-shah's rule in the following terms: "Owing to the benevolent administration (husn-i 'inayat va lutf-i atifat) of Mirza Jahan-shah, Azarbaijan was a highly thriving state. That well-meaning sovereign was anxious to practice justice, to secure prosperity of the country, and to treat his subjects honourably. The capital, Tabriz, by its numerous population and the prevalence of tranquility, emulated Egypt (misr-i jami). The rumours of the good behaviour of that felicitous king spread throughout the world. The inhabitants of his God-protected kingdom, indifferent to the arrows of events, enjoyed peace".

Jahan Shah, along with being a poet, promoted culture, learning and architecture. Using the pseudonym Haqiqi, Jahan Shah wrote poetry in Azerbaijani Turkic and Persian. In 1447 a daughter of Jahan Shah married Na'im al-Din Ni'matullah II, a fifth-generation descendant of the famous mystic Shah Nimatullah Vali.

=== Architecture ===
Jahan Shah is known for several architectural contributions through western Iran. The Northern Iwan of Darb-e Imam is attributed to him. He commissioned and dedicated the monument in 1453, two years after conquering the city. The gate is considered as "a masterpiece of tile decoration", and "among the finest specimens of such work in Persia". It has a monumental inscription in Persian recording the rule of Jahanshah and the local governorship of his son Muhammad: "When the ruler of the greatest domain, lord of the mightiest realm, and sovereign protector of the world Abu'l-Moẓaffar Mīrzāda Jahānšāh, may God perpetuate his stewardship, entrusted the government of this province to the care and direction of the prince, the support of the pillars of the religion of Moḥammad Abu'l-Fatḥ Moḥammadī...".

Jahanshah is also known for renovation work on the Eastern entrance iwan of the Jameh Mosque of Yazd in 1457. The portal has a central dedication in the name of Jahanshah: "the structure of this lofty arch (taf) was restored during the reign of . . . Abu'l-Muzaffar Sultan Jahanshah, Nizam al Dawlah wa'l-Din al-Hajj Qanbar, in Dhu'l-Hijjah 861." It is thought that the contribution was specifically related to the muqarnas of the portal.

The Blue Mosque in Tabriz was started through a foundation established by the wife of Jahanshah, Khatun Jan Baygum. The mosque was completed in 1465, but the mausoleum extension south of the mosque was completed later during the reign of the Āq Qoyunlu, into the 1480s CE.

== Family ==
He was married several times. Khatun Jan Baygum, daughter of Tajuddin Rajab bin Afridun, is named as his wife in the Sarih al-Milk waqf material. Hasan Ali's mother was another, unnamed wife; Khatun Jan is described in the chronicles as Hasan Ali's stepmother. A tradition also attributes to Jahan Shah a marriage to a daughter of Alexios IV of Trebizond and Theodora Kantakouzene, although Kuršanskis treats the identification as uncertain.

=== Sons ===
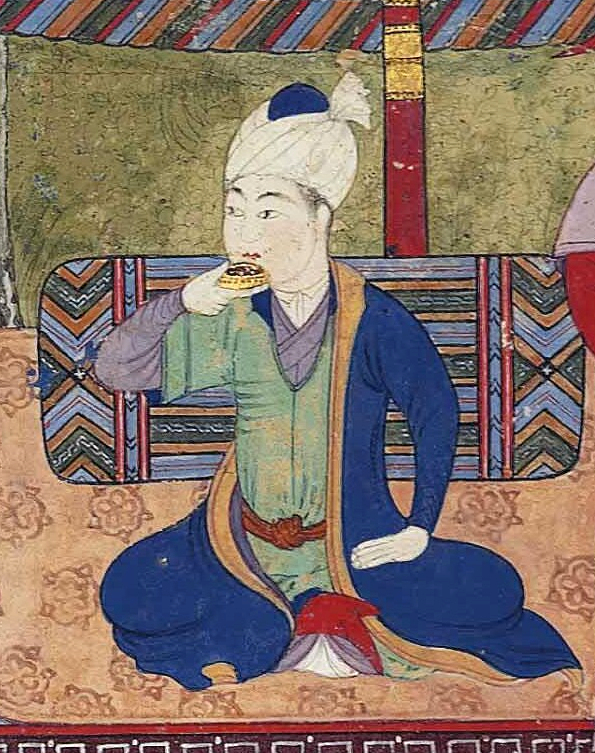
Contemporary depiction of Pir Budaq, son of Jahan Shah, as Governor of Shiraz. Shiraz miniature, c. 1455–1460

- Pirbudag – governor of Isfahan and Fars, then Baghdad. Killed by Mirza Muhammad.
- Hasan Ali – succeeded his father.
- Muhammadi Mirza (also Mirza Muhammad) – son-in-law to Jahangir Beg, captured at the Battle of Chapakchur in 1467 and executed.
- Mirza Yusuf – captured at the Battle of Chapakchur in 1467 and blinded. Executed by Ughurlu Muhammad on 22 October 1469.
- Abu'l-Qasim Mirza (Qasim Beg)
- Farrukhzad Mirza
- Diyaʾ al-Din Yusuf – governor of Shiraz from 1460 to 1464; he was succeeded there by Mirza Yusuf.

=== Daughters ===
- Saliha Khatun
- Habiba Khatun
- Dawlat Sultan – named in a 1471 waqf record as the sister of Mirza Yusuf.
- Tutuq 'Ismat, married to Sultan Muhammad, Timurid ruler
- An unnamed daughter married Na'im al-Din ibn Habib al-Din ibn Burhan al-Din ibn Ni'matullah, a descendant of Nimatullah Vali.

== Sources ==
- Minorsky, V. (1954). "Jihān-Shāh Qara-Qoyunlu and His Poetry (Turkmenica, 9)". Bulletin of the School of Oriental and African Studies. 16 (2): 271–97. doi:10.1017/s0041977x00105981. JSTOR 609169. S2CID 154352923.
- Sümer, F. (1997). "Kara Koyunlu". In van Donzel, E.; Lewis, B.; Pellat, C.; Bosworth, C.E. (eds.). The Encyclopaedia of Islam. Vol. IV (2nd ed.). Brill. pp. 584–588.

Preceded by Qara Iskander	Sultan of Qara Qoyunlu; 1438–67	Succeeded by Hasan Ali
