= Battle of Chapakchur =

Last battle of Qaraqoyunlu–Aqqoyunlu War

Battle of Chapakchur Sancaq Döyüşü
- Part of Qara Qoyunlu–Aq Qoyunlu Wars
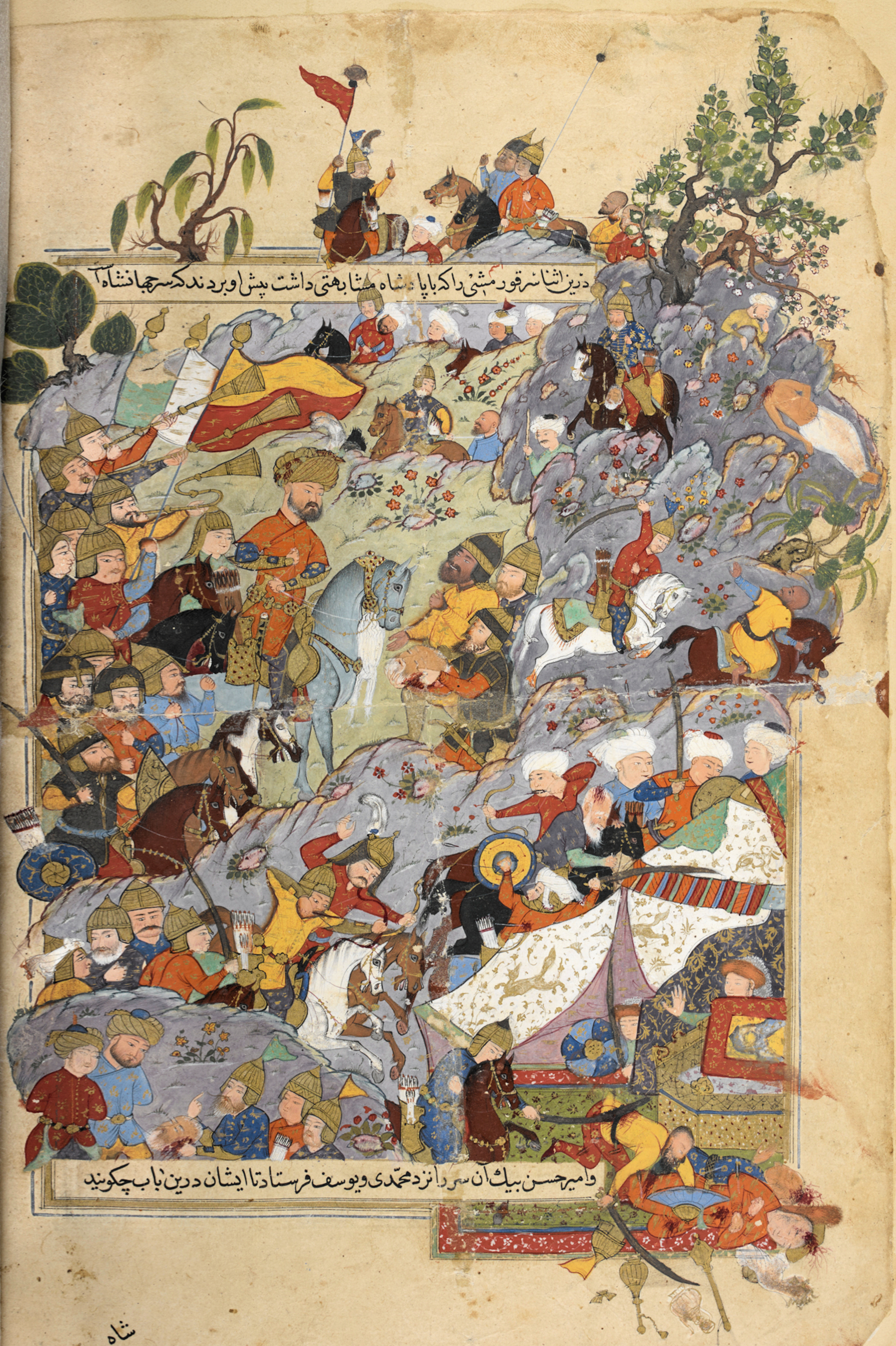
- Battle of Chapakchur (1467). A severed head, claimed to be Jahānshāh's, is being shown to Uzun Hasan. Folio 402v. Rawzat al-Safa, 1599, Turkey (British Library, Or. 5736)
Date	October 30 (or November 11), 1467.
Location	Near the Sanjak of Çapakçur, now known as Bingöl Province in eastern Turkey.
Result	Aq Qoyunlu victory; Decline of Qara Qoyunlu

Belligerents
Aq Qoyunlu	Qara Qoyunlu

Commanders and leaders
Uzun Hasan (WIA)	Jahan Shah †; Muhammedi Mirza †; Pirzad Beg (POW); Rüstem Beg (POW); İskender Beg (POW); Kılıç Arslan Beg (POW); Shah Veli Beg (POW); Yusuf Mirza (POW)

Strength
10,000	30,000

Casualties and losses
Unknown, less	5,000 killed

The Battle of Chapakchur (Turkish:Sancak Muharebesi; Azerbaijani:Səncəq döyüşü), also Battle of Muş, was a decisive battle fought between Qara Qoyunlu (Black Sheep Turkomen) under the leadership of Jahan Shah and Aq Qoyunlu (White Sheep Turkomen) under the leadership of Uzun Hasan. Jahan Shah was defeated by Uzun Hasan in a battle near the sanjak of Çapakçur in present-day eastern Turkey on October 30 (or November 11), 1467.

== Battle of Manifest ==
The conflict between Qara Qoyunlu and Aq Qoyunlu had reached its zenith under the leadership of the former group named Jahan Shah and latter group named Uzun Hassan. Aq Qoyunlu and Qara qoyunlu had been vying for power and regional supremacy for most of the 14th century and 15th century. Both groups were Turkoman. Qara qoyunlu were vassals of the Jalayirid dynasty in Baghdad and Tabriz from about 1375, when the leader of their leading tribe, ruled over Mosul. Aq Qoyunlu was brought to the region by the invasions of Timur the Lame and Qara Qoyunlu were uprooted from power. However, after the death of Timur, they returned and hastened the downfall of the Jalayirids whom they had once served.

During Jahan Shah's reign the Qara Qoyunlu's territory reached its largest extent, including huge swaths of land in Anatolia, most of present-day Iraq, central Iran, and even eventually Kerman. Uzun Hasan, meanwhile, was restricted initially to Diyarbakir but gradually expanded his territory in Anatolia. After clever diplomacy and regional alliances he managed to stave off the Ottoman Turks and even fought several battles against Qara qoyunlu defeating Jahan Shah on the river Tigris in May 1457. Uzun Hasan avoided all out war with the Ottoman Empire by allowing them to conquer his ally Empire of Trebizond, while he consolidated his power and prepared for the defense of his territory. It was during this time that Jahan Shah wanted to defeat the Aq Qoyunlu ruler Uzun Hasan and make him his vassal. So with that in mind he secured his eastern borders with a peace treaty with the Timurid leader of Samarkand, Abu Sa'id Mirza and then invaded Aq Qoyunlu territory to his west.

== Battle ==
Jahan Shah set out from Tabriz with a great army on May 16, 1466, and came to the basin of Lake Van. While there, he was furious to learn that Uzun Hassan was raiding his lands with 12,000 cavalry. Meanwhile, Uzun Hassan, worried that Jahan Shah was planning to attack him, had carefully guarded the mountain passes. Envoys went back and forth between them, but because of Jahan Shah's heavy demands, an agreement could not be reached. Having advanced as far as Muş, Jahan Shah had to postpone his attack because of the onset of winter. As his troops began to mutiny, he decided to withdraw to a winter residence.

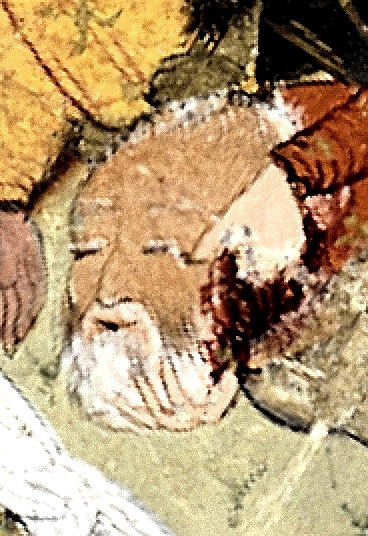
Purported severed head of Jahan Shah after the 1467 Battle of Chapakchur. Folio 402v. Rawzat al-Safa, 1599, Turkey (British Library, Or. 5736)

On November 10th in the afternoon (or possibly October 30 or November 11), Uzun Hassan caught Jahanshah army of about 6,000 men by surprise, as Jahanshah was asleep in his tent. Jahanshah's army was totally defeated. Jahan Shah was killed by an unknown assailant while trying to flee, and was decapitated. With his death the era of Qara Qoyunlu history came to an end.

Apart from the execution of Sultan Jahan Shah, many people such as his sons Prince Mirza Muhammedi and Yusuf Mirza, as well as Pirzad Beg, Şehsuvaroğlu İskender Beg, Kılıç Arslan Beg, Shah Veli Beg were also captured. In this way, approximately 5,000 people, including Mirza Muhammadi, who constituted the main army force under the rule of Sultan Jahan Shah's sons Mirza Muhammadi and Yusuf Mirza, were destroyed in the war. Prince Mirza Muhammedi was executed, and Yusuf Mirza was later blinded.

The decapitated body of Jahanshah was recovered on the battlefield, but there are various accounts about the fate of his head, which may never have been found, or may have been sent as a trophy to the Timurid court according to some sources, or to the Mamluk court in Cairo.
