= List of wars: 1000–1499 =

This is a list of wars that began between 1000 and 1499 (last war ended in 1519). Other wars can be found in the historical lists of wars and the list of wars extended by diplomatic irregularity.

== 1000–1099 ==
Start	Finish	Name of conflict	Belligerents	
Start	Finish	Name of conflict	Victorious party (if applicable)	Defeated party (if applicable)
1000	1139	Norman conquest of southern Italy	County of Apulia; County of Aversa; Kingdom of Sicily (1130–1139)	Principality of Salerno; Principality of Benevento; Principality of Capua; Republic of Amalfi; Duchy of Naples
1000	1000	Siege of Lastovo	Republic of Venice	Kingdom of Croatia; Narentines
1001	1001	Battle of Peshawar	Ghaznavids	Hindu Shahis
1003	1003	Henry of Schweinfurt's Rebellion	Henry II	Henry of Schweinfurt
1003	1018	German–Polish War	Kingdom of Poland	Holy Roman Empire
1007	1007	Battle of Chach	Ghaznavids	Hindu Shahis
c. 1007	c. 1008	Battle at Herdaler	Kingdom of Norway	Finnish tribes
1008	1008	Hungarian–Ahtum War	Kingdom of Hungary	Voivodeship of Ahtum
1009	1031	Fitna of al-Andalus	Hammudid dynasty Rebels	Caliphate of Córdoba
1010	1011	Second conflict in the Goryeo–Khitan War	Liao dynasty	Goryeo
1014	1014	Battle of Clontarf	High King of Ireland	Leinster; Dublin; Vikings of Orkney and Man
1014	1204	Byzantine–Georgian wars	Byzantine Empire	Kingdom of Georgia
1015	1016	Cnut the Great's conquest of England	Denmark Poland	England
1015	1016	Mujahid's invasion of Sardinia	Republic of Pisa; Republic of Genoa; Sardinian judicati	Taifa of Dénia
1016	1016	Battle of Pontlevoy	County of Anjou; County of Maine	County of Blois
1018	1018	Bolesław I's intervention in the Kievan succession crisis	Kievan Rus' allied to Poland and Hungary	Kievan Rus' allied to Yaroslav I
1018	1018	Battle of Vlaardingen	West Frisia	Holy Roman Empire
1018	1018	Battle of Carham	Kingdom of Scotland; Kingdom of Strathclyde	Kingdom of England
1018	1019	Third conflict in the Goryeo–Khitan War	Goryeo	Liao dynasty
1019	1019	Toi invasion	Goryeo; Dazaifu	Jurchen pirates
1019	1021	Chola Expedition of the Ganges	Chola Empire	Eastern Chalukyas; Pala Empire; Odda; Kalinga
1025	1025	Chola invasion of Srivijaya	Chola Empire	Srivijaya
1030	1030	Battle of Azaz	Mirdasid Emirate of Aleppo	Byzantine Empire
1030	1030	Battle of Stiklestad	Peasant Army	Kingdom of Norway
1033	1058	Civil War in Georgia	Kingdom of Georgia	Byzantine Empire; Duchy of Anakopia; Duchy of Kldekari; Duchy of Klarjeti
1035	1042	Stefan Vojislav's Uprising	Duklja	Byzantine Empire
1040	1040	Battle of Dandanaqan	Seljuk Turks	Ghaznavid Empire
1040	1041	Uprising of Peter Delyan	Byzantine Empire	Bulgarian rebels
1040	1041	Bohemian-German war	Holy Roman Empire	Duchy of Bohemia
1040	1189	Byzantine–Norman wars	Byzantine Empire; Republic of Venice; Holy Roman Empire	Kingdom of Sicily; Kingdom of France; Lombard duchies Papal States; Serbs (Duklja and Raška)
1043	1043	Rus'–Byzantine War	Byzantine Empire	Kievan Rus'
1046	1046	Vata pagan uprising	Peter Orseolo	Hungarian pagans
1046	1243	Byzantine–Seljuk wars	Great Seljuq Empire (1048–1092); Sultanate of Rum (1077–1308)	Byzantine Empire, Empire of Nicaea (1204–1261); Empire of Trebizond (1204–1308); Crusader states
1048	1213	Georgian–Seljuk wars	Kingdom of Georgia (1089–1125), Georgian Empire (1184–1213)	Great Seljuk Empire; Atabegs of Azerbaijan; Sultanate of Rum
1051	1063	Former Nine Years' War	Japan; Minamoto no Yoriyoshi	Abe clan
1052	1052	Battle of Haydaran	Banu Hilal	Zirid dynasty
1061	1091	Norman conquest of Sicily	County of Apulia; County of Sicily (1071–1091)	Emirate of Sicily; Zirids (1063–1068)
1064	1064	Crusade of Barbastro	Kingdom of Aragon; County of Urgell; Duchy of Aquitaine; Papal States	Taifa of Lérida
1064	1066	Breton–Norman war	Kingdom of England; Duchy of Normandy	Duchy of Brittany
1065	1067	War of the Three Sanchos	Kingdom of Castile	Kingdom of Navarre; Kingdom of Aragon
1066	1066	Battle of Stamford Bridge	Kingdom of England	Norway; Earldom of Orkney; English rebels
1066	1088	Norman Conquest of England	Normandy	Kingdom of England
1066	1165	Norman invasion of Wales	Welsh kingdoms	Normandy
1066	1067	Battle on the Nemiga River	Principality of Kiev; Principality of Chernigov; Principality of Pereiaslavl'	Principality of Polotsk
1068	1068	Battle of the Alta River	Cumans	Principality of Kiev; Principality of Chernigov; Principality of Pereiaslavl'
1068	1068	Battle of Kerlés	Kingdom of Hungary	Pechenegs; Ouzes
1068	1069	Kiev uprising	Kievan Rus'	Veche of kiev
1071	1071	Battle of Pedroso	Kingdom of Galicia	County of Portugal
1072	1072	Battle of Golpejera	Kingdom of Castille	Kingdom of León
1072	1073	Uprising of Georgi Voyteh	Byzantine Empire	Bulgarian rebels
1073	1073	Battle of Kerj Abu Dulaf	Seljuk Empire	Kerman Seljuk Sultanate
1073	1075	Saxon Rebellion	Holy Roman Empire	Duchy of Saxony
1075	1077	Lý–Song War	Lý dynasty (Indecisive result)	Song dynasty
1075	1075	Revolt of the Earls	Normandy	English rebels
1075	1082	Varendra rebellion	Varendra	Pala Empire
1077	1088	Great Saxon Revolt	Holy Roman Empire	Saxon nobility
1083	1089	Gosannen War	Minamoto clan	Kiyohara clan
1088	1088	Rebellion of 1088		
1090	1194	Nizari–Seljuk conflicts	Nizari Ismaili state	Seljuk Empire; Abbasid Caliphate sunni Townspeople; Fatimid Caliphate; Ayyubid Sultanate; Principality of Antioch; Kingdom of Jerusalem; County of Tripoli; Knights Templar; Knights Hospitaller
1096	1099	First Crusade; Part of the Crusades	Crusaders; Kingdom of France; County of Auvergne; Counts of Blois; County of Toulouse; County of Boulogne; Duchy of Burgundy; County of Flanders; Duchy of Normandy; Diocese of Le Puy-en-Velay; Duchy of Brittany; Vermandois; Holy Roman Empire; Republic of Genoa; County of Sicily; Principality of Taranto; County of Apulia and Calabria; Eastern Christian Allies; Byzantine Empire; Armenian Kingdom of Cilicia	Muslim forces Fatimid Caliphate; Seljuk Empire; Sultanate of Rum; Danishmendids; Seljuk Emirate of Aleppo; Seljuk Emirate of Damascus; Abbasid Caliphate
1097	1097	Chola invasion of Kalinga	Chola Empire	Kalinga

== 1100–1199 ==
Start	Finish	Name of Conflict	Belligerents	
Start	Finish	Name of Conflict	Victorious party (if applicable)	Defeated party (if applicable)
1101	1101	Crusade of 1101; Part of the Crusades	Sultanate of Rum; Danishmends; Seljuk Emirate of Aleppo	Crusaders; Kingdom of France; Duchy of Burgundy; County of Blois; County of Nevers; County of Vermandois; Duchy of Aquitaine; Holy Roman Empire; County of Burgundy; Duchy of Bavaria; Margraviate of Austria; Republic of Genoa; Byzantine Empire; Papal States
1101	1101	Battle of Ramla; Part of the Crusades	Kingdom of Jerusalem	Fatimid Caliphate
1102	1102	Battle of Ramla; Part of the Crusades	Fatimids of Egypt	Kingdom of Jerusalem
1107	1110	Norwegian Crusade; Part of the Crusades	Kingdom of Norway; Kingdom of Jerusalem; Republic of Venice	Muslim Kingdoms; Almoravids; Taifa of Majorca; Fatimid Caliphate
1107	1119	Muhammad Tapar's anti-Nizari campaign	Seljuq Empire	Nizari Ismaili state
1110	1110	Chola invasion of Kalinga	Chola Empire	Kalinga
1113	1115	Balearic Islands expedition Part of the Crusades	Republic of Pisa; Catalan counties County of Provence; Giudicato of Torres; Papal States	Taifa of Majorca; Almoravids
1121	1121	Battle of Didgori	Kingdom of Georgia	Seljuk Empire; Artuqids; Beylik of Dilmaç; Banu Mazyad; Shaddadids; Emirate of Tbilisi; Sultanate of Rum
1122	1124	Venetian Crusade; Part of the Crusades	Republic of Venice; Kingdom of Jerusalem; County of Tripoli	Fatimid Caliphate; Seljuqs
1123	1123	Kalmare ledung Part of the Crusades	Kingdom of Norway	Swedish Pagans
1125	1208	Jurchen campaigns against the Song dynasty	Jin dynasty	Song dynasty
1127	1129	Byzantine–Hungarian War	Byzantine Empire	Kingdom of Hungary; Grand Principality of Serbia
1130	1240	Civil war era in Norway	Pretenders	Aristocrates
1131	1157	Danish Civil Wars		
1135	1154	The Anarchy	Stephen of Blois	Empress Matilda; Henry Plantagenet
1144	1162	Baussenque Wars	House of Barcelona	House of Baux
1145	1149	Second Crusade; Part of the Crusades	Sultanate of Rûm; Almoravid Dynasty; Zengid Dynasty; Fatimid Caliphate	Kingdom of Jerusalem; Kingdom of France; Holy Roman Empire; Kingdom of Portugal; Kingdom of Castile; County of Barcelona; Kingdom of León; Byzantine Empire; Kingdom of Sicily; Kingdom of England
1147	1242	Northern Crusades; Part of the Crusades	Kingdom of Denmark; Kingdom of Sweden; Sword-Brothers; Teutonic Order	Estonians; Oeselians; Semigallians; Curonians; Latgallians; Selonians; Livonians; Prussians; Polabian Slavs
1153	1153	Battle of Sétif	Almohad Caliphate	Banu Hilal; Riyah
1156	1156	Hōgen Rebellion	Forces loyal to Emperor Go-Shirakawa	Forces loyal to Retired Emperor Sutoku
1159	1160	Heiji Rebellion	Taira clan; Shinzei	Minamoto clan; Fujiwara no Nobuyori
1169	1175	Norman invasion of Ireland	Duchy of Normandy	Ulster; Mide; Leinster; Munster; Connacht
1169	1177	Pandyan Civil War	Faction of Parakrama Pandyan II; Kingdom of Polonnaruwa	Faction of Kulasekhara; Chola dynasty
1171	1172	Byzantine–Venetian war	Byzantine Empire	Republic of Venice
1173	1174	Revolt of 1173–1174	English royalists	English rebels Kingdom of France; Kingdom of Scotland; County of Flanders; County of Boulogne; Duchy of Brittany
1177	1177	Battle of Montgisard; Part of the Crusades	Kingdom of Jerusalem	Ayyubid Dynasty
1179	1179	Battle of Loděnice	Soběslav II, Duke of Bohemia	Duchy of Bohemia; Frederick, Duke of Bohemia
1179	1179	Battle of Marj Ayyun; Part of the Crusades	Ayyubid Dynasty	Kingdom of Jerusalem; Knights Templar
1179	1179	Battle of Jacob's Ford; Part of the Crusades	Ayyubid Dynasty	Kingdom of Jerusalem
1180	1185	Genpei War	Minamoto clan (Yoritomo); Imperial Court	Taira clan Minamoto no Yoshinaka
1182	1182	Battle of Belvoir Castle; Part of the Crusades	Kingdom of Jerusalem	Ayyubid Dynasty
1183	1183	Battle of Al-Fule; Part of the Crusades	Kingdom of Jerusalem	Ayyubid Dynasty
1185	1204	Uprising of Asen and Peter	Bulgarian Empire	Byzantine Empire
1185	1185		Konrád II Ota	Frederick, Duke of Bohemia
1187	1187	Battle of Cresson; Part of the Crusades	Ayyubid Dynasty	Kingdom of Jerusalem
1187	1187	Battle of Hattin; Part of the Crusades	Ayyubid Dynasty	Kingdom of Jerusalem; County of Tripoli; Principality of Antioch
1187	1187	Siege of Jerusalem	Ayyubid Dynasty	Kingdom of Jerusalem
1189	1192	Third Crusade; Part of the Crusades	Kingdom of Jerusalem; Kingdom of England; Kingdom of France; Holy Roman Empire; Knights Templar; Kingdom of Sicily	Ayyubid Dynasty; Zengid Dynasty; Byzantine Empire
1191	1191	Conquest of Cyprus by Richard I	Kingdom of England	Isaac Komnenos of Cyprus
1197	1198	Crusade of 1197; Part of the Crusades	Holy Roman Empire	Ayyubid Dynasty
1198	1290	Livonian Crusade; Part of the Crusades	Sword-Brothers; Livonian Order; Kingdom of Denmark; Kingdom of Sweden	Finnic peoples; Livonians; Estonians; Oeselians; Baltic people; Latgallians; Selonians; Curonians; Semigallians

== 1200–1299 ==
Start	Finish	Name of Conflict	Belligerents	
Start	Finish	Name of Conflict	Victorious party (if applicable)	Defeated party (if applicable)
1201	1201	Kennin Rebellion	Kamakura shogunate	Jo clan
1201	1219	War of the Antiochene Succession	Forces of Bohemond IV of Antioch; Knights Templar; Ayyubid Emirate of Aleppo; Kingdom of Jerusalem; Sultanate of Rum	Forces of Raymond-Roupen of Antioch; Kingdom of Cilicia; Knights Hospitaller
1202	1204	Fourth Crusade; Part of the Crusades	Holy Roman Empire; Republic of Venice; Monferrat	Byzantine Empire
1204	1206	Intervention in Chaldia	Kingdom of Georgia	Empire of Trebizond
1202	1204	Anglo-Norman War	Kingdom of France; Duchy of Brittany; House of Lusignan	Kingdom of England
1203	1206	Loon War	Holland; Kingdom of England; House of Welf	Loon; France; Staufen; Flanders; Limburg; Brabant; Utrecht; Liège
1204	1261	Bulgarian–Latin wars	Bulgarian Empire	Latin Empire
1205	1245	War of the Galician Succession		Árpád dynasty Olgovichi; Piast dynasty
1206	1368	Mongol invasions and conquests	Mongol Empire	Western Xia; Jin dynasty Manchuria; Dali Kingdom; Khwarizmian Empire; Kara-Khitan Khanate; Song dynasty Kievan Rus'; Volga Bulgaria; Byzantine Empire; Kingdom of Poland; Kingdom of Hungary; Kingdom of Croatia; Kingdom of Serbia; Bulgarian Empire; Sultanate of Rûm; Empire of Trebizond; Crusader states Sukhothai Kingdom; Mamluk Sultanate; Abbasid Caliphate; Goryeo; Pagan Kingdom; Chăm Pa; Singhasari
1208	1209	Lombard Rebellion	Latin Empire; Kingdom of Thessalonica	Rebel barons
1209	1229	Albigensian Crusade; Part of the Crusades	Kingdom of France	Counts of Toulouse; Crown of Aragon
1211	1211	Welsh uprising of 1211	Kingdom of England	Llywelyn the Great
1213	1214	Anglo-French War	Kingdom of France	Kingdom of England
1214	1214	Battle of Bouvines	Kingdom of France	Welfs; County of Flanders; Kingdom of England; Boulogne
1215	1217	First Barons' War	Kingdom of England	Rebel Barons; Kingdom of France
1216	1222	War of the Succession of Champagne	County of Champagne; Kingdom of France; Holy Roman Empire; Duchy of Burgundy; County of Bar; Papal States	Local barons in the borderlands of Champagne, united under Erard of Brienne. Duchy of Lorraine
1217	1221	Fifth Crusade; Part of the Crusades	Ayyubid Dynasty	Latin Empire of Constantinople; Kingdom of Cyprus; Sultanate of Rûm; Holy Roman Empire; Archduchy of Austria; Knights Templar; Teutonic Order; Knights Hospitaller; Kingdom of Hungary; County of Holland; Kingdom of France; Papal States
1218	1218	Mongol conquest of the Qara Khitai	Mongol Empire	Qara Khitai
1221	1221	Jōkyū War	Kamakura Shogunate; Hōjō clan	Emperor Go-Toba
1221	1222	Battle of Genter	Kingdom of Tumapel	Kingdom of Kediri
1228	1229	Sixth Crusade; Part of the Crusades	Holy Roman Empire; Teutonic Knights	Kingdom of Cyprus; House of Ibelin; Ayyubid Dynasty
1228	1243	War of the Lombards	Kingdom of Cyprus; Anti-Imperial faction in the Kingdom of Jerusalem; Republic of Genoa; Knights Templar; Papacy	Holy Roman Empire; Pro-Imperial faction in the Kingdom of Jerusalem; Principality of Antioch and County of Tripoli; Republic of Pisa; Knights Hospitaller; Teutonic Knights
1230	1233	Friso-Drentic War	Bishopric of Utrecht; Frisians; Town of Groningen	Drenthe; Province of Groningen
1230	1333	Dernbacher Feud	Landgraviate of Hesse	House of Nassau
1233	1234	Stedinger Crusade; Part of the Crusades	Prince-Archbishopric of Bremen; Crusaders	Stedingers
1235	1242	Bosnian Crusade; Part of the Crusades	Kingdom of Hungary	Banate of Bosnia
1236	1238	First war against Swietopelk II	Duchy of Lubiszewo (1236); Mecklenburgian troops (1237–1238); Duchy of Białogarda (1237–1238); Duchy of Kuyavia (1238)	Duchy of Gdańsk
1239	1245	Teltow and Magdeburg Wars	Margraviate of Brandenburg	Margravate of Meissen
1240	1242	Livonian campaign against Rus'; Part of the Northern Crusades	Novgorod Republic; Vladimir-Suzdal	Livonian order
1242	1242	Saintonge War	Kingdom of France	Kingdom of England
1242	1247	Second war against Swietopelk II	Duchy of Gdańsk	State of the Teutonic Order; Duchy of Kuyavia
1242	1249	First Prussian Uprising	Teutonic Order	Old Prussians
1247	1264	War of the Thuringian Succession	Sophie of Thuringia	Henry III, Margrave of Meissen
1248	1250	Genoese occupation of Rhodes	Empire of Nicaea	Republic of Genoa; Principality of Achaea
1248	1254	Seventh Crusade; Part of the Crusades	Ayyubid Dynasty; Bahris	Kingdom of France; Knights Templar
1250	1250	Tumapel-Kediri war	Tumapel Kingdom	Kediri Kingdom
1251	1251	Shepherds' Crusade	Kingdom of France	Peasants
1252	1253	Third war against Swietopelk II	Duchy of Gdańsk	Duchy of Lubiszewo; State of the Teutonic Order
1256	1258	War of the Euboeote Succession	Principality of Achaea; Republic of Genoa	Republic of Venice; Lordship of Athens and Thebes; Triarchs of Negroponte; Lordship of Salona; Marquisate of Bodonitsa
1256	1270	War of Saint Sabas	Republic of Venice; Count of Jaffa; Knights Templar	Republic of Genoa; Philip of Monfort; John of Arsuf; Knights Hospitaller
1257	1259	Rebellion of Arbanon	Empire of Nicaea	Principality of Arbanon
1257	1259	Epirote–Nicaean conflict	Empire of Nicaea	Despotate of Epirus
1258	1258	First Mongol invasion of Vietnam	Đại Việt	Mongol Empire
1260	1264	Toluid Civil War	Kublai Khan	Ariq Böke
1260	1274	Great Prussian Uprising		
1260	1323	Mongol invasions of the Levant	Ilkhanate; Armenian Kingdom of Cilicia; Kingdom of Georgia; Principality of Antioch; County of Tripoli; Golden Horde of the Mongol Empire (1259–1264); Knights Templar	Mamluk Egypt Sultanate; Ayyubids; Golden Horde of the Mongol Empire (after 1264); Karamanid Rebels; Abbasid Caliphate
1262	1262	Berke–Hulagu war	Golden Horde	Ilkhanate
1262	1266	Scottish–Norwegian War	Kingdom of Scotland	Norway
1264	1265	Hungarian Civil War	Forces loyal to Stephen	Forces loyal to Béla IV
1264	1267	Second Barons' War	Pro-Monarchy Forces	Anti-Monarchy Barons
1266	1266	Battle of Benevento; Part of Guelphs and Ghibellines	Guelphs	Ghibellines
1268	1268	Mačva War	Kingdom of Hungary	Kingdom of Serbia
1268	1301	Kaidu–Kublai war	Chagatai Khanate; Golden Horde	Yuan dynasty Ilkhanate
1269	1269	Catalan Crusade		
1269	1271	Civil war in Pomerelia	Duchy of Świecie; Margraviate of Brandenburg; Duchy of Greater Poland (1270–1271)	Duchy of Gdańsk; Duchy of Lubiszewo (1269)
1270	1270	Kelana Bhayangkara rebellion	Singhasari Kingdom	Kelana Bhayangkara forces
1270	1270	Eighth Crusade; Part of the Crusades	Hafsids	Kingdom of France; Kingdom of Sicily; Kingdom of Navarre
1270	1273	Sambyeolcho Rebellion	Goryeo; Yuan dynasty	Sambyeolcho Army
1271	1272	Ninth Crusade; Part of the Crusades	Mamluk Sultanate	Anjou; Kingdom of Cyprus; Principality of Antioch; Kingdom of England; Ilkhanate
1272	1278	War of the Cow		
1274	1281	Mongol invasions of Japan	Kamakura Shogunate	Mongol Empire; Goryeo; Yuan dynasty
1275	1275	Manx revolt of 1275	Kingdom of Scotland	Kingdom of Mann
1275	1283	Pamalayu Expedition	Singhasari Kingdom	Melayu Kingdom
1276	1278	6000-mark war	Denmark	Sweden
1277	1280	Uprising of Ivaylo	Bulgarian nobility Byzantine Empire; Golden Horde	Peasants under Ivaylo of Bulgaria
1277	1283	Conquest of Wales by Edward I	Kingdom of England	Principality of Wales
1277	1288	First Mongol invasion of Burma	Yuan dynasty	Pagan Kingdom
1280	1280	Mahisa Rangka rebellion	Singhasari Kingdom	Mahisa Rangka forces
1280	1478	Genoese–Mongol Wars	Republic of Genoa	Golden Horde; Great Horde; Crimean Khanate
1282	1302	War of the Sicilian Vespers	Crown of Aragon; Kingdom of Trinacria	Kingdom of Naples; Kingdom of France; Kingdom of Majorca
1283	1289	War of the Limburg Succession	Duchy of Brabant; County of Berg; County of Mark; County of Loon; County of Jülich; County of Tecklenburg; County of Waldeck	Electorate of Cologne; County of Guelders; County of Luxembourg; Lordship of Ligny; County of Nassau
1284	1284	Pabali Expedition	Singhasari Kingdom	Bali Kingdom
1285	1285	Southwest Borneo Expedition	Singhasari Kingdom	Tanjungpura Kingdom
1285	1285	Second Mongol invasion of Vietnam	Đại Việt	Mongol Empire
1287	1288	Third Mongol invasion of Vietnam	Đại Việt	Mongol Empire
1289	1296	War of the Outlaws	Norway; Danish outlaws	Denmark
1292	1292	Jayakatwang rebellion	Jayakatwang forces	Singhasari Kingdom
1292	1293	Mongol invasion of Java	Majapahit Empire	Yuan dynasty Kediri Kingdom
1294	1294	Majapahit invasion of Sambas	Majapahit Empire	Sambas Kingdom
1294	1294	Battle of Red Ford	Clan MacDougall	Clan Campbell
1294	1303	Gascon War	Kingdom of France	Kingdom of England
1295	1295	Ranggalawe rebellion	Majapahit Empire	Ranggalawe forces
1295	1299	War of Curzola	Republic of Venice	Republic of Genoa; Byzantine Empire (1295)
1296	1302	Byzantine–Venetian War	Republic of Venice	Byzantine Empire
1296	1328	First War of Scottish Independence	Kingdom of Scotland	Kingdom of England
1297	1305	Franco-Flemish War	Kingdom of France	County of Flanders

== 1300–1399 ==
Start	Finish	Name of Conflict	Belligerents	
Start	Finish	Name of Conflict	Victorious party (if applicable)	Defeated party (if applicable)
1300	1301	Second Mongol invasion of Burma	Myinsaing Kingdom	Yuan dynasty
1300	1300	Lembu Sora rebellion	Majapahit Empire	Lembu Sora forces
1302	1302	Battle of Bapheus	Ottoman Empire	Byzantine Empire
1302	1302	Battle of Dimbos	Ottoman Empire	Byzantine Empire
14th century	14th century	K'aissape–Hvalsey war	Inuit under K'aissape	Norsemen under Ungortoq
1303	1303	Conquest of Sylhet	Independent Bengal (Delhi Sultanate breakaway)	Gaur Kingdom of Srihatta
1304	1304	Salt War	Republic of Venice	Padua
1306	1310	Hospitaller conquest of Rhodes	Knights Hospitaller	Byzantine Empire
1308	1308	Teutonic takeover of Danzig (Gdańsk)	Teutonic Knights	(Holy Roman Empire) Margraviate of Brandenburg
1308	1313	War of Ferrara	Republic of Venice	Papacy and Guelph cities of northern Italy
1309	1309	Crusade of the Poor	Duchy of Brabant	Crusaders
1310	1310	Tiepolo conspiracy	Republic of Venice	Faction of Bajamonte Tiepolo
1311	1312	Rebellion of mayor Albert	Władysław I the Elbow-high	Kraków
1311	1318	Delhi–Seuna War	Delhi Sultanate	Seuna Empire
1314	1318	Esen Buqa–Ayurbarwada war	Yuan dynasty Ilkhanate	Chagatai Khanate
1315	1315	Battle of Morgarten	Swiss Confederation; Uri; Schwyz; Unterwalden	Austria
1315	1318	Bruce campaign in Ireland	Lordship of Ireland; Kingdom of England	Kingdom of Scotland
1316	1316	Nambi rebellion	Majapahit Empire	Nambi forces
1317	1326	Siege of Bursa	Ottoman Empire	Byzantine Empire
1318	1318	Semi rebellion	Majapahit Empire	Semi forces
1319	1319	Ra Kuti rebellion	Majapahit Empire	Ra Kuti forces
1320	1320	Shepherds' Crusade	Kingdom of France	Peasants
1321	1322	Swedish–Novgorodian Wars	Kingdom of Sweden	Republic of Novgorod
1321	1322	Despenser War	?	?
1322	1322	Battle of Mühldorf	Duchy of Upper Bavaria; Kingdom of Bohemia; Burgraviate of Nuremberg	Duchy of Austria; Duchy of Carinthia; Prince-Archbishopric of Salzburg; Bishopric of Passau
1323	1328	Peasant revolt in Flanders	Flanders; Kingdom of France	Peasant Army
1324	1326	War of Metz	Republic of Metz	Electorate of Trier; Duchy of Lorraine; Duchy of Bar
1326	1328	First War of the Rügen Succession	Gerhard of Holstein	Henry II of Mecklenburg
1326	1329	War of Hum	Banate of Bosnia	(Serbian Empire) Serbian Kingdom
1326	1332	Polish–Teutonic War	Teutonic Knights	Kingdom of Poland
1327	1327	Tver Uprising of 1327	Golden Horde; Principality of Moscow; Principality of Suzdal	Principality of Tver
1328	1331	Siege of Nicaea	Ottoman Empire	Byzantine Empire
1328	1332	War of the Two Capitals	Khanbaliq Faction	Shangdu Faction
1329	1331	Bhre Sedang and Keta rebellion	Majapahit Empire	Bhre Sedang forces Keta forces
1331	1331	Serbian civil war of 1331	Faction of Stefan Dušan	Faction of Stefan Uroš III
1331	1333	Genkō War	Imperial forces loyal to Emperor Go-Daigo	Kamakura Shogunate
1331	1337	Eltz Feud	Electorate of Trier	Ehrenburg; Eltz; Schöneck; Waldeck
1332	1357	Second War of Scottish Independence	Kingdom of Scotland; Kingdom of France	Kingdom of England
1333	1338	Burke Civil War	Faction of Edmond de Burgh	Faction of Edmond Albanach de Burgh; Faction of Uilleag de Burgh
1336	1392	Nanboku-chō Wars	Northern Court; Ashikaga shogunate	Southern Court
1336	1339	Scaliger War	Republic of Venice; Republic of Florence; others	Scaliger lordship of Verona
1337	1337	Siege of Nicomedia	Ottoman Empire	Byzantine Empire
1337	1453	Hundred Years' War	Kingdom of France; Crown of Castile; Kingdom of Scotland; Republic of Genoa; Kingdom of Majorca; Kingdom of Bohemia; Crown of Aragon; Duchy of Brittany	Kingdom of England; Duchy of Burgundy; Aquitaine; Kingdom of Portugal; Kingdom of Navarre; Flanders; County of Hainaut; Holy Roman Empire
1338	1339	Shah Mir–Lohara War	Shah Mir dynasty	Lohara dynasty
1340	1349		Michael Komnenos; John III; Manuel II of Trebizond	Anna Anachoutlou; Georgian mercenaries
1340	1345	Majapahit invasion of Aru	Majapahit Empire	Aru Kingdom
1340	1392	Galicia–Volhynia Wars	Kingdom of Poland local factions	Kingdom of Hungary; Duchy of Masovia
1340	1396	Bulgarian–Ottoman Wars	Ottoman Empire	Bulgarian Empire
1341	1364	War of the Breton Succession; Part of the Hundred Years' War	Kingdom of England	Kingdom of France
1341	1347	Byzantine civil war	(Byzantine Empire) John VI Kantakouzenos	(Byzantine Empire) John V Palaiologos
1342	1342	Battle of Zava	Kartids	Sarbadars
1342	1346	Thuringian Counts' War	House of Wettin	House of Schwarzburg
1342	1354	Second War of the Rügen Succession	Duchy of Pomerania-Wolgast	House of Mecklenburg
1343	1346	St. George's Night Uprising	Teutonic Order; Denmark	Vironians; Oeselians
1345	1347	Byzantine civil war of 1341–1347	Ottoman Empire (1345–1347) (Byzantine Empire) John VI Kantakouzenos (Serbian Empire) Serbia (1342–1343); Beylik of Aydin (1342/3–1345); Beylik of Saruhan	(Byzantine Empire) John V Palaiologos (Byzantine Empire) Anna of Savoy (Byzantine Empire) John XIV Kalekas (Byzantine Empire) Alexios Apokaukos; Zealots of Thessalonica (Serbian Empire) Serbia (1343–1347); Second Bulgarian Empire; Principality of Karvuna
1347	1352	Neapolitan campaigns of Louis the Great	Kingdom of Hungary	Kingdom of Naples
1348	1349	Byzantine–Genoese War	Byzantine Empire	Republic of Genoa
1350	1490	Hook and Cod wars	Hook League	Cod League
1351	1368	Red Turban Rebellion	Ming dynasty Dahan; Kingdom of Dazhou; Empire of Tianwan; Empire of Daxia	Yuan dynasty
1352	1357	Byzantine civil war of 1352–1357	(Byzantine Empire) John V Palaiologos	(Byzantine Empire) John VI Kantakouzenos
1353	1354	Delhite invasion of Bengal	Bengal Sultanate	Delhi Sultanate
1354	1354	Fall of Gallipoli	Ottoman Empire	Byzantine Empire
1355	1355	Faliero coup	Republic of Venice	Faction of Marino Faliero
1356	1375	War of the Two Peters	Crown of Aragon; With the support of: Henry of Trastámara; Kingdom of France	Crown of Castile; With the support of: Kingdom of England; Republic of Genoa; Kingdom of Portugal; Kingdom of Navarre; Kingdom of Granada
1357	1366	Ispah rebellion	Yuan dynasty	Semu Muslim rebels
1358	1358	Jacquerie	Kingdom of France	French peasants
1358	1360	Delhite invasion of Bengal (1353–1354)	Bengal Sultanate	Delhi Sultanate
1360	1360	Ottoman conquest of Adrianople	Ottoman Empire	Byzantine Empire
1362	1457	War of the Bands	Gamboíno Families	Oñacino Families
1363	1368	Revolt of Saint Titus	Republic of Venice	Cretan Feudatories
1364	1364	Battle of Sırpsındığı	Ottoman Empire	Serbian Empire; Second Bulgarian Empire; Wallachia; Banate of Bosnia; Kingdom of Hungary
1366	1369	Castilian Civil War	Pedro of Castile; Kingdom of England	Henry of Trastámara; Kingdom of France; Aragon
1367	1390	Cham–Vietnamese War (1367–1390)	Champa	Đại Việt
1370	1388	War of the Lüneburg Succession	Magnus II, Duke of Brunswick-Lüneburg	Wenceslaus I, Duke of Saxe-Wittenberg
1371	1371	Battle of Samokov	Ottoman Empire	Second Bulgarian Empire; Moravian Serbia
1371	1371	Battle of Maritsa	Ottoman Empire	Serbian Empire
1371	1379	War of the Guelderian Succession	Duchy of Jülich; Bronckhorst faction	Blois; Heeckeren faction
1372	1373	Paduan–Venetian border war	Republic of Venice	Padua
1373	1379	Byzantine civil war of 1373–1379	(Byzantine Empire) John V Palaiologos; Ottoman Empire; Republic of Venice	(Byzantine Empire) Andronikos IV Palaiologos (Ottoman Empire) Savcı Bey; Republic of Genoa
1375	1378	War of the Eight Saints	Papal States	Florence; Milan; Siena
1378	1381	War of Chioggia	Republic of Venice	Republic of Genoa
1378	1384	Tuchin Revolt; Part of the Hundred Years' War	Kingdom of France	Workers
1380	1380	Battle of Kulikovo	Principality of Moscow Principality of Beloozero; Principality of Rostov; Principality of Yaroslavl; Principality of Suzdal—Nizhny Novgorod; Principality of Murom	Golden Horde
1381	1381	Peasants' Revolt	Kingdom of England	English peasants
1381	1384	Lithuanian Civil War (1381–1384)	Grand Duchy of Lithuania	Teutonic Knights; Samogitia
1381	1382	Ming conquest of Yunnan	Ming dynasty	Yuan dynasty
1382	1382	Harelle	Kingdom of France	French peasants
1382	1383	Despenser's Crusade	Kingdom of France; County of Flanders; Avignon Papacy	Kingdom of England; Ghent; Papal States
1382	1385	Greater Poland Civil War	Grzymała	Nałęcz
1383	1385	1383–1385 Crisis	Kingdom of Portugal Kingdom of England	Crown of Castille Kingdom of France
1380	1390	Tokhtamysh–Timur war	Timurid dynasty	Golden Horde
1385	1402	Dohna Feud	Margravate of Meissen	Burgravate of Dohna
1385	1424	Forty Years' War	Kingdom of Ava	Kingdom of Hanthawaddy
1386	1404	Timur's invasions of Georgia	Timurid dynasty	Kingdom of Georgia
1387	1387	Ming campaign against the Uriankhai	Ming dynasty	Uriankhai Mongol horde
1387	1389	War of the Cities (1387–1389)	Duchy of Bavaria	Swabian League of Cities
1388	1388	Wihwado Retreat	Insurgents	Goryeo
1389	1389	Battle of Kosovo	Ottoman Empire	Moravian Serbia; District of Branković; Kingdom of Bosnia; Knights Hospitaller Albanian principalities
1389	1389			
1390	1390	Fall of Philadelphia	Ottoman Empire	Byzantine Empire
1390	1392	First Florentine–Milanese War	Lordship of Milan	Republic of Florence, Bologna, Lordship of Padua, and allies
1397	1398	Second Florentine–Milanese War	Duchy of Milan	Republic of Florence, Bologna, Lordship of Padua, and allies
1398	1398	Crusade of Tedelis	Crown of Aragon	Zayyanid dynasty
1396	1396	Battle of Nicopolis	Ottoman Empire Moravian Serbia	Holy Roman Empire: Bohemian Crown; Duchy of Savoy; Swiss Confederacy; Kingdom of France: Duchy of Burgundy; Kingdom of Hungary: Voivodship of Transylvania; Kingdom of Croatia; Principality of Wallachia; Knights Hospitaller; Republic of Venice; Republic of Genoa; Second Bulgarian Empire; Poland Middle Ages; Kingdom of Navarre; Teutonic Knights; Byzantine Empire
1399	1400	Epiphany Rising	Kingdom of England	English rebels
1399	1402	Jingnan Campaign	Prince of Yan	Ming dynasty under the Jianwen Emperor

== 1400–1499 ==
Start	Finish	Name of Conflict	Belligerents	
Start	Finish	Name of Conflict	Victorious party (if applicable)	Defeated party (if applicable)
1400	1400	English invasion of Scotland	Kingdom of Scotland	Kingdom of England
1400	1402	Third Florentine–Milanese War	Duchy of Milan	Republic of Florence, Bologna, Rupert of the Palatinate
1400	1420	Glyndŵr Rising	Kingdom of England	Welsh rebels Kingdom of France
1401	1404	First Samogitian Uprising	Teutonic State	Grand Duchy of Lithuania: Duchy of Samogitia
1402	1402	Battle of Ankara	Timurid Empire	Ottoman Empire; Lordship of Sati and Dagnum; Jonima Estate; Principality of Dukagjini; Despotate of Serbia (Wallachia) Wallachian contingents
1402	1413	Ottoman Interregnum	Faction of Mehmed I	Faction of İsa Çelebi; Faction of Musa Çelebi; Faction of Süleyman Çelebi; Faction of Mustafa Çelebi
1402	1496	Conquest of the Canary Islands	Union of Castile and Aragon	Guanches
1403	1403	Percy Rebellion	Kingdom of England	English rebels
1404	1405	War of Padua	Republic of Venice; Duchy of Milan; Lordship of Mantua	Lordship of Padua [Lordship of Ferrara
1404	1406	Regreg war	Western court	Eastern court
1405	1405	Scrope Rebellion	Kingdom of England	English rebels
1405	1413	First Scutari War	Zeta	Republic of Venice
1406	1407	Ming conquest of Đại Việt	Ming dynasty	Đại Việt under Ho regime
1407	1435	Armagnac–Burgundian Civil War; Part of the Hundred Years' War	Armagnac party	Burgundian party England
1407	1414	Revolts of Trần princes	Ming dynasty	Vietnamese led by Trần princes
1407	1407	Jakam's Aq Qoyunlu campaign	Aq Qoyunlu; Various Turkmen tribes Mamluks loyal to An-Nasir Faraj	Mamluks loyal to Jakam; Artuqids
1407	1502	Turkoman invasions of Georgia	Georgian Empire; Kingdom of Kartli; Kingdom of Kakheti; Shirvanshahs; Safavid Empire	Qara Qoyunlu; Aq Qoyunlu
1409	1409	Second Samogitian Uprising	Teutonic State	Grand Duchy of Lithuania: Duchy of Samogitia
1409	1411	Polish–Lithuanian–Teutonic War	Kingdom of Poland; Grand Duchy of Lithuania	Teutonic Knights
1410 or 1411	1410 or 1411	Ming–Kotte War	Ming dynasty	Kingdom of Kotte
1413	1413	Cabochien Revolt; Part of the Hundred Years' War	Armagnacs	Cabochiens
1413	1415	Great Frisian War	Skieringers; Heeckerens anti-Onstas	Fetkeapers van Bronckhorsts tom Brok
1414	1414	Hunger War	Kingdom of Poland; Grand Duchy of Lithuania	Teutonic Order and mercenaries
1414	1414	Oldcastle Revolt	Kingdom of England	Lollards
1416	1416	Battle of Gallipoli (1416)	Republic of Venice	Ottoman Empire
1418	1427	Lam Sơn uprising	Vietnamese rebels led by Lê Lợi	Ming dynasty
1419	1419	Ōei Invasion	Sō clan Ashikaga Shogunate	Goryeo
1419	1423	Second Scutari War	Zeta (until 1421); Serbian Despotate (after 1421); Albanian nobility	Republic of Venice
1419	1434	Hussite Wars	Holy Roman Empire; Royalists; Hungary; Pope moderated Hussites (Utraquists); Serbian mercenaries	Hussites 1419–1423, Radical Hussites (Taborites and Orebites) 1423–1434
1420	1420	Lê Ngạ's Uprising	Ming dynasty	Vietnamese anti-Chinese rebels
1420	1422	Bavarian War	Bavaria-Landshut; Bavaria-Munich	Bavaria-Ingolstadt
1421	1422	War of the Oxen; Part of the Bavarian War	Bavaria-Landshut	County Haag
1421	1522	2nd Conquest of Anatolia	Ottoman Empire	Beylik of Karaman; Beylik of Isfendiyar; Beylik of Aydin; Empire of Trebizond; Sultanate of Eretna; Beylik of Teke; Byzantine Empire; Beyliks of Canik; Beylik of Germiyan; Beylik of Menteşe; Beylik of Saruhan
1422	1422	Siege of Constantinople (1422)	Byzantine Empire	Ottoman Empire
1422	1430	Siege of Thessalonica (1422–1430)	Ottoman Empire	Byzantine Empire; Republic of Venice
1422	1422	Gollub War	Kingdom of Poland; Grand Duchy of Lithuania; Principality of Moldavia	Teutonic Order and mercenaries and various knights from the rest of Europe
1423	1424	War of L'Aquila	L'Aquila; Duchy of Milan; Kingdom of Naples; Papal States	Braccio da Montone
1425	1453	Muscovite Civil War	Party of Vasily the Blind	Party of Vasily Kosoy; Party of Dmitry Shemyaka
1425	1454	Wars in Lombardy	Duchy of Milan	Republic of Venice
1426	1435	Dano-Hanseatic War (1426–35)	Hanseatic League; Holstein-Rendsburg	Kalmar Union; Pomerania-Barth
1427	1427	Mainz-Hessian War	Landgraviate of Hesse	Electorate of Mainz
1428	1428	Shocho uprising	Peasants	Muromachi Shogunate
1428	1428	Siege of Golubac	Ottoman Empire	Kingdom of Hungary; Wallachia; Grand Duchy of Lithuania
1428	1443	Neville–Neville feud	Ralph Neville, 1st Earl of Westmorland	Richard Neville, 5th Earl of Salisbury
1429	1433	Edessa Campaigns (1429–1433)	Mamluk Sultanate	Aq Qoyunlu
1429	1429	Siege of Malta (1429)	Hafsid dynasty	Aragon; Kingdom of Sicily
1431	1435	Polish–Teutonic War (1431–35)	Kingdom of Poland	Teutonic Order
1431	1435	First Irmandiño	Kingdom of Galicia	Peasants
1431	1435	Lithuanian Civil War (1431–35)	Western Grand Duchy of Lithuania (Samogitian Eldership, Trakai Voivodeship, Vilnius Voivodeship, Podlasie) Kingdom of Poland; Hussites	Eastern Grand Duchy of Lithuania (Polotsk, Vitebsk, Smolensk, Kiev, Volhynia) Teutonic Knights; Livonian Order; Golden Horde
1432	1436	Albanian Revolt of 1432–36	Ottoman Empire	Albanian rebels
1434	1436	Engelbrekt rebellion	Swedish rebels	Kalmar Union
1435	1437	Janibak al-Sufi revolt	Mamluk Sultanate; Karamanids	Mamluk rebels Beylik of Dulkadir; Ottoman Empire; Aq Qoyunlu
1436	1437	Pukefejden	Party of Charles VIII of Sweden	Party of Erik Puke
1436	1436	Battle of Diyarbakır	Mamluk Sultanate	Aq Qoyunlu
1436	1449	Luchuan–Pingmian campaigns	Tai Tribesmen	Ming dynasty
1437	1438	Transylvanian peasant revolt	Transylvanian aristocracy	Transylvanian peasants and petty nobles
1438	1438	Aq Qoyunlu campaign (1438)	Mamluk Sultanate	Aq Qoyunlu
1438	1441	Dutch–Hanseatic War	Burgundy: Burgundian Netherlands; Hanseatic League; Lüneburg; Mecklenburg; Pomerania; Holstein; Bremen; Brandenburg	
1438	1440	Chanka–Inca War	Kingdom of Cusco	Chanka Chiefdom
1440	1440	Praguerie	Kingdom of France	French nobility
1440	1446	Old Zürich War	Old Swiss Confederacy	Imperial City of Zurich; Habsburg Further Austria; France
1443	1444	Battle of Nish (1443) and Crusade of Varna	Ottoman Empire	Poland Middle Ages; Kingdom of Hungary; Kingdom of Croatia; Grand Duchy of Lithuania; Serbian Despotate; Crown of Bohemia; Principality of Wallachia; Bulgarian rebels Kingdom of Bosnia; Papal States; Teutonic Knights; Duchy of Burgundy (Republic of Venice) Republic of Venice; Republic of Ragusa
1444	1444	Battle of Torvioll	League of Lezhë	Ottoman Empire
1444	1444	Siege of Rhodes (1444)	Knights Hospitaller	Mamluk Sultanate
1444	1449	Soest Feud	Soest	
1445	1450	Colla–Inca War	Inca Empire	Colla Kingdom
1446	1451	Saxon Fratricidal War	Frederick II, Elector of Saxony	William III, Landgrave of Thuringia
1446	1519	Flower war	Aztec Empire	Tlaxcala; Cholula
1447	1448	Albanian–Venetian War	League of Lezhë	Republic of Venice Ottoman Empire
1447	1454	Milanese War of Succession	House of Sforza; Duchy of Milan (1450–4); Republic of Florence (1452–4); Kingdom of France (1452–4)	Ambrosian Republic (1447–50); Duchy of Savoy Republic of Venice; Margravate of Mantua
1449	1449	Tumu Crisis	Oirats	Ming dynasty
1449	1450	First Margrave War	Imperial City of Nuremberg	Principality of Ansbach
1449	1453	Revolt of Ghent (1449–53)	Duchy of Burgundy	Ghent
1449	1454	Kotte conquest of the Jaffna kingdom	Kingdom of Kotte	Jaffna kingdom
1450	1450	Jack Cade Rebellion	Kingdom of England	English peasants
1451	1455	Navarrese Civil War	John II of Aragon and Navarre	Charles, Prince of Viana
1453	1453	Fall of Constantinople	Ottoman Empire	Byzantine Empire; Republic of Genoa
1453	1454	Morea revolt of 1453–1454	Despotate of the Morea	Peasants
1453	1454	Percy–Neville feud	House of Neville	House of Percy
1454	1466	Thirteen Years' War (1454–66)	(Holy Roman Empire) Prussian Confederation Kingdom of Poland	Teutonic State
1454	1519	Flower war	Mexica Empire; Tlaxcala	Cholula; Huejotzingo; Atlixco
1455	1455	Bonville–Courtenay feud	Thomas de Courtenay, 5th Earl of Devon	William Bonville, 1st Baron Bonville
1455	1455	Siege of Berat (1455)	Ottoman Empire	League of Lezhë
1455	1487	Wars of the Roses	House of Lancaster	House of York
1456	1456	Siege of Belgrade (1456)	Kingdom of Hungary; Serbs; European Crusaders	Ottoman Empire
1456	1474	Ayutthaya-Lan Na War	Kingdom of Ayutthaya	Kingdom of Lanna
1457	1457	Koshamain's War	Ashikaga Shogunate	Ainu
1459	1459	Siege of Smederevo (1459)	Ottoman Empire	Serbian Despotate
1459	1463	Bavarian War (1459–63)	Margraviate of Brandenburg	Bavaria-Landshut
1460	1460	Siege of Amasra	Ottoman Empire	Republic of Genoa
1461	1461	Rebellion of Cao Qin	Ming dynasty	Cao Qin
1461	1461	Siege of Trebizond (1461)	Ottoman Empire	Empire of Trebizond
1462	1462	The Night Attack	Wallachia	Ottoman Empire
1462	1462	Ottoman conquest of Lesbos	Ottoman Empire	Gattilusio; Knights Hospitaller
1462	1472	Catalan Civil War	Crown of Aragon	Principality of Catalonia
1463	1479	Ottoman–Venetian War (1463–1479)	Ottoman Empire	Republic of Venice; Papal States; League of Lezhë; Principality of Zeta; Kingdom of Hungary (Sovereign Military Order of Malta) Knights Hospitaller; Crown of Aragon; Kingdom of Naples; Aq Qoyunlu; Duchy of Burgundy; Holy Roman Empire; Principality of Moldavia; Kingdom of Croatia; Duchy of Saint Sava; Kingdom of France; Republic of Ragusa; Grand Duchy of Lithuania; Crown of Castile; Florence; Karamanids; Maniots; Greek rebels
1463	1463	Siege of Jajce	Ottoman Empire	Kingdom of Hungary; Republic of Venice; Kingdom of Bosnia
1463/1464	1465	Siege of Gerger	Aq Qoyunlu; Pazuku Kurds	Mamluk Sultanate
1464	1472	War of the Succession of Stettin	Margraviate of Brandenburg	Duchy of Pomerania
1465	1465	1465 Moroccan revolt	Sharifs of Fez	Marinids
1465	1465	Ballaban's campaign of 1465	League of Lezhë	Ottoman Empire
1465	1465	War of the Public Weal	Duchy of Burgundy	Kingdom of France
1465	1468	Wars of Liège	Duchy of Burgundy	Prince-Bishopric of Liège
1467	1469	First Irmandiño	Kingdom of Galicia	Peasants
1467	1477	Ōnin War; Part of the Sengoku Period	Hosokawa clan Hatakeyama Masanaga	Yamana clan Ōuchi clan Hatakeyama Yoshinari
1467	1479	War of the Priests	Kingdom of Poland	Prince-Bishopric of Warmia
1468	1478	Bohemian War (1468–78)	Kingdom of Hungary	Kingdom of Bohemia
1468	1469		Duchy of Bavaria	
1470	1470	Chimor–Inca War	Inca Empire	Chimor Empire
1470	1474	Aq Qoyunlu–Mamluk War (1470–1474)	Mamluk Sultanate	Aq Qoyunlu
1470	1471	Dano-Swedish War (1470–71)	Sweden	Denmark; German Knights
1470	1474	First Utrecht Civil War	Utrecht Hooks	Utrecht Cods
1471	1471	Cham–Vietnamese War (1471)	Đại Việt	Champa
1473	1473	Battle of Otlukbeli	Ottoman Empire	Aq Qoyunlu
1473	1473	Tenochtitlan-Tlatelolco Conflict	Tenochtitlan	Tlatelolco
1474	1477	Burgundian Wars	(Switzerland) Swiss Confederation	Duchy of Burgundy
1475	1479	War of the Castilian Succession	Isabella Supporters; Crown of Aragon	Juana Supporters; Kingdom of Portugal; Kingdom of France
1476	1476	Ottoman-Moldavian War of 1476	Ottoman Empire	Moldavia
1477	1488	Austrian–Hungarian War (1477–88)	Kingdom of Hungary	Holy Roman Empire
1478	1478	Siege of Krujë (1478)	Ottoman Empire	League of Lezhë; Republic of Venice
1479	1480	Vietnamese-Laotian War (1479–80)	Đại Việt	Lan Xang Muang Phuan Lan Na
1480	1480	Siege of Rhodes (1480)	Knights Hospitaller	Ottoman Empire
1480	1510	Saltpeter War (Mexico)	Tarascan state	Purépecha
1481	1483	Second Utrecht Civil War	Utrecht Hooks	Utrecht Cods
1482	1484	War of Ferrara	Republic of Venice; Papal States	Duchy of Ferrara; Kingdom of Naples
1482	1492	Granada War	Union of the Crown of Castile and Crown of Aragon	Emirate of Granada
1483	1483	Buckingham's rebellion	Kingdom of England	English rebels
1483	1485	1483 Flemish Revolt	Habsburg Netherlands	Flemish separatists
1484	1484	Mieres Uprising	Castile-Aragon Union	Catalan peasants
1485	1488	Mad War	Kingdom of France	Rebel Barons
1485	1503	Polish–Ottoman War (1485–1503)	Ottoman Empire; Crimean Khanate	Kingdom of Poland; Duchy of Masovia; Teutonic Order; Grand Duchy of Lithuania
1486	1486	Stafford and Lovell Rebellion	Kingdom of England	Francis Lovell
1486	1487	Simmel Rebellion	Kingdom of England	English rebels
1487	1492	1487 Flemish Revolt	Holy Roman Empire	Flemish separatists
1487	1487	Battle of Magari	Rokkaku clan Iga–Kōka alliance	Ashikaga shogunate
1487	1488	Kaga Rebellion	Ikkō-ikki; Motoori clan Yamagawa clan Other rebels	Togashi clan
1489	1489	Yorkshire rebellion 1489	Kingdom of England	Tax Resisters
1491	1492	Bread and Cheese Revolt	Habsburg Monarchy; Habsburg Netherlands	Peasants & Fishermen
1492	1494	First Muscovite–Lithuanian War	Grand Principality of Moscow; Crimean Khanate	Grand Duchy of Lithuania; Vyazma
1493	1593	Hundred Years' Croatian-Ottoman War part of the Ottoman–Habsburg wars	Kingdom of Croatia; Kingdom of Hungary; Holy Roman Empire; Ottoman Empire Eyalet of Bosnia Budin Eyalet	
1494	1498	Italian War of 1494–98	Papal States; Republic of Venice; Kingdom of Naples; Spain; Duchy of Milan; Holy Roman Empire	France
1495	1497	Russo-Swedish War (1495–97)	Grand Principality of Moscow	Kingdom of Denmark; Kingdom of Sweden
1497	1497	Cornish Rebellion of 1497	Kingdom of England	Cornish Rebels
1497	1497	Second Cornish Uprising of 1497	Kingdom of England	Cornish Rebels
1497	1497	Warbeck Rebellion	Kingdom of England	English rebels
1497	1497	Conquest of Melilla	Union of Castile and Aragon	Morocco
1499	1499	Swabian War	Old Swiss Confederacy, Three Leagues of the Grisons	Swabian League; Holy Roman Empire
1499	1501	Rebellion of the Alpujarras (1499–1501)	Union of Castile and Aragon	Muslims of Granada
1499	1503	Ottoman–Venetian War (1499–1503)	Ottoman Empire	Republic of Venice; Spain
1499	1504	Italian War of 1499–1504	Duchy of Milan; Kingdom of Naples; Spain (after 1501)	France; Republic of Venice; Spain (until 1501)
