= Janibak al-Sufi revolt =

- Part of the Aq Qoyunlu–Mamluk wars, Revolts in the Mamluk Sultanate and Ottoman–Mamluk wars
- Cilicia in the 15th century (in Russian)
Date	1435–1437
Location	Cilicia
Result	Mamluk government victory

Belligerents
Mamluk Sultanate; Karamanids	Mamluk rebels Dulkadirids; Ottoman Empire; Aq Qoyunlu

Commanders and leaders
Barsbay; Divrigi; Tagribirmi; Sayf al-Din Inal; Gökçe Musa; Ibrahim II of Karaman	Janibak al-Sufi (executed); Kumushbuqa az-Zahiri (executed); Kurmush al-Awar (executed); Murad II; Yörgüç Pasha; Sanjak-bey of Antalya †; Uthman Beg (until 1435); Ali Beg; Muhammed Bey; Hüseyin Mirza (POW); Jahangir Mirza (POW); Hamza Bey Bayandur; Nasıreddin Bey; Suleiman

Strength
Total army unknown: 7,000 Under Divrigi	12,000 at peak 2,000

Casualties and losses
Unknown	Almost all rebels killed <12,000 killed (1436)

The Janibak al-Sufi revolt (1435–1437) was a significant uprising against the Mamluk Sultanate and its Dulkadirid allies in southeastern Anatolia. Despite his initial setbacks, Janibak managed to rally forces but was eventually defeated near Aintab. The Mamluk Sultan Barsbay personally intervened, leading to Janibak’s final defeat and execution in 1437. The conflict highlighted the complex interplay of regional powers, including the Mamluks, Dulkadirids, Aq Qoyunlu, and the emerging Ottomans.

== Background ==
=== Early Life and Struggle for the Throne ===
Janibak was presumably of Circassian descent. As a young man, he entered the Mamluk corps under Sultan az-Zahir Barquq (1382–1399) in Cairo. During the reign of Barquq’s son, Sultan an-Nasir Faraj (1399–1412), Janibak’s early career remains mostly obscure, but it is known that he rose through the Mamluk military and political hierarchy, eventually reaching the rank of "emir of a hundred"—a title that granted him the status of a court dignitary in Cairo. Under Sultan al-Mu’ayyad Shaykh (1412–1421), Janibak was appointed to several high-ranking positions at court, but in 1415, for reasons unknown, he was imprisoned and remained in custody until 1418.

In 1421, following the death of Sultan Sayf al-Din Tatar in Cairo, Janibak served as regent while Barsbay held the position of Atabeg. A power struggle broke out between the two emirs for control of the sultanate, which ended with Barsbay’s victory.

As a result, Janibak was imprisoned once more but managed to escape in 1423, seeking refuge with Mubariz al-Din Isfendiyar in Kastamonu.

=== Life in Exile and Plans for Revolt ===
When the Karamanids briefly occupied Kayseri which was under Ottoman control with Mamluk support, the Ottomans responded by considering Janibak a potential ally. He was invited to Amasya by the Ottoman governor Yörgüç Pasha, who also informed Nasıreddin Bey, ruler of Dulkadirs about Janibak’s arrival and the opportunity to encourage rebellion against the Mamluks.

Shortly afterward, Janibak formed an alliance with the Aq Qoyunlu governor of Çemişgezek, Muhammed Bey, the son of Uthman Beg. Together they captured Divriği from the Mamluks and launched a siege on Malatya which officially marked the beginning of the rebellion.

== Revolt ==
Due to a lack of sufficient support from the Aq Qoyunlu, Janibak was unable to capture Malatya and was forced to lift the siege. On 10 October 1435, he retreated to Dulkadirid territory. However, shortly after his arrival, Janibak was unexpectedly captured by Suleiman, the son of Dulkadirid ruler Nasir ad-Din Mehmed. Before any of his supporters could react, Janibak was sent in chains to Elbistan.

Despite this, Janibak, whom the Mamluks wanted to be sent to Cairo, was not delivered. Understanding Janibak’s strategic importance, Nasıreddin Muhammed Bey refused to extradite him to Egypt. Sultan Barsbay, determined to capture Janibak, declared an expedition against the Dulkadirs for harboring their rival. The Mamluk army, setting out from Egypt learned that Nasıreddin Bey was in Elbistan and attacked the city. However, upon hearing of the Mamluk army’s approach, Nasıreddin Bey fled. The Mamluks, after realizing Nasıreddin had escaped, sacked Elbistan and surrounding villages, killing nearly the entire population.

Following the sack of Elbistan, an army of 2,000 to 12,000 troops attacked Mamluk territories. On July 9–10, 1436, a two-day battle took place near Aintab between Janibak’s forces and the Mamluk army, resulting in Janibak’s defeat. He fled with only a few hundred survivors, while two of his commanders, Kurmush al-Awar and Kumushbuqa az-Zahiri, were captured and executed in Aleppo.

After failing to capture Janibak, Sultan Barsbay launched a campaign to Anatolia himself and sent his Syrian governors to pursue Janibak and Nasıreddin Muhammed Bey. Pressed by the Mamluk troops, Janibak al-Sufi and Nasir ad-Din Mehmed were forced to flee further and further northwest, as far as Sivas in Central Anatolia, where their pursuit ceased in September–October, and Barsbey’s troops returned to Aleppo. Soon news reached Cairo that Janibak al-Sufi and Nasir al-Din Mehmed had found refuge in the Ottoman Sultanate, near Ankara. The Ottoman Sultan then openly supported the Dulgadirids in their territorial disputes with the Karamanids and moved his armies to Kayseri.

On 22 December 1436, Barsbay immediately sent money and weapons to help the Karamanids. On 18 March 1437, news arrived that Janibak al-Sufi, Nasir al-Din Mehmed and his son Suleiman had joined the Ottoman offensive against the Karamanids and had amassed their troops near Kayseri. Barsbay ordered his Syrian naibs to send troops to help the Karamanids. While preparing for the battle on July 19, 1437, about two days’ journey from Marash, their camp was suddenly attacked by the Egyptian naib Divrigi with two thousand horsemen. The Ottoman governor of Antalya was killed, while Janibak and Mehmed fled in different directions. Mehmed sought refuge in Ottoman territory, while Janibak fled to Aq Qoyunlu lands, where he was welcomed by Ali Beg.

Tagrıbirmi, the viceroy of Aleppo, sent five thousand dinars to the sons of Kara Yülük to capture Janibak. Upon learning this, Janibak attempted to escape from Uthman’s sons but was captured and executed on Friday, October 25, 1437.

== Aftermath ==
When the convoy from Aleppo arrived to collect the prisoner and pay Mehmed and Mahmud, only Janibak's severed head was exchanged for the money they brought. The Wali of Aleppo promptly sent the head to Cairo, where the overjoyed Sultan Barsbay ordered it to be carried on a pike through the city on October 30 and then thrown into a ditch. About two months later, in January 1438, Janibak's sword was also brought to Cairo by Uthman Beg.

This symbolic act, intended to illustrate Barsbay's victory and power, ended the long history of his confrontation with the emir Janibak al-Sufi. According to the British Mamluk historian Peter Holt, Janibak's death freed Barsbay from "his most dangerous enemy" since, as Holt argued, "Janibak's arrival in Anatolia united individuals and groups opposed to Barsbay and, more generally, the Mamluk Sultanate as such." Sultan Barsbay himself died just a few months later, in June 1438.

== See also ==
- Mamluk Sultanate
- Murad II
- Ottoman Empire
- Edessa Campaigns (1429–1433)
