= Aq Qoyunlu campaign (1438) =

1438 Mamluk military campaign into Aq Qoyunlu territory

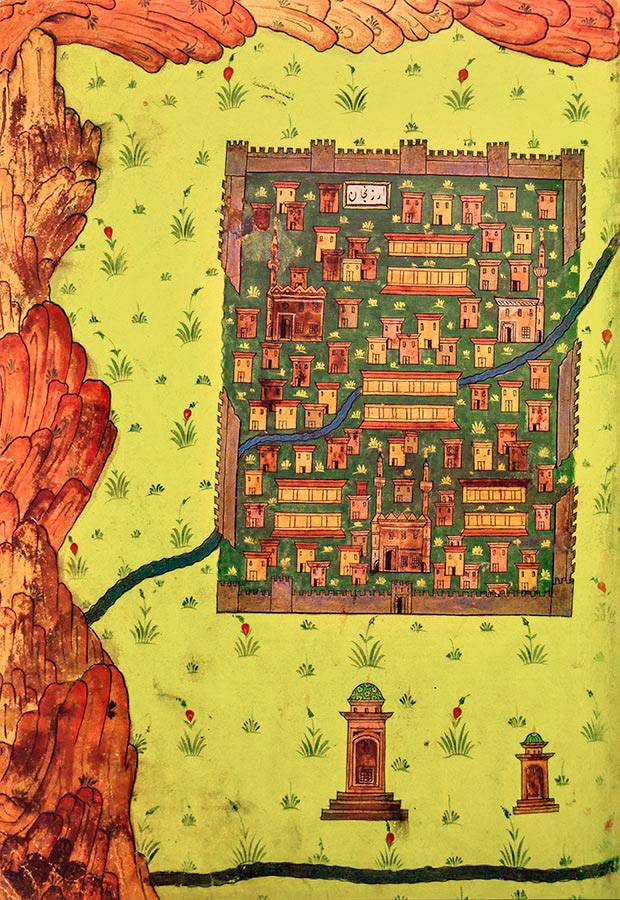
- Map of Erzincan by Matrakçı Nasuh
Date	1438
Location	Anatolia
Result	Mamluk victory: Surrender of Yaqub Beg

Belligerents
Mamluk Sultanate	Aq Qoyunlu

Commanders and leaders
Barsbay; Tagrıbirmiş; Jahangir Mirza	Yaqub Beg (surrendered); Inaq Hasan (MIA); Sultan Ahmad; Prince Jafar (POW)

Strength
50,000 cavalry	40,000

Casualties and losses
Unknown	27,000 casualties

The Aq Qoyunlu campaign (1438) was a military expedition launched by the Mamluk Sultanate into eastern Anatolia in support of the exiled Aq Qoyunlu prince Jahangir Mirza. The campaign occurred during a period of internal civil conflict among the Aq Qoyunlu following the deposition of Ali Beg by his son Hamza Bey Bayandur. Mamluk forces, led by commanders such as Atabek Tagrıbirmiş, captured key cities including Çemişgezek, Arapkir, and Erzincan, briefly expanding Mamluk influence in the region. The campaign ended with a negotiated peace, after which many Aq Qoyunlu governors submitted to Sultan Barsbay.

== Background ==
Between 1435 and 1437, after a failed revolt against Mamluk sultan Barsbay and a devastating defeat at the Battle of Diyarbakır (1436), Ali Beg lost both fame and popular support. In 1438, his son and the governor of Mardin, Hamza Bey Bayandur, captured the Aq Qoyunlu capital, Diyarbakır. Ali Beg fled to Erzincan with his sons Jahangir Mirza, Hüseyin, and Uzun Hasan, where the region was governed by his brother Yaqub Beg. Realizing resistance was futile, Ali Beg migrated to the Ottoman Empire with his sons.

Shortly after, Jahangir fled to Cairo and appealed to Sultan Barsbay for support. Initially reluctant to intervene, Barsbay eventually agreed to a military campaign after receiving reports of Hamza's alleged sympathy for Janibak al-Sufi. He mobilized an army of 50,000 cavalry, led by Atabek Tagrıbirmiş and the governors of Damascus and Aleppo.

It remains unclear whether the allegations against Hamza were true, as Barsbay had previously praised Hamza in letters to the Ottomans (1435–1438) and had also invited him to Damascus in a 1438 letter.

== Campaign ==
In spring 1438, Mamluk cavalry clashed with 40,000 Aq Qoyunlu troops near Çemişgezek. After heavy fighting, the Aq Qoyunlu lost 27,000 men and retreated. Çemişgezek and Arapkir were seized and incorporated into the province of Aleppo. The Mamluks then captured Akşehir after its governor, Inaq Hasan, went missing. Another Aq Qoyunlu governor, Sultan Ahmad, defected to the Mamluks with his forces and was given a command. He later captured several castles (exact locations unknown).

Meanwhile, the Mamluk army moved to Erzincan and besieged the fortress. After a short siege, Erzincan was captured. Yaqub Beg fled to Kemah, while his son Jafar, his wife, and all remaining defenders were captured. Following the defeat, Yaqub sent nobles to negotiate peace. Barsbay accepted, appointed Jahangir as governor of Erzincan, and returned the occupied lands. Several other Aq Qoyunlu governors also surrendered and swore allegiance to the Mamluks.

== Aftermath ==
Following the campaign, Barsbay began planning an invasion of the Qara Qoyunlu. However, his death in June 1438 halted the operation, and Aq Qoyunlu governors soon regained their independence.

== See also ==
- Battle of Diyarbakır (1436)
- Janibak al-Sufi revolt
- Barsbay
- Aq Qoyunlu
