= Egypt–Tunisia relations =

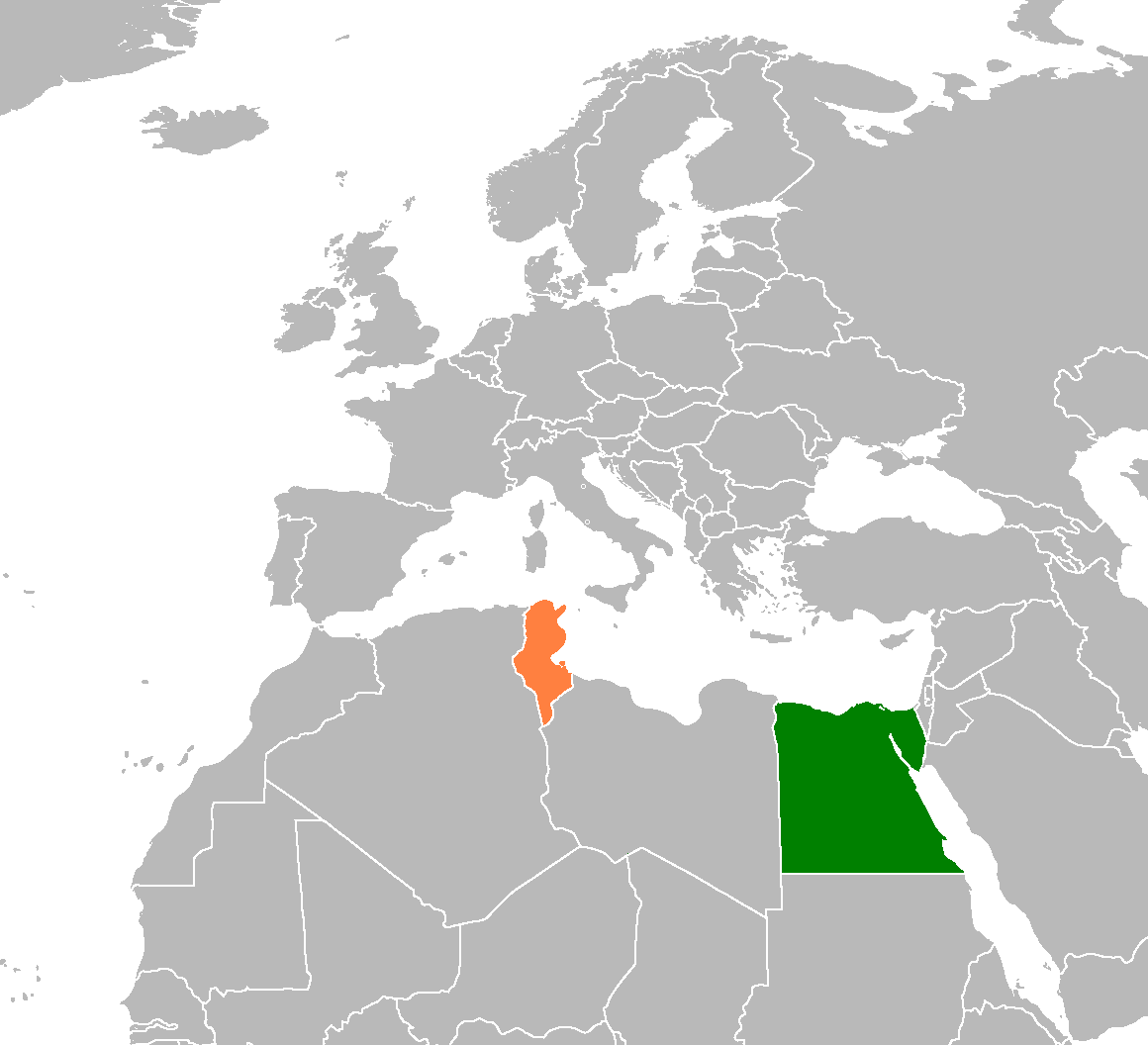
- Egypt: Tunisia

Egypt–Tunisia relations refers to the bilateral relationship between Egypt and Tunisia, two North African countries. Both countries are members of the Organisation of Islamic Cooperation, Union for the Mediterranean, African Union and United Nations.

== Antiquity to medieval relations ==
Egypt and Tunisia were homes of two of the earliest and oldest civilizations in Africa: the Egyptian civilization and Carthaginian civilization. Trade between Carthage and the Ptolemaic Kingdom was successful. Nonetheless, rivalry existed between the two countries, as the Egyptians sometimes exhibited hostility towards the Carthaginians. This complicated relationship between the two nations would remain until the end of antiquity and beginning of medieval eras.

The war elephants of Hannibal, which took part in his failed attempts to conquer Rome, were thought to have been traced back to Egypt.

Both Egypt and Tunisia were ruled by various empires: the Roman Empire, the Arab Caliphates and the Ottoman Empire. The most influential among all were the conquests led by Arabs, in which the two nations accepted the arrival of Islam and adopted the Arabic language instead of their ancient languages. The influence of Islam and Arabs also caused significant remarks with some of the oldest ongoing institutions located in the two countries, notably Al-Azhar University in Egypt and Great Mosque of Kairouan in Tunisia.

With the Ottoman conquest, Egypt and Tunisia were placed under the Turks. Ottoman Egypt and Ottoman Tunisia both functioned as autonomous provinces of the empire, but their relationships with the empire were different. Ottoman Tunisia, in majority, remained loyal to the Ottoman state and was one of the earliest regions to support the Tanzimat, which included the abolition of slavery in 1846, making Ottoman Tunisia one of the first countries to abolish slavery. It was also among the most liberal parts of the empire. On the other hand, Egypt had a number of conflicts with the Ottoman state, dating back to the Ottoman–Mamluk Wars and later Egyptian–Ottoman Wars; at the same time, Egypt supported the Ottomans in various Ottoman wars. This backlash of relations between Egypt and the Ottoman Empire further developed with its own different view that would eventually escalate into the 20th century under Gamal Abdel Nasser. Overall, Tunisia's relations with the Ottomans were deemed as good while Egypt's relations with the Ottomans were mostly complicated.

In the late 19th century, both Egypt and Tunisia were colonized by the British Empire and France. The former were both heavily modernized and effectively became some of the most liberal Arab countries, but its treatments varied. However, anti-British and anti-French activities in Egypt and Tunisia were so great that they pushed the British and French to re-consider their positions over their colonies. Egypt and Tunisia suffered much during World War II, being targeted by Nazi Germany and Fascist Italy; the turning points of the war also started in both nations, notably the North African Campaign.

== Modern relations ==
When Tunisia gained independence in 1956, Egypt and Tunisia established relations due to the efforts of Habib Bourguiba, who had previously studied in Egypt. Egypt and Tunisia maintained a cordial relationship, with Egypt and Tunisia on a common front against Israel. However, after Anwar Sadat signed the Egypt–Israel peace treaty at 1973, the relationship between two soured, though not directly, as Tunisia had refrained from engaging against Israel unlike Egypt prior to Sadat. It was not until the late 1980 s that Egypt and Tunisia restored ties, but Tunisia was able to maintain low-key relations with Egypt.

In 1985, Israel launched Operation Wooden Leg, attacking the headquarters of the Palestine Liberation Organization in Tunis, which prompted anger from Tunisians. Egypt was one of the nations to condemn the attack, helping to warm its relations with Tunisia. After the end of the Cold War, Egypt and Tunisia re-approached and established a strategic partnership.

=== Arab Spring ===
The outbreak of the Arab Spring drew strong support from both Tunisians and Egyptians alike, since they were the two earliest Arab nations to be influenced by the revolution. Despite this, only Tunisia was successful in transforming into a democracy; Egypt, on the other hand, saw a second change of regime and even more unrest, although it was able to fully avoid civil war unlike Syria, Yemen, Iraq and Libya.

Despite the Spring, the two countries' social issues remain unsolved. Radicalization of young people and Islamists alike, along with unstable economic conditions, have led to the two countries remaining corrupt even after the Spring.

== Cooperation ==
In 2019, Abdel Fattah El-Sisi announced the strengthening of relations and anti-terrorism with Tunisia. The two countries had also signed 10 cooperation agreements in 2017. It was expected, in 2017, that the trade relationship between the two would have a boost.

There are educational exchanges between Egypt and Tunisia on many fronts.

== Diplomatic missions ==
- Egypt has an embassy in Tunis.
- Tunisia has an embassy in Cairo.

== See also ==
- Foreign relations of Egypt
- Foreign relations of Tunisia
