= Battle of Diyarbakır =

1436 battle between Aq Qoyunlu and Mamluks

- Part of Janibak al-Sufi revolt
Date	1436
Location	Karaca Dağ, Diyarbakır
Result	Mamluk victory
Territorial changes	Harput annexed by Mamluks

Belligerents
Mamluk Sultanate	Aq Qoyunlu

Commanders and leaders
Barsbay (indirectly); Sayf al-Din Inal; Gökçe Musa	Ali Beg; Hüseyin Mirza (POW); Jahangir Mirza (POW)

Strength
Unknown but more	12,000

Casualties and losses
Unknown	Nearly entire army killed

Battle of Diyarbakır was fought between the Mamluk Sultanate and the Aq Qoyunlu in 1436, The Mamluks, aided by Döğer Turkmens achieved a decisive victory, capturing Jahangir Mirza and forcing the Aq Qoyunlu to cede Harput.

== Background ==
In 1435, Uthman Beg was defeated in a battle against the Qara Qoyunlu near Erzurum. He was wounded and later died from his injuries, succeeded by his son, Ali Beg.

During his reign, a rebellion supported by the Aq Qoyunlu was ongoing in the Mamluk Sultanate. In 1436, the rebels and the Dulkadirids were defeated at Aintab, weakening the revolt.

Seeing the rebels defeated, Ali Beg sought peace with the Mamluks and sent his son Hüseyin to Cairo, but he was imprisoned by Sultan Barsbay, who ordered his Döger Türkmen border guards in Diyar Mudar to attack Diyarbakır.

== Battle ==
At first Jahangir Mirza tried to ambush the Mamluk forces at Karaca Dağ but failed and his army was encircled, along with Ali Beg and Hamza Bey Bayandur.

After a long battle, the larger Mamluk army routed the Aq Qoyunlu forces. Döger Turkmens under Gökçe Musa, together with Circassian Mamluks led by Sayf al-Din Inal, defeated the Aq Qoyunlu army and captured Jahangir. Most of the Aq Qoyunlu soldiers perished in the battle.

Following this defeat, Ali Beg was forced to cede Harput to the Mamluks.

== See also ==
- Aq Qoyunlu
- Mamluk Sultanate
- Dulkadirids
- History of Diyarbakır
