= Jakam's Aq Qoyunlu campaign =

Campaign led by Mamluk commander Jakam against the Aq Qoyunlu (1407)

Jakam's campaign
- Part of Aq Qoyunlu–Mamluk wars
Date	April–June 1407
Location	Diyar Bakr
Result	Aq Qoyunlu victory: Death of Jakam and end of his rebellion

Belligerents
(Mamluk Sultanate) Mamluks loyal to Jakam: Artuqids	Aq Qoyunlu: Various Turkmen tribes (Mamluk Sultanate) Mamluks loyal to Faraj

Commanders and leaders
(Mamluk Sultanate) Jakam † (Mamluk Sultanate) Gumusboga al-Isevi (Mamluk Sultanate) Ibn Shihri † (Mamluk Sultanate) Nasir al-Din Muhammad † (Mamluk Sultanate) Timurboga al-Mashtub (Mamluk Sultanate) Amir Kumyk † (Mamluk Sultanate) Amir Akmul † (Mamluk Sultanate) Sarı Seyyidi †	Uthman Beg; Ibrahim Beg †; Hajib Feyyaz †; Najm al-Din Isa † (Mamluk Sultanate) / Amir Güzel †

Strength
7,000	Unknown

Casualties and losses
Most of the army	Heavy

Jakam's Aq Qoyunlu campaign was a military expedition launched by the Mamluk rebel commander Amir Jakam against the Aq Qoyunlu confederation during 1407. The campaign ended in Jakam's defeat and death, and his rebellion was crushed by the central Mamluk authorities.

== Background ==
Jakam was originally a Circassian slave of Barquq, who rose through the ranks and eventually became governor of several provinces. During the reign of Sultan An-Nasir Faraj, the Mamluk Sultanate suffered from severe political instability. Taking advantage of the situation, Jakam declared himself sultan and launched a rebellion in Syria, gaining the support of many local Amirs.

Despite a stalemate in the early stages of the rebellion, after prolonged fighting, Jakam managed to conquer territories stretching from Elbistan to Gaza. He declared an independent governorship and appointed his own Amirs across the region.

Meanwhile, the Aq Qoyunlu supported the central Mamluk government in Cairo during the rebellion and even launched attacks on rebel-held lands, notably targeting Birecik. Due to the failures of his supporters in Egypt, Jakam abandoned the idea of seizing Cairo itself. Instead, he chose to establish himself as an independent ruler in Aleppo, aiming to expand his control further by attempting to capture Mardin and Amid.

== Campaign ==
Jakam set out on a campaign in April–May 1407, accompanied by Amir Timurboga al-Mashtub, Nasir al-Din Muhammad, Ibn Shihri, Gumusboga al-Isevi, and other prominent Amirs.

He mobilized an army of approximately 7,000 men and marched toward Bira (modern Birecik), which had been occupied by the Aq Qoyunlu, who supported the original Mamluk-appointed rulers against Jakam. He quickly captured the area and killed the local deputy, Amir Güzel.

Following this victory, Uthman Bey sent a large number of camels and sheep to Jakam as gifts in an attempt to negotiate peace. However, Jakam rejected the offer and instead advanced on Mardin. He captured the city along with its governor, Najm al-Din Isa, and one of its commanders, Hajib Feyyaz. Jakam later sent Feyyaz to Osman, demanding the surrender of Amid without a battle, but Osman rejected the demand.

Jakam then launched a direct assault on Amid. During the fighting, Ibrahim Beg, a son of Osman, was killed. Osman, relying on the strong fortifications of Amid, pursued a defensive strategy and laid many traps around the city.

On June 4th, Jakam entered the Hevsel Gardens near Amid, where he was ambushed by Bayındır Turkmens. They attacked with stones, wounding him. While attempting to retreat, Jakam was struck again by arrows and killed, along with several of his key Amirs.

Most of his army, including many amirs such as Amir Akmul, Amir Sarı Seyyidi, and Amir Kumyk, was also killed. The ruler of Mardin and his commanders Hajib Feyyaz, who had been captured by the Mamluks, were also killed by friendly fire.

== Aftermath ==
After the death of Jakam, Amir Sheikh, the only Mamluk Amir loyal to Sultan, Ferec took control of the areas previously held by the rebels. He defeated a loyalist army in Gaza, killing and capturing all the Amirs who had supported him, effectively ending the rebellion.

== See also ==
- Mamluk Sultanate
- Aq Qoyunlu
