= Lê Ngã rebellion =

Military conflict

- Part of the Ming–Việt War
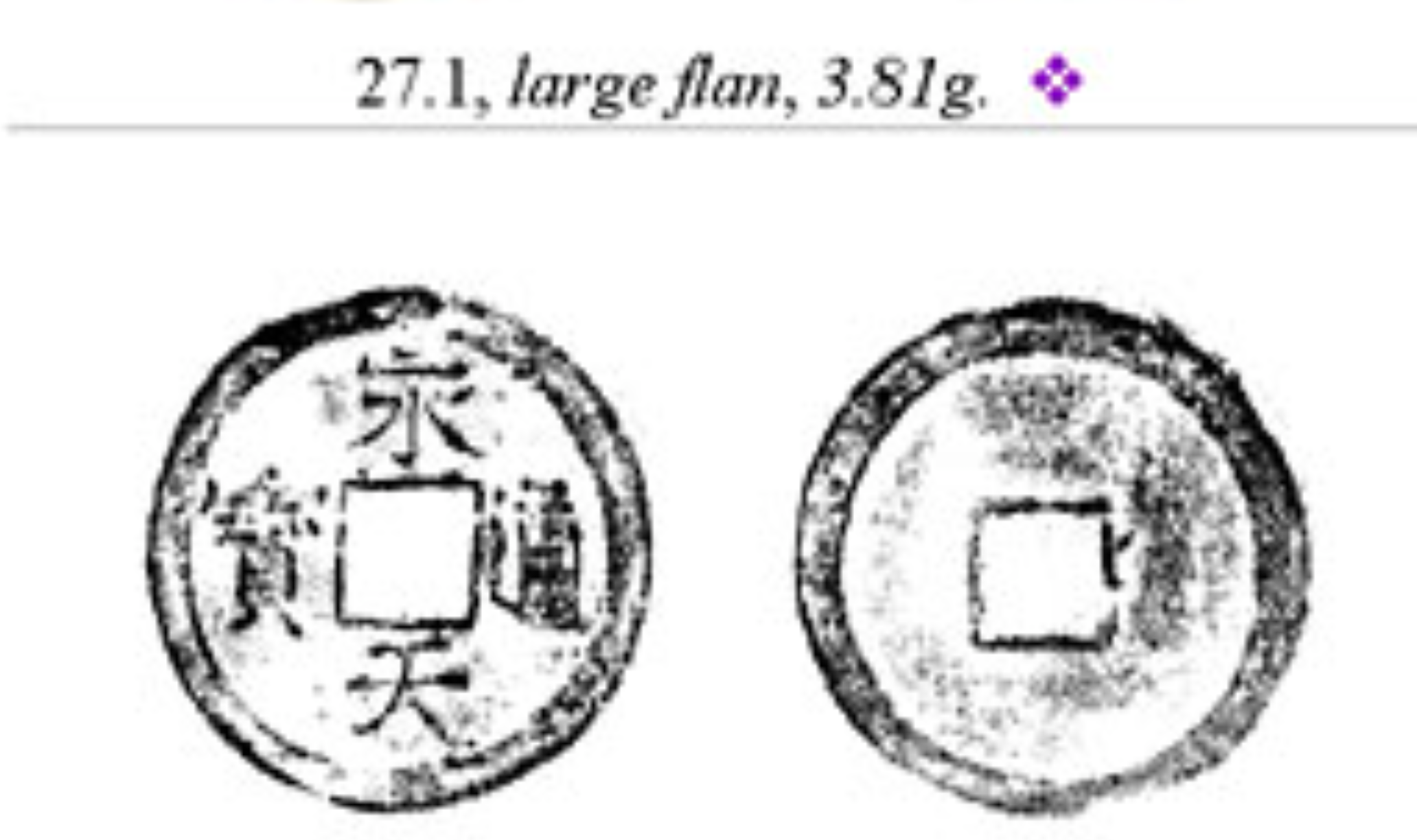
- Coins issued by Lê Ngã during his rebellion
Date	1420
Location	Bắc Giang, Jiaozhi Province, Ming China (in modern-day Northern Vietnam)
Result	Ming victory

Belligerents
Viet anti-Ming rebels	Ming dynasty

Commanders and leaders
Lê Ngã (Note: In Chinese records, he was called Li Hung (黎餓).)	Li Bin

Strength
Unknown	Unknown

The Lê Ngã rebellion of 1420, also known as the uprising of Lê Ngã, was a rebellion against the Chinese Ming dynasty led by a former Viet slave named Lê Ngã, during the Fourth Era of Northern Domination.

In 1407, around 9,000 Viet elitists, including scholars, craftmen, physicians, medicine experts were shipped to China proper, where these people were retrained in Chinese and could be sent back to Jiaozhi as bureaucrats. In addition, 7,700 Viet tradesmen, artisans and workers were sent to Beijing, the second capital of Ming Empire to build the Forbidden City, while the Ming state took direct control over Đại Việt's metal mines, precious aromatics and pearls.

In 1420, Lê Ngã rallied people to the woods of Lạng Sơn and subsequently declared king. He said to his followers, "If you want to be rich, follow me!" The rebels marched down the Red River Delta, seized Xương Giang. Lê Ngã's former slave owner saw Ngã and attacked him. The Ming military commander of Jiaozhi–Marquis Li Bin, arrived and forced Lê Ngã's rebels to flee into the mountains. After hearing the news, the Yongle Emperor felt angry and demanded that Lê Ngã be captured and transported to the Ming capital. Unable to immediately have the emperor's demand succeed, Li Bin seized and sent an innocent man instead, claiming that it was Lê Ngã.

Lê Ngã would not surrender until Huang Fu–the surveillance and prosecution commissioner of Jiaozhi, intervened.
