= Siege of Gerger =

Military conflict in Turkey, 1464–1465

Date	1463/64–1465
Location	Adıyaman, Gerger
Result	Aq Qoyunlu–Kurdish victory
Territorial changes	Mamluks cede Harput to Aq Qoyunlu

Belligerents
Aq Qoyunlu; Pazuki Kurds	Mamluk Sultanate

Commanders and leaders
Uzun Hasan; Bicenoğlu Süleyman; İbrahim Akabey	Governor of Gerger †

Siege of Gerger was a military conflict in 1464–1465 where Aq Qoyunlu forces, under Uzun Hasan, captured Gerger castle from the Mamluks after breaking their siege. The event was part of the broader power struggles between regional powers in Eastern Anatolia and the Levant during the mid-15th century.

== Prelude ==
Relations between Uzun Hasan and Cairo deteriorated after the death of the Mamluk sultan Inal and the accession of Khushqadam in 1461. The new sultan suspected Uzun Hasan of sheltering Janim al-Ashrafi, the former rebellious governor of Damascus, who had fled to Aq Qoyunlu territory. Although Khushqadam first ordered an expedition against Uzun Hasan, Janim’s murder in Aq Qoyunlu-held Urfa a few months later persuaded him to recall his army.

Tension eased when the Pazuki Kurds of Adıyaman—especially those in Gerger, which commanded the Aleppo–Erzincan road, killed the local Mamluk governor and seized Gerger Castle, sending its keys to Uzun Hasan in 1464. (Some sources date the event to 1463.)

== Siege ==
Khushqadam appointed a new governor to Gerger, but the Kurds didn't let him enter. The sultan dispatched a Mamluk army to besiege the castle; fierce resistance caused heavy casualties on both sides. The Kurds appealed to Uzun Hasan, who in 1465 marched north, routed the besieging force, and occupied the town.

Alarmed by the defeat, Khushqadam agreed to peace: the Mamluks turned over Harput to Uzun Hasan, while the Aq Qoyunlu returned Gerger to the governor of Aleppo.

== Aftermath ==
Encouraged by the agreement, Uzun Hasan launched a campaign against the Dulkadirids to secure Harput. He sent commanders Bicenoğlu Süleyman and İbrahim Akabey from Gerger, but Dulkadirid ruler Malik Arslan defeated them and took both captive. Uzun Hasan then marched in person, captured Harput, and besieged Elbistan, compelling Malik Arslan to cede Harput and free the prisoners.

The heavy defeat damaged Malik Arslan’s prestige; later that year he was assassinated while praying in a mosque.

== See also ==
- Aq Qoyunlu
- Mamluk Sultanate
- Dulkadirids
- Uzun Hasan
- History of Anatolia
