= Edessa Campaigns (1429–1433) =

15th-century military campaigns

Aq Qoyunlu–Mamluk War (1429–1433)
- Part of Aq Qoyunlu–Mamluk Wars
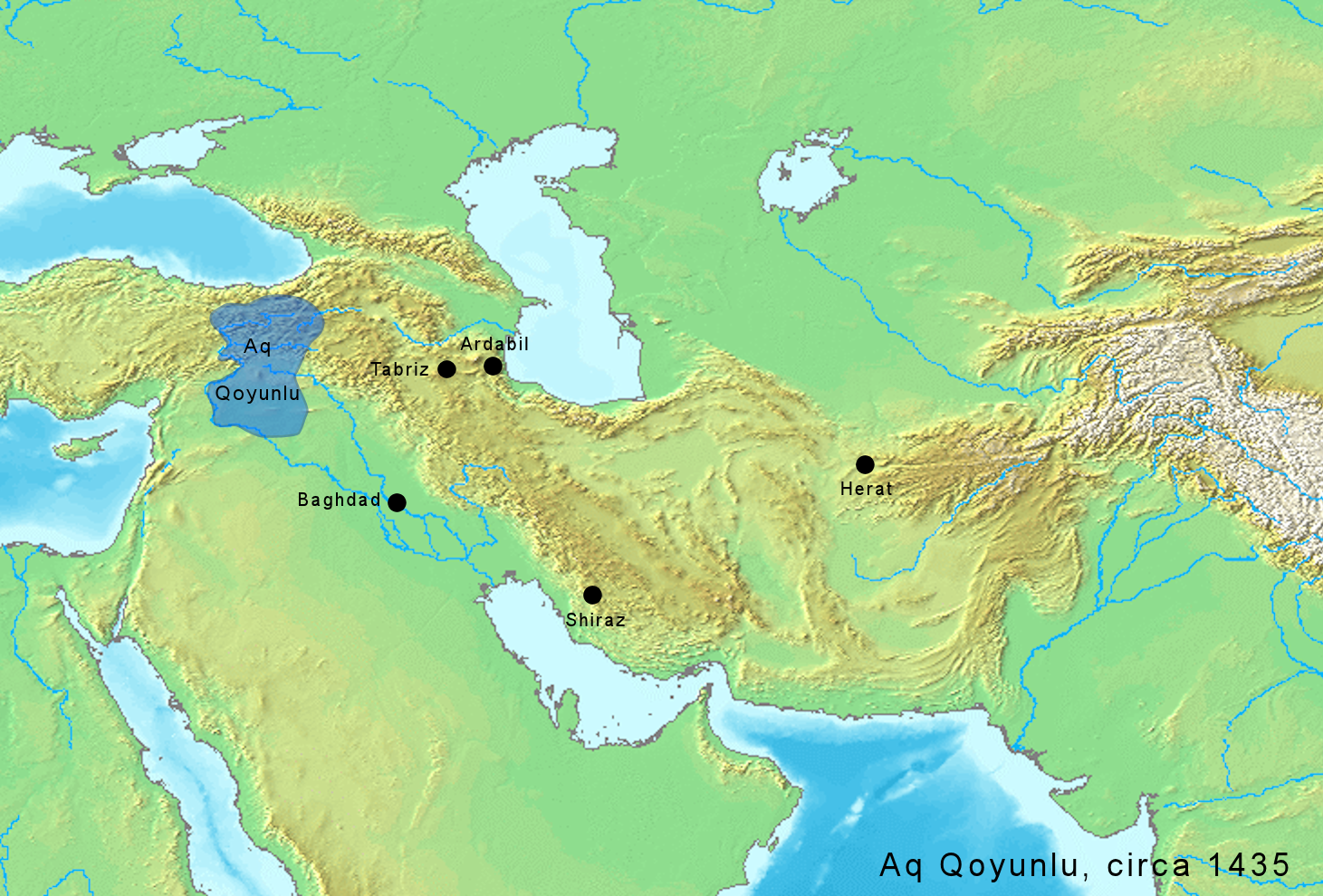
- Aq Qoyunlu during the reign of Uthman Beg
Date	1429–1433
Location	Eastern Anatolia, Urfa, Amid
Result	Mamluk victory: Temporary vassalization of Aq Qoyunlu
Territorial changes	Urfa annexed by Mamluks

Belligerents
Mamluk Sultanate	Aq Qoyunlu

Commanders and leaders
(Mamluk Sultanate) Barsbay (Mamluk Sultanate) Akboğa et-Temrâzî (Mamluk Sultanate) Temraz al-Kirmishi (Mamluk Sultanate) Aynal al-Jakamî (Mamluk Sultanate) Sayf al-Din Inal (Mamluk Sultanate) Tagrıbirmiş	Uthman Beg (surrendered); Ali bey (POW); Hâbil bey (POW) # Murad Bey †; İskander Bey †; Qara Muhammad (executed)

Casualties and losses
Very heavy	Very heavy: 20 prisoners executed

Edessa Campaigns or Aq Qoyunlu–Mamluk War (1429–1433) was a series of military campaigns fought between the Aq Qoyunlu and the Mamluk Sultanate. The conflict started with Aq Qoyunlu raids into Mamluk territories, which prompted the Mamluks to invade. After capturing Urfa and besieging Amid, the Mamluks were eventually forced into a long stalemate. Ultimately, Uthman Beg, the ruler of the Aq Qoyunlu, decided to surrender, and the Aq Qoyunlu became a temporary vassal of the Mamluks. However, the peace treaty was broken shortly after, and the Aq Qoyunlu regained their independence.

== Background ==
In 1429, Aq Qoyunlu ruler Uthman Beg captured Harput, making his son Ali Bey governor of the area, and sent his other son Hâbil Bey to lead several raids into Jazira. As a result, the Mamluks mobilized an army and started a campaign against the Aq Qoyunlu.

== Campaigns ==
=== First campaign ===
In response to the raids, the Mamluks under Tagrıbirmiş occupied Ruha (modern-day Urfa) and sacked the city, killing most of the population and Aq Qoyunlu army. Both Ali Bey, Hâbil Bey and Qara Muhammad were captured by the Mamluks, and Hâbil Bey died in captivity in 1430 while Qara Muhammad was executed in 1433. Shortly after Hâbil Bey's death Uthman Beg attacked Urfa and raided Mardin, Malatya and Aintab but after hearing that a Mamluk army of 1500 people under Akboğa et-Temrâzî, Temraz al-Kirmishi and Aynal al-Jakamî was coming towards him, he fled without a fight and failed to take Urfa back.

=== Second campaign (Siege of Amid) ===
After the failed campaign, the Mamluks occupied Urfa for 5 years and besieged Amid in 1433, but the castle resisted and could not be captured. The Mamluk soldiers were demoralized and very dissatisfied because of this long campaign and the castle's failure to surrender. Eventually, after a long stalemate, Uthman Beg decided to surrender and made peace with the Mamluks, where Aq Qoyunlu became a Mamluk vassal ending the campaign as a pyrrhic Mamluk victory.

== Aftermath ==
The terms of peace were as follows:

1) Kiss the ground before the sultan.

2) Arrange for the “khutba and the sikka;” that is, ensure that the Friday sermon was dedicated to, and coins struck in the name of, Sultan Barsbay throughout Qara Yulluk’s lands.

3) Not interfere in the sultan’s domains, from Divrigi to Urfa.

4) Not interfere with the subjects or governors of Hasankeyf.

5) Not interfere with the governor of Egil or his citadels.

6) Not interfere with merchants, pilgrims, or other travellers passing through his lands, nor to interfere with facilities constructed for their use. Rather, he was obliged to protect merchants and facilitate their movement.

This treaty was broken by the Aq Qoyunlu shortly after, and the country remained independent. The Mamluk ruler, who regretted his expedition, did not take any new action against the Aq Qoyunlu.

== See also ==
- Mamluk Sultanate
- Aq Qoyunlu
