= Egyptian–Ottoman War =

Egyptian–Ottoman War may refer to:

- Ottoman–Mamluk War (1485–1491)
- Ottoman–Mamluk War (1516–1517)
- Egyptian–Ottoman War (1831–1833)
- Egyptian–Ottoman War (1839–1841)
- Sinai and Palestine campaign

== See also ==
- Ottoman–Mamluk War (disambiguation)
