= Ottoman–Mamluk War =

Ottoman–Mamluk War may refer to:

- Ottoman–Mamluk War (1485–91)
- Ottoman–Mamluk War (1516–17)

== See also ==
- Egyptian–Ottoman War (disambiguation)
