= Hamza Bey Bayandur =

- Bey
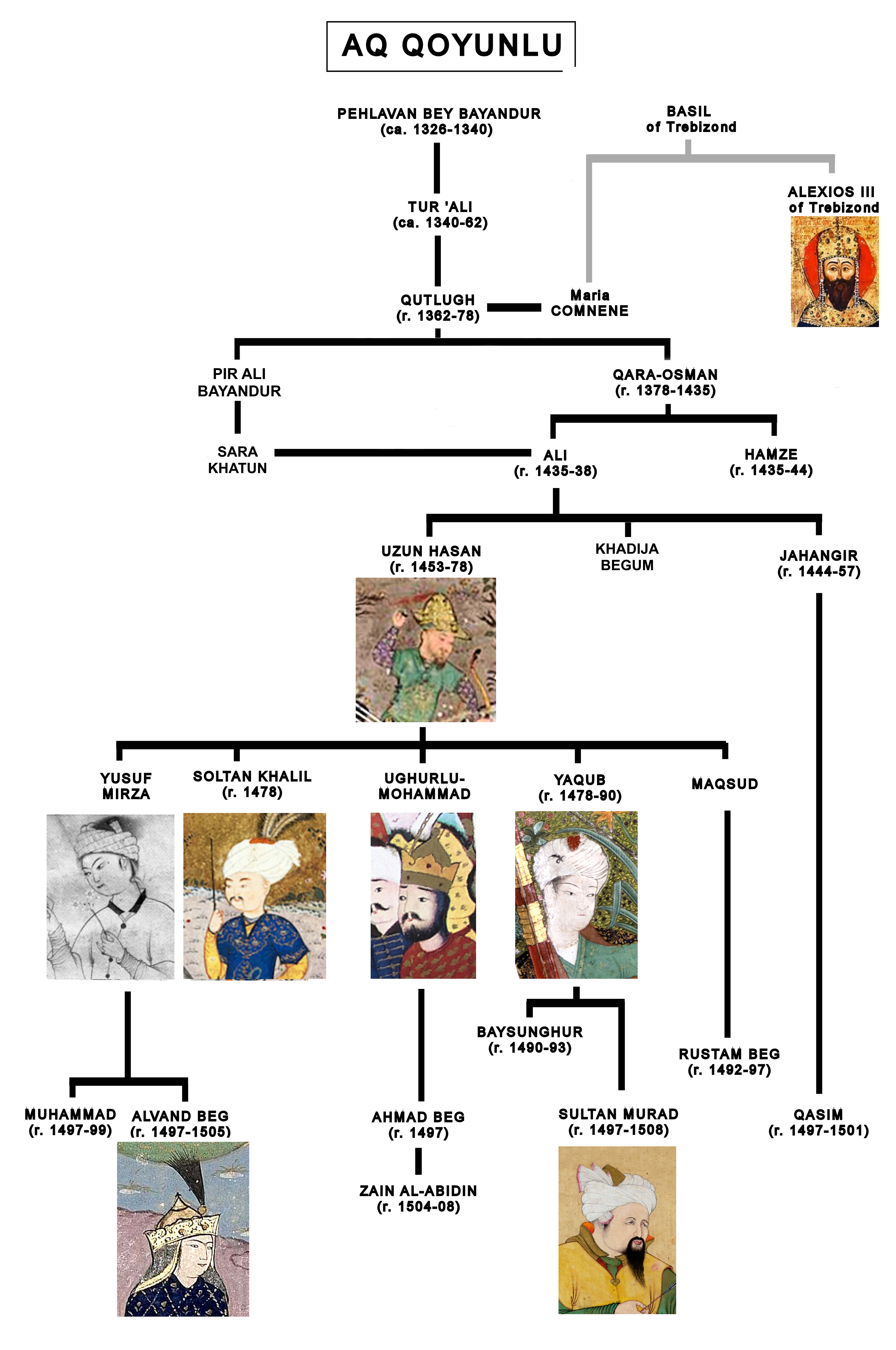
- Aq Qoyunlu genealogy.
- Reign: 1438-1444
- Predecessor: Ali Aq Qoyunlu
- Successor: Jahangir Aq Qoyunlu
- Died: 1444
- Dynasty: Aq Qoyunlu
- Father: Qara Yuluk Uthman Beg

Hamza Bey Bayandur (r.1438-1444) was a son of Qara Yuluk Uthman Beg, who ruled the Aq Qoyunlu for six years. He succeeded his brother Ali Aq Qoyunlu, before being replaced by his nephew Jahangir Aq Qoyunlu.

Hamza initially served as the governor of Mardin (1432–35), before becoming the ruler of the Aq Qoyunlu Principality (1438–44). To establish his power, he relied on the Christian communities of Amid and Mardin, which often led to opposition from Muslim writers.

In the early summer of 1437, Hamza obtained military successes against the Qara Quyunlu governor of Baghdad, Ispan b. Qara Yusuf, who was attempting to expand his territory at the expense of the Aq Qoyunlus.

== Sources ==
- Woods, John E. (1999). The Aqquyunlu: Clan, Confederation, Empire. New York.
