= Ali Aq Qoyunlu =

Bey of the Turkoman tribal federation

Mirza Ali Beg
- Mirza; Beg

Sultan of the Aq Qoyunlu
- Reign: 1435–1438
- Predecessor: Osman Beg
- Successor: Sultan Hamza
- Died: 1444
- Wife: Sara Khatun
- Issue: Uzun Hasan; Jahangir Mirza; Husein; Jahan Shah; Iskander; Ibrahim; Uveys; Khadija Begum
Names
- Jalal ud-Din Ali ibn Kara Yuluk Osman
- Dynasty: Aq Qoyunlu
- Father: Osman Beg
- Mother: Uncertain
- Religion: Sunni Islam

Jalal ud-Din Ali ibn Kara Yuluk Osman (Persian: جلال الدین علی بن قره یولوق عثمان), or Mirza Ali Beg (Azerbaijani: میرزا علی بیگ) was the sixth bey of the Turkoman tribal confederation of the Aq Qoyunlu from 1435 to 1438.

== Life ==
Jalal ud-Din Ali ibn Kara Yuluk Osman was born into the Bayandur tribe of the Aq Qoyunlu confederation. He was the third son of Osman Beg (1350–1435), leader of the Aq Qoyunlu. He married his cousin, Sara Khatun. They had seven sons and one daughter, including Uzun Hasan and Jahangir Mirza, as well as Khadija Begum, who later married Shaykh Junayd of the Safavid dynasty.

In 1435, after the death of his father in the Battle of Erzurum, Ali became the new ruler of Aq Qoyunlu, since his two older brothers had already died at that time. The Timurid crown prince Muhammad Juki had recognized Ali Beg the ruler of Âmid (modern-day Diyarbakır) and as the bey of the Aq Qoyunlu. However, Ali encountered the opposition of his brothers, uncles, and cousins. His cousin Kilij Arslan Bayandur, who ruled Palu in modern-day Elazığ, wanted to take over the beylik with the help of Qara Iskander of the Kara Koyunlu, but he could not succeed. On the other hand, when his brother Sultan Hamza, who was controlling Mardin and was supported by his others brothers, Mehmet and Mahmut, and his mother, Seljuk Hatun, captured Âmid, he was recognized as "great bey" by several Aq Qoyunlu princes. Ali Beg, now pushed out of the capital, went to his brother Yakub, who was the ruler of Erzincan and Karahisar. Ali's sons Husein, Jahangir and Uzun Hasan also joined their father's ranks. However, since nothing could be done against Hamza, Ali had to take shelter in the Ottoman Sultan Murad II. Murad II gave him İskilip as dirlik, but he did not stay there long and went to his sons in Erzincan. Ali abdicated and went into voluntary exile in Aleppo in January 1439, and remained there until his death. Ḥamza was then the most powerful Aq Qoyunlu chief, but he died in 1444. The struggle for leadership resumed between Shaikh Hasan, and Jahangir.

== Family ==
By Sara Khatun he had seven sons and a daughter:

- Jahangir Mirza Beg
- Uzun Hasan Mirza Beg
- Hussein Beg
- Jahanshah Beg
- Iskander Beg
- Ibrahim Beg
- Uveysh Beg
- Khadija Beyim Khatun. She married Shaykh Junayd of Safavid dynasty between 1456 and 1459. Their son, Haydar Safavi, married his cousin Alamshah Halima Khatun, daughter of Uzun Hassan and Teodora Despina Khatun, and was father of Ismail I and grandfather of Tahmasp I.

== Sources ==
- Roy, Kaushik (2014). Military Transition in Early Modern Asia, 1400-1750. Bloomsbury. p. 288. ISBN 978-1-78093-765-6.
- Babinger, Franz (1992). Braddock Hickman, Walter (ed.). Mehmed the Conqueror and His Time (2nd ed.). Princeton University Press. ISBN 978-0-691-01078-6.
- Woods, John E. (1999). The Aqquyunlu: Clan, Confederation, Empire. New York.
- Erdem, Ilhan (2005). "The Aq-qoyunlu State from the Death of Osman Beg to Uzun Hasan Beg (1435–1456)". Khazar Journal of Humanities and Social Sciences. 8 (3–4). Khazar University Press.
- Sümer, Faruk (1989). "Akkoyunlular". İslâm Ansiklopedisi (in Turkish). Turkiye Diyanet Foundation.

Preceded by Uthman Beg	Ruler of the Aq Qoyunlu; 1435-1438	Succeeded by Hamza
