= Qara Yuluk Uthman Beg =

Uthman Beg
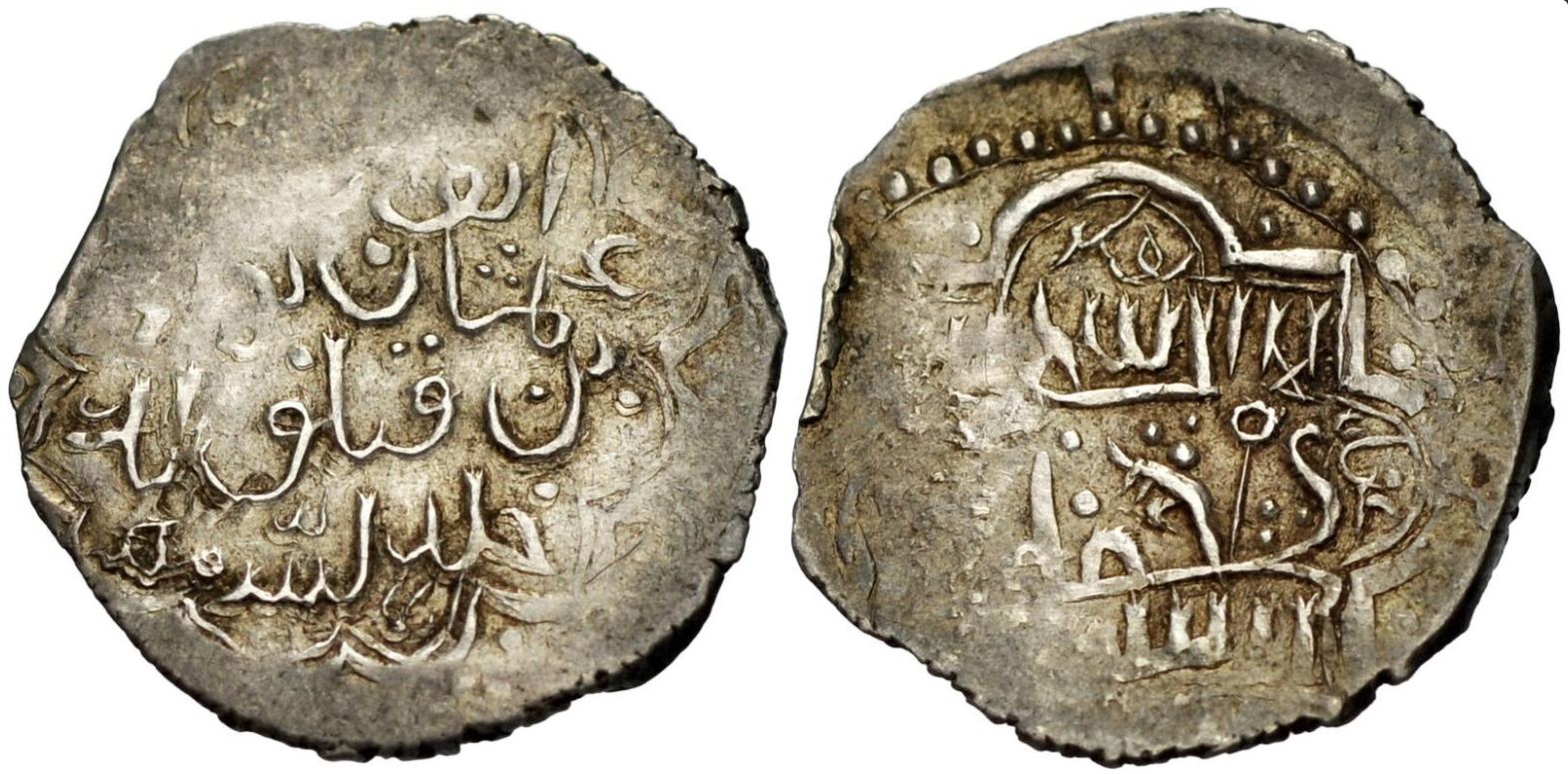
- Coinage of Qara Yülük Uthman Beg. AH 805-839 1403-1435 CE

Leader of the Aq Qoyunlu
- Reign: 1378 – 1435
- Predecessor: Fakhr-ud-Din Qutlugh
- Successor: Ali Beg
- Born: c. 1356
- Died: 1435 (aged 78–79)
- Wives: Saljuq; Unnamed daughter of Alexios III of Trebizond, possibly married in 1422. Unnamed niece of Rustam ibn Tarkhan
- Issue: Ibrahim Bey; Abel Bey; Jalaladdin Ali Bey; Hamza Bey; Uveys Bey; Hasan Bey; Yakub Bey; Ruqaya Sultan
Names
- Baha-ud-Din Qara Yuluk Osman
- Dynasty: Aq Qoyunlu
- Father: Fakhr-ud-Din Qutlugh
- Mother: Maria Comnene of Trebizond (likely).

Uthman Beg or Osman Beg (Azerbaijani: Qara Yuluq Osman Bəy; Turkish: Kara Yülük Osman Bey; 1356 – 1435) was a late 14th and early 15th-century leader of the Turkoman tribal federation of Aq Qoyunlu in what is now eastern Turkey, Iran, Azerbaijan and Iraq.

== Name ==
He was born Baha-ud-Din Uthman and was later given the nickname Qara Iluk or Qara Yuluk meaning The Black Leech. However, John E. Woods argues that this interpretation is doubtful since "leech" in modern Turkish is sülük, not yülük, which means cleanshaven or smooth.

== Early life ==
Uthman Beg was the son of Fakhr al-Din Qutlugh, likely by his Greek wife, Maria, sister of Alexios III of Trebizond, although this remains uncertain. He is estimated to have been born c. 1356. According to Byzantine and Aq Qoyunlu sources, he had several wives, a wife named Saljuq, an unnamed niece of Rustam ibn Tarkhan, and a maternal cousin who was daughter of Alexios III of Trebizond and his consort Theodora Kantakouzene.

He was afraid of the intentions of his brothers, Ahmed and Pir Ali when they joined Kadi Burhan al-Din of Sivas. He eventually killed his opponents and took over their territories in 1398 but retreated from Erzinjan on the arrival of the Ottomans under Süleyman Çelebi.

== Reign ==
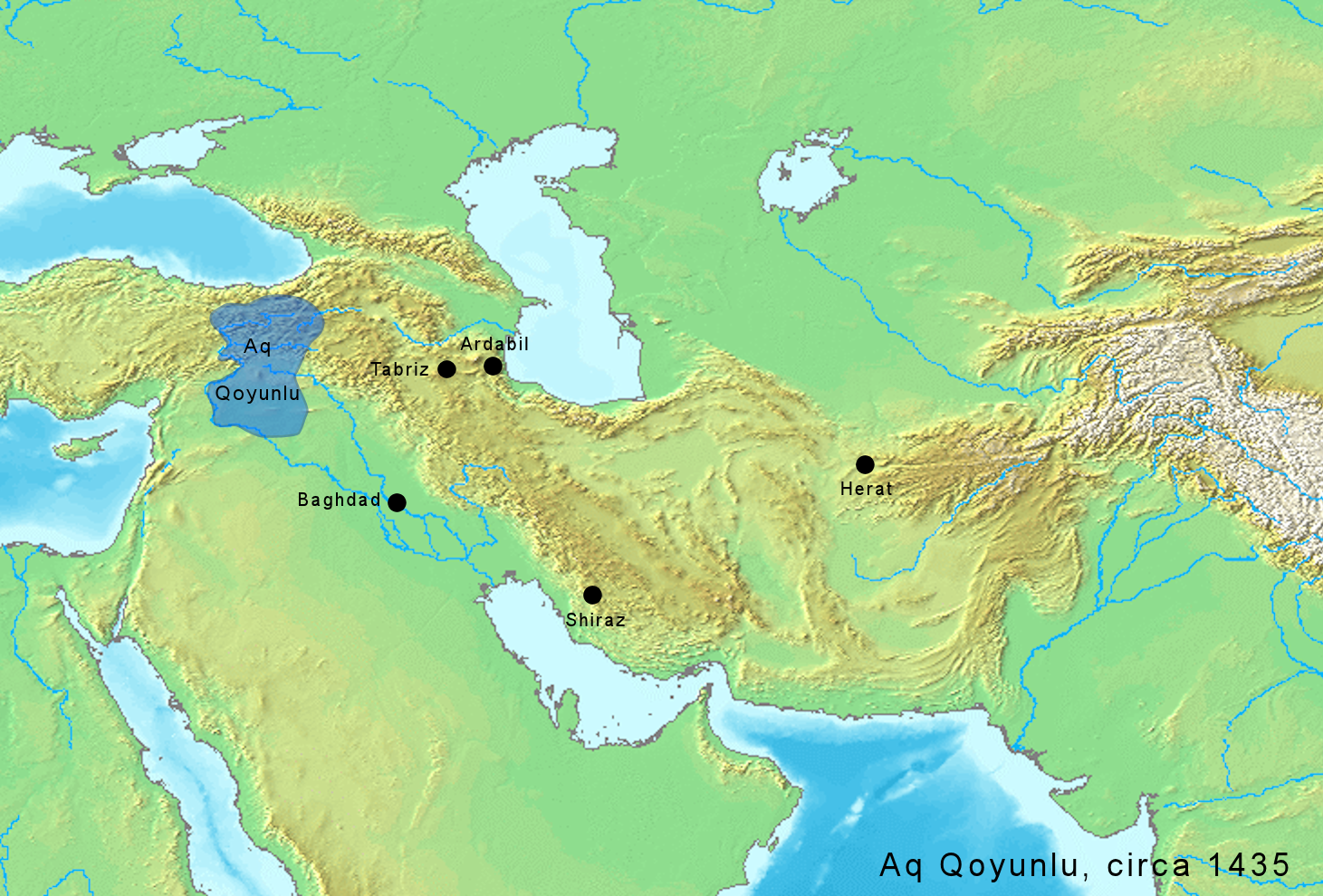
Aq Qoyunlu domains, circa 1435

When Timur invaded the Caucasus and eastern Anatolia, the Aq Qoyunlu sided with him in support and fought alongside the Timurids against the Ottomans. For his services, Uthman Beg was given Diyarbakır in 1402. After this expedition, he tried to consolidate his dominance in Southeastern and Eastern Anatolia. In 1407, further increased his reputation by defeating Mamluk emirs. However, he failed against Qara Yusuf, who conquered Azerbaijan by defeating Timur's grandson Abu Bakr. In 1412, he was defeated by Qara Yusuf near Ergani. When he was defeated by Qara Yusuf again in 1417, he made a peace agreement with him, which lasted one year. In 1418, he besieged and pillaged Mardin causing Qara Yusuf to march on him again. He was defeated and fled to Aleppo. Two years later, he besieged Erzincan and defeated Yakub, son of Qara Yusuf. In 1421, he tried to take Mardin again but was defeated by Qara Iskandar. He further expanded his territory by talking Urfa and Erzincan. He divided his land by giving Bayburt to his nephew Qutlu Beg, Tercan to his other nephew and Şebinkarahisar to his son Yaqub. He also took Harput from the Dulkadirids, which he gave to his son Ali Beg. In 1429, Mamluks plundered Urfa and its surrounding, and even captured one of Uthman's sons, Hâbil Beg, who died in the capital Cairo in 1430. The same year Mamluk Sultan Barsbay marched on Amid, however Mamluks did not achieve a significant success. In 1432, he conquered Mardin. In 1434, upon Qara Iskandar's plunder of Shirvan, Khalilullah I asked help from Uthman Beg. He besieged and took Erzurum from the Qara Qoyunlu and gave the city to his son Sheikh Hasan. In August 1435, he was defeated by Qara Iskandar in the vicinity of Erzurum, and died soon after.

== Legacy ==
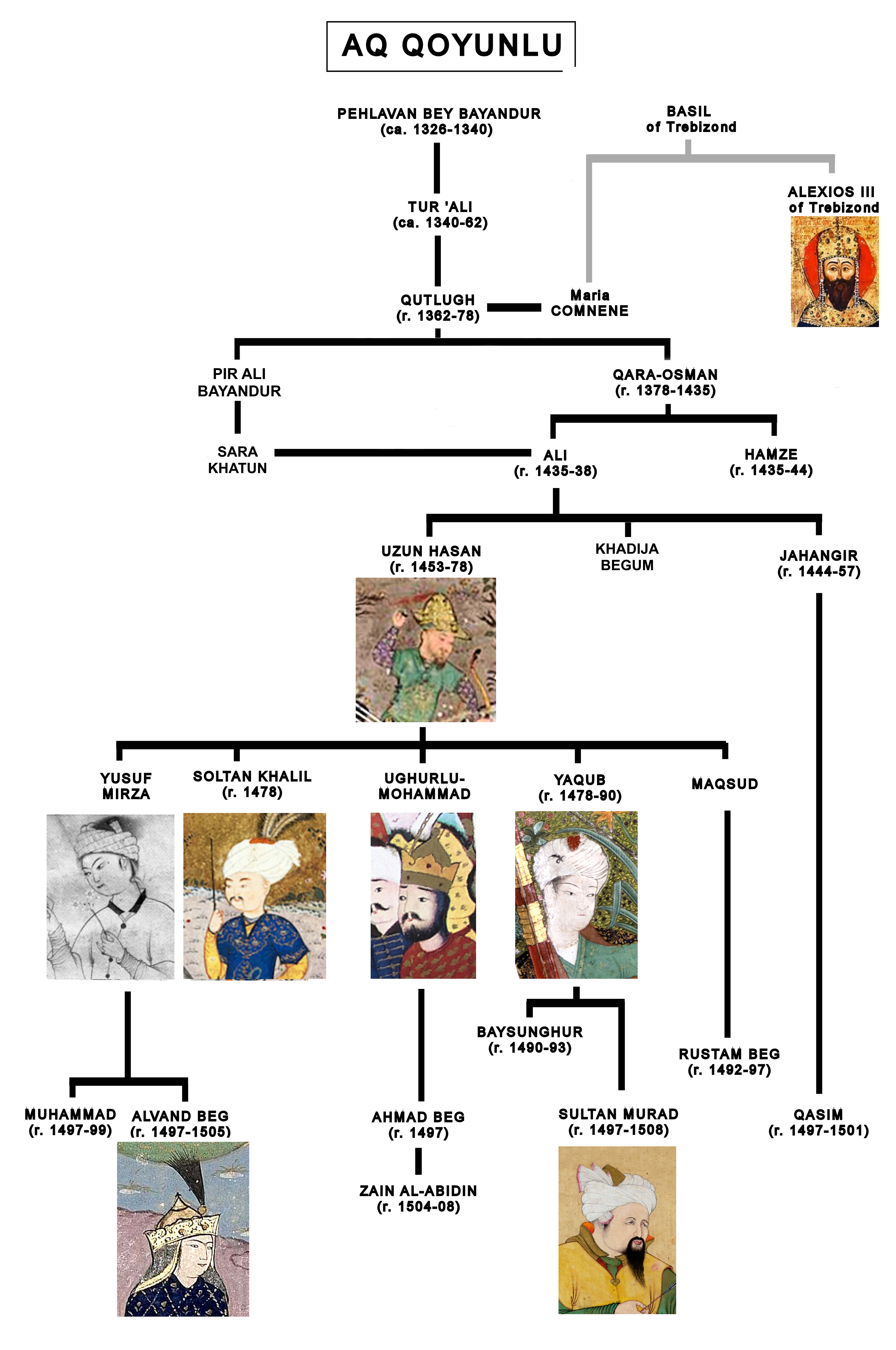
Genealogy of the Aq Qoyunlu dynasty

The transformation of the Aq Qoyunlu tribal confederation into a regional power took place under Uthman Beg. As he augmented his power, he also started to develop the foundations of a Perso-Islamic administration. However, at the same time, he maintained a strong attachment to his own nomadic roots, as well to his Turkic roots from Central Asia. This is exemplified in the occurrence where he urged his followers to respect the validating force of Oghuz heritage, quoting the yasak (a traditional body of unwritten laws) in the process. This message of caution by Uthman Beg to his followers bears similarities to Genghis Khan's yasa, or the concept of the Mongol törah that Babur referred to when he made mention of some inherited Mongol traditions of his Timurid cousins.

Uthman Beg also warned his followers not to adopt a sedentary city life, for he believed it would lead to the disappearance of "sovereignty, Turkishness and liberty". Genghis Khan had once warned his Mongol followers with the same sort message. These remarks by Uthman Beg were contemporaneous with Ottoman Sultan Murad II's attempts aimed at re-energizing his own dynasty's Central Asian Oghuz roots, which, in light of the devastating Ottoman defeat at Ankara, was deemed necessary by him in order to strengthen Ottoman authority.

Uthman Beg's grandson Uzun Hasan would be the first Aq Qoyunlu ruler to openly disembark on a campaign aimed at transforming the Aq Qoyunlu tribal confederation into a Perso-Islamic sultanate.

== Issue ==
He had seven known sons:

- Ibrahim Bey (died 1408);
- Abel Bey - was captured by the Mamluks in 1429;
- Ali Bey;
- Hamza Bey;
- Uveys Bey;
- Hasan Bey;
- Yakub Bey;

He had a known daughter:

- Ruqaya Sultan, married in 1401 to Siddi Ahmad, son of Miran Shah;

== Sources ==
- Langaroodi, Reza Rezazadeh; Negahban, Farzin (2008). "Āq-qūyūnlū". In Madelung, Wilferd; Daftary, Farhad (eds.). Encyclopaedia Islamica Online. Brill Online. ISSN 1875-9831.
- Woods, John E. (1999). The Aqquyunlu: Clan, Confederation, Empire (Revised and Expanded ed.). University of Utah Press. ISBN 978-0874805659.

Preceded by Ahmed bin Qutlugh	Ruler of the Aq Qoyunlu; 1378-1435	Succeeded by Ali Beg
