= Jahangir Aq Qoyunlu =

Beg of Aq Qoyunlu from 1444 to 1454

Jahangir
- Bey
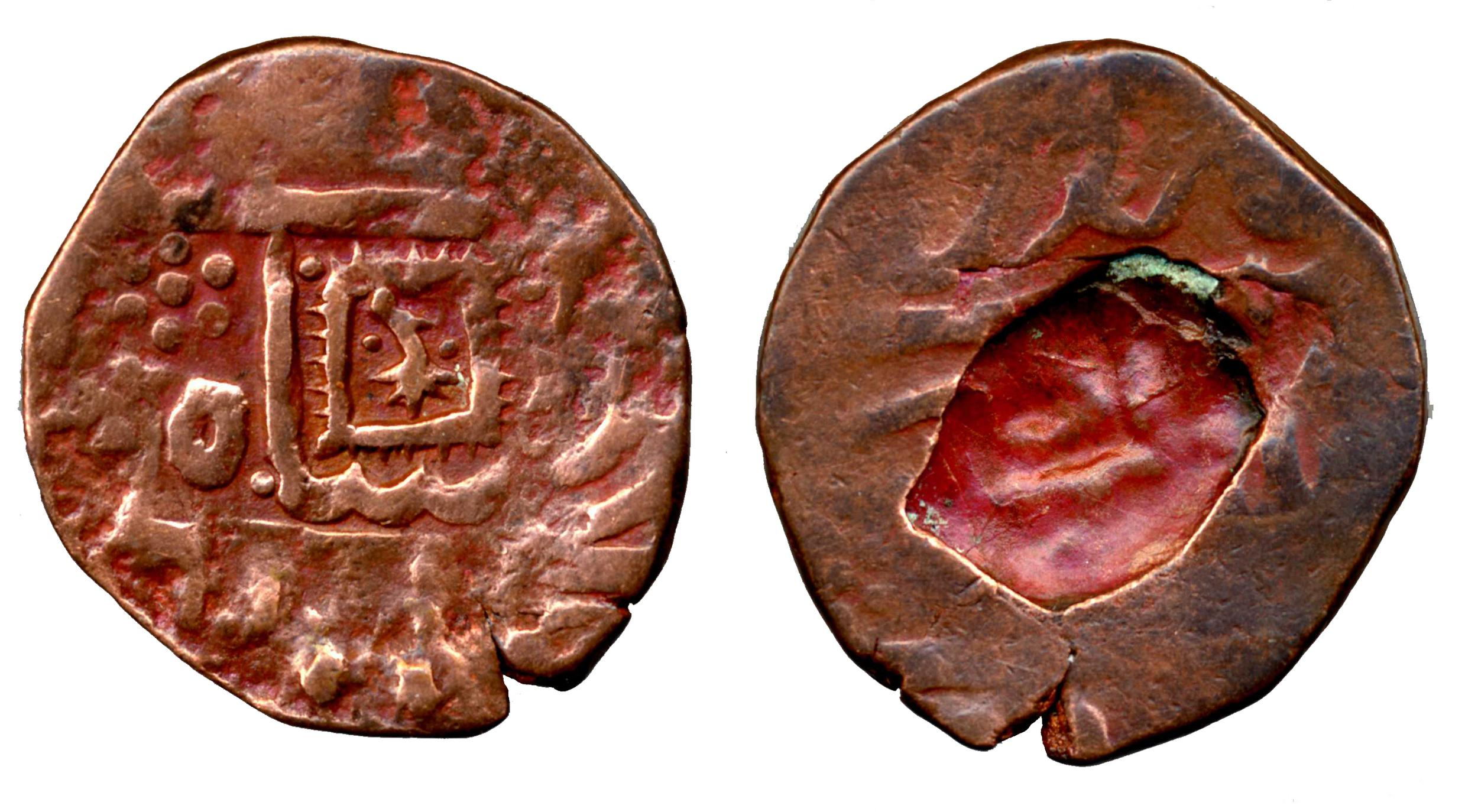
- Coin of Jahangir
- Reign: 1444–1454
- Predecessor: Bey Tur-Ali
- Successor: Uzun Hasan
- Died: 1454
- Dynasty: Aq Qoyunlu
- Father: Ali Aq Qoyunlu

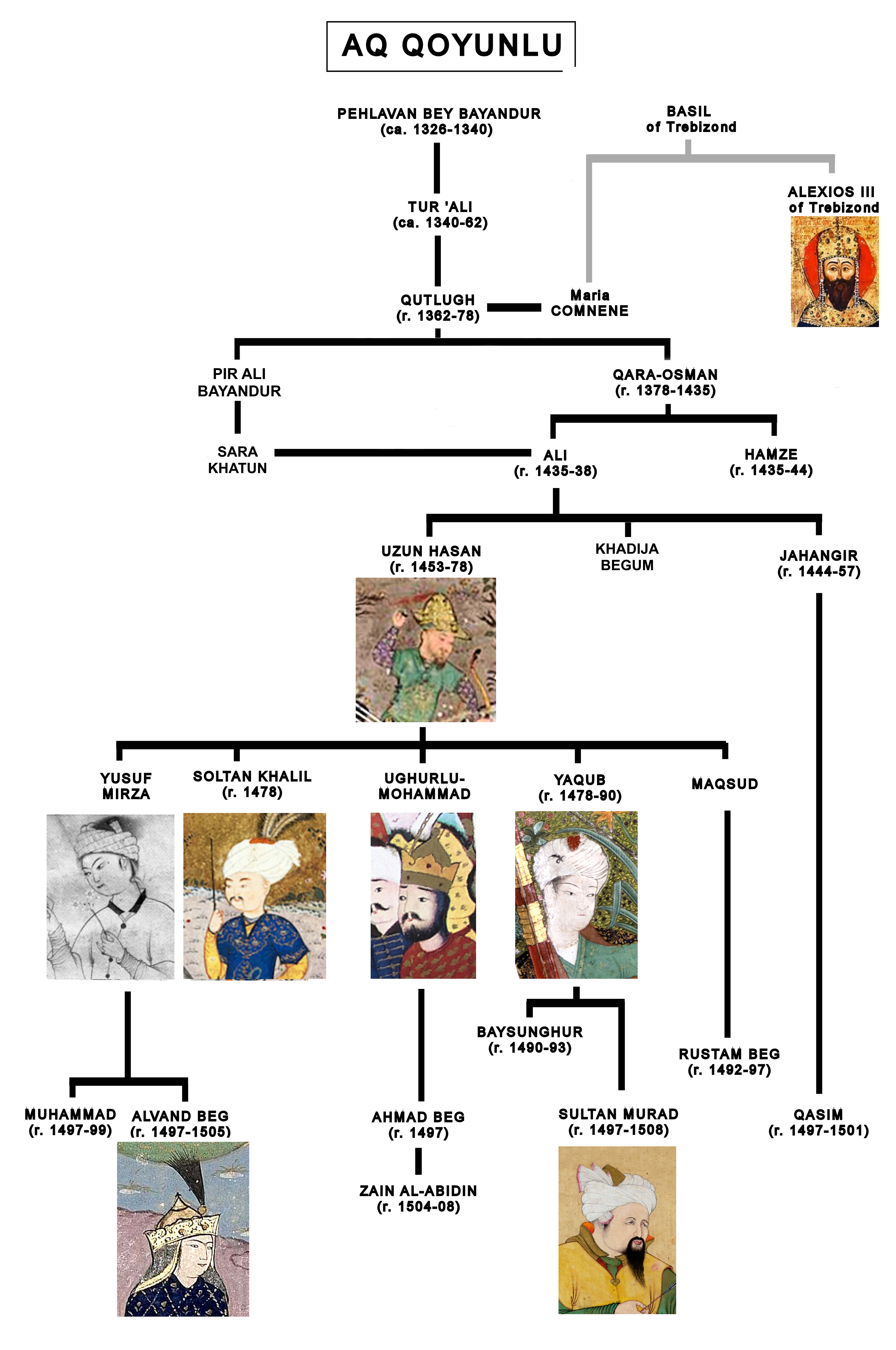
Genealogy of the Aq Qoyunlu dynasty

Jahangir (Persian: جهانگیر) was the uncontested leader of the Aq Qoyunlu from 1444 to 1454. He was a son of Ali Aq Qoyunlu. Afterwards, he fell into a dynastic struggle with his younger brother Uzun Hasan, who by 1457 had defeated him and assumed full power over the confederation. Jahangir later died in 1469.

One of his descendants, Qasim Bey, would briefly rule from 1497-1501, during a period of dynastic struggle.

== Sources ==
- Langaroodi, Reza Rezazadeh; Negahban, Farzin (2008). "Āq-qūyūnlū". In Madelung, Wilferd; Daftary, Farhad (eds.). Encyclopaedia Islamica Online. Brill Online. ISSN 1875-9831.
- Minorsky, V. & Bosworth, C.E. (1965). "Uzun Ḥasan". In Lewis, B.; Pellat, Ch. & Schacht, J. (eds.). The Encyclopaedia of Islam, Second Edition. Volume II: C–G. Leiden: E. J. Brill. OCLC 495469475.
- Quiring-Zoche, R. (1986). "Āq Qoyunlū". Encyclopædia Iranica, online edition, Vol. II, Fasc. 2. New York. pp. 163–168.
- Roemer, H. R. (1986). "The Turkmen dynasties". In Lockhart, Laurence; Jackson, Peter (eds.). The Cambridge History of Iran: The Timurid and Safavid Periods. Vol. 6. Cambridge: Cambridge University Press. ISBN 0-521-20094-6.
- Savory, R. M. (2009). "The Struggle for Supremacy in Persia after the death of Tīmūr". Der Islam. 40. De Gruyter: 35–65. doi:10.1515/islm.1964.40.1.35. S2CID 162340735.
