= Qul (Turkic) =

Qul (Azerbaijani: qul; Kazakh: құл, romanized: qūl; Kyrgyz: кул, romanized: kul; Tatar: кол, romanized: qol; Turkish: kul; Turkmen: gul; Uzbek: қул, romanized: qul) is a word of Turkic origin meaning 'slave'.

== Uses of the word ==
=== In Central Asia, Azerbaijan, Iran and South Asia ===
In Central Asia, Azerbaijan, Iran and South Asia, the word qul has been used as the second part of several Muslim male given names, where it is used with the possessive in Azerbaijani (qulu), Tatar (колый qolıy), Turkmen (guly) and Uzbek (quli), and has been borrowed as قلی (qoli) in Persian and قلی (qulī) in Urdu.

List of given names derived from qul

- Abbas Quli
- Ahmad Quli
- Alim Quli, notably borne by
  - Alimqul
- Ali Quli
- Allah Quli
- Bayan Quli, notably borne by
  - Bayan Qulï
- Hasan Quli
- Husayn Quli
- Ibrahim Quli, notably borne by
  - Ibrahim Quli Qutb Shah Wali
- Imam Quli
- Iman Quli
- Ishan Quli, notably borne by
  - Işanguly Nuryýew
- Jafar Quli
- Jamshid Quli, notably borne by
  - Jamsheed Quli Qutb Shah
- Mahdi Quli
- Makhdum Quli, notably borne by
  - Magtymguly Pyragy
- Muhammad Quli
- Murshid Quli, notably borne by
  - Murshid Quli Khan
- Murtada Quli
- Najaf Quli
- Qurban Quli
- Rida Quli
- Safi Quli
- Shah Quli
- Subhan Quli, notably borne by
  - Subhan Quli Qutb Shah
- Sultan Quli, notably borne by
  - Sultan Quli Qutb-ul-Mulk
- Tahmasb Quli

List of surnames derived from qul

- as first element:
  - Azerbaijani: Quliyev, Qululu, Qulusoylu, Quluzadə
  - Kazakh: Құлов, romanized: Qūlov
  - Kyrgyz: Кулов, romanized: Kulov
  - Persian: قلیزاده, romanized: Qolizâde
  - Turkmen: Gulyýew
- in compounds:
  - Azerbaijani: Əliquliyev (notably borne by Rasim Aliguliyev), İmanquliyev, Cəfərquliyev, Məmmədquluzadə (notably borne by Jalil Mammadguluzadeh), Rzaquliyev
  - Kazakh: Иманқұлов, romanized: İmanqūlov (notably borne by Ruslan Imankulov)

=== In the Ottoman Empire ===
In the Ottoman Empire, the word qul was used in rank names of the Janissaries such as kapıkulu and kul kethüdâsı.

== See also ==
- Abd (Arabic)
- Ghulam
