= Qutb Shah =

Qutb Shah may refer to:

- Qutub Shah, the mythological ancestor of the Punjabi Awan tribe
- Qutb Shahi dynasty of Golconda
  - Quli Qutb Shah (1485–1543), first Sultan of Golconda
  - Jamsheed Quli Qutb Shah (d. 1550), second Sultan of Golconda
  - Subhan Quli Qutb Shah (1543–1550), third Sultan of Golconda
  - Ibrahim Quli Qutb Shah Wali (1530–1580), fourth Sultan of Golconda
  - Muhammad Quli Qutb Shah (1565–1612), fifth Sultan of Golconda
  - Sultan Muhammad Qutb Shah (1593–1626), sixth Sultan of Golconda
  - Abdullah Qutb Shah (1614–1672), seventh Sultan of Golconda
  - Abul Hasan Qutb Shah (d. 1699), final Sultan of Golconda
  - Quli Qutb Shah Urban Development Authority
- Dawood Bin Qutubshah (1539–1612), 27th imam of the Dawoodi Bohras
- Mian Qutb Shah (died 1760), soldier based in Saharanpur
- Syed Ali Qutab Shah Rizvi, Sindhi politician

== See also ==
- Qutb
- Shah
