= Golconda Civil War =

Indian conflict, 1550

Date	January 22, 1550 – July 27, 1550
Location	Telangana, India
Result	Ibrahim Quli Qutub Shah Wali victory

Belligerents
Ibrahim's Faction; Supported by: Vijayanagara Empire; Berar Sultanate	Subhan's Faction

Commanders and leaders
Ibrahim Quli Qutub Shah Wali; Daulat Quli; Jaggadeva Rao; Mustafa Khan; Salabat Khan; Berar Sultanate : Tufal Khan; Vijaynagara Empire : Rama Raya; Venkatadri	Subhan Quli Qutb Shah; Saif Khan (AWOL); Jagat Rao (POW); Nanappa †; Khudawand Khan †

The Golconda Civil War was a fought in the first half of 1550 in the Sultanate of Golconda between Ibrahim Quli Qutb Shah Wali and Saif Khan Ain-ul-Mulk after the death of Jamsheed Quli Qutb Shah. His young son Subhan Quli Qutb Shah became king, but many nobles were unhappy with the growing power of Saif Khan who controlled the army and treasury. At the same time support increased for Ibrahim Quli Qutb Shah Wali who was living in Vijayanagara. Several nobles secretly invited Ibrahim to return and claim the throne. As he marched toward Golconda many people and soldiers joined his side. Fighting and unrest spread across the kingdom and finally Saif Khan lost support and fled. Ibrahim Quli Qutub Shah Wali then entered Golconda and was welcomed by the people as their new ruler.

== Background ==
After the death of Jamsheed Quli Qutb Shah his young son Subhan Quli Qutb Shah was placed on the throne of Golconda. The powerful nobles Mustafa Khan and Salabat Khan carried out the coronation and gave the child royal authority. However, the dowager queen did not fully trust these nobles and feared their growing influence in the court. Because of this, she sent a message to Saif Khan ‘Ainu’l Mulk asking him to come to Golconda and serve as the Peshwa (chief minister) of the state.

Saif Khan soon became unpopular among the nobles and people of Golconda because of his arrogant behaviour. Since he had been personally called back by the dowager queen, he believed that he would control the entire government. At the same time, Ibrahim Quli Qutb Shah Wali was living far away in the court of Vijayanagara. Many nobles felt that Saif Khan was becoming too powerful and this increased support for replacing the young Subhan Quli Qutb Shah with Ibrahim, who was seen as a better and more experienced choice for the throne.

== War ==
=== Jaggadeva's Resistance ===
==== Battle of Sunigram ====
The situation in Golconda became very unstable during the struggle for power. Jaggadeva Rao with the support of the Naigwaris, marched to Bhongir Fort freed Daulat Quli, and took control of the fort. Jagadeva Rao paid his respects to Daulat Quli and asked him to come to Golconda as king, but Daulat at first refused. Only after Jaggadeva warned that the state might collapse before Ibrahim Quli Qutb Shah Wali could return did he agree to govern temporarily in his brother’s name. However, real power and resources were still controlled by Saif Khan. To strengthen his side Jaggadeva Rao sought help from Tufal Khan prime minister of Berar Sultanate who sent 3,000 troops. Even with this support their combined forces were defeated at Sunigram around ninety miles from Bhongir.

==== Siege of Bhongir ====
Saif Khan then decided to attack Bhongir Fort and sent a message demanding that Jagadeva Rao surrender the fort. Jagadeva Rao refused, saying that he was protecting the citadel in the name of Ibrahim Quli Qutb Shah Wali and could not hand it over. Saif Khan then surrounded the fort and cut off supplies forcing the starving garrison to surrender. Daulat Quli was imprisoned once again, while Jagadeva Rao was captured and taken to Golconda as a prisoner. Saif Khan believed that he had crushed all opposition and secured complete control over the state. However, he failed to notice the growing anger against him and the increasing support among the nobles and people for the exiled prince Ibrahim Quli Qutub Shah Wali.

=== Ibrahim March Towards Golconda ===
After opposition against Saif Khan continued to grow, Mustafa Khan secretly wrote to Ibrahim Quli Qutb Shah Wali at Vijayanagara and invited him to return and claim the throne. Ibrahim’s loyal companions, Syed Hye and Hamid Khan, urged him to move quickly before the situation changed again. Ibrahim also consulted Rama Raya who supported him and even offered military help through his brother Venkatadri with a large force of ten thousand cavalry and twenty thousand infantry. Some historians like Muhammad Qasim Firishta claim Ibrahim’s advisers feared that such a large Vijayanagara Army might later interfere in Golconda’s politics, but Vijayanagara sources like Narasabupaliyamu state clearly that Rama Raya helped Ibrahim recover his kingdom. During the journey toward Tilangana, Rama Raya personally accompanied Ibrahim for some distance. On the way Ibrahim Quli Qutub Shah Wali was attacked by a man named Nanappa, believed to be connected to Saif Khan but Ibrahim killed him in a close fight. Near the Telangana frontier Mustafa Khan and Salabat Khan joined Ibrahim with their troops near Panagal. Ibrahim was advised to dismiss the Hindu troops sent by Vijayanagara and he agreed to do so.

=== Unrest in Golconda ===
There was great excitement in Golconda when news arrived that Ibrahim Quli Qutb Shah Wali had crossed the Tungabhadra River and was marching toward the kingdom. Many people and nobles in the capital slowly began supporting Ibrahim, hoping he would restore stability to the state. However, Saif Khan and his supporters insisted that Subhan Quli Qutb Shah was the true heir to the throne and argued that Ibrahim Quli Qutub Shah Wali had no legal right to rule. They also believed that Saif Khan could not easily be defeated because he controlled both the royal treasury and the army. When Saif Khan learned that Ibrahim Quli Qutub Shah Wali’s supporters had gathered at Koilkonda Fort, he prepared to march south with his forces. Before leaving, he asked Khudawand Khan to take charge of the capital. Khudawand Khan warned that removing most of the army from the city could create disorder and unrest, but Saif Khan ignored the advice and marched toward Koilkonda with his troops.

As soon as Saif Khan left the capital with the army unrest quickly spread through Golconda. Jaggadeva Rao, who was being held prisoner inside the Bala Hissar, managed to appear before the public from one of the fort battlements. His appearance excited the people, and many openly declared their support for Ibrahim Quli Qutb Shah Wali and demanded that he be brought to the throne. During this confusion, Khudawand Khan was reportedly drunk and unable to control the situation. By the time he recovered, violence had already broken out across the capital. Fighting spread through the streets and Khudawand Khan was killed in the chaos. Taking advantage of the moment Jagadeva Rao immediately proclaimed Ibrahim Quli Qutub Shah Wali as the new ruler of Golconda Sultanate.

== Aftermath ==
When Saif Khan heard about the uprising in Golconda and the proclamation of Ibrahim Quli Qutb Shah Wali as king, he realized that his cause was lost. Instead of marching back to the capital he chose to leave for Ahmednagar after sending a respectful message accepting Ibrahim’s authority. Ibrahim Quli Qutub Shah Wali stayed only three days at Koilkonda Fort before moving toward the capital. As he approached the city the people of Golconda came out in huge numbers to welcome their new ruler. The streets were decorated with great joy, music and celebrations filled the air and thousands gathered along the main road to see Ibrahim Quli Qutub Shah Wali enter the city as their king.

== See also ==
- Golconda Fort
- Charminar
- Deccan Sultanates
