= Imam Quli =

Imam Quli (Persian: امام‌قلی or امامقلی) may refer to:

- Imam Quli (given name)
- Emam Qoli, Kermanshah
- Emamqoli, Lorestan
- Emamqoli, Razavi Khorasan

== Other ==
- İmamqulukənd
