= Neknampur Lake =

- Location within Hyderabad Location within Telangana Location within India
- Location: Manikonda, Hyderabad
- Coordinates: 17°23′02″N 78°22′13″E
- Type: artificial lake
- Basin countries: India
- First flooded: 1600s
- Max. length: 100 m (330 ft)
- Surface area: Present = 292.23 acres (1.18 km^{2}); Full = 1,452.9 acres (5.88 km^{2})
- Frozen: Never

Neknampur Lake, also known as Ibrahim Bagh Cheruvu, is a lake in Hyderabad, India. It was once part of a water reservoir network that was used for irrigation and providing drinking water in the surrounding areas.

== History ==
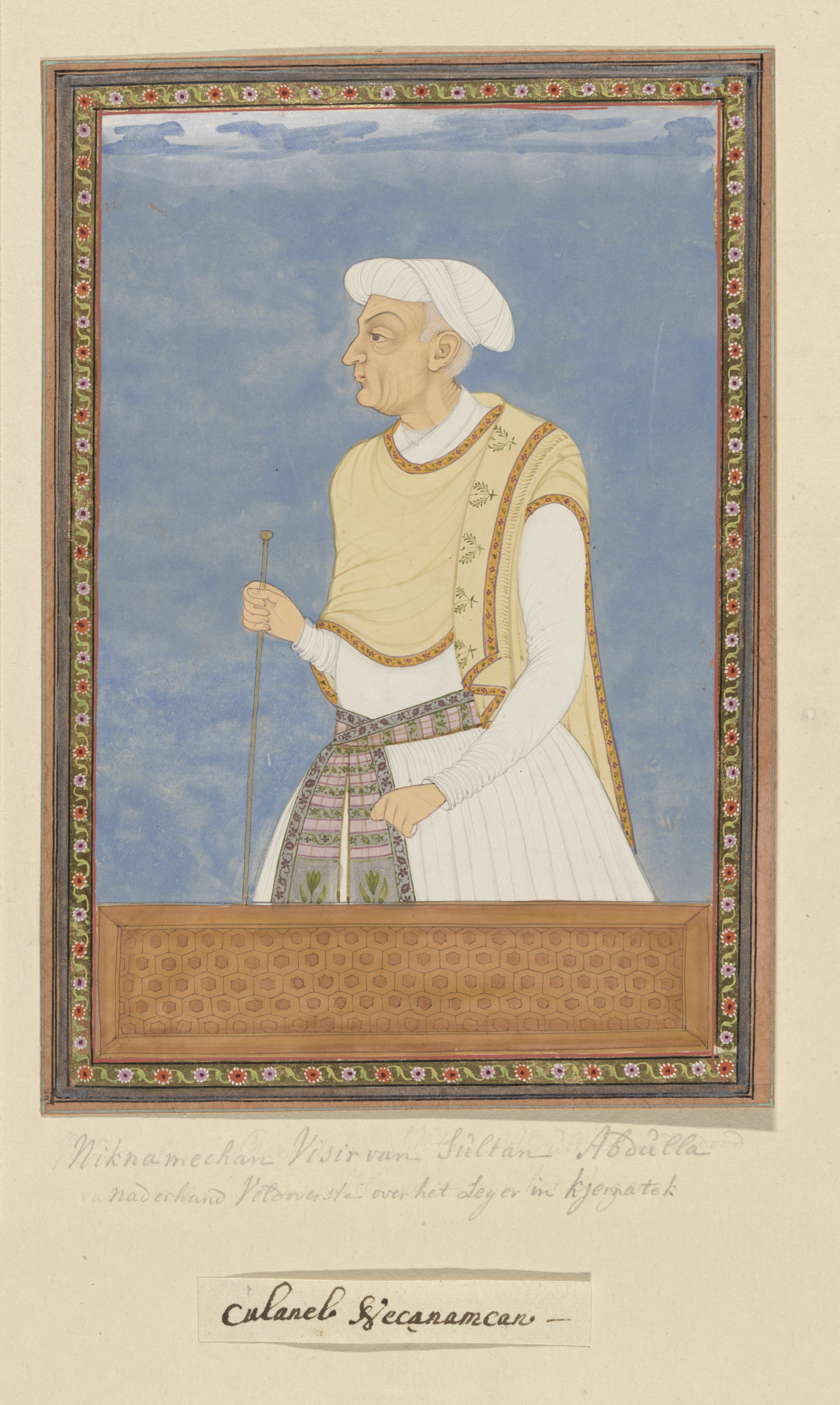
A portrait of Neknam Khan

The lake was first dug up in the late 16th century by Ibrahim Qutb Shah, the fourth ruler of Golconda, and later flooded by his grandson Abdullah Qutb Shah. The construction was entrusted to Neknam Khan, one of Shah's courtiers. Rather than using water from the adjacent Musi, Neknam Khan commissioned channels to fill the lake from water bodies behind the Golconda Fort. Neknampur Lake is one of the three major lakes that were created during the reign of Quli Qutub Shah alongside Ibrahimpatnam Lake and Hussainsagar. There was a proposal by Greater Hyderabad Municipal Corporation to use the lake to dump sewage from surrounding housing colonies. The lake is today divided into two parts known as Chinna Cheruvu, which is smaller, and Pedda Cheruvu, which is larger. The Chinna Cheruvu has been partially restored and converted into a scenic spot whereas the Pedda Cheruvu continues to struggle with pollution. The lake is polluted with various chemicals and also used as a garbage dump by the residential colonies surrounding it. Encroachments and illegal structures surrounding the lake were demolished by government authorities. However these structures are being illegally rebuilt by the encroachers.

== Restoration efforts ==
The lake was gradually occupied by land grabbers and converted into a dump yard for construction debris, garbage, sewage discharge and covered in water hyacinth. At one stage, the surface area of the lake was less than 25 acres (0.10 km^{2}). Efforts to restore the lake were undertaken in 2016 with the help of NGOs based in Hyderabad. The restoration and rejuvenation of the lake included cleaning the lake and floating wetland treatment to tackle the growth of water hyacinth. Contaminants were removed using plants and with the use of microorganisms. NITI Aayog has recognised these efforts and "it has been identified as a role model for 'best restoration practices' in the country." Neknampur Lake restoration "has been recognised as a role model in the 'watershed development' category along with four other projects" in India. According to Niti Aayog, there has been a 90% reduction in Biochemical Oxygen Demand (BOD) of the lake. Centre for Science and Environment (CSE) has also recognised Neknampur Lake "as the best model of lake restoration in India."
