= Addanki Gangadhara Kavi =

Telugu language poet

Addanki Gangadhara Kavi was a Telugu language poet and writer of a 16th century, from Hyderabad, India. He was the court poet of Qutb Shahi Sultan Ibrahim Quli Qutb Shah Wali of Golconda for whom Addanki dedicated his work Tapathi Samvaranopaakhyaana-(1565 A.D) and honored the Sultan with the title Malki BhaRama.

Tapathi Samvaranopaakhyaana-(1565 A.D) are long poems which praises the characters of Ibrahim Quli Qutb Shah Wali as a king, it describes the Ibrahim’s political and social aspects, a commentary of Ibrahim’s campaigns of Rajahmundry, Srikakulam and Orissa, with miniature pictures of Qutb Shahi Sultan's court.
