= Hoseyn Qoli =

Hoseyn Qoli (Persian: حسين قلي) may refer to:

- Hoseyn Qoli, Kerman
- Hoseyn Qoli, Khuzestan

== See also ==
- Husayn Quli, a given name
