= Murtada Quli =

Murtada Quli (Azerbaijani: Murtuzaqulu; Persian: مرتضیقلی) is a Turkic-derived Muslim male given name built from quli.

- Morteza Qoli Khan Qajar
- Morteza-Qoli Bayat
- Morteza-Qoli Khan Hedayat
- Murtuzaqulu Khan Bayat

== See also ==
- Morteza Qoli Kandi
