= Tahmasb Quli =

Tahmasb Quli (Persian: طهماسبقلی) is a Muslim male given name built from the components Tahmasb (Persian) and Quli (Turkic).

- Tahmasp Qoli Khan (died 1626), Governor of Kerman in Safavid Persia
- Tahmasb Quli Khan (the future Nadir Shah)

== See also ==
- Tahmasb Qoli, village in Kurdistan, Iran
