= Kulyov =

Kulyov (Russian: Кулёв) is a Russian masculine surname, its feminine counterpart is Kulyova. Notable people with the surname include:

- Vitali Kulyov (born 1976), Russian footballer

== See also ==
- Kulov
