= Qulizada =

Qulizada (Azerbaijani: Quluzadə; Persian: قلیزاده, romanized: qolizâde) is a surname built from Turkic quli and the Persian suffix -zada. It may refer to:

- Amit Guluzade (born 1992), Azerbaijani football player
- Khagani Guluzade (born 1977), Azerbaijani businessman
- Ramin Guluzade (born 1977), Azerbaijani politician and minister
- Vafa Guluzade (1940–2015), Azerbaijani diplomat, political scientist and specialist in conflict resolution
- Zumrud Guluzadeh, Azerbaijani professor of philosophy
- Mahtab Qolizadeh, Iranian journalist
- Ali Qolizadeh, Iranian footballer
- Arash Qolizadeh, Iranian footballer
- Aref Qolizadeh, Iranian footballer
