= Mahdi Quli =

Mahdi Quli is a male given name meaning 'slave of the Mahdi'. It is built from quli.

== People ==
- Mahdi Quli Khan Hidayat (1863–1955)
- Mahdi Quli Khan Shamlu
- Mehdigulu Khan Javanshir (1763 or 1772–1845)
- Mehdigulu Khan Vafa (1855–1900)
