= Safi Quli =

Safi Quli (Azerbaijani: Səfiqulu; Persian: صفیقلی, romanized: ṣafiqoli) is a Turkic-derived Muslim male given name built from quli.

- Safiqoli Khan
- Safiqoli Khan (son of Rostam Khan)
- Safiqoli Khan Undiladze
- Safi Quli Khan
