= Ali Quli =

Ali Quli (Azerbaijani: Əliqulu; Turkish: Alikulu; Uzbek: Aliquli; Persian: علیقلی, romanized: 'Aliqoli; Urdu: علی قلی, romanized: 'Alī Qulī) is a Turkic-derived Muslim male given name meaning 'slave of Ali'. It is built from quli. It is equivalent to Arabic-derived Abd al-Ali or Persian-derived Gholamali.

== People ==
- Ali Quli Istajlu
- Aliquli Jabbadar
- Aliqoli Mirza Qajar
- Aliqoli Jadid-ol-Eslam
- Aliqoli Khan
- Ali Kuli Khan Khattak
- Ali Quli Khan Zaman
- Nawab Ali Quli Khan Bahadur (17th century), Subadar of Multan, Oudh, Orissa, Gujarat and Delhi
- Ali-Qoli Khan Bakhtiari
- Ali-Qoli Khan Zarabi
