= Qurban Quli =

Qurban Quli (Turkmen: Gurbanguly) is a Turkic-derived Muslim male given name built from quli.

- Gurbanguly Berdimuhamedow (born 1957), Turkmen politician, President of Turkmenistan (2007–2022)
- Gurbanguly Aşyrow (born 1993), Turkmen professional footballer
