= Husayn Quli =

Husayn Quli (Azerbaijani: Hüseynqulu; Uzbek: Husaynquli; Persian: حسینقلی, romanized: Hoseynqoli; Urdu: حسین قلی, romanized: Husayn Qulī) is a Turkic-derived Muslim male given name meaning 'slave of Husayn'. It is built from quli. It is equivalent to Arabic-derived Abd al-Husayn or Persian-derived Gholamhoseyn.

== People ==
- Huseyngulu Sarabski
- Hosayn Qoli Donboli
- Husain Quli Beg

== See also ==
- Hoseyn Qoli (disambiguation)
