= 2007 Turkmenistan presidential election =

- 11 February 2007
- Registered: 2,677,589
- Turnout: 98.92%
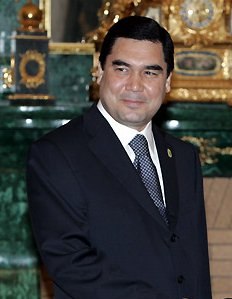

Nominee	Gurbanguly Berdimuhamedow	Amanýaz Atajykow
Party	TDP	TDP
Popular vote	2,357,120	85,016
Percentage	89.07%	3.21%
- Results by region
President before election
Gurbanguly Berdimuhamedow (Acting)
TDP
Elected President
Gurbanguly Berdimuhamedow
TDP

Presidential elections were held in Turkmenistan on 11 February 2007, following the death of president-for-life Saparmurat Niyazov on 21 December 2006.

== Election date ==
After Niyazov's death on 21 December 2006 Acting President Gurbanguly Berdimuhamedow stated that the date for the next presidential election would be announced on 26 December; he also claimed that these elections would be held "on a democratic basis that has been laid by the great leader". On 26 December the People's Council announced that the election would take place on 11 February 2007.

== Candidates ==
Six candidates were approved out of eleven contenders, all of them members of the Democratic Party:

- Amanýaz Atajykow, member of parliament and deputy governor of Daşoguz Province
- Gurbanguly Berdimuhamedow, Acting President
- Orazmyrat Garajaýew, mayor of Abadan
- Muhammetnazar Gurbanow, head of the Garabekewul district
- Işanguly Nuryýew, Deputy Oil and Gas Industry and Natural Resources Minister
- Aşyrnyýaz Pomanow, mayor of Türkmenbaşy

Current authorities endorsed the Acting President. The candidate nominated by the opposition coalition (whose members are mostly in exile) (led by the Republican Party of Turkmenistan and Watan), Hudaýberdi Orazow, was not approved.

Before the elections, ITAR-TASS claimed that instead of Gurbanow, Durdy Durdyýew, the Deputy Tourism and Sports Minister, would be a candidate in the election. Later reports never mentioned him again and always gave the six candidates named above as the approved candidates, so it seems likely that Durdyýew was only one of the eleven proposed candidates.

At the start of his campaign, Berdimuhamedow promised substantial reforms such as allowing internet access for everyone and revamping the education system, but at the same time vowed to follow Niyazov's footsteps. He also said he would support small business and private ownership, noting that 61% of the economy is in private hands.

== Conduct ==
Electoral officials in Turkmenistan reported that 95% of voters voted in the election. Radio Free Europe disputes the voter turn-out figures provided by the government, and said that the election was "neither free nor fair". The International Crisis Group described the poll as a "blatantly falsified election".

Seeking to boost voter participation, officials warned inhabitants of Lebap Province that they would not get their monthly flour rations if they failed to vote. At the same time, first-time and elderly voters were promised "gifts" for voting. Later reports indicated that the gift consisted of the late Niyazov's ubiquitous Ruhnama.

== Results ==
Gurbanguly Berdimuhamedow was declared the winner of the election on 14 February, receiving 89% of the vote according to official results, and was sworn in as president immediately afterwards.

Candidate	Party	Votes	%
Gurbanguly Berdimuhamedow	Democratic Party	2,357,120	89.07
Amanýaz Atajykow	Democratic Party	85,016	3.21
Işanguly Nuryýew	Democratic Party	62,830	2.37
Muhammetnazar Gurbanow	Democratic Party	62,672	2.37
Orazmyrat Garajaýew	Democratic Party	40,821	1.54
Aşyrnyýaz Pomanow	Democratic Party	34,733	1.31
Against all		3,174	0.12
Total		2,646,366	100.00
Valid votes		2,646,366	99.92
Invalid/blank votes		2,231	0.08
Total votes		2,648,597	100.00
Registered voters/turnout		2,677,589	98.92
Source: Government of Turkmenistan
