= Shitab Khan =

Shitab Khan (late 15th century-early 16th century), also spelled Chitapu Khan, was born Sitapathi Raju in the Telangana, India. He joined as a foot soldier in the army of Humayun Shah, the Turko-Persian Bahmani Sultan, and rose up the ranks to acquire senior captaincy, his own jagir (a land fief) and the title 'Shitab Khan'. He always used the title in his inscriptions but never actually converted to Islam.

== The kingdom ==
The entire Telugu speaking areas which now form the state of Andhra Pradesh (an area greater than the size of France) were united and saw an efflorescence of all the arts, culture and military might under the rule of the Kakatiya Emperors. They finally fell in 1323 to the invading forces of the Turko-Persian Sultan of Delhi, Muhammad bin Tughluq, whose Deccan (southern) governor, the Turko-Persian Alauddin Bahman Shah eventually rebelled in 1347 setting up the independent Bahmani Sultanate ruling from Gulbarga. His dominions extended up to Golconda in the east. Meanwhile, further south, the mighty Vijayanagara Empire had arisen from the Kampili-Hampi region, taking over much of what is now the Rayalaseema region of Andhra. In the far east, the rulers of Orissa occupied Telugu lands up to the banks of the Godavari and by the mid-15th century the powerful Gajapatis had replaced the Ganga dynasty. Fall of Kakatiya dynasty led way to the emergence of new kingdom Musunuri dynasty by Musunuri Prola Bhupathi, also called as Prolaya Nayaka. Prolaya's brother Kapaya captured Warangal and made it his capital. The three Telugu kingdoms of Warangal of Musunuri Nayaks, Rachakonda of Recherla Nayaks and Kondaveedu of Reddy dynasty, therefore, were boxed in by the three major powers and led a precarious existence for about a century with frequent internecine quarrels, alliances and counter-alliances with one or the other of the major powers. All three ceased to exist by the mid-15th century, Warangal absorbed into Bahamani and later by Gajapathi, Rachakonda and Devarakonda absorbed into the Bahmani and Kondaveedu into the Gajapati and Vijayanagara kingdoms. Musunuri kings of Warangal patronised many poets. By Shitab Khan's time the Bahmanis had recently acquired this important buffer state on their eastern frontiers.

From 1480 to 1485, Shitab Khan was the governor of Rachakonda (near Narayanpur in modern Nalgonda district, Andhra Pradesh). He seems to have taken advantage of the internal turmoils of the Bahmanis and declared his independence in 1503, ruling from the Rachakonda, Warangal and Khammam forts from 1503 to 1512. He appears to have been very popular and inscriptional evidence suggests that he undertook many public works including repairing irrigation tanks and reinstating ruined temples. His stated purpose was to re-instate the great glory of the bygone Kakatiya times. A 16x38x12 m building in fine Indo-Saracenic style still stands in the old Warangal Fort, called Kush Mahal or Shitab Khan Palace. He had the Pakhala tank repaired which still serves many farmlands in the area and is now a picturesque tourist spot. He was also a patron of literature and Telugu poetry continued to flourish in his time. His prime minister, Enumulapalli Peddanna mantri, was the patron of Charigonda Dharmanna who wrote the Chitra Bharatam, a classic of Telugu poetry. Rich descriptions of his rule are in this work.

In the turbulent regional politics of the time, Quli Qutb Shah, the Turko-Persian ruler of Golconda Fort (in modern Hyderabad) was asserting his dominance and Shitab Khan had to face invasions from Golconda which was just shaking off the suzerainty of the Bahmanis. Warangal succumbed to the Turko-Persian Golconda ruler and Shitab Khan had to flee, about 1512. He joined the service of Gajapati Prataparudra Deva. When the great Vijayanagara Emperor Sri Krishnadevaraya went on his Kalinga campaign, 1516–1517, his triumphal progress was effectively hindered by the archers of Shitab Khan at the mountain pass near Simhachalam (modern Visakhapatnam district). But Shitab lost the battle and, very likely, his life there.
