= Durdy Durdyýew =

Turkmenistani politician

Durdy Durdyýew (often referred to in the Western media by his Russianized name: Дурды Дурдыев Durdy Durdyiev) is the Deputy Tourism and Sports Minister of Turkmenistan. On December 26, 2006, it was falsely announced he was nominated by the People's Council of Turkmenistan to be a candidate in the presidential election scheduled for February 11, 2007. Muhammetnazar Gurbanow, head of the Garabekewul district, was nominated instead.
