= Rida Quli =

Rida Quli (Azerbaijani: Rzaqulu; Uzbek: Rizoquli; Persian: رضاقلی, romanized: Rezâqoli; Urdu: رضا قلی, romanized: Rizā Qulī) is a Turkic-derived Muslim male given name meaning 'slave of Ali ar-Rida'. It is built from quli. It is equivalent to Arabic-derived Abd ar-Rida or Persian-derived Gholamreza.

== People ==
- Reza-Qoli Khan Hedayat
- Reza Qoli Mirza Afshar
- Mirza Rida Quli Shari'at-Sanglaji

== See also ==
- Rzaguliyev
