= Jafar Quli =

Jafar Quli (Azerbaijani: Cəfərqulu; Persian: جعفرقلی, romanized: Ja'farqoli) is a male given name built from quli.

== People ==
- Jafarqoli Khan
- Jafar Qoli Khan Donboli
- Jafargulu agha Javanshir
- Jafargulu Khan Nakhchivanski
- Jafargulu Bakikhanov

== See also ==
- Jafarguliyev
