= Abbas Quli =

Abbas Quli (Azerbaijani: Abbasqulu; Persian: عبّاسقلی, romanized: 'abbâsqoli) is a Turkic-derived Muslim male given name built from quli.

== People ==
- Abbasqoli Mo'tamad-dawla Javanshir
- Abbas Qoli Khan Qajar
- Abbasgulu Bakikhanov
- Abbasgulu bey Shadlinski
