= Imanguliyev =

Imanguliyev (Azerbaijani: İmanquliyev), feminine Imanguliyeva (Azerbaijani: İmanquliyeva), is an Azerbaijani surname. Notable people with the surname include:

- Aida Imanguliyeva (1939–1992), Azerbaijani scholar
- Nasir Imanguliyev (1911–1998), Azerbaijani scientist

== See also ==
- Imangulu
