= Shah Quli =

Shah Quli (Azerbaijani: Şahqulu; Turkish: Şahkulu; Turkmen: Şaguly; Uzbek: Shohquli; Persian: شاهقلی, romanized: Šâhqoli; Urdu: شاہ قلی, romanized: Šāh Qulī) is a Turkic-derived male given name meaning 'slave of the Shah'. It is built from quli.

== People ==
- Shahqoli Khan Zanganeh
- Shah Quli Khan (governor)
- Şahkulu
- Şahkulu (painter)
