= Jafarguliyev =

Jafarguliyev (Azerbaijani: Cəfərquliyev) is an Azerbaijani surname. Notable people with the surname include:

- Emin Jafarguliyev (born 1990), Azerbaijani footballer
- Elvin Jafarguliyev (born 2000), Azerbaijani footballer

== See also ==
- Jafargulu
