= Emam Qoli, Kermanshah =

Emam Qoli امامقلی
- Village
- Location within Iran
- Coordinates: 34°17′36″N 45°54′22″E
- Country: Iran
- Province: Kermanshah
- County: Gilan-e Gharb
- Bakhsh: Central
- Rural District: Direh

Population (2006)
  - Total: 84
- Time zone: UTC+3:30 (IRST)
  - Summer (DST): UTC+4:30 (IRDT)

Emam Qoli (Persian: امامقلی, also Romanized as Emām Qolī and Emāmqolī; also known as Emāmqolī Dīreh) is a village in Direh Rural District, in the Central District of Gilan-e Gharb County, Kermanshah Province, Iran. At the 2006 census, its population was 84, in 16 families.
