= Mahtab Gholizadeh =

Iranian journalist

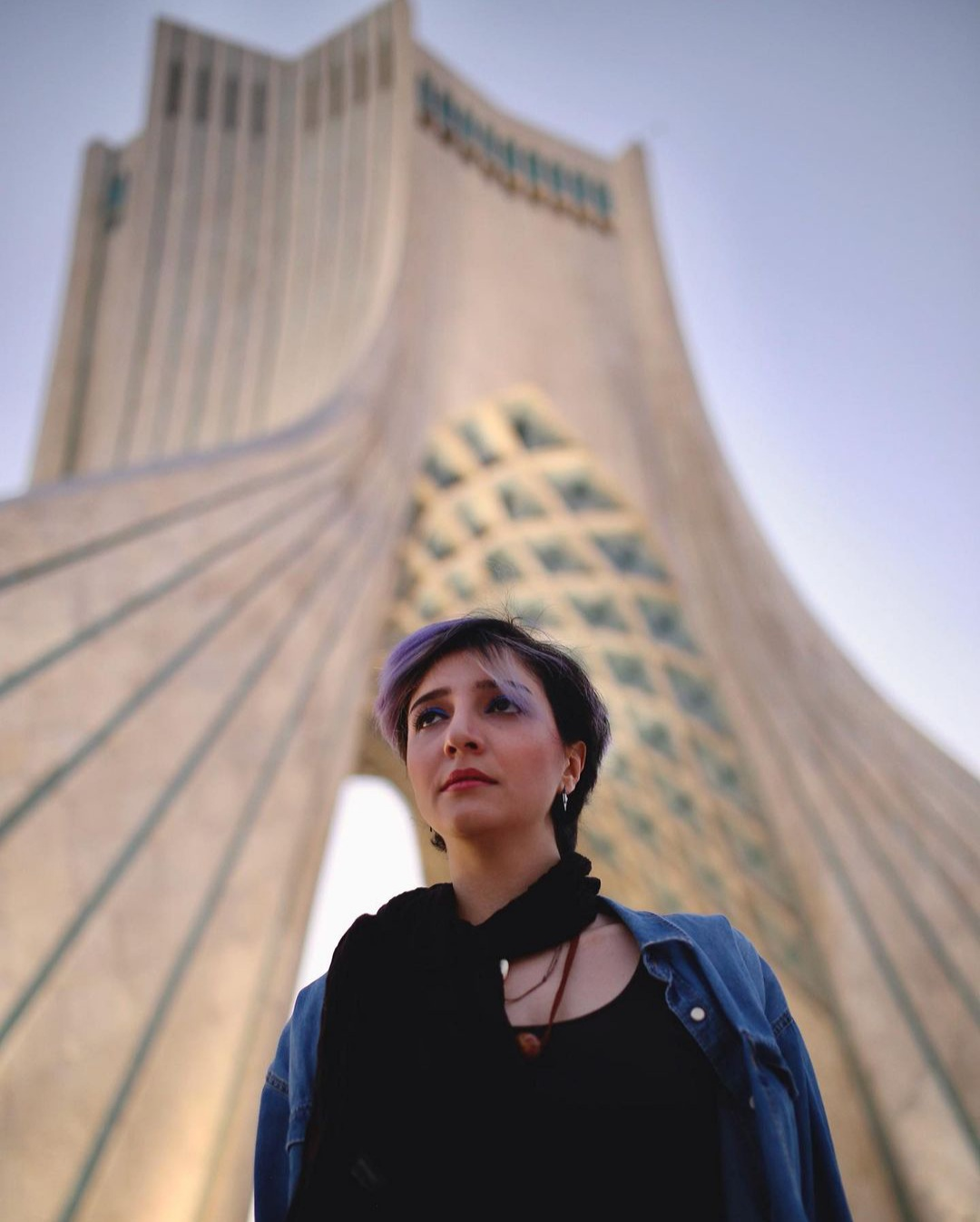
- Mahtab Gholizadeh in 2020 near the Azadi Tower
- Born: April 6, 1988 (age 38); Garmsar, Iran
- Occupation: Journalist
- Years active: 2007–present

Mahtab Gholizadeh (Persian: مهتاب قلی‌زاده, romanized: Mahtâb Qolizâde; born 6 April 1988 in Garmsar) is an Iranian journalist, who works especially in macroeconomics, political economy, and Women's rights. She has worked as a journalist in several Iranian newspapers like Hayat-e-No, Shargh, and Etemad. Now, she is working as an independent journalist. She was arrested on charges brought by Iran's regime in December 2021 and released temporarily with a Rls.10 billion bail. Iran's regime has also restrained her from leaving the country.

== Arrest ==
On 7 August 2021, the Islamic Revolutionary Guard Corps' agents intruded forcibly into Mahtab Gholizadeh's house. They investigated the apartment and captured her passport, cellphone, laptop, recorder, phonebook, external hard, and notes. Simultaneously, she was summoned to Evin's judicial court. Afterwards, she was interrogated several times in the Islamic Revolutionary Guard Corps' office. Eventually, with the accusations of "propaganda against the state," "endangering national security" for having interviews with the foreign media, and "spread of corruption and prostitution" for her effort for achieving the permission of entrance of Iranian women in sports stadiums, she was arrested. She was temporarily released with Rls.10 billion bail.
