= Hoseyn Qoli, Khuzestan =

Hoseyn Qoli حسينقلي
- Village
- Location within Iran
- Coordinates: 32°03′41″N 49°24′45″E
- Country: Iran
- Province: Khuzestan
- County: Andika
- Bakhsh: Abezhdan
- Rural District: Abezhdan

Population (2006)
  - Total: 98
- Time zone: UTC+3:30 (IRST)
  - Summer (DST): UTC+4:30 (IRDT)

Hoseyn Qoli (Persian: حسينقلي, also Romanized as Ḩoseyn Qolī; also known as Deh Belū) is a village in Abezhdan Rural District, Abezhdan District, Andika County, Khuzestan Province, Iran. At the 2006 census, its population was 98, in 22 families.
