= Imam Quli (given name) =

Imam Quli (Azerbaijani: İmamqulu; Uzbek: Imomquli; Persian: امام‌قلی or امامقلی, romanized: Emâmqoli/ Emâm-Qoli/ Emâm-qoli) is a Turkic-derived Muslim male given name meaning 'slave of the Imam'. It is built from quli.

== People ==
- Imam Quli Khan of Bukhara
- Imam Quli Khan (Safavid governor)
- Imam Quli Khan of Kakheti

== Derived surnames ==
- Azerbaijani: İmamquliyev
- Persian: امامقلیزاده, romanized: Emâmqolizâde
