= Işanguly Nuryýew =

Işanguly Nuryýew (born 1953 in Balkanabat, Turkmenistan) is a Turkmen statesman. He was Deputy Minister of Oil and Gas Industry and Mineral Resources of Turkmenistan (2005–2007).

== Biography ==
Işanguly Nuryýew was born in 1953 in Balkanabat, Turkmenistan.

Since 1973, he worked at the enterprise "Turkmencolomtaslama".

In 1973—1974, he worked at the woodworking enterprise of Ashgabat, then the driver of the Central Department of Forecasting of Turkmenistan.

In 1974—1979, he studied at the Turkmen Polytechnic Institute by specialty "Mining engineer" (drilling of oil and gas wells).

In 1989 he worked as a drill master, engineer of the Etrapian engineering and technical service of the petroleum expedition of the industrial association "Turkmengeology".

In 1989—1993, he was head of the central engineering and technical service of the Eastern expedition of the deep drilling of the association "Turkmengeology".

In 1993—2005, the chief engineer of the Karakum administration of mechanized works, an engineer of a hydrogeological trust, head of the paramilitary service to combat oil and gas fountains.

From 2005 — State Minister — Chairman of the State corporation "Turkmengeology".

From December 2005 to March 2007 — Deputy Minister of Oil and Gas Industry and Mineral Resources of Turkmenistan.

== Participation in the presidential election ==
On December 26, 2006, he was nominated by the People's Council of Turkmenistan to be a candidate in the presidential election scheduled for February 11, 2007. Nuryýew finished third with 2.38% of the votes.

Was arrested a month after the elections and convicted for a long time.

== Awards ==
- Award «Altyn Asyr»
- Award «Gayrat»
- Award «Watana bolan söygüsi üçin»
