= Quli Qutb Shah Urban Development Authority =

Urban planning agency for Old city of Hyderabad, Telangana, India

Quli Qutb Shah Urban Development Authority (QQSUDA) కులీ కుతుబ్ షా నగర అభివృద్ధి సంస్థ (Telugu) قلی قطب شاہ اربن ڈیولپمنٹ اتھارٹی (Urdu) Kulī kutub ṣā Nagārā Abhivr̥d'dhi athāriṭī Sanstha

Government agency overview
- Formed: 1981; 45 years ago
- Type: Urban Development Authority
- Jurisdiction: Hyderabad, Telangana, India
- Status: Active, Revives in September 2021; 4 years ago
- Headquarters: Noorkhan Bazaar, Darulshifa, Hyderabad, Telangana 500024, India; 17.37251873481754°N 78.48322614603583°E
- Minister responsible: Anumula Revanth Reddy, Municipal Administration & Urban Development
- Government agency executive: Sri Jayesh Ranjan, IAS, Spl. Chief Secretary MA & UD and Spl. Officer HMDA Limits

The Quli Qutb Shah Urban Development Authority (QQSUDA) is a governmental body established in 1981 to oversee developmental projects in the Old City of Hyderabad, Telangana, India. Initially created with the objective of revitalizing the Old City area by improving civic amenities and infrastructure, QQSUDA faced years of neglect and dormancy due to funding issues. However, in August 2021, the Telangana Government reactivated the authority, entrusting it with several projects aimed at restoring the heritage and promoting tourism in the Old City.

== History ==
QQSUDA was established to strategically plan and facilitate the growth of Hyderabad's Old City. Its primary focus was to enhance the provision of essential civic amenities, including communication, infrastructure, electricity, water supply, drainage systems, housing, educational institutions, recreational facilities, and marketplaces. The Chief Minister of the state is the chairman of this authority.

QQSUDA experienced a period of dormancy over the years, primarily attributed to insufficient financial resources. Successive administrations failed to allocate adequate funds to the authority, and the earmarked public representatives' area development funds were diverted to the south zone of the Greater Hyderabad Municipal Corporation (GHMC) instead of being directed toward QQSUDA. This financial neglect significantly impeded the progress of developmental and restoration projects in the Old City.

=== Reactivation and government initiatives ===
In a significant move to revive QQSUDA, the Telangana Government issued Memo No. 353/2021/MA6UD on August 10, 2021. This memo outlined the specific tasks entrusted to QQSUDA, which included various high-profile projects.

Notable initiatives included:

- Charminar Pedestrian Project (CPP)
- Lad Bazar Pedestrian Project
- Pathergatti Pedestrian Project
- Restoration and Development of Sardar Mahal
- Redevelopment of Murgi Chowk
- Revamping Miralam Mandi
- Development, Protection, and Rejuvenation of the Mir Alam Tank

==== Conservation and restoration of other heritage structures in the Old City ====
Telangana Government ordered the GHMC to strengthen QQSUDA by providing the necessary staff and resources. The GHMC Commissioner was instructed to assign superintendent engineers, executive engineers, deputy executive engineers, and other support staff exclusively to QQSUDA to facilitate these efforts.

The government also authorized the GHMC Commissioner to use the regular budget for QQSUDA projects, ensuring the necessary financial support for these initiatives. Additionally, officials and staff from the GHMC were deputed to QQSUDA.

== See also ==
- Greater Hyderabad Municipal Corporation (GHMC)
- Charminar
- Hyderabad, Telangana
- Quli Qutb Shah Tombs
