= Golconda Sultanate =

Kingdom in Deccan India (1518–1687)

Golconda Sultanate قطب شاهیان
- 1518–1687
- Flag of the Qutb Shahis

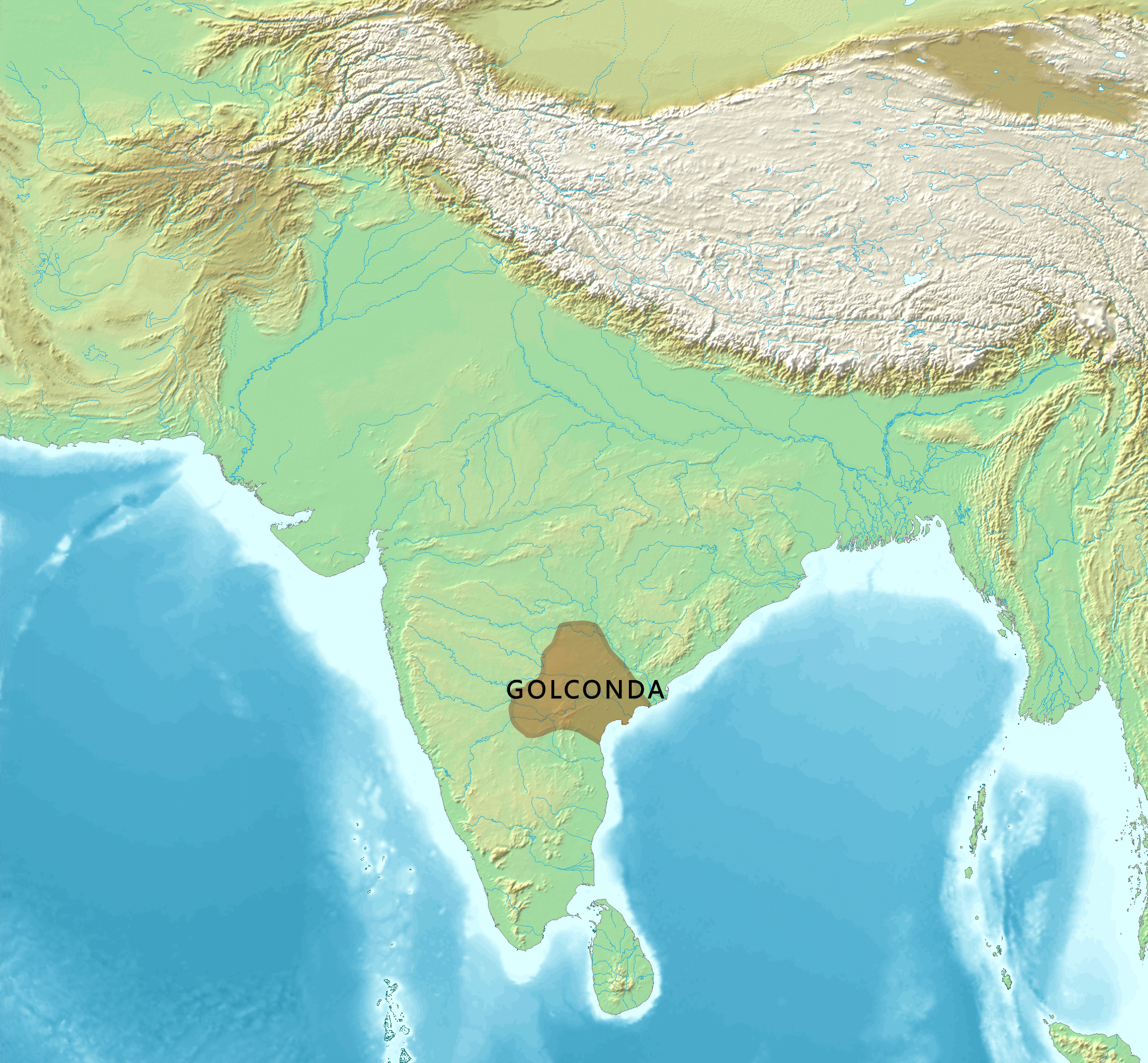
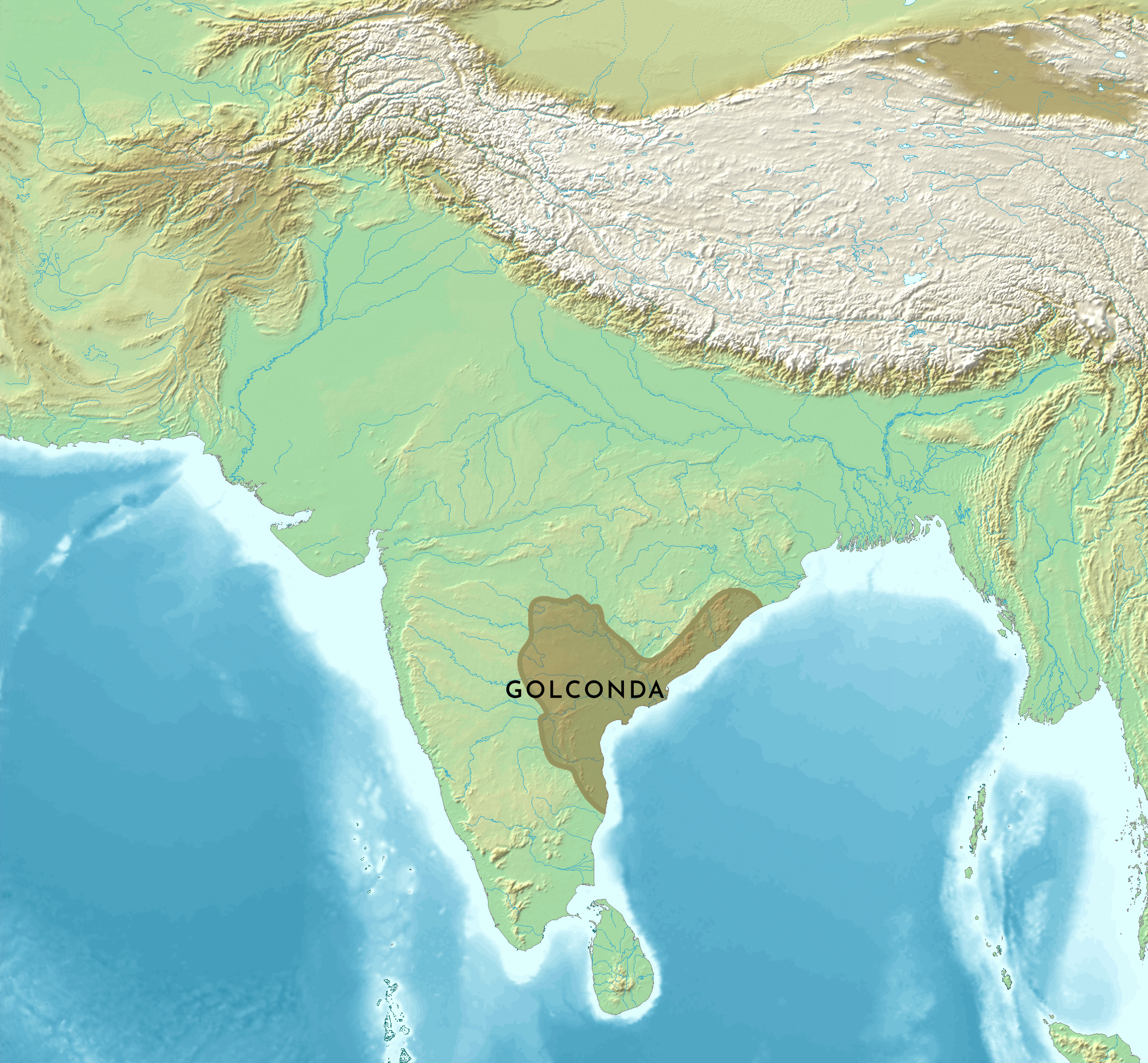
- Capital: Golconda (1518–1591); Hyderabad (1591–1687)
- Common languages: Persian (official); Telugu (official after 1600); Deccani Urdu
- Religion: State religion: Shia Islam Other: Other religions in South Asia
- Government: Monarchy
- Sultan
  - 1518–1543: Sultan Quli Qutb-ul-Mulk
  - 1543–1550: Jamsheed Quli Qutb Shah
  - 1550–1550: Subhan Quli Qutb Shah
  - 1550–1580: Ibrahim Quli Qutb Shah
  - 1580–1612: Muhammad Quli Qutb Shah
  - 1612–1626: Sultan Muhammad Qutb Shah
  - 1626–1672: Abdullah Qutb Shah
  - 1672–1687: Abul Hasan Qutb Shah
- History
  - Established: 7 December 1518
  - Disestablished: 22 September 1687
- Currency: Mohur, Tanka
Preceded by
Bahmani Kingdom
Gajapati Empire
Vijayanagara Empire
Succeeded by
Hyderabad Subah
- Today part of: India

The Golconda Sultanate was an early modern sultanate located in the southeastern Deccan, ruled by the Qutb Shahi dynasty. (Note: (Persian: قطب شاهیان; Urdu: قطب شاہی خاندان)) One of the five Deccan sultanates, it was established in 1518 by Quli Qutb Shah, a Shi'a Muslim of Turkoman origin. The sultanate covered parts of the modern-day Indian states of Andhra Pradesh and Telangana and some parts of Odisha, Karnataka and Tamil Nadu.

The Golconda Sultanate was constantly in conflict with Bijapur and Ahmadnagar, which it shared borders with in the 17th century to the west and northwest. In 1636, Mughal emperor Shah Jahan forced the Qutb Shahis to recognise Mughal suzerainty and pay periodic tributes. The dynasty came to an end in 1687, during the reign of its seventh sultan Abul Hasan Qutb Shah, when the Mughal emperor Aurangzeb arrested and jailed Abul Hasan for the rest of his life in Daulatabad, incorporating Golconda into the Mughal empire.

The Qutb Shahis were patrons of Persianate Shi'a culture. The official and court language of the Golconda Sultanate during the first 90 years of its existence (c. 1518 – 1600) was also Persian. In the early 17th century, however, the Telugu language was elevated to the status of the official language, while towards the end of the Qutb Shahis' rule, it was the primary court language with Persian used occasionally in official documents. According to the Indologist Richard M. Eaton, as Qutb Shahis adopted Telugu, they started viewing their polity as the Telugu-speaking state, with the rulers of the sultanate considering themselves as "Telugu sultans" and patronising Telugu literature.

== History ==
The dynasty's founder, Quli Qutb Shah was born in Hamadan, Iran. He belonged to the Qara Qoyunlu, a Turkoman Muslim tribe and was thus a descendant of Qara Yusuf. In the 16th century, he migrated to Delhi with his uncle, Allah-Quli, some of his relatives and friends. Later he migrated south, to the Deccan and served the Bahmani sultan, Mahmood Shah Bahmani II, who was of Deccani Muslim ethnicity. He declared the independence of Golconda after the disintegration of the Bahmani Sultanate into the five Deccan sultanates. He took the title Qutb Shah, and established the Qutb Shahi dynasty of Golconda. He was assassinated in 1543 by his son, Jamsheed, who assumed control of the sultanate. Jamsheed died in 1550 from cancer. Jamsheed's death triggered the Golconda Civil War. Jamsheed's young son Subhan Quli Qutb Shah reigned for a year, at which time the nobility brought back and installed Ibrahim Quli Qutb Shah as sultan.

Golconda, and with the construction of the Char Minar, later Hyderabad, served as capitals of the sultanate, and both cities were embellished by the Qutb Shahi sultans. The dynasty ruled Golconda for 171 years, until Aurangzeb, in his campaigns in the Deccan, conquered the Sultanate of Golconda in 1687 with the completion of his siege of Golconda. The sultante's last ruler, Abul Hasan Qutb Shah, was imprisoned in Daulatabad Fort, and the territory of the Golconda Sultanate was made into a Mughal imperial province, Hyderabad Subah.

== Economy ==
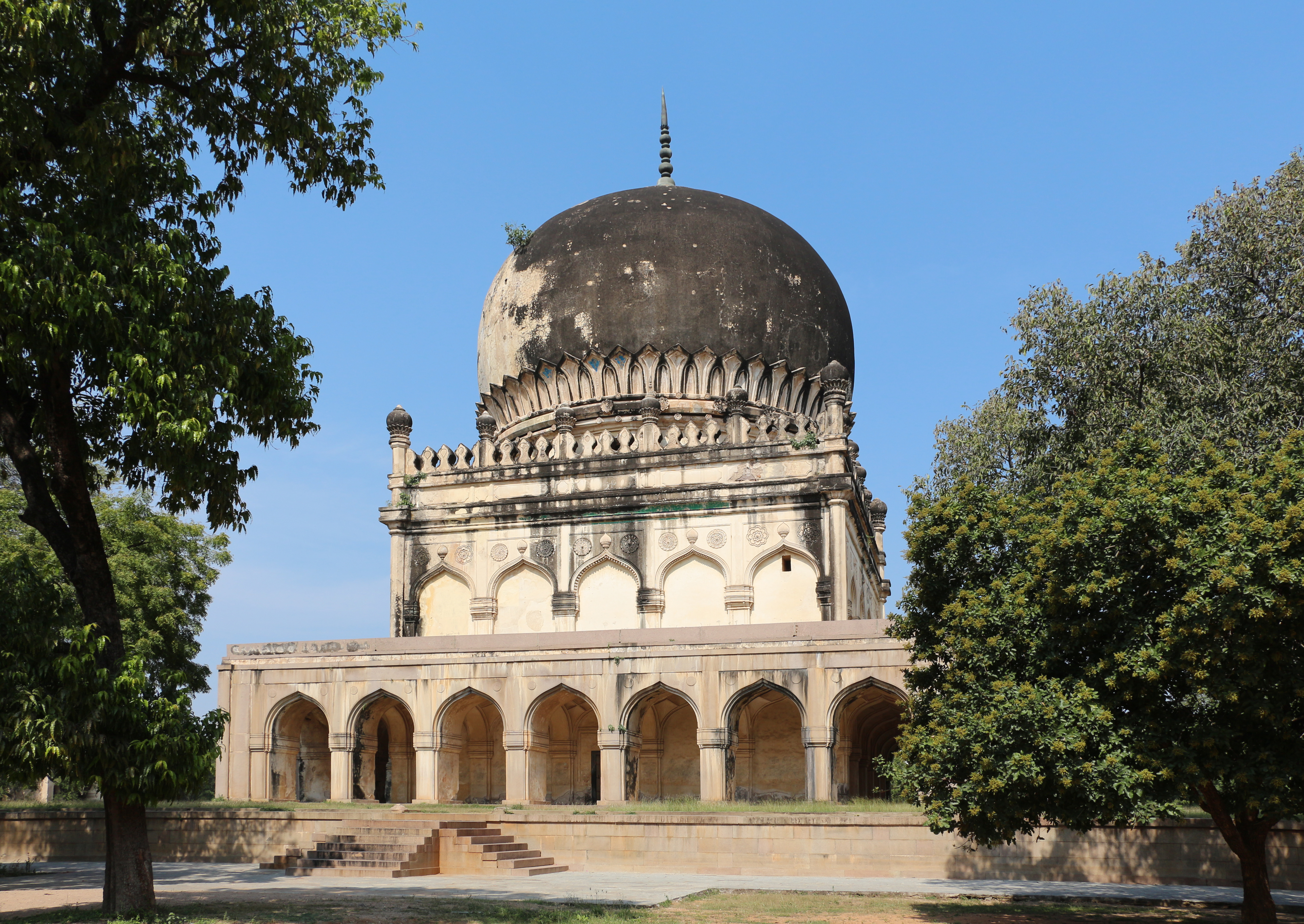
Tomb of Sultan Muhammad Qutb Shah in Hyderabad.

The Golconda Sultanate was notoriously wealthy. While its primary source of revenue was a land tax, the sultanate greatly profited from its monopoly on diamond production from mines in the southern districts of the kingdom. The sultanate also had control over the Krishna and Godavari deltas, giving it access to craft production in the villages of the area, where goods like textiles were produced. The town of Masulipatnam served as the Golconda Sultanate's primary seaport for the export of diamonds and textiles. The kingdom reached the peak of its financial prosperity in the 1620s and 1630s.

=== Diamonds ===
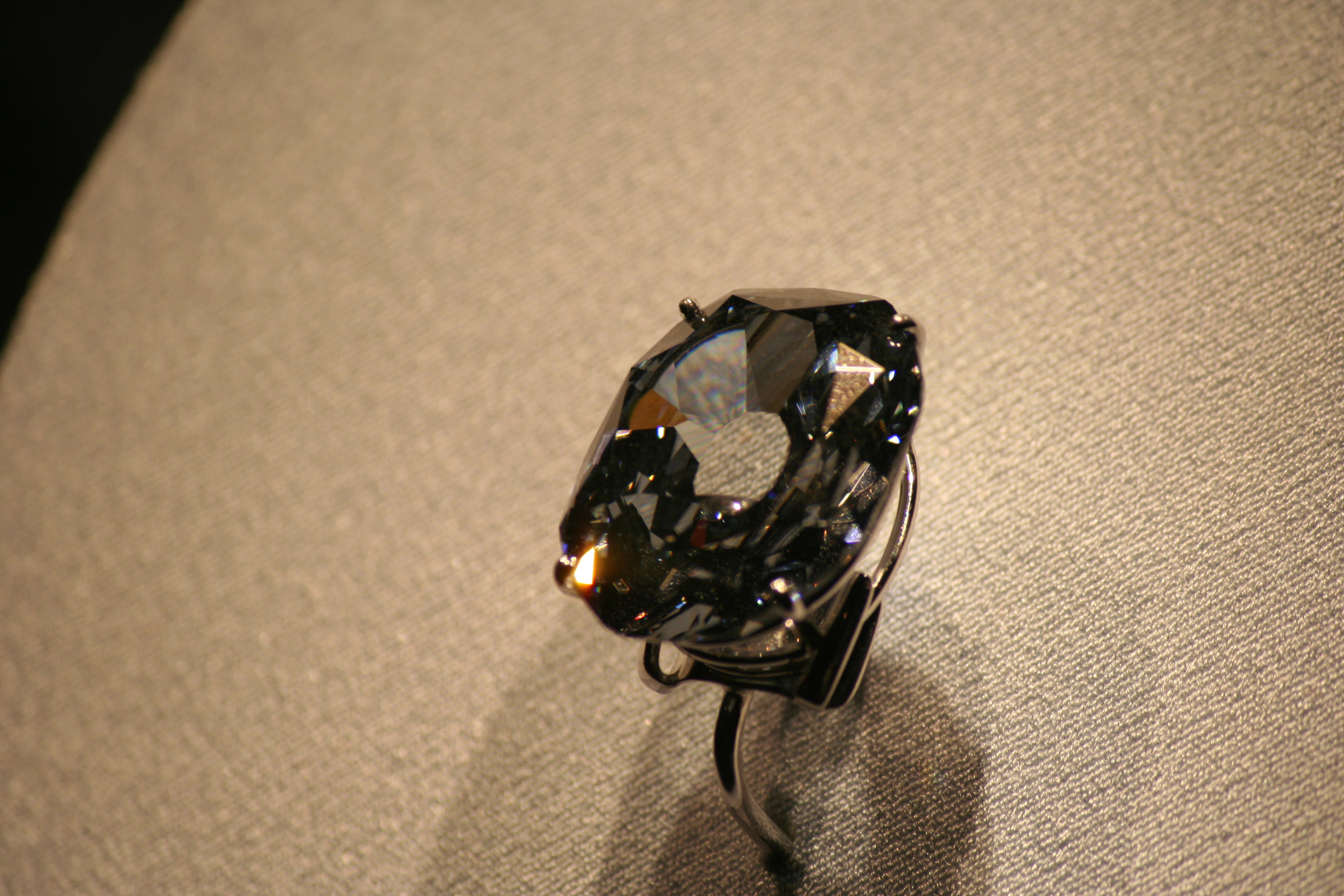
Wittelsbach-Graff Diamond first discovered by the Golconda sultanate

The Golconda Sultanate was known for its diamonds which were dubbed the Golconda diamonds. These diamonds were sought after diamonds long before the Qutb Shahi dynasty came to power, and they continued to supply this demand through European traders. Diamonds from mines (especially the Kollur Mine presently in Guntur district, Andhra Pradesh) were transported to the city of Hyderabad to be cut, polished, evaluated and sold. Golconda established itself as a diamond trading centre and until the end of the 19th century, the Golconda market was the primary source of the finest and largest diamonds in the world.

=== Cotton-weaving ===
During the early seventeenth century, a strong cotton-weaving industry existed in the Deccan region. Large quantities of cotton cloth were produced for domestic and export consumption. High-quality plain and patterned cloth made of muslin and calico was produced. Plain cloth was available in white or brown colour, in bleached or dyed variety. This cloth was exported to Persia and European countries. The patterned cloth was made of prints which were made indigenously with indigo for blue, chay-root for red coloured prints and vegetable yellow. Patterned cloth exports were mainly to Java, Sumatra and other eastern countries. Golconda had a strong trading relationship with Ayutthaya Siam.

== Culture ==
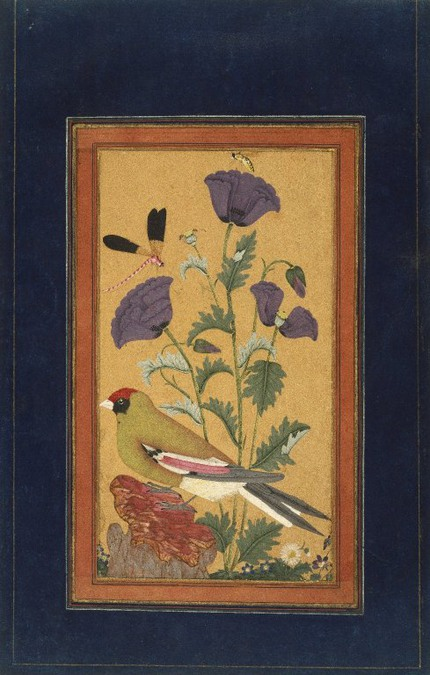
Golkonda Painting, 1650-1670 Opaque watercolor and gold on paper Overall

The Qutb Shahis were patrons of Persianate Shia culture. Over the first 90 years of their rule (c. 1518 – 1600), they championed Persian culture. Their official edicts and court language were in Persian only. Quli Qutb Mulk's court became a haven for Persian culture and literature. In early 17th-century, with Sultan Muhammad Quli Qutb Shah (1580–1612) a change began. He began to patronize the Telugu language and culture as well. Edicts began to be issued both in Persian and Telugu. Towards the end of the dynasty, these were primarily in Telugu with a summary in Persian. As they adopted Telugu, they saw their territory as the Telugu-speaking region, states Indologist Richard Eaton, with their elites considering the rulers as "Telugu Sultans".

Sultan Muhammad Quli Qutb Shah (1580–1612) wrote poems in Dakhini Urdu, Persian and Telugu. Subsequent poets and writers, however, wrote in Urdu, while using vocabulary from Persian, Hindi and Telugu languages. During the reign of Abdullah Qutb Shah in 1634 AD, an ancient Sanskrit text on love and sex Ratirahasya by Kokkoka was translated into Persian and named Lazzat-un-Nisa (Flavors of the Woman).

=== Architecture ===
The Qutb Shahi architecture was Indo-Islamic, a culmination of Indian and Persian architectural styles. Their style was very similar to that of the other Deccan Sultanates. The Qutb Shahi rulers built the Char Minar.

Some examples of Qutb Shahi Indo-Islamic architecture are the Golconda Fort, tombs of the Qutb Shahis, Char Minar and the Char Kaman, Makkah Masjid, Khairatabad Mosque, Hayat Bakshi Mosque, Taramati Baradari and the Toli Mosque.

=== Tombs ===
The tombs of the Qutb Shahi sultans lie about one kilometre north of Golkonda's outer wall. These structures are made of beautifully carved stonework, and surrounded by landscaped gardens. They are open to the public and receive many visitors.

== Administration ==
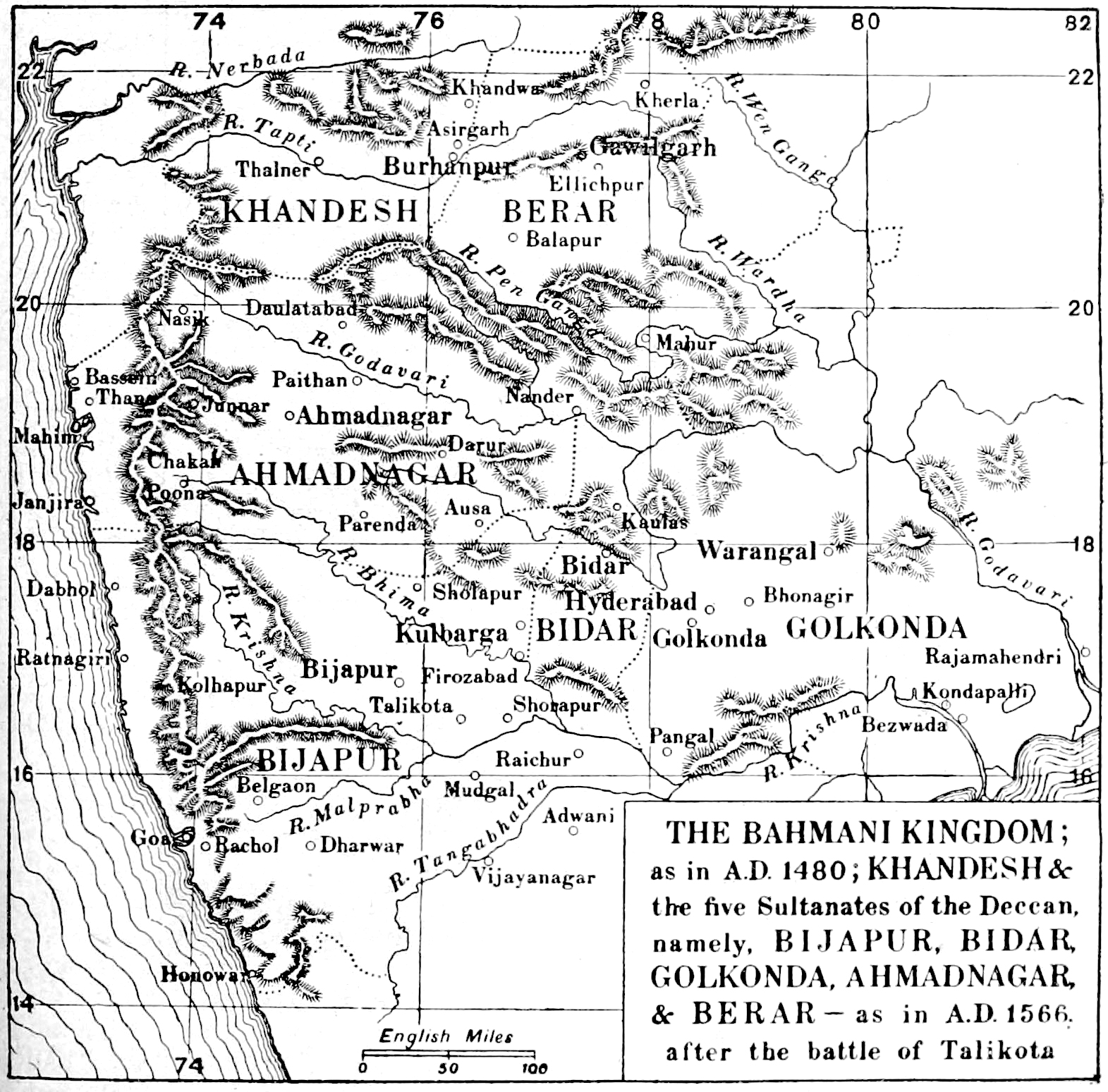
The Bahmani Kingdom, Kandesh, and the Five Sultanates

The Qutb Shahi Kingdom was a highly centralized state. The sultan enjoyed absolute executive judicial and military powers. When he was away, a regent carried to carry on the administration on behalf of the king. The Peshwa (Prime Minister) was the highest official of the sultanate. He was assisted by a number of ministers, including Mir Jumla (finance minister), Kotwal (police commissioner), and Khazanadar (treasurer).

For most of their reign, the Qutb Shahi sultanate had a system of jagirs, who would provide troops as well as collect taxes. They were allowed to keep a portion of the taxes and give the sultan the rest. Tax collection was through auction farms, and the highest bidder used to get the Governorship. While the Governors enjoyed a luxurious lifestyle, they had to bear the brunt of severe punishments for default, consequently, they were harsh on the people. Tana Shah – the last Sultan, with advice from his Brahmin ministers responsible for tax collection, introduced a reform whereby all taxes were collected by civil professionals for a region. The soldiers, government workers, court officials and all the Muslim elites were paid allowances from the Sultan's treasury. These reforms brought a large increase in revenues.

According to Moreland, in the earlier system, the Persian-origin Muslims were paid the highest, then the other Indian Muslims. In early 17th century, the Persian origin Muslims became rich by lending money on high interest (usury) of 4-5% per mensem much to the despair of Hindus.

The Sultanate had 66 forts, and each fort was administered by a Nayak. In the second half of the 17th century, the Qutb Shahi Sultan hired many Hindu Nayaks. According to Kruijtzer, these were mainly Brahmins. According to another account, these were mainly from the Kamma, Velama, Kapu, and Raju warrior castes. They served as civil revenue officers. After the Mughals dismissed the Qutb Shahi dynasty in 1687, these Hindu Nayaks were also dismissed and replaced with Muslim military commanders.

=== Administrative divisions ===
The Golconda Sultanate and main South Asian polities circa 1525 AD, on the eve of the establishment of the Mughal Empire.

The sultanate in 1670 comprised 21 sarkars (provinces) which in turn were divided into 355 parganas (districts).

S.No.	Name of Sarkar	Number of Paraganas
1	Muhammadnagar (Golconda)	22
2	Medak	16
3	Melangūr (Molangur)	3
4	Elangandel	21
5	Warangal	16
6	Khammamēṭ (Khammam)	11
7	Dēvarkoṇḍa (Devarakonda)	13
8	Pangal	5
9	Mustafanagar (Kondapalli)	24
10	Bhoṇgīr (Bhongir)	11
11	Akarkara	6
12	Kovilkoṇdā (Koilkonda)	13
13	Ghanpura	8
14	Murtaza Nagar (Kondaveedu) with three tarafs	39
15	Machilipatnam	8
16	Ellore	12
17	Rajahmundry	24
18	Chicacole (Srikakulam) with 3 tarafs	115
19	Kaulas	5
20	Nizampatnam Mahal	1
21	Karnatak including Arcot taraf (It had 16 sarkars)	162

== Religion ==
The Qutb Shahi dynasty, like many Deccan Islamic dynasties, was a Shia Muslim dynasty with roots in Persia (modern Iran). Initially, they were very strict and they persecuted the Hindus who constituted the vast majority of the population. Open practice of Hindu festivals was forbidden in the Golconda Sultanate. It was Muhammad Quli Qutb Shah who first reversed this policy, and allowed Hindus to practice their festivals and religion in the open.

In the final decades of their rule, the Qutb Shahi dynasty rulers patronized Shia, Sufi, and Sunni Islamic traditions, as well as Hindu traditions. Before their end, Tana Shah advised by Madanna and Akkanna –his Brahmin ministers, began the tradition of sending pearls to the Bhadrachalam Temple of Rama on Rama Navami.

== List of rulers ==
The eight sultans in the dynasty were:

Personal Name	Titular Name	Reign		Notes
Personal Name	Titular Name	From	Until	Notes
Sultan Quli سلطان قلی	Sultan Quli Qutb-ul-Mulk	7 December 1518	2 September 1543	Founder of Qutb Shahi Dynasty; Son of Uways Quli Beg; Great Grand Son of Qara Yusuf
Jamsheed جمشید	Jamsheed Quli Qutb Shah	2 September 1543	22 January 1550	Second Son of Sultan Quli Qutb-ul-Mulk
Subhan سبحان	Subhan Quli Qutb Shah	22 January 1550	1550	Son of Jamsheed Quli Qutb Shah; Became King at the age of 7 and died after a short time
Ibrahim ابراہیم	Ibrahim Quli Qutb Shah Wali	27 July 1550	5 June 1580	Younger Son of Sultan Quli Qutb-ul-Mulk; Fought the Battle of Talikota with the Alliance of Deccan Sultanates
Muhammad Ali محمد علی	Muhammad Quli Qutb Shah	5 June 1580	11 January 1612	Son of Ibrahim Quli Qutb Shah Wali; Founder of Hyderabad City; Muhammad Ali was a Scholar in Arabic, Persian, Urdu and Telugu languages
Sultan Muhammad محمد سلطان	Sultan Muhammad Qutb Shah	11 January 1612	1626	Son of Muhammad Amin Shah; Grand Son of Ibrahim Quli Qutb Shah; Son in Law of Muhammad Quli Qutb Shah
Abdullah عبداللہ	Abdullah Qutb Shah	1626	21 April 1672	Son of Sultan Muhammad Qutb Shah
Abul Hasan ابُل حسن	Tana Shah	21 April 1672	22 September 1687	Son in law of Abdullah Qutb Shah; Defeated and jailed by Mughal Emperor Aurangzeb Alamgir in 1687; He died in prison.

== Genealogy of the House of Qutb-Shahi ==
House of Qutb-Shahi

Golconda Sultanate

Sultan-Quli; Qutb-Shah r. 1518–1543
Jamshid-Quli; Qutb-Shah r. 1543–1550	Ibrahim-Quli; Qutb-Shah r. 1550–1580
Subhan-Quli; Qutb-Shah r. 1550–1550	Muhammad-Quli; Qutb-Shah r. 1580–1612	Muhammad-Amin
Hayat-Bakhshi	Muhammad; Qutb-Shah r. 1612–1626
Abdullah; Qutb-Shah r. 1626–1672
Abu'l-Hasan; Qutb-Shah r. 1672–1687	Padishah

== See also ==
- Hyderabad State
- Battle of Talikota
- Adil Shahi–Portuguese conflicts
