= Morteza Qoli Kandi =

Coordinates: 37°01′30″N 47°11′16″E

Morteza Qoli Kandi مرتضي قلي كندي
- Village
- Interactive map of Morteza Qoli Kandi
- Country: Iran
- Province: East Azerbaijan
- County: Charuymaq
- Bakhsh: Shadian
- Rural District: Charuymaq-e Jonubesharqi

Population (2006)
  - Total: 56
- Time zone: UTC+3:30 (IRST)
  - Summer (DST): UTC+4:30 (IRDT)

Morteza Qoli Kandi (Persian: مرتضي قلي كندي, also Romanized as Morteẕá Qolī Kandī) is a village in Charuymaq-e Jonubesharqi Rural District, Shadian District, Charuymaq County, East Azerbaijan Province, Iran. At the 2006 census, its population was 56, in 9 families.
