= Rzaguliyev =

Rzaguliyev (Azerbaijani: Rzaquliyev) is an Azerbaijani surname. Notable people with the surname include:

- Alakbar Rzaguliyev (1903–1974), Azerbaijani artist
- Elbey Rzaguliyev (1926–2007), Azeribaijani Soviet artist and stage director

== See also ==
- Rzagulu
