= Hoseyn Qoli, Kerman =

Hoseyn Qoli حسين قلي
- Village
- Location within Iran
- Coordinates: 29°09′11″N 57°49′53″E
- Country: Iran
- Province: Kerman
- County: Bam
- Bakhsh: Central
- Rural District: Howmeh

Population (2006)
  - Total: 32
- Time zone: UTC+3:30 (IRST)
  - Summer (DST): UTC+4:30 (IRDT)

Hoseyn Qoli (Persian: حسين قلي, also Romanized as Ḩoseyn Qolī; also known as Ḩasan Qolī) is a village in Howmeh Rural District, in the Central District of Bam County, Kerman Province, Iran. At the 2006 census, its population was 32, in 8 families.
