= Molangur =

- village
- Country: India
- State: Telangana

Languages
  - Official: Telugu
- Time zone: UTC+5:30 (IST)

Molangur is a village in Karimnagar district, Telangana. It is 30 km from the town of Karimnagar. There are still ruins of Molangur fort visited by some tourists.
