= Tahmasb Qoli =

Tahmasb Qoli طهماسب قلي
- Village
- Location within Iran
- Coordinates: 35°15′00″N 47°29′24″E
- Country: Iran
- Province: Kurdistan
- County: Dehgolan
- Bakhsh: Central
- Rural District: Howmeh-ye Dehgolan

Population (2006)
  - Total: 316
- Time zone: UTC+3:30 (IRST)
  - Summer (DST): UTC+4:30 (IRDT)

Tahmasb Qoli (Persian: طهماسب قلي, also Romanized as Ţahmāsb Qolī and Ţahmāseb Qolī; also known as Ţahmāsb Qal‘eh and Tehmasp Qulleh) is a village in Howmeh-ye Dehgolan Rural District, in the Central District of Dehgolan County, Kurdistan Province, Iran. At the 2006 census, its population was 316, in 75 families. The village is populated by Kurds.
