= Quli Qutb Shah =

Sultan of Golconda from 1518 to 1543

Sultan Quli
- Qutb-ul-Mulk (Pillar of the Realm)
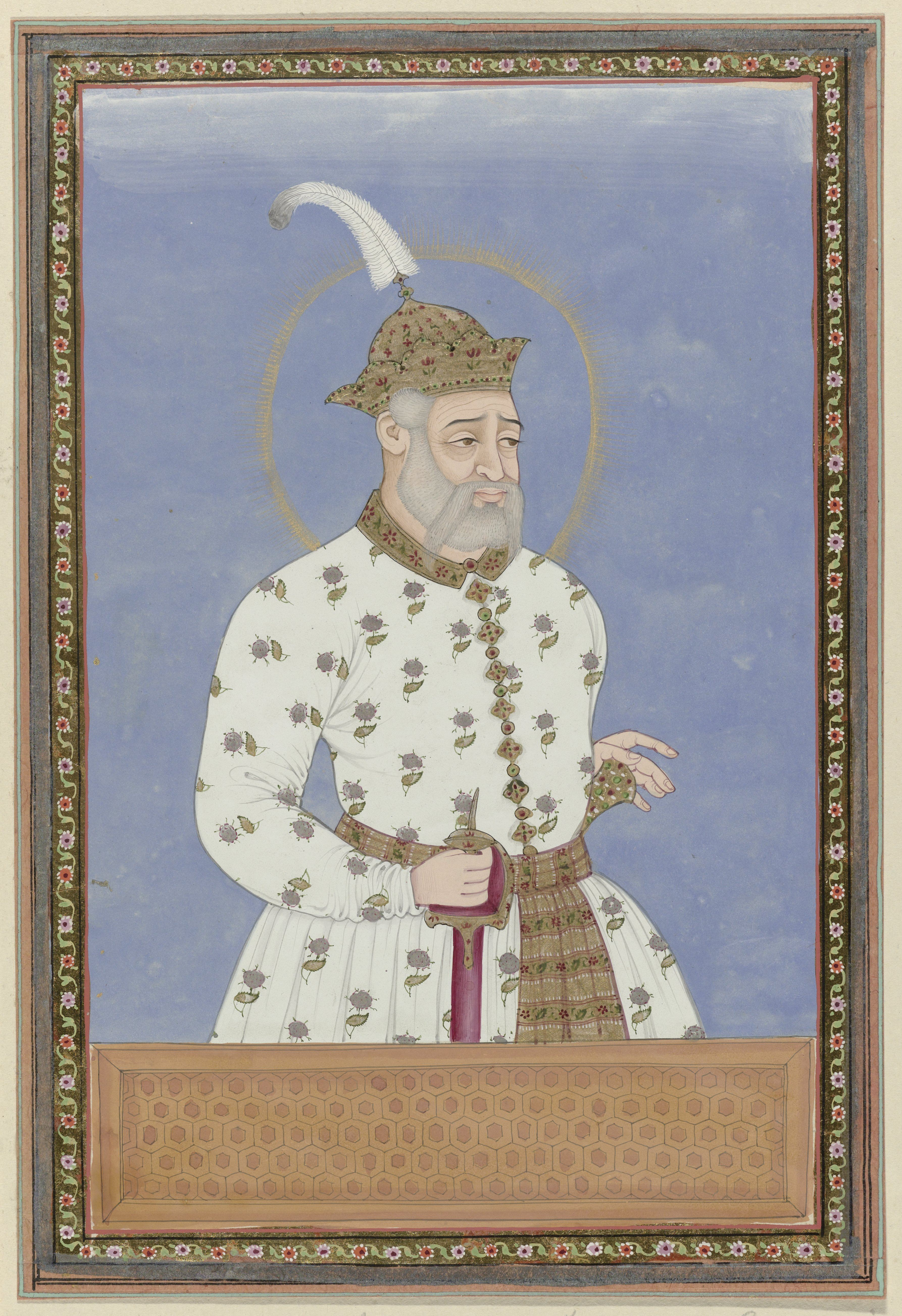
- c. 1686 portrait of Sultan Quli

1st Ruler of Golconda
- Reign: 7 December 1518 – 2 September 1543
- Predecessor: Position established
- Successor: Jamsheed Quli Qutb Shah
- Born: 1485; Hamadan, Aq Qoyunlu
- Died: 2 September 1543 (aged 57–58); Hyderabad, Sultanate of Golconda
- Burial: Qutb Shahi tombs, Hyderabad
- Issue: Qutbuddin; Jamsheed; Abdul Khadir; Abdul Karim; Husayn; Ibrahim
- House: Qutb Shahi
- Dynasty: Qara Qoyunlu
- Father: Uways Quli Beg
- Mother: Maryam Khanum
- Religion: Shia Islam

Sultan Quli Qutb-ul-Mulk, more often though less correctly referred to in English as Quli Qutb Shah (Note: "Sultan" was a part of his name, Sultan Quli (also spelled Sultan-Quli), the whole of which meaning 'slave of the sultan' or 'slave of the ruler' (see other male given names built from Quli at "Quli (Turkic)"); and he never proclaimed his kingship (the first of his successors to do so was Ibrahim Quli Qutb Shah).) (1485 – 2 September 1543), was the founder of the Qutb Shahi dynasty, which ruled the Sultanate of Golconda in southern India from 1518 to 1687. Of Turkoman origin and born in Persia, he originally served the Bahmani sultan, and was awarded the title Qutb-ul-Mulk (Pillar of the Realm) as military chief; he eventually took control of Golconda.

== Background ==
Originally named Sultan Quli, he was a Shi'i Turkoman from the city of Hamadan in Persia. He was the son of Uways Quli Beg, of the Qara Qoyunlu dynasty, and Maryam Khanum, a daughter of the Hamadan noble Malik Saleh. Through his father, he was descended from the Turkoman ruler Qara Yusuf twice over; his grandparents, Pir Quli Beg and Khadija Begum, were grandchildren of Qara Yusuf's sons Qara Iskander and Jahan Shah respectively.

He migrated to Delhi with some of his relatives and friends, including his uncle Allah Quli Beg, at the beginning of the 16th century. Later, he travelled south to Deccan and served the Bahmani sultan. Due to his successful leadership in military conflicts, he received the title "Qutb-ul-Mulk".

== Establishing the Qutb Shahi Sultanate ==
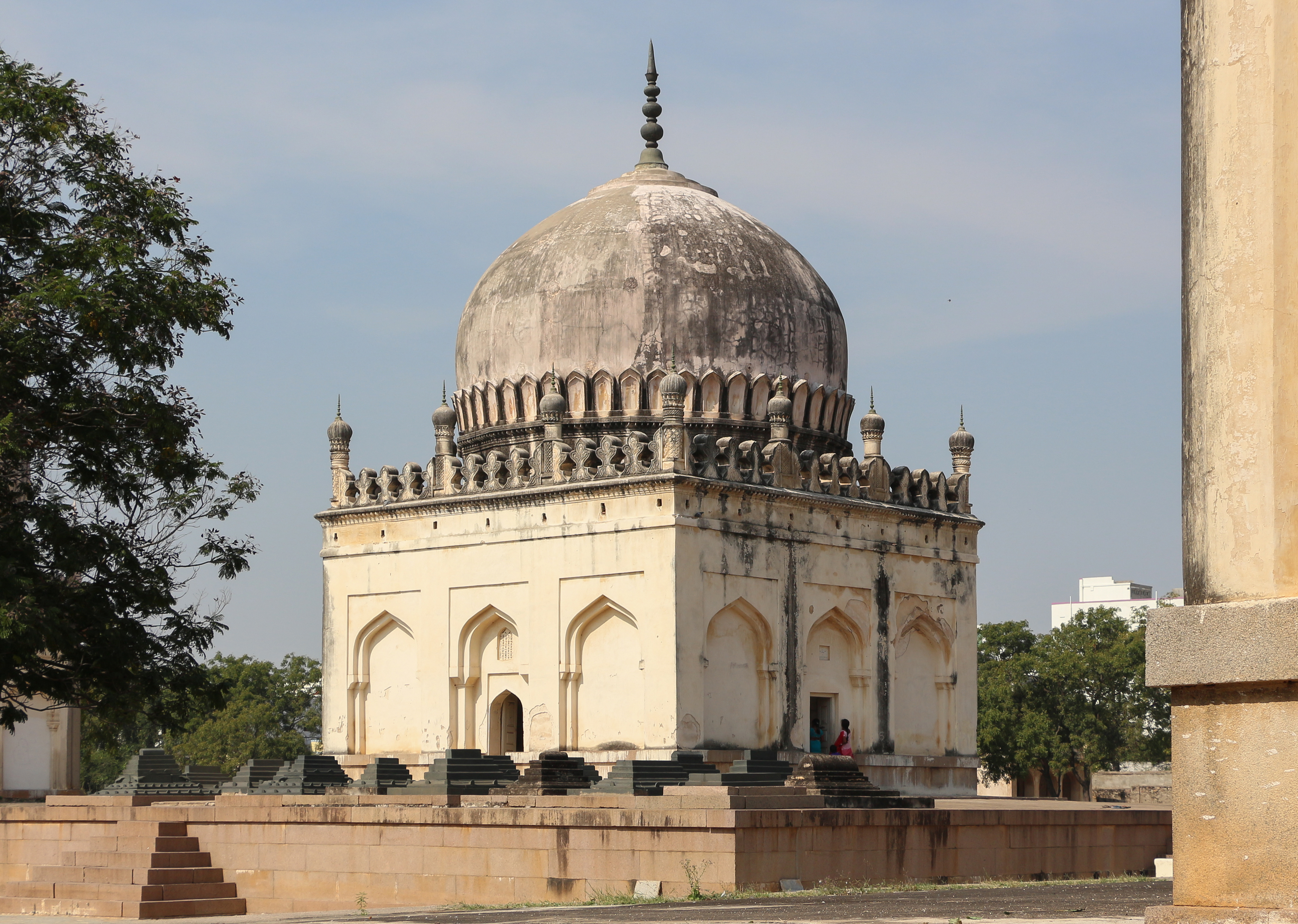
Tomb of Sultan Quli Qutb Shah in Hyderabad

After the disintegration of the Bahmani Sultanate into the five Deccan sultanates, he declared independence and took the title of Qutb Shah, and established the Qutb Shahi dynasty of Golconda. Even though there is ample evidence that he never proclaimed his kingship. The inscription on his grave itself names him as Sultan Quli Qutb-ul-Mulk:

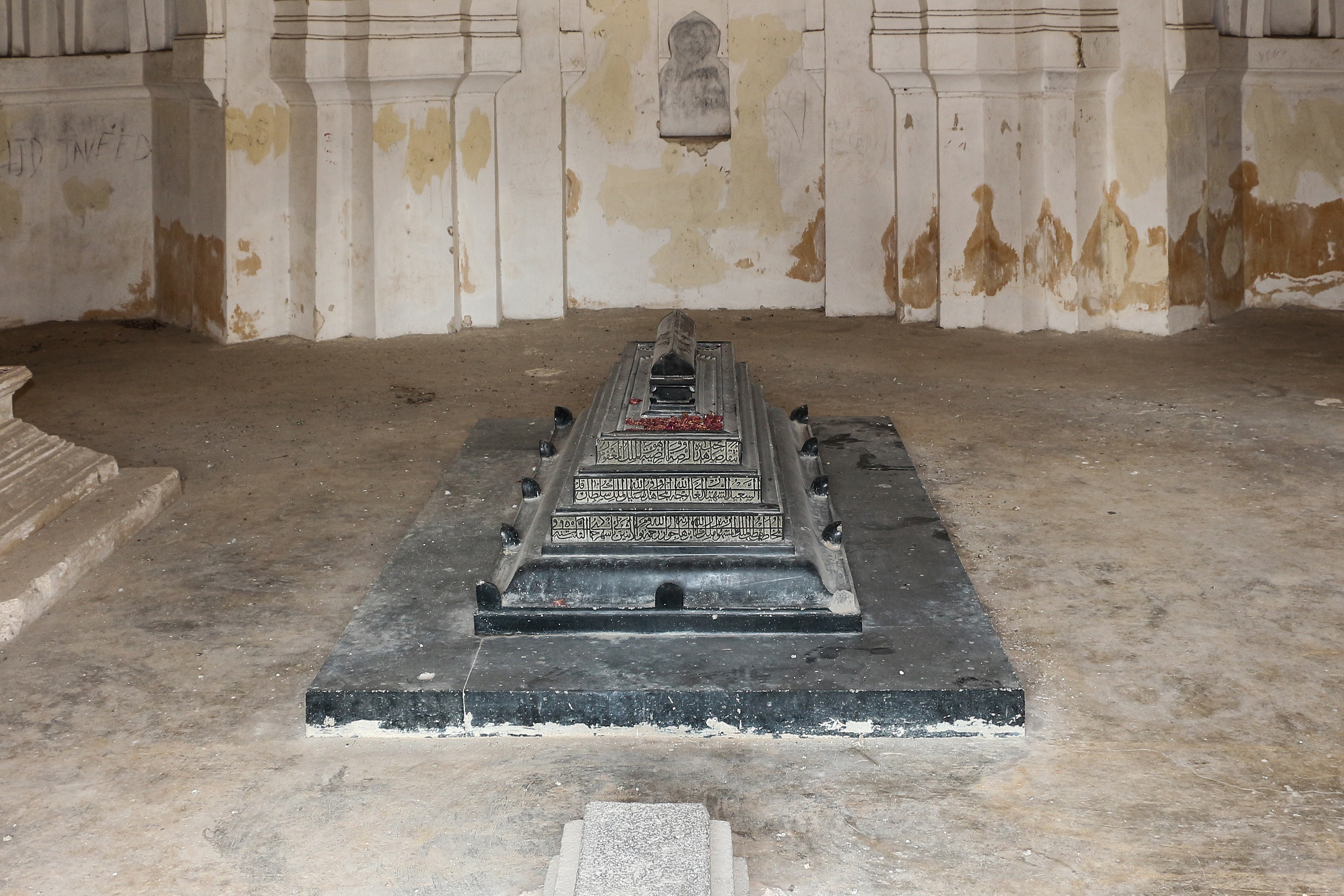
His grave

انتقل صاحب هذه الروضة الرضية وهو الملك المغفور

السعيد الشهيد الغازي لوجه الله والمجاهد في سبيل الله الملك سلطان قلي

المخاطب به قطب الملك المشهور به بر ملك انار الله برهانه الى جوار رحمه الله في يوم الاثنين ثاني شهر جمادى الثانية سنة ٩٥٠

Many historians have misattributed the word 'Sultan' in his name but his whole name just meant 'Servant of the Sultan' just like his Uncle Allah Quli which meant 'Servant of Allah'.

== Extension of the Sultanate ==
Sultan Quli Qutb Shah was a contemporary of Krishana Deva Raya and his younger brother Achyuta Deva Raya of the Vijayanagara Empire. Sultan Quli extended his rule by capturing forts at Warangal, Kondapalli, Eluru, and Rajamundry, while Krishnadevaraya was fighting the ruler of Odisha. He defeated Sitapati Raju (known as Shitab Khan), the ruler of Khammam, and captured the fort. He forced Jeypore's ruler Vishwanath Dev Gajapati to surrender all the territories between the mouths of Krishna and Godavari rivers. In 1513, Krishnadevaraya commanded Vijayanagar forces against Golconda Sultan Quli Qutb Shah in Pangala. The Vijayanagar army, however, faced defeat, resulting in the capture of the Pangal fort by Golconda forces. Consequently, Raya retreated from the battle.

== Death and succession ==
In 1543, while he was offering his prayers, Sultan Quli Qutb Shah was assassinated by his second son, Jamsheed Quli Qutb Shah. Jamsheed Quli also blinded Sultan Quli's eldest son and heir, Qutbuddin Quli, and assumed the throne. His sixth son Ibrahim Quli Qutub Shah fled to Vijayanagara. Jamsheed Quli also killed his brother (the third son of Sultan Quli), Abdul Qadeer, who had revolted after their father's death.

== Notes ==
Preceded by -	Quli Qutb Shah; 7 December 1518 – 2 September 1543	Succeeded by Jamsheed Quli Qutb Shah
