= Kulov =

Kulov is a Slovak and Kyrgyz (Cyrillic: Кулов) masculine surname. Its feminine counterpart is Kulová in Slovak and Kulova in Kyrgyz (Cyrillic: Кулова). Notable people with the surname include:

- Felix Kulov (born 1948), Kyrgyz politician
