= Jamsheed Quli Qutb Shah =

Sultan of Golconda from 1543 to 1550

- Sultan
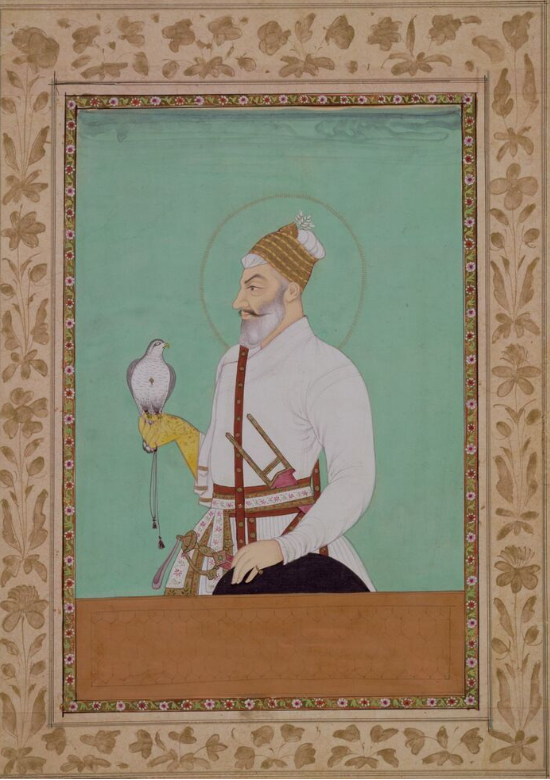

2nd Ruler of Golconda
- Reign: 2 September 1543 – 22 January 1550
- Predecessor: Sultan Quli Qutb-ul-Mulk
- Successor: Subhan Quli Qutb Shah
- Died: 22 January 1550
- Issue: Subhan Quli Qutb Shah
- House: Qutb Shahi
- Dynasty: Qara Qoyunlu
- Father: Sultan Quli Qutb-ul-Mulk
- Religion: Shia Islam

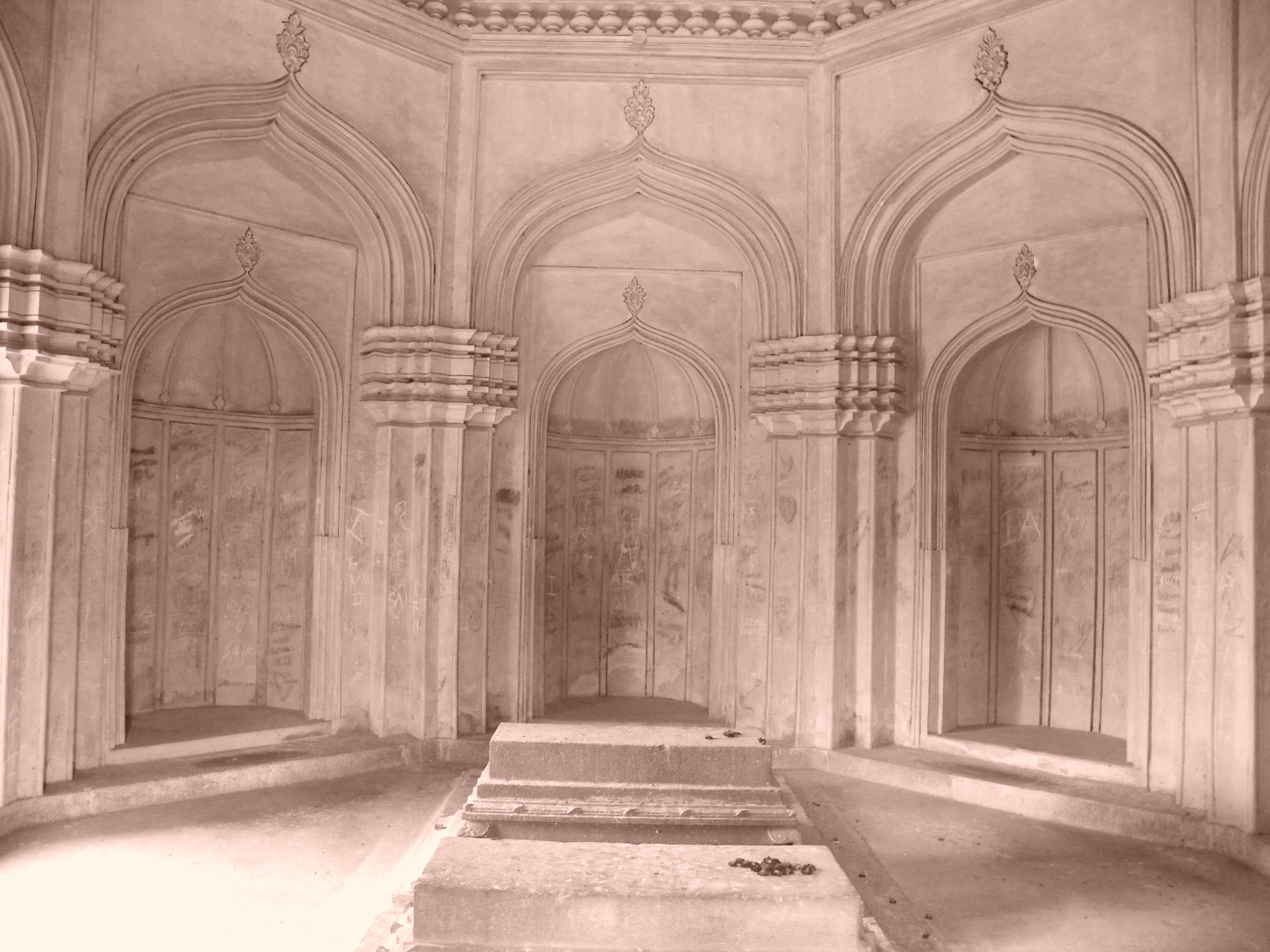
The grave of the 2nd Sultan, Jamshed Quli Qutub Shah

Jamsheed Quli Qutb Shah (also transliterated in different ways) was the second ruler of the Sultanate of Golkonda under the Qutb Shahi dynasty from 1543 until his death in 1550.

His father, Sultan Quli Qutb-ul-Mulk, had established the dynasty and had become the first Muslim to rule over the entire Telugu region. In 1543, Jamsheed Quli Qutb Shah assassinated his father, blinded his older brother, the heir to the throne, and forced his other brother, Ibrahim Quli, to flee to Vijayanagar. Following his father's death, he did not proclaim himself sultan, but forced local chiefs to accept his suzerainty, while gaining some forts from the Baridis.

Little is known of Jamsheed's reign, but he is remembered as having been cruel. He died on 22 January 1550 from cancer.

== Biography ==
=== Role in Quli Qutb-ul-Mulk's death ===
Jamsheed's father, Sultan Quli Qutb-ul-Mulk, was the progenitor of the Qutb Shahi dynasty, and ruled over the region of Telangana for nearly twenty-five years, although never formally assuming kingship. In 1543, he was assassinated. Most contemporary sources, including Firishta and the Tawarikh-i-Qutb Shahi describe this assassination as a case of patricide by Jamsheed.

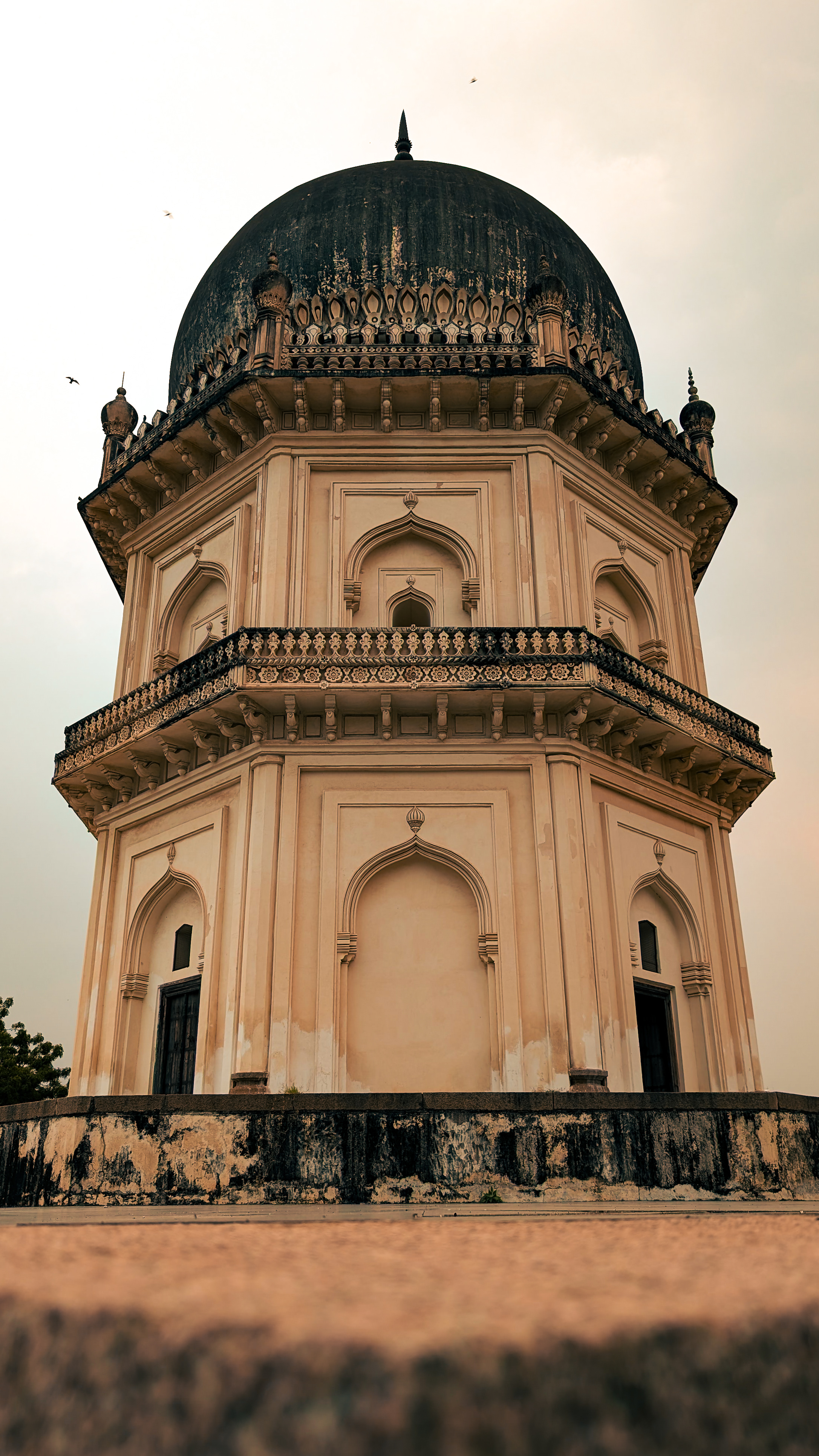
Mausoleum of Jamsheed Quli Qutb Shah

However, modern historians, including H. K. Sherwani argue that both Firishta's work and the Tawarikh-i-Qutb Shahi were compiled much later, during the reign of the descendants of Ibrahim Qutb Shah, who was Jamsheed's younger brother, and would therefore be inclined to portray Jamsheed as having a part in the assassination of his father, adding legitimacy to Ibrahim's claim.

The Tawarikh-i-Qutb Shahi relates that after Jamsheed returned to Golconda for the first time after his father's death, he spent three days and three nights weeping at his father's mausoleum. Only after distributing a large amount of gold and silver to the poor, for the repose of his father's soul, did he leave the premises. Following this, he declared that in no way was he connected to the murder, and ordered a search for the culprit. A few days later, the assassin was arrested after being identified by the imam of a mosque he had taken refuge in.

Jamsheed, after learning of the arrest, ordered celebrations to be held in the capital, and personally rebuked the assassin as having stained his white beard with the blood of a venerable person such as his father. The assassin was bound to an elephant's leg, and dragged about for three days, being pelted with stones and brickbats. Furthermore, he was cremated rather than being buried according to Islamic rites.

=== Assuming kingship, and Ibrahim's exile ===
After a three-day mourning period, Jamsheed held durbar, and proclaimed himself to be the rightful successor of his father. To cut off any challenge to his succession, he had blinded one of his brothers. By this time, Ibrahim, another of his brothers, was in Devarakonda. The only Deccani ruler who had recognized Jamsheed's accession was Burhan Nizam Shah of Ahmadnagar. The rulers of Bidar, Bijapur, and Vijayanagara, supported Ibrahim's claim.

Ali Barid and Ibrahim now marched towards Golconda. Jamsheed's army marched out to face them, and after a short battle near Narsingi, realizing his losing position, Jamshid ordered a retreat to the fort. The invading army laid siege of Golconda. Jamsheed's ally Burhan Nizam Shah presently marched to the aid of Jamsheed, passing through Kohir, which was a part of Baridi territory, which he took, along with much wealth that had been present there. Upon hearing of this, Ali Barid retreated back to his territory, and Ibrahim, fled to Vijayanagara.

Jamsheed hosted Burhan at Golconda, and the latter offered to coronate him, and urged him to accept a royal umbrella. Jamsheed refused, possibly fearing that accepting a crown at the hands of Burhan might signify that Golconda had become a protectorate of Ahmadnagar.

=== Death ===
After suffering from cancer in his back for about two years, Jamsheed died on 22 January 1550.

Preceded by Sultan Quli Qutb-ul-Mulk	Qutb Shahi dynasty 1543–1550	Succeeded by Subhan Quli Qutb Shah
