= Subhan Quli Qutb Shah =

Sultan of Golconda in 1550

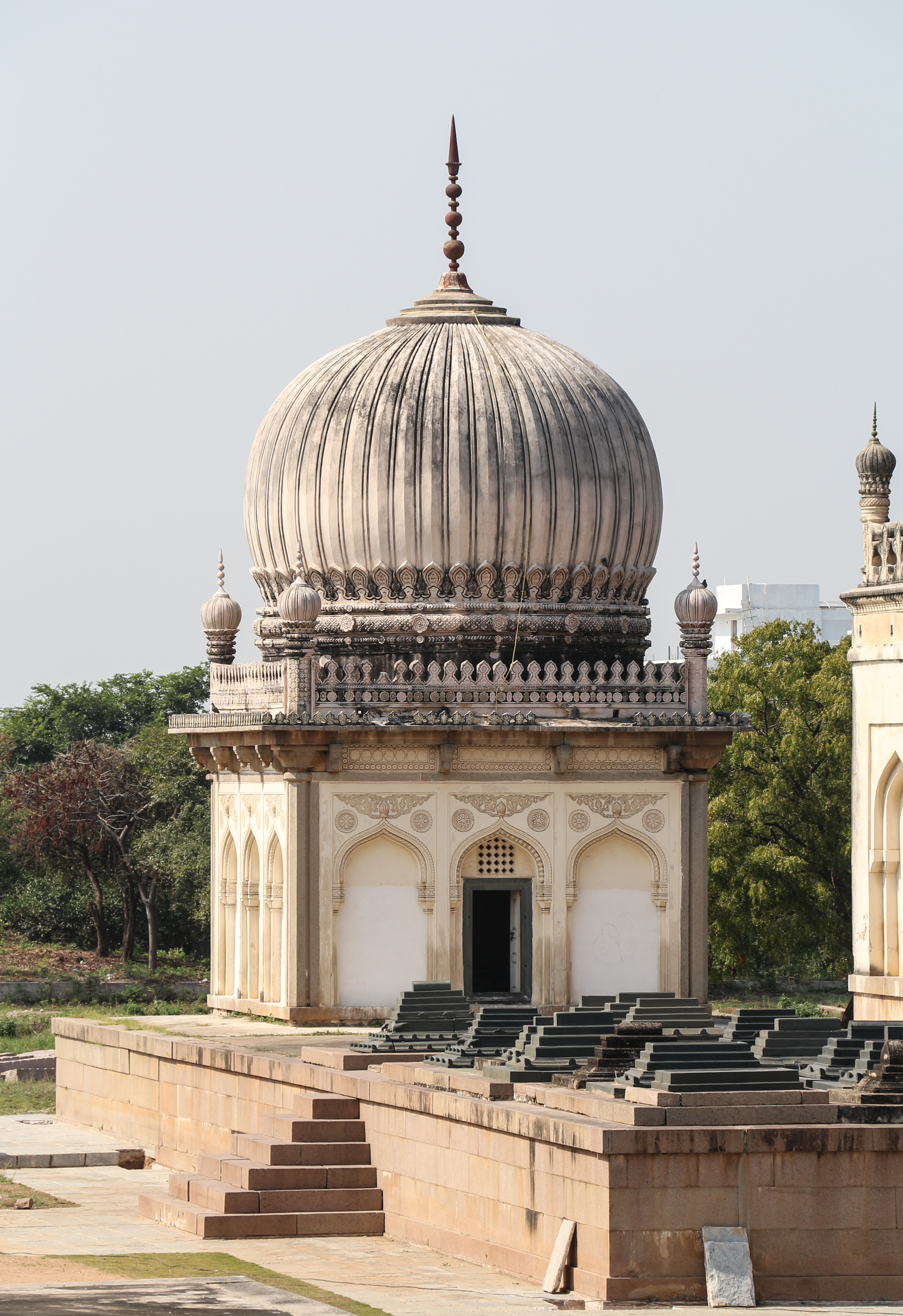
- Tomb Of Subhan Quli Qutub Shah At Qutub Shahi Tombs, Hyderabad

3rd Ruler of Golconda
- Reign: 22 January 1550 – 27 July 1550
- Predecessor: Jamsheed Quli Qutb Shah
- Successor: Ibrahim Quli Qutb Shah
- Born: 1543
- Died: 1550 (aged 6–7)
- House: Qutb Shahi
- Dynasty: Qara Qoyunlu
- Father: Jamsheed Quli Qutb Shah
- Religion: Shia Islam

Subhan Quli Qutb Shah (1543–1550) was 7 years old, when he became Sultan of Golconda, after the death of his father Jamsheed Quli Qutb Shah, in 1550. Saif Khan, also known as Ainul Mulk, was sent from Ahmednagar for the performance of duties of regent during the boy's development. But Jamsheed's younger brother Ibrahim Quli Qutb Shah returned from Vijayanagara to Golconda, and ascended the throne. Subhan was deposed, and died of illness or was murdered in the same year.

Preceded by Jamsheed Quli Qutb Shah	Qutb Shahi dynasty 1550	Succeeded by Ibrahim Quli Qutb Shah
