= Ibrahim Quli Qutb Shah Wali =

Sultan of Golconda from 1550 to 1580

- Portrait of Ibrahim Quli Qutub Shah

4th Sultan of Golconda
- Reign: 27 July 1550 – 5 June 1580
- Coronation: 27 July 1550
- Predecessor: Subhan Quli Qutb Shah
- Successor: Muhammad Quli Qutb Shah
- Born: 29 May 1530
- Died: 5 June 1580 (aged 50)
- Spouse: Bhagirathi; Bibi Jamil
- Issue: Muhammad Quli Qutb Shah; Mirza Muhammad Amin; Chand Sultana
- House: Qutb Shahi
- Dynasty: Qara Qoyunlu
- Father: Quli Qutb Mulk
- Religion: Shia Islam

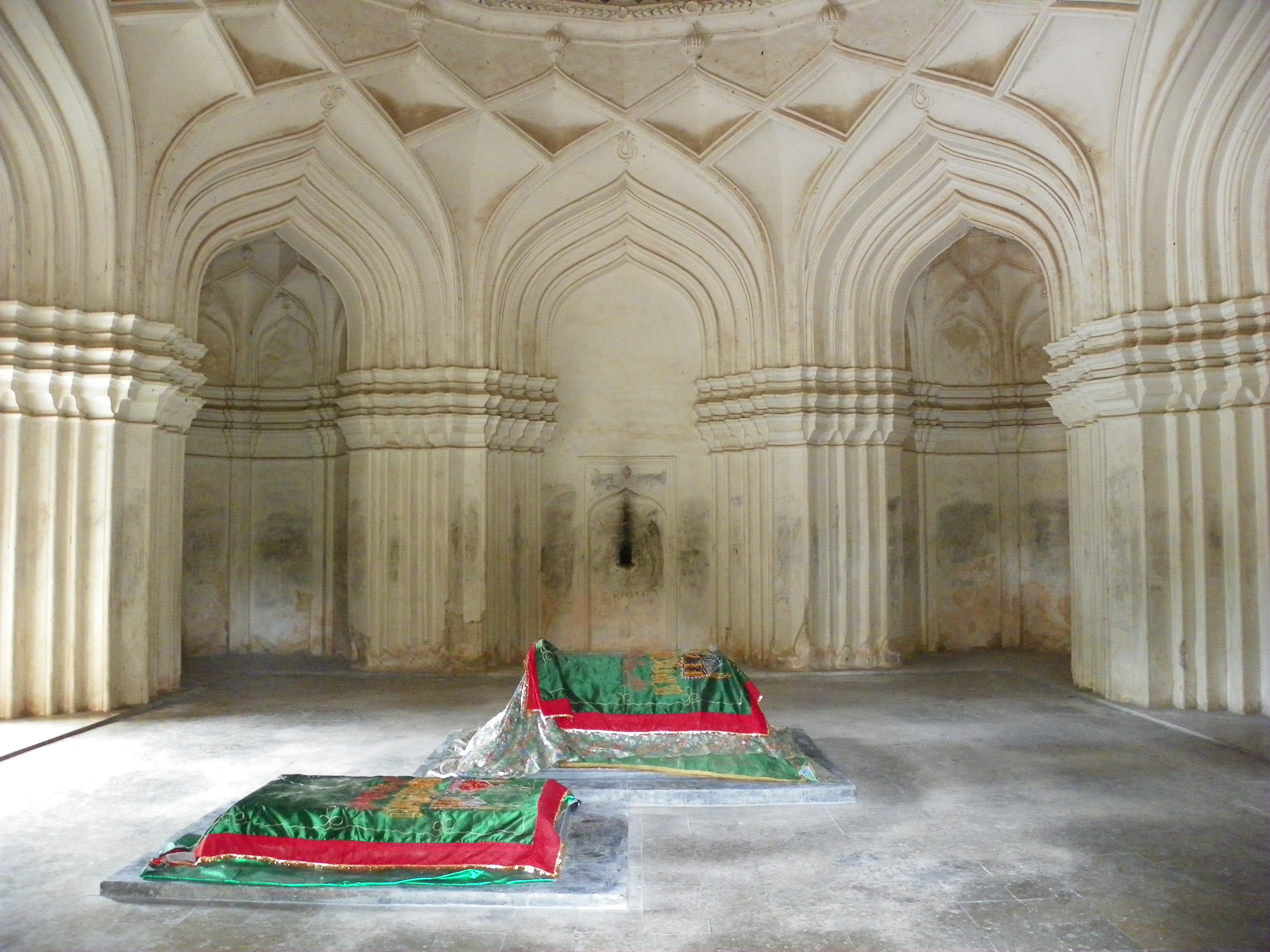
Inside Sultan Ibrahim Qutub Shah's tomb

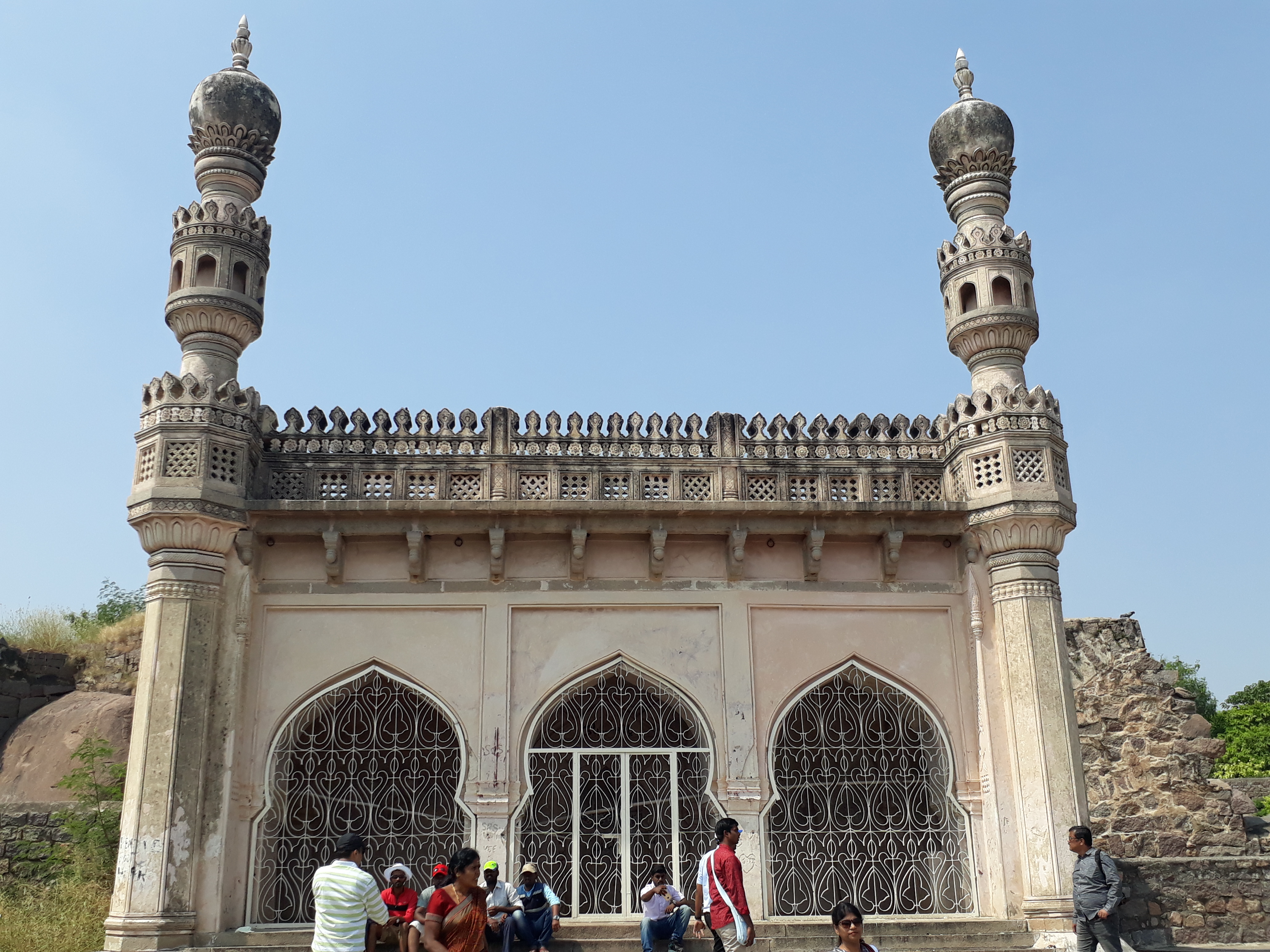
Mosque attributed to Ibrahim Quli Qutb Shah in Golconda Fort

Ibrahim Qutb Shah Wali (29 May 1530 – 5 June 1580), also known by his Telugu names Malki Bharama and Ibharama Chakravarti, was the fourth monarch of the kingdom of Golconda in southern India. He was the first of the Qutb Shahi dynasty to use the title "Sultan". He ruled from 1550 to 1580. He lived for seven years in exile at the court of Vijayanagara as an honoured guest of its ruler Rama Raya. Ibrahim is known for patronizing Telugu extensively because he was moved by a genuine love for the language.

== Early life ==
Ibrahim was born the son of Quli Qutb Mulk, founder of the Qutb Shahi dynasty of Golconda. His father, an ethnic Turkmen, had emigrated to India with his family as a young man and taken employment in the court of the Bahmani Sultanate in the Deccan. He had risen steadily through the army ranks and, when the Bahamani sultanate had splintered and collapsed, he had carved out a sizable principality for himself by force of arms. Ibrahim was one of Quli Qutb Mulk's younger sons.

== Exile ==
In 1543, after achieving so much and living such an extraordinary life, Quli Qutb Mulk was killed by his own son, Jamsheed, while he was offering his prayers one day. The assassin, who was Ibrahim's brother, made every effort to capture, kill, or mutilate all his brothers. He managed to capture and blind his eldest brother, crown prince Qutbuddin, but Ibrahim somehow managed to escape. He fled Golconda and took refuge in the court of the powerful Hindu ruler of Vijayanagara. Here he lived in exile as an honored guest of the powerful patriarch of Vijayanagara, Rama Raya. He lived at the Vijayanagara court for seven years (1543–50). When Jamsheed died due to cancer on 22 January 1550, there was internal chaos within the kingdom. His son Subhan who was only an infant, was placed on the throne by Mustapha Khan. Jagadev Rao, Chief of the Naikwari, tried to place Jamsheed's brother Daulat Quli, who instead wanted Ibrahim to be the king, on the throne. This led to his imprisonment in Bala Hisar, the highest point of the Golkonda fort. Some discontented elements within the kingdom summoned Ibrahim to end his exile and claim the throne for himself.

During his sojourn in Vijayanagara, Ibrahim developed very close and loving ties with the imperial family and with important members of the nobility. He also became deeply influenced by Hindu, Telugu culture. He adopted Hindu/Telugu ways of dress, food, etiquette, and above all, speech. He developed a strong love for the Telugu language, which he patronized and encouraged throughout his reign. Indeed, he even went so far as to adopt a new name for himself, "Malki BhaRama," which is his own name spoken with a strong, rustic Telugu accent. He used this name for himself in various official letters and documents and it therefore gained official recognition. According to a court poet, Ibrahim would sit, "floating on waves of bliss," while listening to the Mahabharata being recited in Telugu rather than Sanskrit. It is said that the court of Ibrahim Qutb Shah had many scholars learned in the Vedas, Sastras, and Puranas.

== Reign ==
Such favourable attitudes to Hindus had an effect. Ibrahim during his early reign got support from Telugu noblemen. In 1550 when Ibrahim was returning to Golconda, two envoys were sent to the sultan from the fort of Koilkonda pledging allegiance to him. He was crowned on 27 July 1550, upon returning to Golconda. According to the long inscription at the fort, the Hindus pledged allegiance to him, and anyone who 'dealt with any other person other than Ibrahim' would be considered being of low birth and would incur the sin of having killed cows and Brāhmaṇas at Varanasi.

In Vijayanagara, Ibrahim married Bagiradhi (correctly: "Bhagirathi"), a Hindu woman, according to Hindu rites and customs. Bagiradhi was also known as "Kaavya kanyaka" and she came from a family with a legacy in music and dance rooted in Hindu, and south Indian traditions. The son born to Ibrahim and Bhagirathi, Muhammad Quli Qutb Shah, would succeed his father to become the 5th ruler of the dynasty.

Ibrahim employed Hindus for administrative, diplomatic, and military purposes within his sultanate. A patron of the arts and of Telugu literature, Ibrahim sponsored many court poets, such as Singanacharyudu, Addanki Gangadharudu, Ponnanganti Telenganaraya, and Kandukuru Rudrakavi. There were Telugu poets, in a break from tradition. He also patronized Arabic and Persian poets in his court. He is also known in Telugu literature as Malki Bharama (his adopted Telugu name). Ibrahim repaired and fortified Golconda Fort and developed the Hussain Sagar lake and Ibrahim Bagh. He is described in one of the inscriptions on the "Makki Darwaza" in the fort as "The Greatest of Sovereigns".

In 1565, Ibrahim took advantage of internal conflicts in Vijayanagara. He became part of a cabal of Muslim rulers of small states which banded together to destroy the Hindu kingdom of Vijayanagara. He thus betrayed Rama Raya of Vijayanagara, who had given him shelter during his exile from 1543 to 1550. In the Battle of Talikota which ensued, Rama Raya was killed and the city where Ibrahim had spent seven happy and safe years was razed to the ground; the remnants of its former glory can be seen in the lfixl of Hampi today. Following the battle of Talikota in 1565, Ibrahim was able to expand his own kingdom by taking the important hill forts of Adoni and Udayagiri, which commanded an extensive territory and which had been prized possessions of his former host.

== Death ==
After a short illness, Ibrahim died on 5 June 1580. He was succeeded by his son, Muhammad Quli Qutb Shah, who was born to his Hindu wife Bhagirathi.

== Family ==
=== Wives ===
- Bhagirathi of Vijayanagar
- Bibi Jamil; daughter of Sultan Hussain Nizam Shah I of Ahmadnagar

=== Issue ===
- Abdul Qadir, eldest son, predeceased his father
- Husain Quli
- Muhammad Quli Qutb Shah
- Abdul Fattah
- Khuda Banda
- Mirza Muhammad Amin (d. 1596); father of Muhammad Qutb Shah
- Chand Sultan; married Sultan Ibrahim Adil Shah II of Bijapur

Preceded by: Subhan Quli Qutb Shah	Qutb Shahi dynasty 1550–1580	Succeeded by: Muhammad Quli Qutb Shah
