= List of wars involving Iran (before 1979) =

This is a list of wars involving Iran before 1979, i.e., the predecessor states of today's Islamic Republic of Iran. It is an unfinished historical overview.

== Elamite civilisation ==
Conflict	Ancient Iranian State (and allies)	Opponents	Results	Notes
Elamite invasion of Sumer (Circa 2600 BC)	Awan Elam	Sumer: Ur	Victory	Deposition of Balulu, end of First Dynasty of Ur and establishment of the Elamyte dynasty.
Sumerian invasion of Elam (Circa 2400 BC)	Awan Elam Kish Akshak Umma	Sumer: Lagash	Defeat	Eannatum manage to conquer parts of Elam (destroying Susa) and develop one of the first recorded empires.
Elamite-Sumer skirmishes. (Circa 2400 BC)	Awan Elam Marhasi	Sumer: Lagash; Kish	Stalemate	Elamite's success to expel Sumer's incursions from Iranian Plateau and sack some Sumer city states in Mesopotamia, but governors like Enentarzi expel them from its domains.
Akkadian conquest of Elam: Sargon campaign; Rimush campaign; Manishtushu campaign; (Circa 2300-2200 BC)	Elam Marhasi Gutian people Pashime	Akkadian Empire	Defeat	South-Western Iran is conquered by Sargon of Akkad, his son Rimush defeat the revolts led by Abalgamash, and Manishtushu expands forward Anshan and seizing control of the Persian Gulf.
Narum-Sin campaign on Elam (Circa 2200 BC)	Elam Marhasi co-belligerent: Sumer rebels Gutian people	Akkadian Empire	Ceasefire	Accadian control of Khuzestan is reinforced, installing imperial governors to counter the power from native kings like Khita.
First Shar-Kali-Sharri campaign on Elam (Circa 2100 BC)	Elam	Akkadian Empire	Defeat	Status quo ante bellum
Kutik-Inshushinak campaign against Gutians (Circa 2100 BC)	Akkadian Empire: Elam	Gutian people	Victory	Elamyte-Accadians expand territories on the Zagros Mountains.
Elamyte independence war against Akkadians (Circa 2090 BC)	Elam co-belligerent: Uruk	Akkadian Empire: Eshnunna; Akkad; Akshak; Gutian people	Victory	Acadian empire, after the death of Shar-Kali-Sharri, lost control of Elam.; Elamyte king, Puzur-Inshushinak, conquered Anshan, manage to unite most of Elam into one kingdom, and also expands into parts of central Mesopotamia.; End of Gutian rule in Mesopotamia
Sumerian invasion of Elam (Circa 2090 BC)	Elam Lagash	Neo-Sumerian Empire: Ur; co-belligerent Shimashki dynasty	Defeat	The King of Sumer and Akkad, Ur-Nammu and his son Shulgi, conquers parts of Elam surrounding Susa. The rest of Elam is conquered by the Shimashki dynasty, after the death of Puzur-Inshushinak.
Sumerian border skirmishes on the north-east (Circa 2000 BC)	Simurrum Lullubi co-belligerent Elam	Neo-Sumerian Empire: Ur	Inconclusive	Tribal invasions from Western Iran to Sumer are stopped.
Elamyte conquest of Sumer (Circa 2004/1940 BC)	Shimashki Elam	Neo-Sumerian Empire: Ur	Victory	Elamyte king, Kindattu, capture Sumerian king, Ibbi-Sin. End of the third dynasty of Ur and Elamyte military occupation and rule for 21 years.
Amorite conquest of Sumer (Circa 1900 BC)	Shimashki Elam: Sumer; Akkad	Amorites	Defeat	Ishbi-Erra expel the Elamytes from Ur, then gain the title of King of Sumer and expand over Sumer and Akkad.
Elamite invasion of Babylonia (Circa 1184–1155 BCE)	Elam	Babylonian empire: Kassites	Stalemate	Unsuccessful punitive expedition to defend Meli-Shipak II's claims to Babylon, but the Elamites' plundered the Stele of Naram-Sin and the Stele of Meli-Šipak, as well as the Statue of Marduk in the name of the god Inshushinak.
Babylonian-Elamite War (Circa 1121–1100 BC)	Elam	Babylonian empire: Kassites	Defeat	Nebuchadnezzar I defeated the Elamite king Ḫulteludiš-Inšušinak and retrieved the statue of Marduk and that of the goddess Il-āliya, being alluded in the Marduk prophecy.: Elam is destroyed as a local great power.
Early Assyrian campaigns on Persia (844–693 BC): Elamite-Assyrian wars	Ancient Iran: Elam; Median tribes; Early Persian tribes (Parsua/Parsa)	Neo-Assyrian Empire	Inconclusive	Failure of the Elamites to extend their power beyond the boundaries of Mesopotamia, and of Assyrians to Western Iran.
Revolts against Assyrian domain (722–702 BC): part of Assyrian conquest of Aram,Urartu–Assyria War and War in the Hebrew Bible	Babylonia Aram (Ancient Syrian cities): Hamath; Arpad; Damascus; Qarqar; Philistia Ancient Levant cities: Sumur; Samaria; Gath; Ashdod; Rafah; Ekron; Gibbethon; Rebel Syro-Hittite states: Tabal; Quwê; Carchemish; Rebel Mannaea Medes Rebel Ellipi Supported by: Elam; Northern Israel (until 720 BC); Ancient Egypt; Urartu; Phrygia	Neo-Assyrian Empire: Samerina; Vassalized Mannaea; Vassalized Syro-Hittite states; Cimmerians Kingdom of Judah	Stalemate	The Syrian rebel, Yahu-Bihdi, is flayed alive by Assyrians.; Northern Kingdom of Israel (Samaria) is fully conquered by Assyrians, starting the Assyrian captivity and the Ten Lost Tribes.; The Philistine rebel, Hanunu, is deposed and enslaved in Assur.; Mitatti's uprising in Mannaea (an Iranian state) against King Iranzu (Assyrian vassal) was suppressed; Iranzu's son, Aza, rise to the throne of Mannea, against his pro-Urartu brother, Ullusunu (then he's forced to be pro-Assyrians).; Rusa I of Urartu is defeated and deposed by the Assyrians (but his kingdom maintained independent).; Kurtî of Atunna is crowned by the Assyrians as a Buffer state against Urartu.; Pisiri of Carchemish is deposed and its kingdom annexed.; Assyrians conquers and established provinces on the Iranian Media.; Assyrian re-establish control on Ellipi to counter Elamyte sphere of influence.; The Chaldean rebel, Marduk-apla-iddina II, is exiled to Iranian Elam after being defeated and deposed by Sargon II, who reestablish Assyrian control.
Khumban-Khaldash' raid on Assyria (676 BC)	Elam	Neo-Assyrian Empire	Victory	Elamites looted Assyria. Then Urtak returns the Assyria idols to have good relationships.
Urtak's raid to Babylonia (665 BC)	Elam Arameans: Gambulu	Neo-Assyrian Empire: Babylonia	Inconclusive	Elamite raid provokes the Assyrian conquest as a reprisal.
Assyrian conquest of Elam (653–639 BC): Battle of Ulai; Battle of Susa; part of Campaigns of Esarhaddon	Elam	Neo-Assyrian Empire	Defeat	Assyria conquers the Elamyte domains.

== Median kingdom ==
Conflict	Ancient Iranian State (and allies)	Opponents	Results	Notes
Assyrian invasions of Media (10th – late 7th centuries BC)	Medes	Neo-Assyrian Empire	Defeat	Kingdoms and city-states of western Iran became Assyrian vassals by the times of Esarhaddon at 680/677 BC.
Median independence war from Assyria (Circa 700–678 BC)	Median tribes and clans led by Deioces Supported by: Other ancient Iranian peoples	Neo-Assyrian Empire	Victory	According to tradition, the Median Kingdom is founded under a unified Shah ruling all of the Medes' lands against the fear of Assyrian rule.: Ecbatana is built to be capital of the new kingdom of the Median dynasty.
Scythian invasion of Urartu (the early 7th century BC)	Scythians Supported by: Medes; Cimmerians; Mannaeans	Urartu Supported by: Neo-Assyrian Empire	Stalemate	Raids ended with the death of Išpakāya by Assyrian intervention: Rusa II, built several fortresses in the east of Urartu, including that of Teishebaini, to monitor and repel attacks.; Bartatua reaches an agreement with Assyrians in 672 BCE, becoming the Sythians domains in West Asia as their fief as vassal to Assyria.
Scythian conquest of the Cimmerians (7th century BC)	Cimmerians Supported by: Medes	Scythians	Defeat	Scythia conquers Cimmerian lands.
Scythian invasion of Media (653–652 BC)	Median Kingdom	Scythians: Sakez	Defeat	War between two groups of Iranian peoples: Conquest of Media by Scythians; End of Scythian rule in Media in 597 BC, during reign of Cyaxares
Median invasion of Assyria (the late 7th century BC)	Scythian Empire: Sakez; Medes; Other Iranian peoples: Cimmerians	Neo-Assyrian Empire	Victory	Invasion of the Assyrian Empire by a coalition of Iranian peoples, led by Kashtariti of Media: End of Assyrian rule in Media; Formation of an independent Median kingdom; Median invasion of Assyria repelled
Median invasion of Scythia (625 BC)	Median Kingdom	Scythian Empire: Sakez	Victory	Cyaxares overthrew the Scythian yoke over the Medes in 625 BC and forced them to become a client state of Media.
Median conquest of Parthia (620s)	Median Kingdom	Saka or Dahae: Parthia; Hyrcania	Victory	Parthians accepted Median rule after capturing Queen Zarinaea.
Medo-Babylonian conquest of the Assyrian Empire (626–609 BC): Fall of Tarbiṣu (614 BC); Fall of Assur (614 BC); Battle of Nineveh (612 BC); Siege of Harran (609 BC); Part of War in the Hebrew Bible	Babylonia Median Kingdom (since 614 BC): Persians; Scythians; Supported by: Akkad; Chaldea; Cimmeria	Neo-Assyrian Empire Egypt (since 612 BC)	Victory	Alliance between various people of the region against the Assyrian Empire, led by the Median Kingdom and Babylonia: End of the Neo-Assyrian Empire; Founding of Neo-Babylonian Empire and rise of the Median kingdom; Babylon claimed all Assyrian lands east of the Euphrates and as far as Lake Van in the northeast. Media annexed lands north of Carchemish and of the Euphrates.
Median conquest of Urartu (609–605 BC)	Median Empire Neo-Babylonian Empire	Urartu	Victory	Urartu becomes a subject kingdom of the new Median state.
Egyptian–Babylonian war (605–601 BC): Battle of Carchemish; Part of War in the Hebrew Bible	Neo-Babylonian Empire Median Empire	Egyptian Empire Remnants of the Neo-Assyrian Empire	Victory	End of the Egyptian intervention in the Near East
Siege of Jerusalem (597 BC): Part of Judah's revolts against Babylon (601–586 BC) and War in the Hebrew Bible	Neo-Babylonian Empire Median Empire	Kingdom of Judah	Victory	Babylonian victory after Nebuchadnezzar II requested aid from Cyaxares. Shortly after starts the Babylonian captivity in Jewish history.
Medo-Babylonian conflicts (595–570 BC): Battle between King "Nebuchadnezzar of Assyria" and "Arphaxad of Ecbatana" (583/593 BC) in the Hebrew Bible	Median Empire: Ecbatana; Supported by: Babylonian renegades	Neo-Babylonian Empire: Assyria; Supported by: Medes renegades	Inconclusive	Both empires resume good-to-neutral relationships.
Median-Lydian War (590–585 BC): Battle of the Eclipse	Median Empire	Lydia	Stalemate	End of the conflict due to an eclipse that was interpreted as a sign of the Gods to seek peace.: Median conquest of Cappadocia, with the Halys River as their border with the Lydians.
Medo-Persian conflict (553–550 BCE): Fall of Ecbatana	Medes Empire	Persians	Defeat (Regime change)	Rise of Cyrus the Great

== Achaemenid Empire ==
Conflict	Persia (and allies)	Opponents	Results	Notes
Achaemenid Empire (550–330 BC)
Battle of Hyrba (552 BC)	Persians	Medes Empire	Victory	
Persian Revolt (552–549 BC)	Persians	Median Empire	Victory	By conquering Media, Iran became an empire.
Battle of the Persian border (551 BC)	Persians	Medes Empire	Victory	Persian retreat to Pasargadae
Conquest of Lydia (547 BC): Battle of Pteria; Battle of Thymbra; Siege of Sardis (547 BC)	Persian Empire	Lydian Empire	Victory	Lydia annexed by Iran
Cyrus' first eastern campaign (545–540 BC)	Persian Empire	Gedrosia	Victory	Persian conquest of Bactria, Arachosia, Sogdia, Saka, Chorasmia, Margiana and other provinces in the east after initial defeat
Conquest of Babylonia (540–539 BC): Battle of Opis; Fall of Babylon	Persian Empire	Neo-Babylonian Empire	Victory	Iran annexes the Neo-Babylonian Empire.: End of Babylonian captivity, Ancient Hebrews gets to Return to Zion through Edict of Cyrus on 538 BC. Yehud Medinata is established under the rule of the High Priest of Israel.
Cyrus' second eastern Campaign (533 BC)	Persian Empire	Gedrosia	Victory	Cyrus the Great crossed the Hindu Kush mountains and collected tribute from the Indus vassa cities.
Cyrus' final Campaign to the North (529 BC)	Persian Empire	Scythians: Massagetae; Dahae; Indians	Defeat	The Empress Tomyris kills Cyrus the Great in vengeance for the death of his son, Spargapises. The river Oxus, or Amu Darya, becomes the limit between Persians and Scythians.
Conquest of Egypt (525 BC)	Persian Empire: Satrapy of Arabia	Kingdom of Egypt	Victory	Egypt annexed by Iran. Lost Army of Cambyses
Persian incursions into Nubia (524 BC)	Persian Empire: Satrapy of Kush	Kingdom of Kush	Defeat	Cambyses II fails to expand Achaemenid domains into the south to reach the limits of former Egyptian Empire. Nubians maintains its independence (but paying Tribute with soldiers and "exotic gifts") while Persians establish frontier on Elephantine and an aoutpost at the Dorginarti fortress.
Achaemenid Civil War (522–520 BC): Bardiya's Coup against Cambyses II; Darius' Coup against Bardiya; Hyrcanian Revolt; 520 BC campaign against Central Asian Scythians (Sakā)	Forces loyal to Cambyses II and then to Darius the Great	Forces loyal to Bardiya or Magus Gaumata Rebelling provinces: Elam; Persis; Media; Assyria; Babylonia; Egypt; Parthia; Armenia; Margiana; Sattagydia; Sagartia; Hyrcania; Scythia	Darius' Victory	Ascent of Darius the Great in the war of succession after Cyrus the Great's death; Persian victory over the rebel provinces through the intervention of Parthian forces led by Hystaspes (father of Darius I) in the Battle of Patigrabana; Nebuchadnezzar III and Nebuchadnezzar IV of Babylon and their supporters are executed.; Petubastis III of Egypt disappears
Conquest of India (Indus Valley) (518 – 323 BCE)	Persian Empire: Bactrians; Saka; Parthians; Sogdians; Ionians; Aethiopians	Mahajanapadas: Gandhara kingdom; Sindhu Sauvira kingdom; Kambojas	Victory	Achaemenid military occupation of northwestern regions of India for about two centuries
European Scythian campaign (513 BC)	Persian Empire: Greek vassals; Supported by: Agathyrsi; Androphagi; Melanchlaeni; Neuri; Tauri	Scythians in European Scythia: Budini; Geloni; Sauromatians	Victory	Achaemenid domination of the European Black Sea regions
Greek Revolt (499 BC–493 BC): Part of Greco-Persian Wars	Persian Empire	Greeks: Ionia; Aeolis; Doris; Caria; Athens; Eretria; Cyprus	Victory	Persia re-establishes control over Greek regions in Asia Minor and Cyprus
Greco-Persian War (First) (492–490 BC): Part of Greco-Persian Wars	Persian Empire	Greeks: Athens; Eretria; Other Greek city-states	Undecided	Persia conquers Macedonia and the Cycladic Islands, re-subjugates Thrace, but fails in an attempt to subjugate Athens and Sparta
Egyptian Revolt (486 BC)	Persian Empire	Egyptian rebels lead by Psammetichus IV	Victory	Revolt suppressed
Babylonian revolts (484 BC)	Persian Empire	Babylon; Sippar; Borsippa; Kish; Dilbat; Other Babylonian cities	Victory	Persians punish the rebelling Babylonian cities, reducing the size of their Satrapies and fomenting minority religions.
Greco-Persian War (Second) (480–478 BC): Part of Greco-Persian Wars	Persian Empire: Greek vassals: Boeotia; Thessalia; Macedon; Thebes; Halicarnassus; Satrapy of Lydia; Satrapy of Arabia	Greeks: Athens; Sparta; Other Greek city states	Defeat	Macedonia, Thrace and Ionia regain independence from Persia Achaemenid destruction of Athens
Wars of the Delian League (477–449 BC): Athenian expedition to Egypt; Part of Greco-Persian Wars	Persian Empire	Delian League Egyptian rebels led by Inaros II (until 454 BC)	Defeat in Greece Victory in Egypt	Peace of Callias: Persia loses control over Thrace, the Aegean Sea and the western coast of Asia Minor. Complete expulsion of the Achaemenid Empire from Europe; Greek expeditionary force defeated and repelled from Egypt.; Rise of Athenian Empire and the Pentecontaetia
Samian War (440–439 BC)	Samos Supported by: Achaemenid Empire: Satrapy of Lydia	Athens	Defeat	Samian surrenders
Peloponnesian War (431–404 BC)	Peloponnesian League (led by Sparta) Boeotian League (led by Thebes) Delphi Phocis Doris Ambracia Macedon (up until 421 BC) Syracuse Supported by: Achaemenid Empire (since 413 BC): Satrapy of Lydia	Delian League (led by Athens) Thessaly Plataea Argos Acarnania Elis (418 BC) Mantinea (418 BC) Segesta (415–413 BC) Etruscans (415–413 BC)	Victory	Dissolution of the Delian League; Spartan hegemony over Athens and its allies
Pissuthnes' Lydian revolt (420–415 BC)	Achaemenid Empire	Satrapy of Lydia Greek mercenaries	Victory	Revolt suppressed, Tissaphernes becomes the new satrap
Amyrtaeus' Revolt (411–398 BC)	Persian Empire	Egypt lead by Amyrtaeus Supported by: Sparta	Defeat	Coronation of the pharaoh Amyrtaeus in 404, ending the Twenty-seventh Dynasty of Egypt despite Artaxerxes II's efforts to reconquer the region
Cyrus the Younger's Revolt (401 BC): Battle of Cunaxa	Persian Empire: Colchis	Persians loyal to Cyrus the Younger Ten Thousand mercenary force Supported by: Sparta; Asia Minor Greeks	Victory	Artaxerxes II still in full control of the kingdom
Corinthian War (396–387 BC)	Athens; Argos; Corinth; Thebes; Persian Empire; Other allies	Sparta; Peloponnesian League Supported by: Egypt	Victory (Peace of Antalcidas dictated by Iran)	Ionia ceded back to Achaemenid Iran; Boeotian league dissolved; Union of Argos and Corinth dissolved.
Evagoras I's Cyprus Revolt (391–376 BC): Battle of Citium; Hakor of Egypt's war on Persia (385–383 BC)	Persian Empire	Salamis (Cyprus) Supported by: Athens (until 387); Egypt; Salamis; Sparta (380–379)	Victory	Evagoras I recognized the lordship of Persia over Cyprus.
Artaxerxes' II Cadusian Campaign (385 BC)	Persian Empire	Cadusii	Victory	Negotiated peace with rival chiefs
Theban–Spartan War (378–362 BC)	Persian Empire	Sparta and allies Thebes and allies	Victory	Persian king's support of Thebes was secured after the fail of the mediation.: End of Spartan hegemony; Start of Theban hegemony
Persian invasion of Nectanebo's Egypt (374/3–350 BC): Battle of Pelusium (373 BC); Spartan expedition to Egypt (358 BC)	Persian Empire: Greek mercenaries; Kushites	Thirtieth Dynasty of Egypt Supported by: Rebel Satraps; Sparta; Athens; Egyptian Revolters	Defeat	Egyptian pyrrhic victory: Egypt maintains its independence, but becomes politically unstable.; * Teos of Egypt, Nectanebo I's successor, is overthrown by Nectanebo II with Greek aid. Then Nectanebo II waged a war against other claimants for the succession.
Revolt of the Satraps (372–362 BC): Greek intervention	Persian Empire	Rebel satrapies Supported by: Sparta; Athens	Victory	Rebellions crushed
Expansion of Macedonia under Philip II (359–336 BC): Philip II's expedition to Asia Minor	Illyrians Paeonia Phocis Chalkidian League Odrysian kingdom Getae Triballi Scythians Athens Thebes Supported by: Persian Empire	Macedonia	Defeat	Macedonian hegemony over Ancient Greece and establishment of League of Corinth to expel Persians from the region Clashes between Macedonians (lead by Parmenion) and Persians (lead by Memnon of Rhodes) in Anatolia
Phoenician and Cypriot revolt during the reign of Artaxerxes III (351-340 BC): Abdashtart I's Revolt (c. 346 BC)	Persian Empire: Caria	Kingdom of Sidon: Phoenicians; Hellespontine Phrygia Salamis (Cyprus) Supported by: Ancient Greece; Egypt; Ancient Jews	Victory	Revolt suppressed.: Artabazos II is exiled and then pardoned but relocated to Bactria.; Tennes of Sidon is executed and replaced with Evagoras II.; Pnytagoras overthrows Evagoras II in Cyprus and is pardoned.; Idrieus of Caria adds Cyprus to his domains.; Rise of Mentor of Rhodes in the Eastern Mediterranean; Artaxerxes II launches a punitive invasion of Nectanebo II's Egypt.
Second conquest of Egypt (c. 351-340 BC)	Persian Empire Supported by: Ancient Thebes; Ancient Argos	Egypt Supported by: Kingdom of Sidon; Libu tribe; Nubia	Victory	Egypt is conquered for a second time by Iran: Nectanebo II fled to Nubia in 342 BC, trying to resist with Nubian aid until his death.
Khabash Revolt (338 – c.335 BC)	Persian Empire: Satrapy of Egypt; Kingdom of Kush	Egyptian and Nubian rebels	Victory	Revolt suppressed by Persians; Nastasen of Kush expels the Egyptian invaders.
Nidin-Bel'a Revolt (336 – 335 BC)	Persian Empire	Babylon rebels	Victory	Revolt quickly suppressed by Darius III
Macedonian invasion of Persian Empire (334–328 BC): Chronology of the expedition of Alexander the Great into Asia; Part of Wars of Alexander the Great	Persian Empire: Lydia; Cilicia; Phoenicia; Assyria; Eber-Nari; Egypt; Armenia; Babylonia; Uxiians; Bactria; Sogdia; Dahae; Saka; Sparta Ancient Carthage Greek, Arab, Indian and Scythian mercenaries	Macedonia: League of Corinth; Agrianes; Paeonian; Thracian; Gandhara Khwarazm Arachosian, Bactrian, Parapamisadaean, Sogdian, Indian, and Scythian mercenaries	Defeat (Regime change)	Iran conquered by the army of Alexander the Great: Rise of the Pharnavazid dynasty in the Kingdom of Iberia

== Hellenistic era ==
Conflict	Persianizated State (and allies)	Opponents	Results	Notes
Macedonian Empire (330–312 BC)
Indian campaign of Alexander the Great (327–325 BC): Part of Indo-Greek Wars	Macedonia: Hellenic League; Persian Satraps; Gandhara	Ancient India: Pauravas; Aśvaka; Mallians; Guraeans; Oxydracians; Kasmira; Amvastha	Victory	Hellenic conquest of great part of the Indus Valley up to the Beas River Iranic confrontation with the Nanda Empire of Magadha
Nanda–Mauryan War (323–321 BC)	House of Maurya Supported by: Matsya Kingdom; Suryavamshi dynasty of Kalinga; Bahlika; Kirata; Alexander's satraps (Parasika, Kamboja, Saka, and Greek mercenaries)	Nanda Empire	Victory	Fall of the Nanda Empire and establishment of the Maurya Empire with Greco-Persian aid
Chandragupta's conquest of North-western India (322-317 BCE): Part of Indo-Greek Wars	Alexander's satraps and their states: Nicanor; Philip	Magadha: Maurya dynasty	Defeat	Mauryan conquest of Greek satrapies, annexation of former Persian domains at North-western India
Wars of the Diadochi (322–281 BC)	First War: Antipatrid dynasty; Antigonid dynasty; Ptolemaic dynasty; Second War: Antigonid dynasty; Antipatrid dynasty; Ptolemaic dynasty; Thrace; Third War: Antigonid dynasty; Polyperchon	First War: Perdiccas's faction; Second War: Polyperchon's faction; Epirus; Third War: Ptolemaic Egypt; Antipatrid Macedonia; Thrace; Caria	Defeat	Death of Perdiccas Seleucus established himself in Babylon in 312 BC, then conquest Persia.
Seleucid Empire (312-129 BC)
Babylonian War (311–309 BCE)	Seleucid Empire	Antigonid dynasty	Victory	Seleucid control of Babylonia, Media, and Elam
Seleucid–Mauryan war (305–303 BCE): Part of Indo-Greek Wars	Seleucid Empire	Maurya Empire	Defeat	Treaty of the Indus: Seleucid Empire's eastern Persian satrapies ceded to Mauryan Empire: Gandhara, Paropamisadae, eastern part of Gedrosia, possibly also Arachosia and Aria up to modern-day Herat.; Seleucus gives the hand of his daughter to Chandragupta, founding a dynastic alliance.
Seleucid campaigns in Central Asia against nomads (292–240s BC)	Seleucid Empire Sarmatians	Scytho-Siberian world: Dahae Confederation; Saka/Massagetae; Scythia	Victory	Antiochus I Soter restores damage and rebuilds cities. Then Demodamas drives them from Bactria and Sogdiana, even making a punitive expedition into Syr Darya until reaching peace.: However, the Parni (member of the Dahae) continues the raids, leading to the foundation of the Parthian Empire, which later contributed to the loss of territory and the rise of the Greco-Bactrian kingdom.; The Sarmatians, pressured by Dahae and Saka raids, began crossing the Don river and invaded European Scythia in the Black Sea, establishing Sarmatia at the Pontic–Caspian steppe.
First Parni invasion of Margiana (280 BC)	Seleucid Empire	Dahae: Parni	Victory	The military capabilities of the Parni are weakened.
Second Parni invasion of Margiana (248–246 BC)	Seleucid Empire	Dahae: Parni	Victory	Parni are briefly neutralized.
Seleucus II' Iranian Campaign (245–235 BC): Andragoras revolt in Hyrcani; Arsacid-Parni conquest of Parthia; Greco-Bactrian Revolt by Didotus I	Seleucid Empire	Upper Satrapies: Parthia-Hyrcania led by Andragoras; Bactria led by Diodotids; Arsacid Parni	Defeat	Separatist victory and Parni intervention: Arsacids' rise to power, conquering Arsaces I the Andragoras' Parthian Kingdom, establishing the Parthian Empire and starting the Seleucid–Parthian Wars.; Greco-Bactrian Kingdom of Diodotus I is consolidated as an independent power by 235.
Seleucid expedition to recover the East (228 BC): Part of Seleucid–Parthian Wars	Seleucid Empire	Parthian Empire Massagetae Greco-Bactrian Kingdom	Stalemate	Arsaces I of Parthia quickly concluded a peace treaty with Diodotus II of Bactria to avoid both powers to have a Two-front war and contain the Seleucid attempts of reconquest. Then Arsaces seek refugee in Central Asia until Seleucus II was forced to leave Parthia, which gave Arsaces the opportunity to regain his lost territories, while cutting off any border between Greco-Bactrians and Seleucids.
Greco-Bactrian Civil War (225): Siege of Ai-Khanoum; Part of Seleucid–Parthian Wars	Greco-Bactrian Kingdom loyal to Euthydemus I Supported by: Seleucid Empire	Greco-Bactrian Kingdom loyal to Diodotus II Supported by: Parthian Empire	Victory	Fall of the Diodotid dynasty, but tensions arise between Greco-Bactrians against the Seleucids' attempts to restore vassalage.
Syrian Wars (217–145 BC): Battle of Raphia; Battle of Panium; Battle of the Oenoparus	Antigonid Macedonia Seleucid Empire: Carmanians; Medes; Cadusii; Persians; Cardaces; Upper Satrapies; Dahae; Arabs	Ptolemaic Egypt Libyans Gauls	Stalemate	Coele-Syria intermittently changes of sovereign.
Antiochus III's Eastern Campaign (212–205 BCE): Battle of Mount Labus; Siege of Syrinx; Battle of the Arius; Siege of Bactra; Part of Seleucid–Parthian Wars	Seleucid Empire: Carmania	Kingdom of Sophene; Greco-Bactrian Kingdom; Parthian Empire; Maurya Empire; Eastern Arabs	Victory	Pirric Victory: Euthydemus I is recognised as King of Greco-Bactrians (but as a Seleucid vassal), consolidating the Euthydemid dynasty.; Arsaces II of Parthia is subordinated and its domains enters in feudatory status, but Seleucids troops leaves Parthia.; Gedrosia is reconquered from the Mauryans, leaving Arachosia to Mauryans (led by Sophagasenus) as a Seleucid protectorate.; Zariadres of Sophene is forced to become ally of Antiochus III the Great, vassalizing Armenia (region).; Seleucids invaded Bahrain and force them to pay tribute.; The reconquered territory are shortly after disocuppied due to logistic problems, leaving them semi-independent.
Roman–Seleucid War (192–188 BC)	Seleucid Empire Supported by: Aetolian League; Galatians; Athamania; Cappadocia; Elis; Co-belligerent: Messene	Roman Republic Supported by: Achaean League; Pergamon; Rhodes; Macedon; Thessalian League; Beotian League; Acarnanian League; Issa; Kos; Erythrai; Athens; Carthage; Numidia	Defeat	Peace of Apamea
Campaigns of Artaxias I (189–165 BCE)	Seleucid Empire Atropatene; Kingdom of Cataonia; Kingdom of Pontus Lesser Armenia Kingdom of Iberia	Kingdom of Armenia Kingdom of Sophene	Defeat	The regions of Caspiana, Faunitida, Basolropeda, Tmorik, Karenitis, Derksen, Akilisene and Antitaurus are annexed to Armenia.
Maccabean Revolt (167–141 BCE)	Seleucid Empire	Maccabees	Defeat	Formation of Hasmonean Judea
Timarchus' Rebellion (163–160 BC)	Seleucid Empire	Kingdom of Media	Victory	The separatist revolt is crushed by Demetrius I.
Parthian conquest of Media (148–147 BC): Part of Seleucid–Parthian Wars and Seleucid Dynastic Wars	Seleucid Empire: Media; Atropatene	Parthian Empire	Defeat	Mithridates I of Parthia conquers the region and appointed his brother Bagasis as the governor.
Parthian conquest of Western Iran (144–138 BC): Part of Seleucid–Parthian Wars and Seleucid Dynastic Wars	Seleucid Empire: Persis; Elam; Babylonia; Supported by: Greco-Bactrian Kingdom; Indo-Greek Kingdom; Saka	Parthian Empire: Parthia; Aria; Margiana; West Bactria; Media; Atropatene	Defeat	Mithridates I of Parthia conquers Susa, Elymais and Mesopotamia, being virtually expelled the Seleucid dynasty from Iran and reduced to rule on Syria until their collapse.
Indo-Greek Kingdoms in Eastern Iran (180–120 BC)
Shunga–Greek War (190/180s–113 BCE): Part of Indo-Greek Wars	Greco-Bactrian Kingdom: Indo-Greek Kingdom	Shunga Empire	Stalemate	Greco-Bactrian Kingdom under Demetrius I reconquers Eastern Iranian Lands (the province of Arachosia) and the Kabul Valley (the province of Paropamisadae) that have been lost by the Seleucid Empire to Ancient India's empires (Nandas, Mauryas, Shungas).: Establishment of the Indo-Greek Kingdom in the northwestern Indian Subcontinent by 175 BC, conquering territory at Sakala, Mathura, Panchala, Saketa (Ayodhya), and potentially Pataliputra under Menander I.
Eucratides I's coup in Bactria (171 BC)	Greco-Bactrian Kingdom loyal to Eucratides I Supported by: Seleucid Empire	Greco-Bactrian Kingdom loyal to Demetrius I of Bactria Supported by: Indo-Greek Kingdom	Victory	Eucratides I comes to power by overthrowing the Euthydemid dynasty in Bactria.
Arians' Rebellion (171–170 BC): First Parthian invasion of Bactria	Greco-Bactrian Kingdom	Arians Rebels Supported by: Parthian Empire	Stalemate	Parthians conquers Tapuria and Margiana, but Greeks expels them from Bactria and Aria.
Siege of Eucratideia (168 BCE)	Greco-Bactrian Kingdom	Indo-Greek Kingdom	Indecisive	Eucratides I flees into India.
First Parthian–Bactrian War (163–155 BC)	Greco-Bactrian Kingdom	Parthian Empire Indo-Greek Kingdom: Euthydemid partisans; Co-belligerent: Sogdians; Arachotes; Dranges; Arians; Shunga Empire	Victory	Parthian conquest of Northern Iran: Mithridates I gained Bactria's territory west of the Arius, the regions of Tapuria and Traxiane.
Second Parthian–Bactrian War (150 BC)	Greco-Bactrian Kingdom	Parthian Empire	Victory	Parthian conquest of North-Eastern Iran: Aria, Margiana and Western Bactria are annexed to the Parthian Empire.; Greek debilitation and rise of the Kushan Empire in the zone
Third Parthian–Bactrian War (141–136 BC).	Greco-Bactrian Kingdom Supported by: Seleucid Empire	Parthian Empire	Stalemate	Mithridates I occupy territory between the Indus and the Hydaspes, but the Kingdom was weakened by 136 and Heliocles I regained the territories with Seleucid help.

== Parthian Empire ==
Conflict	Persia (and allies)	Opponents	Results	Notes
Parthian Empire (247 BC–224 AD)
Parni Conquest of Parthia (238 BC)	Parthian Empire	Kingdom of Parthia Seleucid Empire	Victory	• Rise of the Parthian Empire • The beginning of the Seleucid–Parthian Wars
Parni Conquest of Hyrcania (238 BC)	Parthian Empire	Andragoras' Hyrcania	Victory	The remnant independent domains of Andragoras (former Seleucid satrap) in Hyrcania are conquered by the Arsacids, dominating Eastern Iran.
Seleucid–Parthian Wars (238 BC–129 BC): Seleucid expedition to recover the East; Antiochus III's Eastern Campaign; Priapatius' reconquest of the lands lost to the Seleucids; Parthian–Bactrian Wars; Mithridates I's conquest of Persia and Babylonia; Battle of Ecbatana	Parthian Empire: Parni	Seleucid Empire Persis Elymais Characene Scythians Arabs Greco-Bactrian Kingdom	Victory	• Expulsion of the Seleucids from Iran, ending Hellenistic period there
Parthian-Mardian War (164–165 BC)	Parthian Empire	Mardians Seleucid Empire	Victory	Parthians conquers the Alborz mountains in Northern Iran, absorving the remnants of Seleucid Hyrcania and bordering Media.: Mardians are deported to Charax to protect the Caspian Gates.; Tapurians are deported to protect the Caspian coast in modern Tabaristan.
Sacaraucae–Massagetae invasion of Persia and India (between c. 155 BCE and c. 124 BCE): Part of Saka southern migrations	Parthian Empire Co-belligerent: Ancient india; Greco-Bactrian Kingdom; Indo-Greek Kingdom	Indo-Scythian Kingdom: Saka; Massagetae; Pahlavas; Kambojas; Asioi; Tocharians: Yuezhi	Defeat	The Yuezhi nomads (escaping from the Xiongnu-Wusun conquest of their homeland in Northwest China on 155 BC) expels the Scythian and Indo-Aryan nomads of their Central Asia lands at the Ili River region, forcing them to flight into Ferghana and Sogdiana and then clashing with Persians at Bactria and Parthia.; The Nomad invaders conquers the Indo-Greek states (falling the Greco-Bactrian realm) and kills the Parthian kings (Phraates II and Artabanus I), forcing Parthians to pay them tribute and conquering the satrapy of Drangiana (modern Afghanistan and Balochistan) to settle there and founding the Indo-Scythian Kingdom with Sigal, Sakastan as their capital, taking control of the region between Helmand and Sistan by 150 BC.; The Indo-Scythians continues their campaign into the Indian subcontinent, vassalizing Sovira, Gujarat, Rajasthan, Gandhara and north India by 124 BC, increasing their sphere of influence on other kingdoms of South Asia during the reign of Maues.
Battle of Ecbatana (129 BC)	Parthian Empire	Seleucid Empire	Victory	End of Hellenistic rule in Iran
Saka invasion of Drangiana (128–115 BC)	Parthian Empire	Indo-Scythians: Saka; Tocharians: Yuezhi	Victory	Parthian expels the Indo-Scythian invaders and reconquers Eastern Iran and western Bactria and expands into Amu Darya, Arachosia and Punjab, extending Parthian suzerainty to the borders of the Indus Valley, appointing Cheiroukes and Tanlis Mardates as satraps.: The House of Suren gets the Indo-Parthian territories as a reward for their military contribution and in compensation for the losses of their Governoship of Drangiana (as the Parthians recognised their cession of the Sistan territory to the Indo-Scythian Kingdom, who conquered it in the previous invasion).
Hyspaosines Rebellion (127–124 BC)	Parthian Empire	Characene	Stalemate	Hyspaosines maintains his governoship as a Parthian vassal, briefly controlling Mesopotamia and Babylonia.
Parthian invasion of Armenia (120–100 BCE?)	Parthian Empire Atropatene	Kingdom of Armenia	Victory	Parthians add territories
Parthian expedition to Arabia (119 BC)	Parthian Empire	Ancient Arabs	Victory	End of Arab raids on Babylonia
Mithridates II's war with the Seleucids. (112-109 BC)	Parthian Empire Characene	Seleucid Empire Elymais	Victory	Parthian conquers Mesopotamia and reduce Seleucids into Syria
Chinese–Parthian War (104–102 BC): Related to War of the Heavenly Horses	Parthian Empire	Han China	Stalemate	Emperor Wu of Han forced Mithridates II of Parthia to start commercial relations and the sell of Persian horse, but Parthians maintain its sphere of influence on Fergana Valley.
Parthian Expansion into India (92–10 BC): Vonones of Sakastan's clashes with Maues' Indo-Scythia; Gondophares conquest on the East	Parthian Empire: Sakastan; Indo-Parthian Kingdom; Apracharajas	Indo-Scythian Kingdom: Northern Satraps; Western Satraps; Indo-Greek Kingdom	Victory	The House of Suren conquers Arachosia, Seistan, Sindh, Punjab, and the Kabul valley (overthrowing Indo-Scythian rulers such as Azes II and instigating the collapse of Scythian empires), integrating local Greco-Buddhist elements into Parthian governance. Then, with the accumulated territory and power, the Indo-Parthian kingdom at Taxila proclaims its independence from Persia around 20 AD.; Fall of the Indo-Greek Kingdom by the pressure from Parthians and Indo-Scythians (the latter conquering the remnants of their dominions)
Armenian–Parthian War (87–85 BC): Part of Military campaigns of Tigranes the Great	Parthian Empire	Kingdom of Armenia	Defeat	Osroene and Atrpatakan loyalty to Tigranes the Great
Battle of Carrahe (53 BC)	Parthian Empire	Roman Republic	Victory	• Repelling the danger of the Romans • Crassus killed • Roman desire to retaliate for Julius Caesar's planned invasion of the Parthian Empire
Liberators' civil war (43–42 BC): Battle of Philippi	Liberatores Supported by: Parthian Empire	Second Triumvirate Supported by: Ptolemaic Egypt	Defeat	The Second Triumvirate wins the Roman Civil War, then reinstates control over the eastern provinces.
Pompeian–Parthian invasion of 40 BC (40–38 BC): Battle of the Cilician Gates; Battle of Amanus Pass; Battle of Mount Gindarus	Parthian Empire	Roman Republic	Defeat	Status quo ante bellum: Parthian conquests in Asia Minor and Levant are repelled
Antony's Parthian War (36–20 BC)	Parthian Empire Atropatene Hasmonean Kingdom	Roman Republic Kingdom of Armenia Galatia Cappadocia Pontus Herodian Kingdom of Judea	Victory	• Antony's was unsuccessful in campaign against Iran • Ended by formal peace in 20 BC
Pharasmanes I of Iberia invasion of Armenia (35 AD)	Parthian Empire Kingdom of Armenia	Kingdom of Iberia	Defeat	Orodes of Armenia is deposed
Taxila's Revolt against Phraortes (40s BC)	Indo-Parthian Kingdom Apracharajas	Nobles from Taxila	Victory	According to Apollonius of Tyana, the population from Taxila aided Phraortes (who was also aided by Sases of Indo-Parthia and Ghandara) to restore his kingship against the usurpers.
First Parthian-Kushan War (45–50s AD): Kushan invasion of Indo-Parthia	Parthian Empire: Indo-Parthian Kingdom	Kushan Empire: Yuezhi	Defeat	Kushans conquer Indo-Parthian territories in northern India.
Iberian–Armenian War (50–51 AD/51–53 AD)	Kingdom of Armenia Roman Empire (until 51) Kingdom of Armenia Parthian Empire	Kingdom of Iberia Kingdom of Iberia Roman Empire	Victory	The Roman–Parthian War of 58–63 start
Roman–Parthian War of 58–63 (58–63 AD)	Parthian Empire Kingdom of Armenia	Roman Empire Roman clients • Sophene • Lesser Armenia • Iberia • Commagene • Pontus	Stalemate	Treaty of Rhandeia: Minor territorial gains for Roman clients; Parthians establish the Arsacid dynasty of Armenia
Roman–Parthian Wars (66 AD–216)	Parthian Empire; Kingdom of Armenia	Roman Empire; Pontus	Status quo ante bellum	Borders changed several times.
Alan invasion of Parthia (72 AD)	Parthian Empire; Kingdom of Armenia; Media Atropatene	Alans	Defeat	Vologases I of Parthia could not avoid the Alanian plundering of Armenia, Media and Atropatene.
Trajan's Parthian campaign (115–117)	Parthian Empire co-belligerent: Jewish/Judean zealots Babylonian rebels Armenian rebels	Roman Empire Client Parthian state	Stalemate	Rome gains Parthian territories on the East, but evacuates the Mesopotamia province and Roman Armenia due to revolts.; Osroes I defeat Roman client Parthamaspates
Alan raids of 135	Caucasian Albania; Roman Empire Atropatene; Parthian Empire	Alans; Kingdom of Iberia	Defeat	Vologases III of Parthia could not avoid the Alanian plundering of Atropatene and had to buy off invaders to avoid plundering of Armenia
Kanishka's Central Asian campaign (2nd century): Kanishka's conquest of Greater Bactria; Kanishka's war with Parthia (130–140)	Greco-Bactrian Kingdom Indo-Scythians Parthian Empire Supported by: Han China: Protectorate of the West	Kushan Empire: Gandhara	Defeat	Greater Bactria, Kashghar, Yarqand, and Khotan annexed to the Kushan Empire, which seized the control of the Silk road trade and also contributed in the Spread of Buddhism and later Hinduism into Central Asia.: Parthian loses the eastern lands of Greater Iran.; Han withdrawal from Central Asia, leading to the fall of the first Protectorate of the Western Regions; Decline of remaining Greco-Bactrian and Indo-Scythian powers, and the Indo-Parthian kingdom
Second Parthian-Kushan War (between c. 130 CE to c. 140 CE)	Parthian Empire: Indo-Parthian kingdom	Kushan Empire	Defeat	Kanishka I repels the invasion
Roman–Parthian War of 161–166 (161–166)	Parthian Empire Pro-Parthian Edessans	Roman Empire Pro-Roman Edessans	Defeat	Minor Roman territorial gains and Armenia consolidated as a Roman client
Battle of Ctesiphon (198)	Parthian Empire	Roman Empire	Defeat	Roman sacks Persian capital
Parthian War of Caracalla (216–217)	Parthian Empire	Roman Empire	Victory	Rome is forced to pay tribute to Parthia

== Sasanian Empire ==
Conflict	Persia (and allies)	Opponents	Results	Notes
Sassanid Empire (224–651)
Battle of Hormozdgan (224)	Sassanids	Parthian Empire	Victory (Regime change)	• Fall of the Parthian Empire • Rise of the Sasanian Empire
Sasanian conquest of Sakastan (225–226)	Sassanids	Indo-Parthian Kingdom	Victory	Consolidation of the Sasanian Empire on eastern Persia
Sasanian–Kushan Wars (226–358)	Sasanian Empire: Sakastan; Turan; Hind; Kushano-Sasanian Kingdom	Kushan Empire	Victory	First: Ardashir I in 226 re-conquered the provinces of Sakastan, Gorgan, Khorasan, Marw, Balkh and Chorasmia from the Kushans (who conquered previously to the Parthians).; Second: Shapur I in 242 turned Kushans into tributary, who lost control their Northwestern provinces at Peshawar and Hindu Kush, becoming Kushans restricted to Northern India, eventually being subjugated by the Gupta Empire.; Third: Shapur II in 358 conquered Kushanite territories beyond the Indus River as a punishment for Kushans allying with the Chionites in their invasion of the Kushano-Sasanian Kingdom.
Ardashir I invasion of Armenia (226–238): Part of Armeno–Sassanid Conflicts	Sasanian Empire	Kingdom of Armenia	Defeat	Sassanid withdrawal
First Mesopotamian campaign of Ardashir I (229–233): Sassanid campaign of Severus Alexander	Sasanian Empire	Roman Empire Kingdom of Hatra	Inconclusive	Both sides gain territory.
Second Mesopotamian campaign of Ardashir I (237–240): Siege of Nisibis (237); Fall of Hatra	Sasanian Empire	Roman Empire Kingdom of Hatra	Victory	The Sasanian Empire conquers several cities including Nisibis (237), Carrhae (238) and Hatra (240).
Shapur I campaign on the East (241–242): part of Sasanian–Kushan Wars	Sasanian Empire: Indo-Sasanians	Western Kushan Empire; Saka; Gilaks	Victory	Persia annexes territories as far as "Purushapura" (Peshawar) and the Hindu-Kush or even south of it, includying Sogdiana, Bactria, and Gandhara. Kushans are deposed and replaced by the Kushanshah
Sasanian campaign of Gordian III (242–244): Battle of Resaena; Battle of Misiche	Sasanian Empire	Roman Empire Germanic and Goth allies	Victory	The Sasanian Empire conquers Armenia and Mesopotamia
Mariades' Revolt (252/259)	Antioch rebels Sasanian Empire	Roman Empire	Victory	Persian intervention in the Crisis of the Third Century.
Siege of Nisibis (252)	Sasanian Empire	Roman Empire	Victory	Persian capture of Nisibis
Battle Of Barbalissos (253)	Sasanian Empire	Roman Empire	Victory	Shapur's army won against Valerian's army
Siege of Antioch (253)	Sasanian Empire	Roman Empire	Victory	Persian capture of Antioch
Siege of Dura-Europos (256)	Sasanian Empire	Roman Empire	Victory	Persian capture of Dura-Europos
Battle of Edessa (260): part of Crisis of the Third Century	Sasanian Empire	Roman Empire: Roman Syria; Germanic and Goth allies	Victory	Roman Emperor Valerian was captured.; Fulvius Macrianus his sons (Quietus and Macrianus Minor) as joint emperors in opposition to Valerian's son Gallienus.; Odaenathus declares himself King of Palmyra and start the process for the independence of its Kingdom.; Persian raids Cilicia and Cappadocia.
Siege of Antioch (260)	Sasanian Empire	Roman Empire	Victory	Sasanian Empire conquers Antioch
Siege of Caesarea Cappadocia (260): part of Crisis of the Third Century	Sasanian Empire	Roman Empire	Victory	Sasanian Empire conquers Caesarea Cappadocia
Odaenathus' Sasanian Campaign (261–266): Battle of Ctesiphon (263)	Sasanian Empire	Roman Empire Palmyrene Kingdom	Defeat	The Sasanians lost all the territories they had gained in the Battle of Edessa
Sasanian revolts against Barham II (274–293)	Sasanian Empire	Kushano-Sasanian Kingdom; Sakastan; Khuzistan Mobads; Supported by: Gilaks; Kushans	Victory	Revolts suppressed: Hormizd I Kushanshah adopts the title "Great Kushan King of Kings" and maintains its claims as Shahanshah of all Sasanian Domains despite its defeat.; Execution of Hormizd of Sakastan
Carus' Sasanian Campaign (283)	Sasanian Empire	Roman Empire	Victory	Withdrawal of Roman forces
Narseh's insurrection (293)	Sasanian Empire Zoroastrians	Narseh's forces Manichaeists	Narseh's Victory	Bahram III is deposed, Kartir reforms are abolished, Zoroastrian theocracy ends and Sasanian empire is centralised.
Galerius' Sasanian campaigns (296–298): Battle of Carrhae (296); Battle of Voskha (298); Battle of Satala (298); Part of Armeno–Sassanid Conflicts	Sasanian Empire	Roman Empire Kingdom of Armenia	Defeat	Persian invasion of Mesopotamia and Armenia success. Then Roman expels Persians from Armenia, capture Narseh's wife, raid Ctesiphon and gains territory on the Peace of Nisibis (299).
Shapur ll's Arab Campaign (325)	Sasanian Empire	Arabs: Iyad; Taghlib; Banu Bakr; Banu Abdul Qays; Banu Tamim; Banu Hanzalah	Victory	The Sasanian Empire establishes suzerainty over all of the Persian Gulf and numerous factions in Arabia; Wall of the Arabs was constructed to prevent raids by the Arabs
Perso-Roman wars of 337–361 (337–361): Battle of Narasara (337); Battle of Arest (337); Part of Armeno–Sassanid Conflicts	Sasanian Empire Xionites/Kidarites	Roman Empire	Indecisive	Status quo ante bellum
Wars of Shapur II with the Chionites and Kushans (350–358): part of Sasanian–Kushan Wars and Sasanian–Kidarite wars	Sasanian Empire: Hind province; Kushano-Sasanian Kingdom; Gupta Empire	Xionites/Kidarites Kushan Empire Kshatrapas	Victory	Expansion of Sasanian control to the south-east, beyond the Indus River; Nomads, led by the chief Grumbates, are forced to serve as mercenaries in the Persian army against the Romans.; Collapse of surrounding Indo-Scythian states such as the Paratarajas and the Western Satraps
Shapur II's invasion of Kushano Sasanian Kingdom (around 350 CE)	Sasanian Empire: Hind province	Kushano-Sasanian Kingdom	Victory	The Sasanian Persians took control of large territories in the south of the Kushano-Sasanian Kingdom (Gandhara and Punjab in modern Balochistan and Pashtunistan) as a punishment for their attempts to become an independent state, and to have more secure borders in Eastern Iran against the Nomadic empires. The Kushano-Sasanians' domains remained only in Tukharistan at the north.
Sasanian–Kidarite wars (350–466): Sasanian campaigns in Central Asia	Sasanian Empire: Kushano-Sasanian Kingdom; Alchon Huns Hepthalites	Kidarites	Victory	Expansion of Sasanian control to the north-east, re-occupying Bactria and going further to Transoxiana; Start of Gupta–Kidarite conflict, as Kidarites were pushed to North India
Shapur II's invasion of Armenia (350): Battle of Voshka; Part of Armeno–Sassanid Conflicts	Sasanian Empire Caucasian Albania	Kingdom of Armenia Roman Empire	Defeat	Rise of Arshak II
Shapur II's Armenian campaign (359–361): Part of Armeno–Sassanid Conflicts	Sasanian Empire	Kingdom of Armenia Roman Empire	Victory	Death of Arshak II
Kidarites invasions of Bactria (360s)	Sasanian Empire: Kushano-Sasanian Kingdom	Kidarites	Defeat	Kidara I conquers Bactria and get the title of Kushanshah
Julian's Persian expedition (363)	Sasanian Empire Arab allies	Roman Empire Kingdom of Armenia	Victory	Sasanian annexation of 5 regions & 15 major fortresses from the Roman Empire in addition to the consequent annexation of Armenia
Armeno-Sassanid War of 363–371: Shapur II's 2nd Armenian campaign (367–371); Battle of Bagavan; Part of Armeno–Sassanid Conflicts	Sasanian Empire Caucasian Albania	Roman Empire Kingdom of Armenia	Defeat	Persians depose Arshak II of Armenia. Then Armenia is under Roman suzerainty through Pap of Armenia entronization.
Shapur III's Armenian Campaign (378–386): Part of Armeno–Sassanid Conflicts	Sasanian Empire	Kingdom of Armenia Eastern Roman Empire	Victory	Peace of Acilisene: Roman and Persian partition of Armenia; Eastern Persarmenia of Khosrov IV of Armenia is given to the Sassanids; Western Armenia of Arshak III is given to the Romans.; Both empires agreed to protect the Caucasus from nomad invasions.
Alchon Hun-Sasanian conflicts in Central Asia (370–388): Hunnic conquest of Bactria (370); Hunnic conquest of Kabulistan (385–388)	Sasanian Empire: Kabulistan; co-belligerent Ancient india	Alchon Huns Kidarites at Gandhara	Defeat	Hunnic conquest of modern Afghanistan in their major invasion of South Asia
Hunnic invasion of the Sasanian Empire (395)	Sasanian Empire co-belligerent Roman Empire	Hunnic Empire	Victory	Huns quit
Roman–Sasanian War of 421–422 (421–422)	Sasanian Empire Lakhmid Arabs	Eastern Roman Empire	Inconclusive	Status quo ante bellum: Zoroastrianism is tolerated by Romans and Christianism by Persians.; Both empires agreed to fight against south nomads (Arabs).
Byzantine–Sasanian War of 440 (440)	Sasanian Empire	Eastern Roman Empire	Indecisive	Status quo ante bellum: Both empires agreed to battle northern nomads (Scythians and Vandals).
Vardan's War (449–451): Siege of Aang Castle; Battle of Khaghkhagh; Battle of Avarayr; Part of Armeno–Sassanid Conflicts	Sasanian Empire Pro-Sasanian Armenians	Christian Armenians	Victory	Following Persian the victory, Yazdegerd jailed some Armenian priests and nobles and appointed a new governor for Armenia but, the Armenians gained religious freedom for their Christian faith.
Sassanian War of Succession (457–459)	Loyals to Hormizd III	Loyals to Peroz I	Peroz Victory	Peroz deposes his older brother
Albanian's Revolt (457–459)	Sasanian Empire: Caucasian Albania (pro-Persia); Zoroastrians	Caucasian Albania (independentists): Church of Caucasian Albania; Hunnic Empire	Defeat	Vache II of Albania, of the Arsacid dynasty of Caucasian Albania establishes an independent kingdom.
Kidarite-Sassanid War (464–466)	Sasanian Empire Alchon Huns	Kidarites	Victory	End of Kidarite menace to Persia in Bactria
Vahan's War (481–484): Part of Armeno–Sassanid Conflicts	Sasanian Empire: Zoroastrians	Sasanian Armenia: Armenian Christians; co-belligerent: Hephthalite Empire	Defeat	Treaty of Nvarsak: Religious freedoom for Christians in Armenia is
Hephthalite–Sasanian Wars (484–565): Hephthalite–Sasanian War of 484; Sukhra's Hephthalite campaign; Battle of Gol-Zarriun (Part of Wars of Khosrow I)	Sasanian Empire: Kushano-Sasanian Kingdom; First Turkic Khaganate	Hephthalite Empire	Victory	The Hephthalite Empire breaks into minor kingdoms.; Sasanians and Turks established a frontier for their zones of influence along the Oxus river
Byzantine–Sassanid Wars (502–628)	Sasanian Empire	Byzantine Empire	Status quo ante bellum	Borders changed several times.
Anastasian War (502–506)	Sasanian Empire	Byzantine Empire	Draw	Status quo ante bellum •Byzantium pays a small amount of money
Aksumite invasion of Himyar (518–525)	Himyarite Kingdom: Jewish Himyarites; Supported by: Sasanian Empire	Kingdom of Aksum: South Arabian Christians; Supported by: • Byzantine Empire	Defeat	Aksumite victory and conquest of Yemen; End of persecution of Christians by Jewish Himyarites; Byzantines establish an anti-Sasanid bloc in Arabia Felix
Iberian War (526–532): Part of Wars of Khosrow I	Sasanian Empire Lakhmids Sabirs	Byzantine Empire Iberia Ghassanids Huns Heruli Aksumites Kinda	Inconclusive	*Sasanians retained Iberia Byzantines retained Lazica: Treaty of Eternal Peace; Byzantines
Lazic War (541–562): Belisarius' invasion of Mesopotamia in 541; Mihr-Mihroe's campaign of 554; Part of Wars of Khosrow I	Sasanian Empire	Byzantine Empire Goths Ghassanids	Disputed	Fifty-Year Peace Treaty
Aksumite–Persian wars (570–578): Battle of Hadhramaut; Siege of Sanaa (570); Sasanian reconquest of Yemen; Part of Wars of Khosrow I	Sasanian Empire: Himyarite Kingdom; Supported by: Jewish Himyarites	Kingdom of Aksum: Aksum Yemen; Supported by: Byzantine Empire South Arabian Christians	Victory	Ethiopians are expelled from the Himyarite Kingdom. (Yemen is annexed by the Sasanian Empire)
Armenian Revolt of 571–572: Part of Armeno–Sassanid Conflicts	Sasanian Empire	Mamikonian Armenian Christians	Defeat	Start of War for the Caucasus and end of Persian attempts to assimilate Armenians
War for the Caucasus (572–591): Part of Wars of Khosrow I	Sasanian Empire Lakhmids	Byzantine Empire Ghassanids Mamikonians Huns	Defeat	• Khosrow II is restored to the Sasanian throne. • Khosrow II gives the Byzantine Empire most of Persian Armenia and western half of Iberia after the Sasanian civil war of 589–591 • Byzantium stops paying tribute to Sasanian empire
First Perso-Turkic War (588–589)	Sasanian Empire	Hephthalite Empire; Göktürks	Victory	The Sassanids captured Balkh.
Sasanian civil war of 589–591: Part of War for the Caucasus	Sasanian Empire	Supporters of Bahram Chobin Dissatisfied Sasanian nobles supported by: Byzantine Empire	Khosrow II Victory	Khosrow II faction's victory
Vistahm Rebellion (590–596)	Sasanian Empire	Parthians led by Vistahm	Victory	Revolt suppressed
Byzantine–Sasanian War of 602–628: Sasanian invasion of Armenia; Sasanian conquest of Jerusalem; Shahin's invasion of Asia Minor; Sasanian conquest of Egypt; Heraclius' Anatolian campaign; Heraclius Caucasus campaign	Sasanian Empire: Lakhmids; Sasanian Iberia; Asoristan; Sasanian Egypt; Avars (and Slavic allies)	Byzantine Empire: Ghassanids; Roman Egypt; Western Turkic Khaganate	Defeat	The Sasanians agree to withdraw from all occupied territories and return the "True Cross".; Iranian invasion of the Byzantine Empire repelled after initial successes in conquering the Levant, Egypt, and much of Anatolia.; Beginning of the Sasanian civil war of 628–632
War of the Camel's Udder (604–611)	Sasanian Empire: Lakhmid kingdom	Pre-Islamic Arabia: Banu Bakr; Banu Ijl; Banu Yashkur; Banu Dhuhl; Banu Qays; Banu Taym ibn Tha'labah; Abd al-Qays; Banu Tamim	Defeat	Sasanian rule briefly interrupted until restored by Ruzbi, the frontier governor (marzban) of al-Hira.
Second Perso-Turkic War (614–616)	Sasanian Empire: Persarmenia	Western Turkic Khaganate; Hephthalite Empire	Victory	Smbat IV Bagratuni successfully defend Sasanian Central Asia from the Turkic invasion.
Jewish revolt against Heraclius (614–617/625): Part of Byzantine–Sasanian War of 602–628	Jewish rebels Sasanian Empire	Byzantine Empire	Status quo ante bellum	Jewish surrender and expulsion after a brief rule by Persians and Jews over parts of the Byzantine Diocese of the East.
Sasanian incursions into Nubia (620s)	Sasanian Empire: Sasanian Egypt; Kingdom of Makuria	Kingdom of Nobatia Byzantine Empire: Roman Egypt	Inconclusive	Persians are expelled by Byzantines, but Persian incursions destroy Christian Churches and debilitate Nobatians, causing its decline and further conquest by simultaneous Makurian invasion.
Third Perso-Turkic War (627–629): Part of Byzantine–Sasanian War of 602–628	Sasanian Empire: Principality of Iberia; Supported by: Eastern Turkic Khaganate	Western Turkic Khaganate; Supported by: • Byzantine Empire	Defeat	Byzantine control of Georgia
Sasanian civil war of 628–632: Part of Sasanian revolts and civil wars	The Parsig faction The Nimruzi faction	The Pahlav (Parthian) faction Shahrbaraz's army	Stalemate	Yazdegerd III is recognized as king of Iran.; Weakening of the Sasanian Empire; The governors of the provinces of Mazun and Yemen gain independence (disintegration of Sasanian rule in the Arabian peninsula).
Muslim conquest of Persia (633–654): Arab conquest of Mesopotamia; Muslim conquest of Khuzestan; Arab conquest of Fars; Muslim conquest of Khorasan; Muslim conquest of Sistan; Muslim conquest of Kerman; Muslim conquest of Northern Persia; Part of Early Muslim conquests and Military conquests of Umar's era	Sasanian Empire: Caucasian Albania; Sasanian Armenia; Arab Christians; Supported by: Byzantine Empire; Principality of Iberia; Principality of Chaghaniyan; Rai dynasty; Hephthalites; Nezak Huns; Göktürks	Rashidun Caliphate Kanarang	Defeat (Regime change)	Fall of the Sassanid Empire; Iran is added to the Caliphate; Then Muslim conquests of Afghanistan, Muslim invasion of India, Muslim conquest of Azerbaijan, Muslim conquest of Armenia and Arab–Khazar wars
Sasanids attempts to recuperate the Persian throne (657–729)	Tang China: Persia Governorate; Protectorate General to Pacify the West; Sassanids in exile	Rashidun Caliphate (until 661) Umayyad Caliphate (from 661) • Western Turkic Khaganate	Defeat	The Tang campaigns against the Western Turks (by Pei Xingjian) success and the Chinese established a "Persian military commandery" (波斯都督府) in the city of Zābol (疾陵城 Jilicheng) in Tokharistan, and Peroz was appointed as Military Commander (都督 Dudu). Then this government, with the capital at Zirang, fell in 673/674. After that, Narsieh went west with his troops to liberate Iranshahr in 679 and fought against the Arabs in Takharistan for almost thirty years.: The failure and end of the Persian restoration campaign attempt in Siege of Kamarja; Narsieh's uncle, Bahram, died in 710, and Bahram's son, Khosrow, was mentioned fighting alongside Sogdians and Turks against the Arabs at the siege of Kamarja in 729 in a futile attempt to restore Sasanian rule.

== Medieval Islamic era ==
Conflict	Persianate State (and allies)	Opponents	Results	Notes
Iranian Intermezzo (821–1090)
Arab–Khazar wars (642–799): Battle of Marj Ardabil	Caliphates: Rashidun Caliphate (until 661); Umayyad Caliphate (from 661 to 750); Abbasid Caliphate (since 750)	Khazar Khaganate	Stalemate	South Caucasus falls under the control of the Caliphate. Northward Muslim expansion is stopped at Derbent.; Jibal and Iranian Azerbaijan are sacked by Khazar raiders.
Persian revolts against the Rashidun Caliphate (650–661): Ali's Eastern Campaigns; Part of First Fitna and Muslim conquest of Persia	Persians	Rashidun Caliphate	Defeat	Arab control over Persia is consolidated. Start of Islamization of Iran
Kharijite Rebellions against Ali (657–661): Banu Najiyah revolt; Part of First Fitna	Rashidun Caliphate	Kharijites	Victory	Restoration of Alid control over Southern Persia and Bahrain; Assassination of Ali
Umayyad campaigns in Qiqan (661–711)	Abbasid Caliphate	Kingdom of Qiqan Turk Shahis	Victory	Islamisation of Balochistan
Muslim conquest of Transoxiana (673–751): Battle of Talas	Abbasid Caliphate Tibetan Empire Karluk mercenaries	Principalities of Tokharistan Sogdian principalities Khwarazm Fergana Türgesh Kaghanate Second Turkic Khaganate; Tang China	Victory	Islamization of Transoxiana; End of Chinese dominance and influence in Transoxiana
Second Fitna (Muslim civil war of 680–692)	Zubayrid Caliphate Alids Kharijites	Umayyad Caliphate	Defeat	Kharijite faction, the Azariqa, captures Fars and Kirman from the Zubayrids. Ex-Zubayrid loyalists help Umayyad to secured Iraq, and consequently most of its dependencies in Persia. Then, Umayyad victory after Siege of Mecca. Qatari ibn al-Fuja'a's revolt persists until his death in 698/699.
Umayyad campaigns in India (712–740): Arab conquest of Sindh; part of Muslim conquests in the Indian subcontinent	Umayyad Caliphate	Gurjara-Pratihara Guhila dynasty Maitraka dynasty Chalukya dynasty Karkota Empire	Defeat	Arab, and later Turco-Persian Muslim invasions of India, stop for the next 250 years.; Islamisation of modern Pakistan.
Al-Harith ibn Surayj's Revolt (734–746): Battle of the Baggage; Battle of Kharistan	Murji'ah Iranian converts (mawali) Khorasani Arabs Supported by: Türgesh; Sogdian princes of Transoxiana	Umayyad Caliphate Supported by: Principality of Juzjan; Principality of Chaghaniyan	Defeat	Revolt suppressed
Revolts of Zayd ibn Ali (740)	Umayyad Caliphate	Alids	Victory	Abbasid missionary movement begins to make headway in Khurasan.
Third Fitna (744–750): Al-Dahhak ibn Qays al-Shaybani's revolt; Juday al-Kirmani's revolt; Abbasid Revolution	Abbasid Caliphate Supported by: Some Arabs; Alids/Shia Muslims (mostly Persians); Mawali; Kharijites	Umayyad Caliphate Supported by: Qays	Victory	Abbasid appropriation of most former Umayyad territory; Eventual establishment of the Emirate of Córdoba; End of privileged status for Arabs; End of official discrimination against non-Arabs
Mount Lebanon revolts of 752 and 759 (752/759)	Abbasid Caliphate: Tanukhids; Lakhmids	Eastern Christians: Mardaites; Maronites; Melkites; Supported: Byzantine Empire	Victory	Christian inhabitants of parts of interior and coastal Lebanon expelled and replaced with Arab tribes
Sunpadh Rebellion (755)	Sunpadh Movement Supported by : Daylamites Dabuyids of Tabaristan	Abbasid Caliphate	Defeat	Zoroastrians and Persian Zindiqs/Heretics (worshipers of Abu Muslim) are repressed.
An Lushan rebellion (755–763)	Tang China Supported by: Iranian Christians; Buddhists; Uyghur Khaganate; Abbasid Caliphate; Arab, Persian and Khwarazmian forces	Yan (An–Shi)	Victory	Tang suppress the revolt with the help of Caliph Al-Mansur "black banners" expeditionary force.: Some Abbasid expeditionaries (mainly Iranians or Persianized Turks) settle in Northwestern China and brings Islam in China, becoming the earliest ancestors of Hui people, with Persian language as their Lingua franca.
Abbasid Conquest of Tabaristan (758–761)	Dabuyid dynasty Masmughans of Damavand	Abbasid Caliphate	Defeat	Annexation of Tabaristan to the Abbasid Caliphate
Sack of Guangzhou (758): Part of An Lushan rebellion	Abbasid Caliphate: Arab and Persian merchants	Tang China	Victory	Abbasid backed merchants succeeded in their retaliation against the mistreatment of foreigners and Muslim merchants by the Tang forces during the An Lushan rebellion.
Yangzhou massacre (760): Part of An Lushan rebellion	Abbasid Caliphate: Arab and Persian merchants	Chinese forces under Tian Shengong	Defeat	
Alid revolt of 762–763 (762–763)	Abbasid Caliphate	Alids	Victory	Revolt suppressed with the help of Iranian troops
Tabaristan uprising (781–805)	Karenids Bavandids Baduspanids Zarmihrids	Abbasid Caliphate Supported: Barmakids	Defeat	Arabs conquered Tabaristan in 758–759.: The Suppression of the uprising
Hamzeh Azarak Revolt (795)	Kharijites	Abbasid Caliphate	Defeat	Iranian peasant revolt is repressed.
Abbasid expeditions to East Africa (804, 827/837)	1st phase Abbasid Caliphate 2nd phase Persians wālīs of Zanj	1st phase Africans from Zanj: Mogadishu; Kilwa; 2nd phase Abbasid Caliphate	Victory	The Kharaj is imposed on the Africans. Persian rebels against Mihna get a compromise.
Rafi ibn al-Layth's Revolt in Khurasan (806–809)	Abbasid Caliphate: Governorate of Khorasan; Abna al-dawla	Samarkand Iranians Khorasani Arabs Turkic peoples: Oghuz; Karluk	Victory	Revolters defeat Ali ibn Isa ibn Mahan and Harun al-Rashid. Then surrenders to Harun's son in exchange of pardon
Zutt Rebellion (810–835)	Abbasid Caliphate	Zuṭṭ	Victory	Zutt colonization of Khuzestan after being expelled from Iraq.
Fourth Fitna (Abbasid civil war of 811–813/819)	Al-Ma'mun (supported mostly by Persian forces): Tahir ibn Husayn	Al-Amin (supported mostly by Arab forces): Ali ibn Isa ibn Mahan	Victory	Defeat and death of al-Amin; al-Ma'mun is recognized as Caliph on 27 September 813. Tahir ibn Husayn rewarded as governor of Khorasan, which marked the beginning of the Tahirids.
Babak Khorramdin Revolt (816–837)	Abbasid Caliphate	Khurramite Zoroastrians Supported: Byzantine Empire	Victory	Capture and execution of Babak Khorramdin
Hamza ibn Azarak's Kharijites rebellion in Sistan (823–828)	Tahirid dynasty Abbasid Caliphate	Kharijites	Inconclusive	Hamza's death in 828 and the death of Talha shortly after put an end to this series of conflicts.
Kharijite revolt of Bilal al-Dibabi (829)	Abbasid Caliphate	Kharijites	Victory	Revolt is suppressed by Ujayf ibn Anbasa in northern Persia.
Mazyar uprising (839)	Tahirid dynasty Abbasid Caliphate	Spahbed Mazyar and Khaydhar ibn Kawus al-Afshin's forces	Defeat	Mazyar was arrested and sent to Baghdad. Tahirid control over Tabaristan was therefore secured. Mazyar was Crucified next to babak in 840CE
Wars between Alawites of Tabaristan and Taheri (864–867): Zaydid revolt of 864; Part of Anarchy at Samarra	Tahirid dynasty Abbasid Caliphate	Alid dynasties of northern Iran: Hasan ibn Zayd's forces	Defeat	Hasan, who assumed the regnal name al-Da'ī ila'l-ḥaqq ("He who summons to the Truth"), was recognized as emir of Tabaristan.
Caspian expeditions of the Rus' (864–1041)	Abbasid Caliphate: Alid dynasties of northern Iran; Samanid Empire; Shirvanshah; Buyid dynasty; Sallarid dynasty; • Khazars (from 965): Burtas; Alans • Byzantine Empire (941) Sarir Volga Bulgaria	Kievan Rus' Oghuz Turks: Pechenegs; • Khazars (until 943)	Stalemate	Occupation of several areas on the outskirts of the Volga and the Dnieper by the Russians. Start of Russian expansionism on the Caucasus.; The disintegration of the Khazar Empire; Sack of different areas by the Russians in Iranian territories near Caspian Sea; The local Muslims defeated the Russians in their attempts to conquest Persian territories.
Zanj Rebellion: Al-Ahwaz theater; (869–883)	Zanj slave rebels Allied Arabs: Banu Tamim; Banu Asad ibn Khuzaymah; Bahila; Saffarids	Abbasid Caliphate	Defeat	Revolt suppressed
Hindu Shahi–Saffarid wars (870–900)	Saffarids	Hindu Shahis Lawik dynasty	Inconclusive	Saffarids withdraw from Medieval India due to the rise of Samanid Empire and Lawik dynasty.
Justanid-Abbasid clashes (876–879): Part of Anarchy at Samarra	Justanids Alids	Abbasid Caliphate	Stalemate	Justan III consolidates his throne.
Battle of al-Baida (874/875)	Saffarids	Kharijites	Victory	Ya'qub ibn al-Layth defeated the Kharijite leader Muhammad ibn Wasil
Battle of Dayr al-Aqul (876): Part of Anarchy at Samarra	Saffarids	Abbasid Caliphate	Defeat	Abbasid rule in Iraq is defended.
Saffarid-Abbasid War (884/85–892)	Saffarids	Abbasid Caliphate Dulafid dynasty	Stalemate	
Samanid Civil War of 888	Nasr I forces	Ismail I forces	Defeat	Rise of Ismail I to power
Dulafid-Abbasid Conflict	Dulafid dynasty	Abbasid Caliphate	Defeat	Dulafid are deposed and replaced by a Caliphal governor (Isa al-Nushari).
Samanid conquest of northern Iran (900–901): Battle of Balkh; Battle of Gorgan (900)	Samanid Empire Supported by: Abbasid Caliphate	Saffarids Zaydids	Victory	Samanids took over the province of Tabaristan, Ismail then appointed his cousin Abu'l-Abbas Abdullah as the governor of Tabaristan.
Sajid invasion of Georgia (914)	Sajid dynasty	Tao-Klarjeti Kingdom of Kakheti; Kingdom of Abkhazia	Stalemate	Despite military victories, sajid withdraw from Georgia
Sajid invasion of Armenia (921)	Sajid dynasty	Kingdom of Armenia	Defeat	Armenia maintains its independence.
Qarmatian invasion of Iraq (927–928)	Abbasid Caliphate Sajid dynasty	Qarmatians of Bahrayn Baqliyya rebels	Stalemate	End of Qarmatian expansionism Collapse of the Abbasid Empire
Battle of Iskhabad (940): Part of the Samanid–Ziyarid Wars	Ziyarid dynasty Firuzanids	Samanid Empire	Defeat	Samanid conquest of the territory
Battle of Baghdad (946)	Buyids	Hamdanids	Victory	Buyid Emirate is consolidated in Iraq.
Rebellion of Bardas Phokas the Younger (987–989)	Rebels from Phokas clan Support from: Principality of Tao Buyid Dynasty: 2,000 Georgians, Armenians until 988; Rebels from Bardas Skleros: Arab mercenaries until mid-987	Byzantine Empire: Loyalists to Basil II; Kievan Rus'	Defeat	Revolt suppressed
Saffarid dynasty (861–1003)
Yaqub's campaigns to the east (861–870): part of Muslim conquests in the Indian subcontinent	Saffarid dynasty: Abbasid Caliphate	Zunbils Kharijites Medieval India: Hindu Shahis; Buddhist tribal chiefs	Victory	Ya'qub ibn al-Layth al-Saffar marched through Bost, Kandahar, Ghazni, Kabul, Bamyan, Balkh and Herat, conquering them in the name of Islam.
Saffarid-Abbasid War (873–876): Battle of Dayr al-Aqul; Part of Abbasid decline (861–940)	Saffarid dynasty Ayyars	Abbasid Caliphate: Tahirid dynasty; Zaydid	Defeat	In 873, Ya'qub ibn al-Layth al-Saffar ousted the Tahirids from their own capital of Nishapur, and captured its ruler Muhammad ibn Tahir, which led to conflicts with the Abbasid caliphate.; The Abbasid caliph completely halted Ya`qub's advance and put an end to what was arguably a major threat to the Abbasid Caliphate.
Battle of Mecca (883): Part of Abbasid decline (861–940)	Saffarid dynasty Abbasid Caliphate	Tulunids	Victory	The invaders are expelled from Mecca.
Battle of Balkh (900)	Saffarid Amirate	Samanid Empire	Defeat	The Saffarids lose much territory to the Samanids in Khorasan, and were left with the control of Fars, Kerman and Sistan, but they also lost these provinces after a civil war.
Saffarid Campaign in the Fars province (900–904)	Saffarid Amirate	Abbasid Caliphate	Victory	Temporarily regained Fars, but the Saffarids withdrew soon afterwards.
Military expedition against Makran (907 or 908)	Saffarid Amirate	Ma'danids	Victory	Saffarids able to compel the Ma'danid to pay three years of tribute.
Civil war between Tahir and the pretender Al-Layth (909–912)	Tahir ibn Muhammad ibn Amr	Al-Layth	Stalemate	Sebük-eri, who had managed to win over Tahir's commanders, won an easy victory and captured the brothers. They were sent to the Caliph and imprisoned in Baghdad, though they were treated well for the remainder of their lives.
Buyid-Saffarid War (967–968)	Saffarid dynasty	Buyid dynasty	Defeat	Adud al-Dawla negotiated peace with the Saffarid ruler Khalaf ibn Ahmad, who agreed to recognize Buyid authority.

== First Turco-Persian era ==
Conflict	Persianate State (and allies)	Opponents	Results	Notes
Ghaznavid dynasty (962–1186)
Ghaznavid campaigns in East Persia (999–1004): Ghaznavid conquest of Sistan; Ghaznavid campaign in Khorasan	Ghaznavid Empire	Saffarid Empire Samanid Empire	Victory	North-Eastern Persia annexed by the Afghan-centered Ghaznavid Sultanate (although still under suzerainty to the Abbasid Caliphs), and fall of both Samanids and Saffarids.
March of Sultan Mahmud of Ghazni to India (1001–1027): Battle of Chach; Siege of Lohkot (1015); part of Muslim conquests in the Indian subcontinent	Ghaznavid Empire	Medieval India: Hindu Shahis; Lohara dynasty	Victory	The northern parts of India were annexed by Iran. Somnath temple was destroyed and its treasures looted.
Kara-Khanid invasion of Khorasan (1006–1008)	Ghaznavid Empire	Kara-Khanid Khanate	Victory	Ghaznavids expels the invaders.
Ghaznavid conquest of Khwarazm (1017)	Ghaznavid Empire	Ma'munids	Victory	Ghaznavids expand to Central Asia.
Lohara-Ghazni conflict (1021)	Ghaznavid Empire	Lohara dynasty	Defeat	Victory for Sangramraja of Kashmir, expelling Persians from Kashmir.
Ghaznavid campaigns in West Persia (1026–1030)	Abbasid Caliphate: Ghaznavid Empire	Buyids Sallarids Ziyarids	Victory	Makran, Ray, Hamadan, Ishfahan, Tabaristan are conquered by Ghaznavids, who already controlled Sistan, Khorasan and parts of northern Persia.; Abbasid supremacy over Persia is secured by Ghaznavids.
Ghaznavid–Kakuyid war (1029–1039): Battle of Rey (1038)	Ghaznavid Empire Annazids	Kakuyids Buyids	Inconclusive	Conflict suspended due to the death of Ala al-Dawla Muhammad and the Seljuk expansionism.: Ghaznavid brief conquest of Kakuyid domains into Northwestern Iran; Avicenna's library destroyed during the war
Battle of Dabusiyya (1032)	Ghaznavid Empire	Kara-Khanid Khanate	Stalemate	Indecisive
Ghaznavid campaigns in India (10th and 11th centuries): March of Sultan Mahmud of Ghazni to India; Sack of Somnath; Ghaznavid invasion of Kannauj; part of Muslim conquests in the Indian subcontinent and Ghaznavid-Hindu Shahi conflicts	Ghaznavid Empire	Medieval India: Hindu Shahis; Rajput confederacy; Jatts; Chandelas; Kachchhapaghata dynasty; Gurjara-Pratihara dynasty; Lodi dynasty of Multan; Tomara dynasty	Victory	The northern parts of India were annexed by Iranian states.; Somnath temple was destroyed and its treasures looted.; Later Islamic empires would appear on the subcontinent.

Seljuq Empire (1037–1194)
Seljuk-Ghaznavid Wars: Battle of Nisa (1035); Battle of Nishapur (1038); Battle of Sarakhs (1038); Battle of Dandanqan (1040); Battle of Dandanaqan (1040)	Seljuk Empire	Ghaznavid Empire	Victory (Regime change)	• Fall of the Ghaznavid Empire in Iran • Rise of the Seljuk Empire and Turco-Persian tradition
Siege of Hamadan (1047)	Seljuk Empire	Kakuyids Annazids Buyids	Victory	Hamedan and Isfahan are conquered by the Seljuk empire.
Georgian–Seljuk wars (1048–1213)	Seljuk Empire	Kingdom of Georgia: Zakarid Armenia	Defeat	Initial victory on the Great Turkish Invasion. Then Georgia frees itself from being a tributary of the Seljuks.
Byzantine–Seljuq wars (1048–1308): Battle of Kapetron; Battle of Manzikert	Seljuk Empire	Byzantine Empire Empire of Trebizond; Crusader states Kingdom of Georgia	Victory	Most of Anatolia is conquered by the Seljuks.
Sieges of Baghdad (1055–1059)	Seljuk Empire Supported by: Abbasid Caliphate	Buyid dynasty Supported by: Fatimid Caliphate	Victory	
Overthrow of the Qarmatians (1058–1077)	Seljuk Empire Uyunid Emirate; Abbasid Caliphate	Qarmatians	Victory	End of Qarmatian rule in eastern Arabia
Seljuk war of succession (1063): Battle of Damghan (1063)	Alp Arslan forces	Qutalmish forces	Victory	Alp Arslan obtains the throne.
Battle of Manzikert (1071)	Seljuk Empire	Byzantine Empire	Victory	Seljuks enter Anatolia.
Seljuk Civil War: Battle of Kerj Abu Dulaf (1073)	Seljuk Empire: Malik-Shah I forces	Kerman Seljuk Sultanate: Qavurt and his son's forces	Victory	Malik Shah maintains the throne
Battle of Ain Salm (1086)	Seljuk Empire	Sultanate of Rûm	Victory	Death of Suleiman ibn Qutalmish
Nizari–Seljuk conflicts (1090–1194)	Seljuk Empire; Abbasid Caliphate; Fatimid Caliphate (succeeded by the Ayyubid Sultanate); Crusader states	(Nizari) Ismailis of Persia and Syria: Order of Assassins	Stalemate	Nizaris consolidate a state in Daylam, Quhistan, and Jabal Bahra', then controls other scattered areas in Alborz mountains, Zagros mountains, and Khurasan.
First Crusade (1095–1099): Part of Crusades	Muslims : Seljuk Empire; Abbasid Caliphate; Fatimid Caliphate	Crusaders; Kingdom of France; Byzantine Empire; Armenian Cilicia; County of Flanders; Papal States; Republic of Genoa; Holy Roman Empire; County of Sicily; Duchy of Apulia and Calabria	Defeat	The Crusade assists in capturing Nicaea, restoring much of western Anatolia to the Byzantine Empire; The Crusaders successfully capture Jerusalem and establish the Crusader states
Siege of Mosul (1096)	Seljuk Empire	Uqaylid dynasty	Victory	Seljuks conquers the territory of the Uqaylid State
Battle of Ghazni (1117)	Seljuk Empire	Ghaznavid Empire	Victory	Bahram of Ghazna succeeded to the throne as the Seljuk's vassal
First Siege of Baghdad (1136)	Seljuk Empire	Abbasid Caliphate	Victory	al-Rashid fled the city for Mosul, where he abdicated the caliphate. His uncle, al-Muqtafi, was raised to the throne instead by Mas'ud, who then retired to the east.
Battle of Qatwan (1141)	Seljuk Empire Kara-Khanids Kakuyids	Qara Khitai (Western Liao) Karluks	Defeat	Khwarazm became a vassal state of the Kara-Khitan.
Second Crusade (1147–1150): Part of Zengid–Crusader War and Crusades	Muslim : Seljuk Empire; Sultanate of Rum; Emirate of Zengids; Emirate of Damascus; Abbasid Caliphate; Fatimid Caliphate; Nizari Ismaili state in Syria (the Assassins)	Crusaders; Jerusalem; Tripoli; Antioch; Kingdom of France; Holy Roman Empire (Germany); Byzantine Empire; Kingdom of England; Kingdom of Sicily; Papal States; Western front (Reconquista): Kingdom of Portugal; County of Barcelona; León-Castile; Kingdom of France; Republic of Genoa; Republic of Pisa; Wendish Crusade: Holy Roman Empire (Germany); Jutland-Kingdom of Denmark; Zealand/Scania-Kingdom of Denmark; Kingdom of Poland	Victory	Lisbon captured by the Portuguese, Tarragona and Tortosa captured by the Catalans; Wagria and Polabia captured by the Saxon Crusaders
Second Siege of Baghdad (1157)	Seljuk Empire	Abbasid Caliphate	Defeat	Caliph al-Muqtafi successfully defended his capital against the coalition armies of Seljuq Sultan Muhammad of Hamadan and Qutb ad-Din of Mosul.

Ghurid dynasty (879–1215)
Battle of Ghazni (1148)	Ghurid dynasty	Ghaznavids	Victory	The Ghurid ruler Sayf al-Din Suri defeated Bahram-Shah and took the city while Bahram-Shah fled to India.
Battle of Ghazni (1151)	Ghurid dynasty	Ghaznavids	Victory	The Ghurid ruler Ala al-Din Husayn defeated Bahram-Shah, captured the city, and destroyed it as revenge for the execution of his brother Quṭb ud-Dīn in 1149.
Indian campaigns of Muhammad of Ghor (1175–1206): First Battle of Tarain; Second Battle of Tarain; Battle of Chandawar; Siege of Bayana; Siege of Gwalior (1196); Battle of Kasahrada (1197); Ghurid invasion of Bengal; Battle of Jhelum (1206); Siege of Kalinjar	Ghurid dynasty	Rajput confederacy: Chahamanas of Shakambhari; Gahadavala dynasty; Sena dynasty Soomra dynasty Ghaznavids Qarmatians Tibetan tribes	Victory	Muhammad of Ghor seizes much of northern India.; Foundation of Delhi Sultanate; Islamization of Bangladesh
Ghurid-Qara Khitai conflicts (1198–1200s)	Ghurid dynasty	Qara Khitai	Defeat	Qara Khitai raiders plunder the northern part of the Ghurid state.
Ghurid conquest of Khorasan (1200–1201)	Ghurid dynasty	Khwarazmian dynasty	Victory	Ghurid expansion to the north as far as Gorgan and Bastam.
Battle of Andkhud (1204)	Ghurid dynasty	Khwarazmian dynasty Qara Khitai Kara-Khanid Khanate	Defeat	Ghurids lost suzerainty of Khurasan to the Khwarezmian Empire, starting their decline.
Battle of Kakadadaha (1205)	Ghurid empire	Chandelas of Jejakabhukti	Defeat	Chandelas' victory
Ghurid invasion of Tibet (1206)	Ghurid dynasty	Tibetan people (Era of Fragmentation)	Defeat	Death of Muhammad Bakhtiyar Khalji

Khwarazmian dynasty (1077–1231)
Khwarazmian conquest of Persia (1156–1215): Battle of Rey (1194); Siege of Herat (1202); Siege of Gurgānj (1202); Battle of Amu Darya (1204); Battle of Hezarasp (1204); Battle of Andkhud (1204)	Khwarazmian Empire Supported by: Abbasid Caliphate; Qara Khitai (sometimes)	Seljuk Empire Ghurid dynasty Bavand dynasty Kara-Khanid Khanate	Victory (Regime change)	Seljuks are overthrown with the death of Toghrul III by the Khwarazmian army at the Battle of Rey.; Ghiyath al-Din Mahmud recognise the Khwarazmian suzerainty over Ghurids. The Ghurid dynasty ended in 1215.
Irghiz River skirmish (1209/1219)	Khwarazmian Empire	Mongol Confederation	Stalemate	Inconclussive due to Mongol retreat in order to chase Merkits or Naimans dissidents instead of battling Persia.
Khwarazmian–Qara Khitai Wars (1210–1220)	Khwarazmian Empire Kara-Khanid Khanate Co-belligerent: Mongol Empire (since 1218)	Qara Khitai Supported by: Mongol clans: Naimans	Inconclussive	Syr Darya becomes the de facto frontier between both states.; Conflict suspended due to the Rise of Genghis Khan and Mongol conquest of the Qara Khitai.
Khwarazmian-Abbasid Conflicts (1215–1217)	Khwarazmian Empire	Abbasid Caliphate	Inconclussive	The Turco-Persian army was caught in a blizzard and returned home.
Mongol invasion of Persia (1218–1256): Mongol invasion of Khwarezmia; Mongol campaign against the Nizaris; part of Mongol invasion of Central Asia and the Mongol invasions of India	Khwarazmian dynasty Nizari Ismaili state Abbasid Caliphate Co-belligerent: Jin dynasty Western Xia	Mongol Empire	Defeat (Regime change)	Khwarezmia domains added to the Mongol Empire; Jalal al-Din Mangburni resists in exile until 1231 in India and the Caucasus.; Mongol invasions of Georgia and Mongol invasions of Anatolia begin.
Georgian-Khwarazmid war (1225–1228): Battle of Garni; Siege of Tbilisi (1226); Battle of Bolnisi	Khwarazmian dynasty: Principality of Maragheh	Kingdom of Georgia: Kipchaks; Alans; Vainakhs; Leks	Victory	Khwarezmian last domains added the Georgian domains
Seljuk-Khwarazmid war (1230): Battle of Yassıçemen	Khwarezm Shahs Seljuk rebels Empire of Trebizond	Seljuk Sultanate of Rûm Ayyubid Sultanate	Defeat	Khwarezmian last domains partitioned between Seljuks and Mongols
Siege of Jerusalem (1244)	Ayyubid Sultanate Khwarazmians	Kingdom of Jerusalem	Victory	Muslim capture of Jerusalen

== Mongolian era ==
Conflict	Persianate State (and allies)	Opponents	Results	Notes
Ilkhanid dynasty (1256–1335)
Mongol invasions of Anatolia (1241–1335): Part of Mongol invasion of West Asia	Mongol Empire: Ilkhanate; Principality of Khachen	Sultanate of Rum Anatolian Beyliks	Victory	Mongols add the Anatolian domains to Persian-centered Ilkhanate.
Georgian Rebellion of 1256: Part of Mongol invasions of Georgia	Mongol Empire: Ilkhanate	Georgia	Victory	Rebellion suppressed. Georgian vilayats are submitted to Persia-centered Ilkhanate.
Siege of Baghdad (1258)	Mongol Empire: Ilkhanate; Georgia; Armenian Cilicia; Principality of Antioch	Abbasid Caliphate	Victory	Abbasid territories added to Persian centered Ilkhanate and starts the Mongol invasions of the Levant; End of the Islamic Golden Age
Mongol-Ayyubid War (1259–1260): Siege of Mayyafariqin; Siege of Aleppo (1260)	Mongol Empire: Ilkhanate; Armenian Cilicia; Principality of Antioch; Zakarids Proshyans Zengids	Ayyubid Dynasty	Victory	Mongols adds Aleppo (modern Syria) to the Persian-centered Ilkhanate. Then clashes with the Mamluk Sultanate.
Mongol invasions of the Levant (1260–1323): Mongol raids into Palestine; Part of the Crusades (Lord Edward's crusade and Crusade of the Infants of Aragon)	Ilkhanate of the Mongol Empire: Cilician Armenia; Kingdom of Georgia; Seljuk Sultanate of Rum; Antioch-Tripoli; Yuan Empire; Golden Horde of the Mongol Empire (1259–1264); Kingdom of Jerusalem; Knights Templar; Knights Hospitaller	Egyptian Mamluk Sultanate Ayyubid remnants Nizari Ismailis of Syria Golden Horde of the Mongol Empire (after 1264) Karamanid rebels Abbasids	Defeat	Mongols fail to conquer Egypt or get a formal Franco-Mongol alliance.
Toluid Civil War (1260–1264)	Kublai Khan and his allies	Ariq Böke and his allies	Victory	Fragmentation of the Mongol Empire
Berke–Hulagu war (1262)	Ilkhanate Supported by: Byzantine Empire	Golden Horde Supported by: Egyptian Mamluk Sultanate	Inconclusive	Fragmentation of the Mongol Empire
Kaidu–Kublai war (1268–1301): Battle of Herat (1270)	Yuan dynasty Ilkhanate (ally of Kublai)	Chagatai Khanate House of Ögedei Golden Horde (ally of Kaidu until 1284)	Inconclusive	Fragmentation of the Mongol Empire
Esen Buqa–Ayurbarwada war (1314–1318)	Yuan China Ilkhanate	Chagatai Khanate	Victory	Fragmentation of the Mongol Empire
Golden Horde-Ilkhanate War (1318–20)	Ilkhanate: Chobanids; Chagatai Khanate	Golden Horde Rebels: Chagatayid; Qara'unas; Irinjin of Anatolia; Qurumushi of Georgia	Victory	Fragmentation of the Mongol Empire
Chupanid Rebellion (1322–1327)	Ilkhanate: Kart dynasty; Supported by: Chagatai Khanate	Chobanids Jalayirids	Victory	Amir Chupan is executed by Abu Sa'id Bahadur Khan, who then gets to marry with Baghdad Khatun (daughter of Chupan).
Disintegration of the Ilkhanate (1335–57): Battle of Jaghatu; Battle of Qara Darra; Battle of Zava	(Ilkhanate) Various factions	(Ilkhanate) Various factions	Collapse of the dynasty (Regime change)	Fragmentation of the Ilkhanate: Oirats' political power vanishes from Iranian society.; Muzaffarid conquers Kirmanshah and all Injuids' domains.; Rise of the Jalayirid Sultanate as the dominant power.
Jalayirid dynasty (1335–1432)
Jalayirid conquest of Azerbaijan (1356–60)	Chobanids (until 1357) Jalayirid Sultanate	Golden Horde (until 1358) Muzaffarids	Victory	Jani Beg conquers Tabriz and kills Malek Ashraf. Then Berdi Beg quits of the region due to Golden Horde's Great Troubles.; Mubariz al-Din Muhammad briefly takes the regionthen quits.; Shaykh Uways Jalayir gets to conquer former Chobanid Azerbaiyan
Muzaffarid Civil War (1363–74)	Muzaffarids loyals to sha Mahmud Supported by: Jalayirid Sultanate	Muzaffarids loyals to Shah Shoja Mozaffari	Stalemate	Jalayirid expands their domains in Iran, but Shah Shoja Mozaffari gets to rule the Muzaffarid state (from Isfahan to Balochistan).
Anti-Jalayirid revolts of 1364–1367	Jalayirid Sultanate	Shirvanshah Kavus' rebels of Shirvan Khwaja Murjan's rebels of Baghdad Supported by: Qara Qoyunlu; Mamluks	Victory	Both revolts are suppressed and the rulers again recognise vassalage to Jalayirids.
Jalayarid conquest of Eastern Iran (1371–74)	Jalayirid Sultanate	Wali of Astarabad Sarbadars	Victory	Jalayirid's rule is consolidated over all of Iran.
Jalayarid wars of Succession (1374–1384)	Jalayirid Sultanate Support against invaders: Shirvanshahs; Qara Qoyunlu (since 1383)	Jalayarid pretenders: Shaikh Ali Jalayir; Sultan Ahmed Jalayir; Shaikh Bayazid Jalayir; Invaders: Muzaffarids; Qara Qoyunlu (until 1383)	Stalemate	Shaikh Hussain Jalayir maintains his rule over whole Jalayirid domains, but starting the decadence of the Sultanate. Then, Ahmad Jalayir deposes his brother in 1382 and defeats the rest of his brothers.
Golden Horde raid to Iranian Azerbaiyan (1385)	Jalayirid Sultanate Emirate of Hakkâri	Golden Horde Co-Belligerents: Timurid dynasty; Chagatai Khanate	Defeat	Jalayirid domains are devastated by the raids, being weakened to near collapse.

== Second Turco-Persian era ==
Conflict	Persianate State (and allies)	Opponents	Results	Notes
Timurid dynasty (1370–1507)
Campaigns of Timur (1380–1405): Timurid invasion of Chagatai; Tokhtamysh–Timur war; Timurid invasions of Georgia; Timurid invasions of Simsim; Timurid invasion of India; Siege of Damascus; Battle of Ankara; Siege of Smyrna	Timurid dynasty: Barlas Mongols; Uzbeks; Tajiks; Persians; Western Chagatai Khanate: Mongols; White Horde Grand Principality of Moscow Crimean Khanate	Muzaffarids; Jalayirid Sultanate Sarbadars; Tughlaq dynasty Moghulistan (Eastern Chagatai) Golden Horde: Blue Horde; Alans; Zichia; Simsim; Vainakhs; Circassians; Russians; Kingdom of Georgia: Nakh peoples; Ismailists; Delhi Sultanate Mamluks; Ottoman Empire: Anatolian beyliks; Black Tatars; Albanian principalities; Moravian Serbia; District of Branković; Wallachia; Knights Hospitaller Ming China	Victory	Rise of the Timurid Empire in Iran and the Turco-Persian tradition; End of nominal Mongol suzerainty over Russia; Also Devastation of Yelets by Timurids; Nogai Horde, the Uzbeg and Kazakh hordes are stablished as rumps of the Golden Horde.; Chagatai is abolished after the death of Sultan Mahmud.; The Delhi Sultanate became a Timurid vassal.; Outbreak of the Ottoman Civil War; Decadence of the Genoese colonies in the Black Sea and Caspian Sea; Death of Timur cancels the plans for a major Turco-Persian invasion of China to restore the Mongol Empire under Islam.
Battle of Mush (1387): Part of Timurid Invasion of Azerbaijan	Timurid dynasty	Qara Qoyunlu	Defeat	Qara Yusuf temporarily expels the Timurids.
Battle of Algami Canal (1402): Part of Timurid Invasion of Iraq	Timurid dynasty	Qara Qoyunlu	Victory	Sultan Ahmed Jalayir and Qara Yusuf both escaped Iraq again and fled towards Egypt
Timurid Civil Wars (1405–~1501): Battle of Sarakhs (1459); Siege of Shahrukhiya	Various factions	Various factions	Collapse of the dynasty (Regime change)	Rise of the Shi'ite Safavid dynasty
Georgian invasion of Timurid Domains (1405–1407): Qara Qoyunlu raid of Georgia (1407)	Timurid dynasty Qara Qoyunlu	Kingdom of Georgia	Defeat	George VII of Georgia succeeded in expanding Georgia's borders temporarily to their former extent (regaining Nakhchivan and Ganja).
Battle of Nakhchivan (1406): Part of Timurid Invasion of Azerbaijan	Timurid dynasty	Qara Qoyunlu Chakhirlu	Defeat	Invasion repelled and Qara Qoyunly conquest of Whole Azerbaijan.
Battle of Jalalak Marpinchin (1359)	Afrasiyab dynasty	Mar'ashis	Defeat	Rise of Mir-i Buzurg and death of Kiya Afrasiyab.
Battle of Qarabagh (1469)	Timurid dynasty	Aq Qoyunlu	Defeat	Timurid loses the control of Azerbaiyan and any chance to reconquer Iran or Iraq.

Qara Qoyunlu (1374–1468)
Battle of Sardrud (1408)	Qara Qoyunlu Jalayirid Sultanate	Timurid dynasty	Victory	Miran Shah dies.; Collapse of Timurid dynasty in Western Iran; Ahmad Jalayir captures Baghdad.; Rise of Qara Yusuf from Iranian Azerbaijan
Qara Qoyunlu invasion of Northern Iran (1409)	Qara Qoyunlu	Timurid dynasty	Defeat	Timurids expels invaders from Northern Iran.
Qara Qoyunlu conquest of Mardin (1409)	Qara Qoyunlu	Timurid dynasty: Artuqids	Victory	Mardin is captured by the Qara Qoyunlu.
Qara Qoyunlu–Jalayirid War (1410–1411)	Qara Qoyunlu	Jalayirid Sultanate	Victory	Ahmad Jalayir is executed and forced to crown Pirbudag, son of Qara Yusuf, as Shah of Iran (giving legitimacy to the Qara Qoyunlu).
Battle of Chalagan (1412)	Qara Qoyunlu: Karabakh	Kingdom of Georgia Princedom of Simsim Timurid dynasty: Shirvanshahs; Shaki	Victory	Shirvan is conquered by Qara Qoyunly; Constantine I of Georgia dies.
Qara Qoyunly–Aq Qoyunlu war (1417–1418)	Qara Qoyunlu	Aq Qoyunlu Supported by: Mamluk Sultanate	Victory	Qara Osman fled to Aleppo.
Timurid-Qara Qoyunlu War (1420–1434)	Qara Qoyunlu	Timurid dynasty: Aq Qoyunlu; Local rebel forces in Azerbaiyan and Kurdistan	Stalemate	Iskandar is briefly depossed by Shah Rukh and Qara Qoyunlu loses territories, but avoid a complete reconquest by the Timurids.
Qara Qoyunlu-Georgia War (1440–1444)	Qara Qoyunlu	Kingdom of Georgia	Stalemate	Tbilisi is sacked, but Jahan Shah returns without territorial gains.
Qara Qoyunlu 2nd conquest of Baghdad (1445–1447): Qara Qoyunlu-Aq Qoyunlu War of 1447	Qara Qoyunlu Supported by: Sheikh Hasan rebel forces	Arab Iraq rebels Supported by: Aq Qoyunlu; Mamluk Sultanate	Victory	Jahan Shah depose Alvand Mirza.
Timurid–Qara Qoyunlu War (1454–1459): Babur Mirza's Invasion of Khorasan; Siege of Samarkand (1454); Capture of Herat (1458); Battle of Sarakhs (1459)	Qara Qoyunlu	Timurids of Khorasan Timurids of Samarkand	Victory	Jahan Shah's conquest of Khorasan. All of Eastern Iran is captured by the Qara Qoyunlu.; Timurids are expelled to Transoxiana and the vassalage pact of Qara Qoyunlu to them is abolished.
Qara Qoyunly-Aq Qoyunlu war (1457–1469): Aq Qoyunlu conquest of Amid (1457); Qara Qoyunlu invasion of Eastern Anatolia (1466); Battle of Chapakchur (1467); Aq Qoyunlu conquest of Shiraz (1469)	Qara Qoyunlu	Aq Qoyunlu	Defeat (Regime Change)	Death of Jahan Shah, Mirza Yusuf and Rise of Aq Qoyunlu.
Revolt of Azerbaijan (1459)	Qara Qoyunlu	Hasan Ali rebel forces	Victory	Revolt Suppressed
Revolt of Fars and Shiraz (1464)	Qara Qoyunlu	Pir Budaq rebel forces	Victory	Revolt suppressed: Mirza Yusuf became governor of Fars province; Pir Budaq is translated to Bagdhad.
Revolt of Baghdad (1466)	Qara Qoyunlu	Pir Budaq rebel forces	Victory	Revolt suppressed: Pir Budaq is executed.
Battle of Chapakchur (1467)	Qara Qoyunlu	Aq Qoyunlu	Defeat	Fall of Qara Qoyunlu and end of Qara Qoyunlu–Aq Qoyunlu Wars.

Aq Qoyunlu (1378–1508)
Turkoman invasions of Georgia (1407–1502): part of Campaigns of Ismail I	Kara Koyunlu (1407–1468) Aq Qoyunlu (1468–1502)	Kingdom of Georgia Shirvanshah; Safavid Empire (1502)	Victory	End of invasions against Georgia and consolidation of Safavids in Persia
Campaign of Shirvan (1459–1460)	Aq Qoyunlu Safavid order	Shirvanshah	Defeat	Death of Shaykh Junayd
Siege of Gerger (1464–1465)	Aq Qoyunlu Pazuki Kurds	Mamluk Sultanate	Victory	Aq Qoyunlu conquer Harpoot.
Battle of Qarabagh (1469)	Aq Qoyunlu	Timurids	Victory	Decline of Timurids
Aq Qoyunlu–Mamluk War (1470–1474)	Aq Qoyunlu Dulkadirids: Pahlevanlu tribe	Mamluk Sultanate	Defeat	Decline of Aq Qoyunlu.
Aq Qoyunlu–Ottoman War (1473): Battle of Malatya; Battle of Otlukbeli	Aq Qoyunlu Supported by: Karamanids; Bey of Alaiye; Republic of Venice; Kingdom of Cyprus; Knights Hospitaller	Ottoman Empire Supported by: Anatolian beyliks	Defeat	Rise of the Ottoman Empire in West Asia
Battle of Khoy (1478)	Sultan Khalil's forces	Sultan Yaqub's forces	Defeat	Sultan Yaqub overthrow Sultan Khalil as Padishah
Revolts against Yaqub (1478–80)	Aq Qoyunlu	Bayandur princes Safavid order	Victory	Revolts suppressed
Battle of Urfa (1480)	Aq Qoyunlu	Mamluk Sultanate Pechenegs	Victory	Mamluk invasion is repelled.
Sheikh Haydar's campaign to Circassia (1486–1487)	Aq Qoyunlu: Safavid order; Qizilbash; Rumlu; Shamlu	Circassia: Principality of Chemguy; Princedom of Kabardia; Alans (Ossetians)	Defeat	Circassian pyrrhic victory: The Turco-Persian forces withdraw from Circassia, but sacks the territory and captures 6000 prisoners.

== Safavid Iran ==
Conflict	Iran (and allies)	Opponents	Results	Notes
Safavid dynasty (1501–1736)
Campaigns of Ismail I (1500–1510): Battle of Gulistan (or Cabanı) (1500); Siege of Baku (1501); Battle of Sharur (1501); Siege of Tabriz (1501); Capture of Erzincan and Erzurum (1502); Conquest of Armenia (1502); Turkoman invasions of Georgia (1502); Perso-Uzbek War (1502–10); Conquest of Fars (1503); Conquest of Persian Iraq (1503); Battle of Hamadan (1503); Capture of Kerman (1503); Capture of Nakhchivan (1503); Conquest of Mazanderan (1504); Conquest of Yazd (1503); Yazidi uprising (1506–10); Conquest of Diyarbakir (1507–08); Battle of Baghdad (1508)	Safavid Dynasty	Shirvanshah; Aq Qoyunlu; Uzbeks; Kazakh Khanate; Afrasiyab dynasty; Yazidi rebels; Khanate of Bukhara	Victory (Regime change)	Safavid Iran is established.
Persian-Uzbek Wars (1502–1598): Safavid conquest of Shirvan; Battle of Marv; part of Campaigns of Ismail I	Safavid Empire	Uzbeks: Shaybanid Empire; Khanate of Bukh; Supported by: Kazakh Khanate	Victory	Fall of the Shaybanid Empire; Persian conquest of Khorasan
Ottoman–Persian wars (1505–1517): 1st Trabzon; Erzincan‍; 2nd Trabzon; Şahkulu rebellion; Nur Ali Khalifa rebellion; Chaldiran; Tabriz; Urfa‍; Mesopotamia‍; Ovacık; 2nd Diyarbakır; Harput; Sinjar‍; Kerh; Koçhisar; Mardin‍; Hasankeyf‍; Mosul; Dvin‍	Safavid Iran Supported by: Mamluk Sultanate; Pro-Safavid Kurds; Qizilbashs	Ottoman Empire Supported by: Bohtan; Principality of Bitlis; Emirate of Hasankeyf; Kingdom of Imereti (1517); Pro-Ottoman Kurds	Defeat	Eastern Anatolia and Northern Iraq ceded to the Ottomans.; End of Shia uprisings in the Ottoman Empire
Kurdish-Yazidi uprising against the Safavids (1506–1510)	Safavid Empire	Yazidis	Victory	Uprising suppressed when the Yazidi leader, Shir Sarim, was defeated in the battle
Portuguese–Safavid wars (1507–1625): Portuguese conquest of Hormuz; Battle of Reishahr; Battle of Leitao Coast; Safavid conquest of Bahrain; Capture of Cambarão; Anglo-Persian capture of Qeshm	Safavid Empire Imamate of Oman; Supported by: British East India Company	(Portugal) Portuguese Empire: Kingdom of Ormus; Supported by: (Spain) Spanish Empire (since 1580)	Victory	The Iranian military sought to punish the Portuguese in the Persian Gulf for the Iranians' grievances of Gambron, not only liberating the island of Hormuz but also forcing the Portuguese to withdraw to Mombasa in Kenya. Britain recognized Iran's sovereignty over the entire Persian Gulf.
Battle of Ghazdewan (1512)	Safavid Empire Mughal Empire	Khanate of Bukhara	Defeat	Uzbeks reconquerst of Transoxiana
Ismail I invasion of Georgia (1516–1522): Battle of Teleti	Safavid Empire Samtskhe-Saatabago rebels	Kingdom of Georgia: Samtskhe-Saatabago	Stalemate	Initial Persian victories, putting vassal governors in Georgia. Then withdrawal after Ottoman intervention
Battle of Jam (1528)	Safavid Empire	Uzbeks	Victory	Safavids Empire defeated Uzbeks and reconquered Herat.
Ottoman–Safavid War of 1523 (1532–1555), Part of Campaigns of Suleiman the Magnificent, French–Habsburg rivalry and Spanish–Ottoman wars	Safavid Empire Supported by: Habsburg monarchy; (Spain) Spanish Empire	Ottoman Empire Supported by: France	Defeat	Ottomans captured Lower Mesopotamia and Baghdad. First partition of the Caucasus between the Ottomans and Persians. Western Armenia and western Georgia falls in Ottoman hands, Eastern Armenia, eastern Georgia, Dagestan and the contemporary Republic of Azerbaijan remain in Persian hands. A Habsburg–Persian alliance is consolidated in reaction to the Franco-Ottoman alliance.
Georgian-Safavid wars (1541–1659): Tahmasp I's Kakhetian and Kartlian campaigns; Battle of Garisi; Battle of Digomi; Abbas I's Kakhetian and Kartlian campaigns; Battle of Tsitsamuri; Battle of Aghaiani; Battle of Martqopi; Battle of Marabda; Bakhtrioni uprising	Safavid Empire	Kingdom of Kartli Kingdom of Kakheti	Stalemate	Persians subdue Georgian kingdoms as vassals of Safavids, but Georgian autonomy was restored
Humayun campaign in Kandahar (1545–1555)	Mughal Empire (loyal to Humayun) Supported by: Safavid Empire	Mughal Empire (loyal to Kamran Mirza); Uzbek khanates; Sur Empire; Afghans	Stalemate	Humayun rebelled against Persian garrison and took Kandahar for himself, then ceded it to Safavids in 1554 and later retook it again.; Humayun established his own empire and retook his rights as Mughal King after the Battle of Sirhind (1555).
Persian expedition to Kandahar (1558)	Safavid Empire	Mughal Empire	Victory	Kandahar is annexed to Safavid Iran.; Start of Mughal–Persian rivalry
Uzbek invasion of Khorasan (1578)	Safavid Empire	Shaybanids	Victory	Uzbeks withdrew from northeastern Iran and Persians refused to pay them tribute.
Ottoman–Safavid War of 1578 (1578–1590)	Safavid Empire: Kingdom of Kartli	Ottoman Empire: (Autonomous Republic of Crimea) Crimean Khanate	Defeat	Treaty of Constantinople (1590)
Siege of Firuzjah castle (1579)	Safavid Empire	Mar'ashis	Victory	Death of Mirza Khan and annexation of their domains to Safavid direct rule.
Khorasan Civil War (1580)	Safavid Government: Mohammad Khodabanda royalist forces; Taklu and Turkman local forces	Safavid opposition: Abbas Mirza supporters; Shamlu and Ustalju rebel coalition	Defeat	Rise of Abbas the Great
Siege of Nishapur (1581)	Safavid Government: Ustajlu local forces	Safavid opposition: Shamlu rebels	Defeat	Ali-Qoli Khan Shamlu (mentor of Abbas Mirza) deposes Morteza Qoli Khan Parnak Turkman and is confirmed as local ruler of Khorasan by Mohammad Khodabanda.
Siege of Torbat (1582)	Safavid Government	Safavid opposition	Defeat	Expansion of Ali-Qoli Khan Shamlu and Abbas Mirza domains
Rind-Lashari War (1582–1612)	Safavid Government Mughal Empire	Rind tribe Lashari tribe	Defeat	Rind tribe unify Balochistan after defeating Lashari and become de facto independent from Mughals and Safavids.
Battle of Tirpol (1583)	Safavid Government	Safavid opposition	Stalemate	Reconciliation between the two parties
Qizilbash Civil War (1585): Battle of Sousse	Safavid Empire: Shamlu local forces; Supported by:Khanate of Bukhara	Ustajlu rebels	Defeat	Ali-Qoli Khan Shamlu retires to Herat and Abbas Mirza is captured by Morteza Qoli Khan Parnak Turkman (who became local ruler of Mashhad)
Uzbek–Iranian War (1587–88)	Safavid Empire	Khanate of Bukhara	Defeat	Successful raid of Khorasan by the Uzbeks
Uzbek–Iranian War (1588–89)	Safavid Empire	Khanate of Bukhara	Defeat	Persian loss of Herat and death of Ali-Qoli Khan Shamlu
Uzbek–Iranian War (1592)	Safavid Empire	Shaybanids	Victory	Safavid reconquest of Nishapur
Mughal expedition to Kandahar (1595)	Safavid Empire	Mughal Empire Supported by: Safavid renegades loyals to Rustam Mirza Safavi	Defeat	Kandahar is annexed to Mughal Empire.; Anti-Safavid migration of Iranians to India; Casus belli for the Mughal–Safavid war of 1622
Battle of Herat (1598)	Safavid Empire	Shaybanids	Victory	Khorasan returned to Persians
Ottoman–Safavid War of 1603 (First Stage) (1603–1612)	Safavid Empire: Kingdom of Kartli; Kingdom of Kakheti	Ottoman Empire	Victory	Treaty of Nasuh Pasha (1612) Persian embassy to Europe (1609–1615)
Siege of Dimdim (1609–1610)	Safavid Empire	Emirate of Bradost	Victory	Uprising suppressed
Ottoman–Safavid War of 1603 (Second Stage) (1612–1618)	Safavid Empire: Kingdom of Kartli; Kingdom of Kakheti	Ottoman Empire	Victory	Treaty of Serav (1618)
Capture of Ormuz (1622)	Safavid Empire British East India Company	(Spain) Iberian Union: (Portugal) Portuguese Empire; Kingdom of Hormuz	Victory	Ormuz annexed to Persia
Mughal–Safavid War of 1622 (1622–1623)	Safavid Empire	Mughal Empire	Victory	Kandahar falls to Persia
Ottoman–Safavid War of 1623 (1623–1639)	Safavid Empire	Ottoman Empire	Defeat	Permanent partition of the Caucasus; western Georgia and Western Armenia go to the Ottomans, while Eastern Armenia, Dagestan, eastern and southern Georgia, and Azerbaijan remain under Persian rule. Ottomans decisively gain control of Mesopotamia.
Battle off Hormuz (1625): part of Dutch–Portuguese War	(Kingdom of England) English East India Company Dutch East India Company Supported by: Safavid Persia	(Portugal) Portuguese Empire: (Portugal) Estado da Índia	Draw	End of Portuguese influence on the Persian Gulf
Uzbek invasion of 1626	Safavid Empire	Khanate of Bukhara: Uzbeks	Victory	Uzbek withdrawal
Gharib Shah's Revolt (1629–1630): Uzbek invasion of 1630–1631	Safavid Empire aided by Qizilbash	Mazandaran and Gilan province aided by Uzbeks	Victory	Caspian Iran becomes a Khasah (Royal domain) and the local Sultanates are abolished to strengthen the Absolute monarchy.
Khan Ahmad Khan Ardalan revolt (1630)	Safavid Empire	Emirate of Ardalan Supported by: Ottoman Empire	Victory	Kurdish Revolt suppressed
Sher Khan revolt (1631)	Safavid Empire: Pashtuns of Durrani	Pashtuns of Pushang Supported by: Mughal Empire	Victory	Afghan Revolt suppressed
Dervish Reza's rebellion in Qazvin (1632)	Safavid Empire	Dervish Supported by: Occultists	Victory	Ban on esoteric interpretation of the Quran
Davud Khan's rebellion in Karabakh (1632)	Safavid Empire	Caucasus States: Georgians; Circassians; Armenians; Supported by: Ottoman Empire	Victory	Revolt suppressed
Tahmurts of Kakheti revolts in Georgia (1632–1648)	Safavid Empire	Georgians loyals to Teimuraz I of Kakheti	Victory	Revolts suppressed
Capture of Julfar (1633): part of the Omani–Portuguese conflicts	Safavid Empire (Portugal) Portuguese Empire	(Muscat and Oman) Omani Empire	Defeat	Omanis captured the two forts on Ras Al Khaimah.
Uzbek invasion of 1634	Safavid Empire	Khanate of Bukhara: Uzbeks; Supported by: Ottoman Empire	Victory	Uzbek withdrawal and Abd al-Aziz Khan of Bukhara's properties are sacked by Persians.
Qandahar Cession (1638)	Safavid Empire: Afghan loyalists; Supported by: Anti-Mughal rebels	Ali Mardan Khan rebels Supported by: Mughal Empire	Defeat	Mughal Shah Jahan annex Qandahar
Mughal–Safavid war of 1649 (1649–1653)	Safavid Empire • Khanate of Bukhara	Mughal Empire Jaipur State	Victory	Persia recaptured Kandahar
Russo-Persian War of 1651 (1651–1653)	Safavid Empire	Russia	Victory	Russian fortress on the Iranian side of the Terek River destroyed, and its garrison expelled
Bakhtrioni uprising (1659)	Safavid Empire Turcoman tribes	Kingdom of Kakheti aided by Tushetians, Pshavs, Khevsurs	Inconclusive	Kakheti remained under Persian rule
Safavid occupation of Basra (1697–1701)	Safavid Empire	Ottoman Empire: Basra Eyalet; Eastern Arabs	Defeat	Safavids retreat from the Persian Gulf.
Balochi raids (1699–1710s)	Safavid Empire: Kerman province; Kandahar Province; Kingdom of Kartli	Baloch people Pashtun tribes	Inconclusive	Death of George XI of Kartli, Kaikhosro of Kartli and Prince Alexander of Kartli; Brief rise of Mirwais Hotak and start of Hotaki-Safavid War
Afghan Rebellions against Safavid Persia (1709–1717): Hotak revolt (1709); Part of Campaigns of Ashraf Hotak	Safavid Iran Supported by: Afghan loyalists; Muslim Georgians	Hotak dynasty Sadozai Sultanate of Herat Supported by: Ghilji Pashtuns; Hotak	Defeat	Afghan independence from Iran: Establishment of the Hotak Empire; Start of the Persian–Afghan Wars
Hotaki-Safavid War (1716–1722): Hootaki conquest of Kerman; Battle of Gulnabad; Siege of Isfahan; Part of Persian–Afghan Wars and Campaigns of Ashraf Hotak	Safavid Empire	Hotaki dynasty Supported by: Afghans; Balochis; Zoroastrians	Defeat (Regime change)	Afghan control of most of Iran Rise of Nader Shah against Mahmud Hotak and then Ashraf Hotak
1717 Omani invasion of Bahrain (1717)	Safavid Empire	(Muscat and Oman) Omani Empire: Al Bin Ali mercenaries	Defeat	Persian loss of Bahrain
Sack of Shamakhi (1721)	Safavid Empire: Kingdom of Kartli	Rebellious Sunni Lezgins	Defeat	The Shia population is massacred and the city, ransacked
Russo-Persian War of 1722 (1722–1723): part of Lekianoba	Safavid Empire: Dagestan; Hotaki dynasty	Russian Empire; Cossack Hetmanate; Kingdom of Kartli; Melikdoms of Karabakh and Armenian rebels Co-belligerent: Ottoman Empire	Defeat	Treaty of Saint Petersburg (1723): Russians capture Derbent, Baku, and the provinces of Shirvan, Gilan, Mazandaran, and Astrabad for about a decade. Treaty of Constantinople (1724): Partition of Iran with the Ottomans, who receives Tiflis, Erevan, Ganja, Khoy, Quschi, Tasuj, Marand and Tabriz. Start of Ottoman-Hotaki War (1722-1727).
Hotaki dynasty's interruption (1722–1729)
Ottoman–Hotaki War (1722–1727): Part of Campaigns of Ashraf Hotak	Hotaki dynasty	Ottoman Empire	Victory	Treaty of Hamedan: Ottoman recognition of Ashraf Hotak as Shah of Persia, renouncing their attempts to restore the Safavid dynasty to the Iranian throne as an Ottoman vassal.; Ottoman sovereignty over all the western and northwestern parts of Iran (including most of Tabriz, Hamadan, Kermanshah, Lorestan and most of the southern Caucasus) recognised by Hotakis.
Return of Safavids (Nader) (1726–1729): Khorasan campaign of Nader Shah; Sabzevar expedition; Herat campaign of 1729; Liberation of Isfahan; Part of Persian–Afghan Wars and Campaigns of Ashraf Hotak	Hotaki dynasty Sadozai Sultanate of Herat Supported by: Ottoman Empire	Safavid Dynasty	Defeat (Regime change)	End of the Hotaki dynasty
Safavid Restoration (1729–1736)
Rebellion of Sheikh Ahmad Madani (1730)	Safavid Empire Nader's personal domains Supported by: English East India Company Dutch East India Company (VOC)	Forces Loyal to Sheikh Ahmad Madani Forces Loyal to Sheikh Jabbara Forces Loyal to Sheikh Rashid bin Sa'id of Basaidu Rebelling Arab tribes Hotak remnants and Afghan raiders	Victory	Revolt suppressed and reincorporation of Gulf Arabs to the empire
Battle of Zarghan (1730)	Safavid Empire	Hotaki dynasty local Arab tribes	Victory	Afghans expelled from Iran (Persia)
Herat campaign of 1731 (1731)	Safavid Empire Afghan loyalists	Sadozai Sultanate of Herat Hotaki dynasty	Victory	Fall of Sadozai Sultanate of Herat
Ottoman-Safavid war of 1730 (Nader) (1730–1735): Western Persia campaign of 1730; Tahmasp's campaign of 1731; Nader Shah's Mesopotamian campaign; Caucasus Campaign (1735)	Safavid Empire • Erivan Khanate	Ottoman Empire • (Autonomous Republic of Crimea) Crimean Khanate Lezgins	Victory	Persian (Nader) reconquest of the entire Caucasus •Treaty of Constantinople and Treaty of Ganja
Mohammad Khan Baluch's Rebellion (1733–1734): part of Campaigns of Nader Shah	Safavid Empire	Forces loyal to Mohammad Khan Baloch	Victory	Southern Persia is re-annexed.

== Afsharid Iran ==
Conflict	Iran (and allies)	Opponents	Results	Notes
Afsharid dynasty (1736–1796)
Siege of Kandahar (1737–1738)	Afsharid dynasty	Hotaki dynasty	Victory	End of the Hotaki dynasty
Afsharid conquest of the Persian Gulf & Oman (1738–1747)	Afsharid dynasty	Omani Empire: Sultanate of Muscat; Imamate of Oman; Pirates	Victory	The Persian empire becomes the arbiter of the Persian Gulf until its collapse.
Nadir Shah's invasion of India (1738–1739): Khyber Pass; Battle of Karnal; Sack of Delhi; Nader Shah's Sindh expedition	Afsharid dynasty	Mughal Empire Hyderabad Oudh	Victory	Persian plundering of India
Nader's Central Asian Campaign (1738–1740): Pitnak (1740); Bukhara (1740); Samarkand (1740)	Afsharid dynasty	Khanate of Bukhara Khanate of Khiva	Victory	Conquest of the Central Asian khanates
Nader's Dagestan campaign (1741–1745): Withdrawal through Andalal (1741)	Afsharid dynasty	Lezgins Avar Khanate (Avars) Mekhtuly Khanate Gazikumukh Khanate Elisu Sultanate Shaki Khanate	Victory	The Persian Empire annexes almost all of Dagestan.
Ottoman–Persian War (1743–46) (1743–1746)	Afsharid dynasty	Ottoman Empire	Stalemate	Treaty of Kerden, Status quo ante bellum
Moḥammad Taqi Khan Shirazi's Rebellion (1744)	Afsharid dynasty	Persian rebels	Victory	Revolt suppressed
Division of the Afsharid Empire (1747–1796): Civil War between Afsharid and Qajar; 1st Durrani Campaign to Khorasan (1749–51); Battle of Kirkhbulakh; 2nd Durrani Campaign to Khorasan (1754–55); Durrani campaign in Khorasan (1769–1770)	Afsharid dynasty Supported by: Khorasanies; Iranian Azerbaijanis; Iranian Nobility; Kurds; Qara Bayat Amirdom Khozeimeh Amirdom	Safavid dynasty Supported by: Kurds; Arabs; Turkics; Jalayrids; Zand dynasty Supported by: Western Iranians; Qajar dynasty Supported by: Oghuz Turks; Iranians; Ulama; Other war-lords and factions Durrani Empire Supported by: Afghans; Khanate of Kalat; Georgians: Kartli-Kakheti; Imereti; Supported by: Russian Empire	Regime change	Adil Shah is deposed by his brother Ebrahim Afshar, who in turn is deposed by Shahrokh Shah (who also defeated Suleiman II's Safavid followers) and its Ashfarids domains are reduced to Khorasan and Eastern Iran.; Karim Khan Zand gets the control of Western Iran (after deposing Ali Mardan Khan Bakhtiari, who conquered Isfahan) in the nominal name of Ismail III's Safavid followers.; Then Mohammad Khan Qajar defeats Zands and Afsharids, becoming the Shah of Iran after re-unificating most of the realm.; Ahmad Shah Durrani stablish the Durrani Empire and independizates Afghanistan from the Iranian realm while also invaded India and clashed with China.; Treaty of Georgievsk between the separatist Kingdom of Kartli-Kakheti and Russian Empire; Anti-Afghan sentiment increases in Iran, leading to the Bloody neurosis (1759).
Durrani Campaign to Khorasan (1749–51): Siege of Nishapur (1750–1751); Part of Persian–Afghan Wars	Afsharids Qara Bayat Amirdom	Durrani Empire	Inconclusive	Durrani retreat
Durrani Campaign to Khorasan (1754–55): Siege of Nishapur; Part of Persian–Afghan Wars	Afsharids Qara Bayat Amirdom Qajar dynasty	Durrani Empire Khanate of Kalat	Defeat	Afghan dominance in the region
Durrani campaign in Khorasan (1769–1770): Part of Persian–Afghan Wars	Afsharids	Durrani Empire Khanate of Kalat	Defeat	Shahrokh again submits to Afghan suzerainty.

== Zand Iran ==
Conflict	Iran (and allies)	Opponents	Results	Notes
Zand dynasty (1751–1779)
Campaign against Azad Khan (1754–1762): Part of Persian–Afghan Wars	Zand dynasty	Azad Khan Afghan	Victory	Azad Khan's surrender
Bajalan uprising (1755)	Zand dynasty	Bajalan Tribe (Kurds) Bajalan Tribe	Victory	Uprising uppressed
Battle of Astarabad (1759)	Zand dynasty	Qajar Dynasty	Victory	Zand captures Astarabad.
Zand-Dutch War (1765)	Zand dynasty	(Netherlands) Dutch colonial empire: Dutch East India Company	Victory	Kharg Island reconquered by Persia and destruction of Fort Mosselstein
Ottoman-Persian War of 1775 (1775–1776)	Zand dynasty	Ottoman Empire	Victory	Persia captures Basra.
Bani Utbah invasion of Bahrain (1782–1783)	Persia: Bushehr	Sheikhdom of Kuwait Zubarah	Defeat	Al Khalifa annexes Bahrain into its sheikhdom.
Siege of Kerman (1794): Part of Qajar–Zand Wars	Zand dynasty	Qajar Dynasty	Defeat (Regime change)	Qajars conquer and sack Kerman.

== Qajar Iran ==
Conflict	Iran (and allies)	Opponents	Results	Notes
Qajar dynasty (1785–1925)
Uzbek invasion of Merv (1785–1788)	Qajar Iran	Emirate of Bukhara	Defeat	Iranian loss of Merv to the Emirate of Bukhara, leaving the area a wasteland without urban areas
Khorasan campaign of Agha Mohammad Khan Qajar	Qajar Iran	Turkmen rebels Afsharid Iran	Victory	Fall of Afsharid Iran
Qajar reconquest of Georgia (1795): Siege of Tbilisi (1795); Battle of Krtsanisi	Qajar Iran	Kartli-Kakheti; Imereti	Victory	Tbilisi captured and sacked by Iranians. Persian reconquest of the Caucasus and Georgia. Then, for reunificating all Persian provinces, Agha Mohammad is formally crowned Shah in 1796 in the Mughan plain.
Persian Expedition (1796)	Qajar Iran	Russian Empire	victory	Tactical Russian victory; Strategic Persian victory; Russian withdrawal after the death of Catherine II
Wahhabi raids on Najaf (1801–1811): Part of Iraqi-Saudi Wars	(Ottoman Empire) Pashalik of Iraq; Muntafiq Emirate; Religious authority of Najaf; Qajar Iran	Emirate of Diriyah	Victory	The Anti-Shi'ism raids of the House of Saud ended in failure at the Iran–Iraq border.
Russo-Persian War (1804–1813): Part of Napoleonic Wars and Russian conquest of the Caucasus	Qajar Iran	Russian Empire	Defeat	Treaty of Gulistan: Iran irrevocably cedes most of its Caucasus territories (Dagestan, Georgia, and most of the Azerbaijan Republic) to Russia. Start of Russian conquest of the Caucasus
Qajar–Wahhabi conflicts (1808–1812)–(1817–1818): Part of Ottoman–Wahhabi war	Qajar Iran Omani Empire Ottoman Empire: Ottoman Egypt	First Saudi state: Wahhabists; Bani Bu Ali tribe	Inconclusive	Wahhabi expansion into Oman and the coastal regions of the Persian Gulf.: Failure of the Persian military halt Wahhabi expansion.; Persian expedition into Najd (1810–1811); siege of Shibkuh (1817–1818)
Battle of Kafir Qala (1818): Part of Persian–Afghan Wars	Qajar Iran	Durrani Empire	Inconclusive	Both armies retreated
Ottoman–Persian War of 1821 (1821–1823)	Qajar Iran	Ottoman Empire	Victory	Treaty of Erzurum, status quo ante bellum
Herati Civil War (1823–1829): Part of Persian–Afghan Wars	Herat; Principality of Kandahar; Qajar Iran	Rival factions Aimaq tribesmen Uzbek tribesmen Hazara tribesmen Rebels; Herati Army defectors	Victory	Kamran Mirza Durrani remained as Ruler
Russo-Persian War of 1826 (1826–1828)	Qajar Iran	Russian Empire	Defeat	Treaty of Turkmenchay. Iran irrevocably cedes its last Caucasus territories comprising parts of the contemporary nation of Azerbaijan that were not ceded in 1813, as well as all of what is the current Armenia.
Siege of Herat (1833): Part of Persian–Afghan Wars	Qajar Iran	Herat	Inconclusive	Iranian withdrawal: Herat remains a vassal of Qajar Iran
Rawanduz Revolt (1829–1835)	Qajar Iran	Soran Emirate	Defeat	Qajar lose control of Iranian Kurdistan, which is the current Mukriyan region.
First Herat War (1837–1838): Part of Persian–Afghan Wars and Great Game	Qajar Iran Supported by: Russian Empire Principality of Qandahar	Emirate of Herat East India Company Supported by: British Empire Aimaq tribesmen Maimana Khanate Andkhui Khanate Sheberghan Khanate Sar-i Pul Khanate Bukhara Emirate Khiva Khanate	Defeat	Successful Persian siege at Herat; breach eventually repelled; temporary British occupation of Kharg Island; Persian withdrawal from Herat
First British occupation of Bushehr (1838)	Qajar Iran	British Empire	Victory	British expelled
Revolt of Hasan Khan Salar (1846–1850)	Qajar Iran Emirate of Herat	Forces Loyal to Hasan Khan Salar Turkmen tribesmen Shadlu Kurdish tribesmen	Victory	Khorasan is reincorporated.
Battle of Fort Tabarsi (1848–1849)	Qajar Iran	Bábís	Victory	Successful repression
Second Herat War (1856): Part of Persian–Afghan Wars	Qajar Iran	Emirate of Herat Supported by: (United Kingdom) United Kingdom Afghanistan	Victory	Successful siege of Herat; continued occupation until Persia's compliance with the Treaty of Paris; installment of Sultan Ahmad Khan as puppet ruler of Herat
Anglo-Persian War (1856–1857): Second British occupation of Bushehr; Part of Persian–Afghan Wars	Qajar Iran	United Kingdom: East India Company; Afghanistan	Defeat	Persian force occupies and later withdraws from Herat. Treaty of Paris (1857) is signed
Battle of Merv (1860–1862)	Qajar Iran	Turkmen tribes: Teke	Defeat	Turkmens raid the Khorasani Turkic region.
Herat campaign of 1862–1863: Part of Persian–Afghan Wars and campaigns of Dost Mohammad Khan	Emirate of Herat Herati Farsiwans Supported by: Qajar Iran	Emirate of Afghanistan Jamshidi tribesmen Supported by: British Empire East India Company	Defeat	Herat incorporated into the Emirate of Afghanistan
Uprising of Sheikh Ubeydullah (1879–1880)	Ottoman Empire Qajar Iran Supported by: Austria-Hungary: Austro-Hungarian military mission in Persia	Kurdish tribes	Victory	Successful repression
Tobacco Protest (1890–1891): Part of Great Game	Qajar Iran Limited support: British Empire	Iranian Protesters: Bazaari; Ulama (Mullah and Marja'); Limited support: Russian Empire	Defeat	Tobacco Régie is abolished.
Ottoman incursion into Persia (1905)	Sublime State of Persia	Ottoman Empire	Inconclusive	Increase of territorial conflicts between both empires
Persian Constitutional Revolution (1905–1911): Russian Invasion of Tabriz	Qajar Iran: Shahrbani; Shahsevan; Supported by: Russian Empire: Persian Cossack Brigade	Iranian constitutionalists: Parliament; Supported by: Ottoman Empire Armenian Revolutionary Federation in Iran	Revolutionaries victory	Constitutional monarchy and Parliament; Persian Constitution of 1906; Triumph of Tehran; Russian occupation of northern Iran until 1917
Ottoman invasion of Persia (1906)	Sublime State of Persia	Ottoman EmpireKurdish tribes	Defeat	Ottomans (with Kurdish allies) successfully invade Iranian Azerbaijan and Luristan, occupying Behik, Serdasht, Bani, Khanajin, Urmia, Gangachin, Mahabad, Khoy.
Revolt of Salar-al-Daulah (1911–1913)	Qajar Iran	Forces of Salar-al-Daulah	Victory	Rebellion suppressed
Swedish intervention in Persia (1911–1916): Shiraz expedition	Qajar Iran Sweden	Anti-Qajar insurgents	Victory	Anti-Qajar rebellions are suppressed.; The Swedish government quits in 1916 due to its neutrality on World War I. However, Swedes volunteers continued to serve in the Persian Gendarmerie until 1921.
Revolt of Mohammad Ali Shah Qajar (1911)	Sublime State of Persia	Forces of Mohammad Ali Shah Qajar Supported by: Russian Empire	Victory	The Shah is expelled against from the country.
Persian Campaign (1914–1918): Part of World War I	Qajar Iran: Qashqai tribesmen; Tangistani tribesmen; Laristani tribesmen; Jungle Movement	Entente Allies Russian Empire: Armenian volunteer units; British Empire: British Raj; Assyrian volunteers Central Powers Ottoman Empire: Shekak tribesmen; German Empire	Stalemate	Occupation of Iran by Anglo-Russian and Ottoman troops; Ottoman withdrawal after signing of Armistice of Mudros; Persian famine of 1917–1919
Jungle Movement insurrection on Gilan (1915–1921): Part of the Russian Revolution and the Russian Civil War	Qajar Iran: Persian Cossack Brigade; Russian Empire (1915–1917): White movement (since 1920); British Empire: North Persia Force	Jungle revolutionaries: Persian Socialist Soviet Republic; Supported by: Soviet Russia (since 1920): Soviet Caspian Flotilla	Victory	Revolt suppressed; Anglo-Soviet Trade Agreement forces the retreat of Bolsheviks from northern Iran.
Yarahmadzai uprising (1916–1934)	Qajar and Pahlavi Iran Supported by:British Empire: British Raj	Yarahmadzai tribe Supported by:German Empire (until 1918)	Victory	Balochistan is pacified and partitioned between Iran and British India.
Simko Shikak revolt (1918–1922): Lakestan incident; Part of Assyrian genocide and Kurdish separatism in Iran	Qajar and Pahlavi Iran Assyrian levies Assyrian volunteers	Irregular Kurdish militias Supported by: Ottoman Empire	Victory	Revolt suppressed
Azerbaijani separatism in Iran (1918–present)	Qajar and Pahlavi Iran Islamic Republic of Iran	Azerbaijani separatists Southern Azerbaijan National Awakening Movement Azerbaijan National Resistance Organization Azerbaijan Cultural Society Azerbaijan Diplomatic Mission Southern Azerbaijan Diplomatic Commission South Azerbaijan Independence Party South Azerbaijan National Liberation Movement Azerbaijan People's Government (1946) (Republic of Mahabad) Republic of Kurdistan(1946) Supported by: Soviet Union(until 1946) Azerbaijan (alleged by Iran) Turkey (alleged, sometimes) Nationalist Movement Party (alleged, sometimes) Israel (alleged by Iran)	Ongoing	Ongoing
Mohammad Khiabani's uprising (1920)	Qajar Iran: Persian Cossack Brigade	Mohammad Khiabani's forces Azerbaijan rebels	Victory	Revolt suppressed
Pessian's Khorasan Revolt (1921)	Qajar Iran: Irregular Kurdish militias; Persian Cossack Brigade	Autonomous Government of Khorasan: Khans of Khorasan	Victory	Revolt suppressed after the death of Mohammad Taqi Pessian
1921 Persian coup d'état (1921)	Qajar Iran Jangalis Simko Kurdish rebels Colonel Pesian's forces Supported by: Soviet Union	Persian Cossack Brigade; Supported by: United Kingdom	Defeat (Regime change)	Power takeover by Sayyed Ziaoddin Tabatabaee; Suppression of Colonel Pessian's revolt and dissolution of the Autonomous Government of Khorasan; Dissolution of the Republic of Gilan; Continuing conflict with Simko Shikak until 1922; Deterioration of Persian control over Sheikh Khazal's Emirate of Muhammara until 1925
Luri tribal insurgency in Pahlavi Iran (1921–1930)	Qajar and Pahlavi Iran	Luristan tribes Kurdish tribes	Victory	Luristan brought under direct Iranian state control
Sheikh Khazal rebellion (1922–1924)	Qajar and Pahlavi Iran	Sheikhdom of Mohammerah Bakhtiari tribesmen Arab separatists Supported by: United Kingdom	Victory	Rebellious Arab forces disbanded; Bakhtiaris defeated; Khazal arrested; Sheikhdom of Mohammerah abolished; Reza Khan re-established full control over the Emirate of Muhammara.
Turkoman Rebellion in Eastern Iran (1924–1926) (1924–1926)	(Iran) Sublime State of Persia loyalist Kurdish tribes: Quchan Kurds; Supported by: United Kingdom	Turkmen rebels rebel Kurdish tribes: Shadillu Kurds; Supported by: Soviet Union	Victory	Rebellion suppressed and Soviet plans to establish a Turkic protectorate are avoided.

== Pahlavi Iran ==
Conflict	Iran (and allies)	Opponents	Results	Notes
Pahlavi dynasty (1925–1979)
Simko Shikak revolt (1926)	Iran Assyrian volunteers Assyrian levies	Irregular Kurdish militias: Shikak tribesmen; Herki tribesmen; Begzadeh tribesmen	Victory	Revolt suppressed; Simko Shikak fled to Mandatory Iraq
Persian conquest of West Baluchistan (1928–1935): part of Yarahmadzai uprising	Iran	West Baluchistan	Victory	Iranian authority on West Bauchistan is reinforced-
Persian tribal uprisings of 1929 (1929–1933)	Iran	Rebel tribes: Qashqai; Khamseh; Buyir Ahmadi; Bakhtiari	Victory	Iranian government offered amnesties and most rebel leaders then surrendered. The rest received a peace agreement.
Jafar Sultan revolt (1931)	Iran	Jafar Sultan's Kurdish rebels	Victory	Revolt suppressed
Goharshad Mosque rebellion (1935)	Iran	Bazaaris Shia clergy	Victory	Iranian government impose the Kashf-e hijab and other anticlerical reforms against the Shias to Westernize Iran. Further de-Islamization and continuation of claims by the clergy about heretical innovations in the government.
Anglo-Soviet invasion of Iran (1941): Part of World War II	Iran Nazi Germany (Abwehr)	Soviet Union; United Kingdom: India; Australia	Defeat	Abdication of Rezā Shāh, Allied occupation of Iran and expulsion of German intelligence in Iran.
Hama Rashid revolt (1941–1944)	Iran	Kurdish tribesmen	Victory	Hama Rashid driven into Iraq
Operation François (1943): Part of World War II	Iran Supported by: Soviet Union; United Kingdom	Nazi Germany (Abwehr) Qashqai people	Victory	The Germans fail to instigate a nomadic rebellion in the Persian Corridor.
Khuzestan revolt (1943)	Iran	Khuzistan rebels Supported by: Arab nationalist	Victory	Revolt suppressed
Iran Crisis of 1946 (1945–1946): Part of Cold War	Iran Supported by: United States United Kingdom	Mahabad; Azerbaijan; Supported by: Soviet Union	Victory	Dissolution of Mahabad and Azerbaijan
Fada'iyan-e Islam's insurgency (1946–1965): Part of Terrorism in iran	House of Pahlavi Shia clergy lead by Ayatollah Hossein Borujerdi	Islamic fundamentalists: Fada'iyan-e Islam	Victory	The Shia Islamist group was suppressed and their leader Navab Safavi executed.
Abadan Crisis (1951–1954): Timeline of the Abadan Crisis; 1952 Iranian Uprising; 1953 Iranian coup d'état	Iranian State (Majlis) Supported by: Tudeh Party of Iran; National Front (Iran)	United Kingdom: British military network in Iran; Supported by: United States Iranian opposition: House of Pahlavi; Society of Muslim Warriors	Stalemate	Nationalization of the Iranian oil industry; Anglo-Iranian Oil Co. case rejected; Overthrow of Prime Minister Mohammad Mosaddegh; Nissho Maru Incident between Japan and United Kingdom
Syrian Crisis of 1957 (1957): Part of Cold War and Arab Cold War	Turkey United States Baghdad Pact: Iran; Kingdom of Iraq; Pakistan; United Kingdom	Syria Soviet Union Egypt	Stalemate	Turkey halts its Syrian border's operations after a compromise.; Syria and Egypt merges into the United Arab Republic as a measure to rid their governments of Communists the next year.; Hashemites in reaction stablished the Arab Federation between the Kingdom of Iraq and of Jordan.
First Iraqi–Kurdish War (1961–1970)	KDP Yazidis Assyrians Supported by: Iran Israel United States (alleged)	Before 1968: Republic of Iraq Syria (1963) After 1968: Ba'athist Iraq	Stalemate	Several Iraqi offensives intended to suppress the Kurdish rebellion fail.; Iraqi–Kurdish Autonomy Agreement of 1970; Arabization program continued
1962–1964 Tribal Rebellion of Fars (1962–1964)	Iran	Qashqai Tribes; Boyr Ahmad tribes	Victory	Tribal revolt is suppressed.
1963 demonstrations in Iran (1963)	Iran	Islamic Coalition; Freedom Movement	Victory	Shia revolt is suppressed. Ruhollah Khomeini is released but exiled.
1967 Kurdish revolt in Iran (1967)	Iran	Revolutionary Committee leadership: KDP-I	Victory	Kurdish revolt suppressed:
Insurgency in Balochistan (1948–present): Sistan and Baluchestan insurgency	Pakistan Forces involved: Pakistan Armed Forces; Pakistan Army (until 2008, again from 2024); Pakistan Air Force; Pakistan Navy; Special Forces: SSG; SSW; SSG-N; Pakistan Marines; Civil Armed Forces; Frontier Corps; Frontier Corps Balochistan (North); Frontier Corps Balochistan (South); Pakistan Coast Guards; Pakistan Levies; Frontier Constabulary; Pakistan Police; Balochistan Police; Counter Terrorism Department; Balochistan Levies; Pakistani Intelligence community; NACTA; ISI; MI; FIA; Iran Forces involved: Iranian Armed Forces; Artesh (since 1979); Ground Forces; Air Force; Navy; Special forces: NOHED Brigade; 3rd Marine Brigade; IRGC (since 1980); Ground Forces; Aerospace Force; Navy; Basij; Special forces: Saberin Takavar Brigade; 110th Salman Farsi Special Operations Brigade; Sepah Navy Special Force; Iranian police; Border Guard (since 2000); Ministry of Intelligence; Imperial Iranian Army (until 1979)	Baloch separatist factions: BLA; Majeed Brigade; Fateh Squad; BLF; Baloch Raaji Aajoi Sangar; LeB (inactive); BLUF (2009–2010); BSO (Azad) (inactive); BNA (2022–2023); BRA (2006–2022); UBA (2013–2022); Other Baloch Separatist groups; Sectarian factions: Ansar Al-Furqan (since 2013); Jaysh al-Adl (since 2012); Harakat Ansar (2012–13); Hizbul-Furqan (2012–13); Jundallah (2003–12); Islamic State (since 2014); IS-KP (since 2015); IS-PP (since 2019); Tehrik-i-Taliban Pakistan (since 2007); Lashkar-e-Jhangvi (1996–2024); Sipah-e-Sahaba (1985–2018); Supported by: India (to Baloch Nationalists only); Afghanistan (alleged, denied)	Ongoing	Ongoing: Extension of the conflict into Iran; Operation Azm-e-Istehkam continuous; Low-level insurgency intensifies
Dhofar Rebellion (1963–1979): Part of the Cold War and the Arab Cold War	Iran (since 1973); Oman United Kingdom Jordan	PFLOAG; PFLO South Yemen	Victory	Defeat of insurgents, modernization of Oman
Joint Operation Arvand (1969)	Iran	Ba'athist Iraq	Victory	Tactical victory without combat. Tensions continued between the two countries until 1975 Algiers Agreement.
Siahkal incident (1971)	Imperial State of Iran	Organization of Iranian People's Fedai Guerrillas	Defeat	Revolt suppressed by Pahlavi Iran.
Seizure of Abu Musa and the Greater and Lesser Tunbs (1971): Part of Unification of the United Arab Emirates	Iran	Emirate of Sharjah; Emirate of Ras al-Khaimah	Victory	Iran captures Abu Musa and the Greater and Lesser Tunbs, which started a territorial dispute.; Sharjah and Ras Al Khaimah join the United Arab Emirates.
Second Iraqi–Kurdish War (1974–1975)	KDP Yazidis Iran Supported by: Israel United States	Iraq Supported by: Soviet Union	Defeat	Peshmerga fighting ability destroyed; Iran withdrew its support for KDP
Arvand Conflict (1974–1975): Part of the Shatt al-Arab dispute and the Second Iraqi–Kurdish War	Iran KDP	Iraq	Victory	1975 Algiers Agreement; Iran consolidates control over the Shatt al-Arab/Arvand Rud waterway; Tensions between Iran and Iraq over the disputed waterway and border escalate into a full-scale war in 1980
Panjshir Valley uprising (1975): Part of Afghanistan–Pakistan border skirmishes	Jamiat-e Islami; Pakistan; ISI Supported by: Iran; SAVAK	Afghan government	Defeat	End of the 1975 uprisings in Afghanistan

== See also ==
- List of wars involving Iran
- History of Iran
- History of the central steppe
- Military history of Iran
- Iranian expansionism
- Cyrus in Babylon and the Jewish connection
- List of massacres in Iran
- Greco-Persian Wars
- Roman–Persian Wars
- Parthian army
- Military of the Sasanian Empire
- List of Sasanian revolts and civil wars
- Göktürk–Persian wars
- Hephthalite–Persian Wars
- Aksumite–Persian wars
- Military of Safavid Iran
- Persian–Uzbek wars
- Ottoman–Persian Wars
- Persian–Afghan Wars
- Military of Afsharid Iran
- Mughal–Persian Wars
- Russo-Persian Wars
- Swedish intervention in Persia
- Persian Corridor (a.k.a. Anglo-Soviet invasion of Iran)
- Consolidation of the Iranian Revolution (1979–1982/83)
- Kurdish separatism in Iran
