= Patigrabana =

Patigrabana was a historical city in Parthia. It is known of only from the Behistun Inscription.

According to that text, Patigrabana is where Hystaspes – father of Darius I and Achaemenid governor of Parthia – fought a battle against Parthian and Hyrcanian rebels supporting one Phraortes (not to be confused with the earlier Median emperor of the same name) around 520 BC. Hystaspes had earlier fought a battle against them at Vishpauzati. He was reinforced by Achaemenid troops from Rhagae, then attacked and defeated the rebels at Patigrabana and secured Parthia for Darius.

Its name means "place where goods are collected," and the city may have been located at the present-day site of Mashhad.
