= Battle of Muş (1387) =

- Part of Timurid invasions of Azerbaijan
Location	Muş, Turkey
Result	Qara Qoyunlu victory

Belligerents
Qara Qoyunlu	Timurid Empire

Commanders and leaders
Qara Muhammad; Qara Yusuf; Yar Ali; Pir Omar	Jahanshah Bahadur (WIA); Shah Malik †; Amir Muhammad; Aqbalshah; Sheikh Ali Bahadur; Amir Mirek

Strength
12,000	Unknown but more

Casualties and losses
Unknown	Heavy

The Battle of Muş was a clash in 1387 between a large army sent by Amir Timur following the Battle of Çapakçur (1387), and the forces of Qara Muhammad and his son Qara Yusuf of the Qara Qoyunlu.

== Prelude ==
In 1386, Amir Timur had conquered much of Iran and was advancing west. The Qara Qoyunlu refused to submit to the Timurids. Timur accused the Qara Qoyunlu of attacking and looting a Hajj caravan, using it as justification to launch an invasion. Departing from Nakhchivan in 1387, Timur's forces first captured the fortress of Bayazid (also known as Aydın Castle). He then approached the fortress of Avnik, held by Mısırlı Hoca, son of Qara Muhammad. Unable to take the formidable fortress, Timur encamped near the Çapakçur River and dispatched three wings of his army under his son Miran Shah, Muhammad Mirek, Sheikh Ali, Iqbalshah, and Tilek Kavçin. Qara Muhammad, along with his son Qara Yusuf, withdrew to narrow mountain passes and ambushed the Timurid forces, inflicting heavy losses.

== Battle ==
Qara Qoyunlu historian Abu’l-Muzzi Hamadani recounts: Timur appointed the brave and renowned general Jahanshah Bahadur to lead his forces. When Qara Muhammad received this news, he gathered his emirs and commanders and declared:

Timur seeks revenge for the many losses he suffered. Now he has sent a mighty army. If we show weakness, disaster will follow. I cannot reconcile with Timur. It is better to fight with courage and let fate decide.

His commanders replied:

Our hearts are with you. We devote our lives to the noble Amir Qara Muhammad!

Jahanshah Bahadur led his army toward Qara Yusuf's forces. Qara Yusuf skillfully divided his troops into four wings. These began launching volleys of arrows (referred to as Kiyāni bows and Hadhang arrows). Each arrow felled a Timurid soldier. Qara Yusuf suddenly charged the Timurid army, further disorienting them. The Timurid ranks collapsed under this coordinated assault. Jahanshah, seeing many of his soldiers wounded, fled the battlefield.

== Aftermath ==
Jahanshah managed to escape and report to Amir Timur. Enraged, Timur personally led another campaign against the Qara Qoyunlu. According to Qara Qoyunlu chronicles, Qara Muhammad lacked the manpower to resist Timur but still chose to fight, retreating into narrow gorges to evade the superior Timurid forces.

== See also ==
- Qara Qoyunlu
- Qara Yusuf
- Amir Timur
