= Scythian conquest of the Cimmerians =

Date	7th century BCE
Location	Black Sea Steppe
Result	Scythian victory: Cimmerians retreat into West Asia; Defeat of Medes by Scythians

Belligerents
Scythians	Cimmerians Medes (during the retreat of Cimmerians into West Asia)

Commanders and leaders
Madyes	Unknown

Scythian conquest of the Cimmerians was the conflict between Cimmerians inhabiting the Black Sea steppes, and Scythians who were at the time, migrating into those lands. The conflict resulted in the Cimmerians escaping into Caucausus, and then West Asia from Scythians.

== Background ==
The Cimmerians have inhabited the Black Sea Steppe before the Scythians, from the 1st millennium BC to the 1st millennium AD. The scythians were a nomadic tribe that kept migrating westwards into the Pontic Steppe.

== Conquest ==
The Scythians arrived in the Black Sea Steppe in 7th century BCE, and started the process of expulsion of Cimmerians from their lands. They were victorious in their campaigns, forcing the Cimmerians out of the Steppe and forcing them to escape to the Caucasus, where the Scythian king, Madyes would follow them further, forcing them to escape into West Asia. After the arrival in West Asia, the Scythians focused on defeating nearby Medes which has also been successful.

The Cimmerian retreat into West Asia followed the shores of the Black Sea into Asia Minor, in which the Cimmerians decided to stay after the Scythians turned their focus on Medians
