= List of monarchs of Iran =

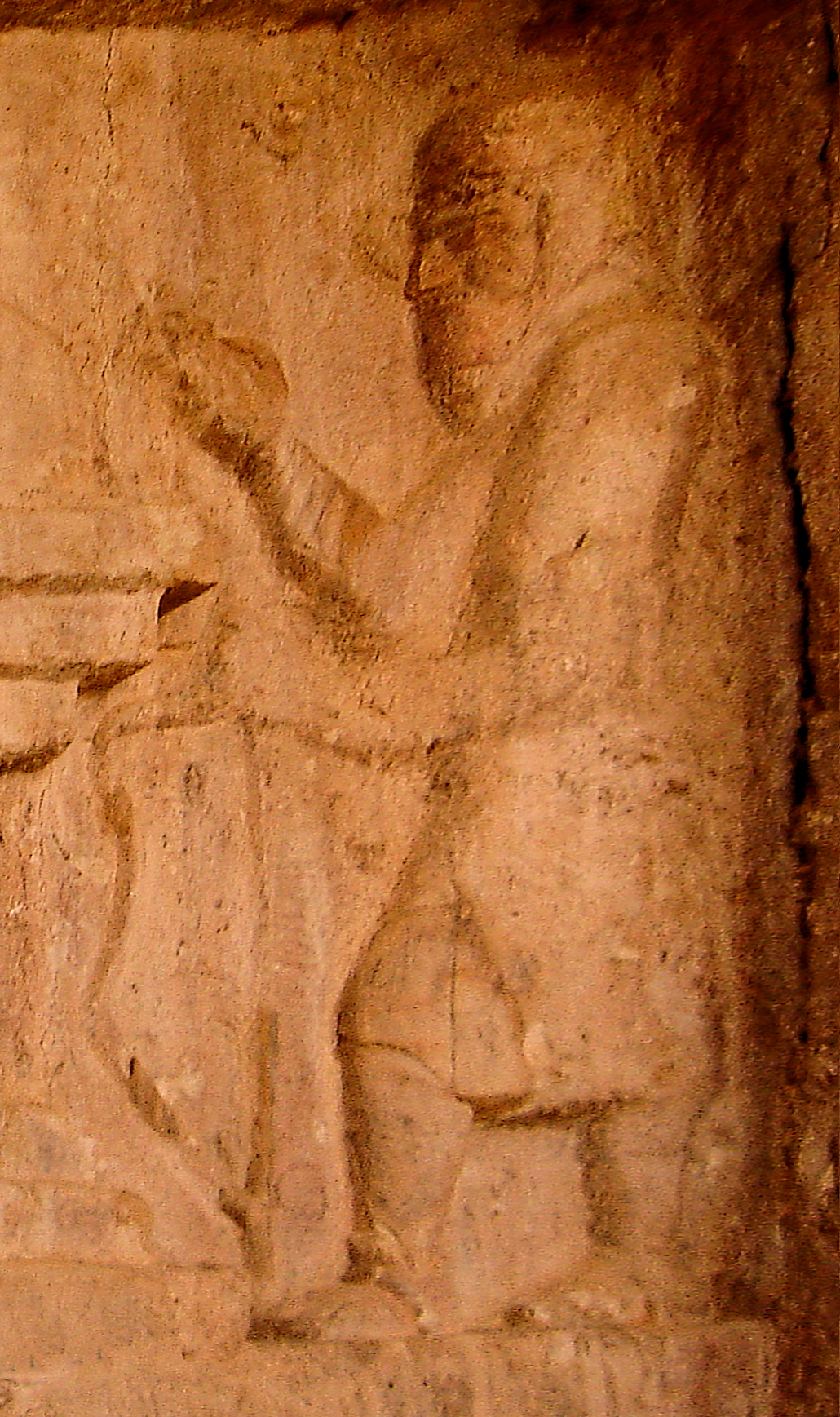
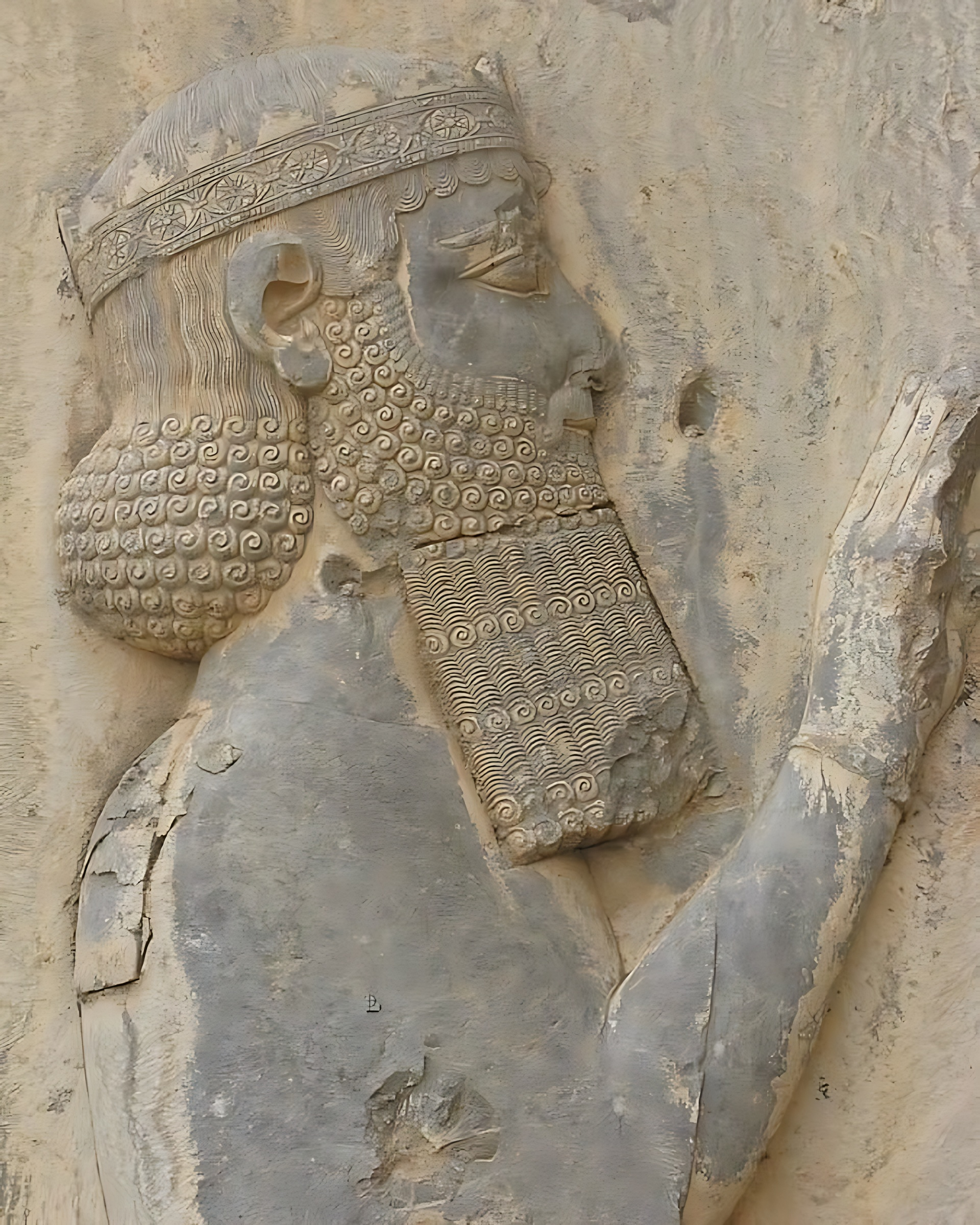
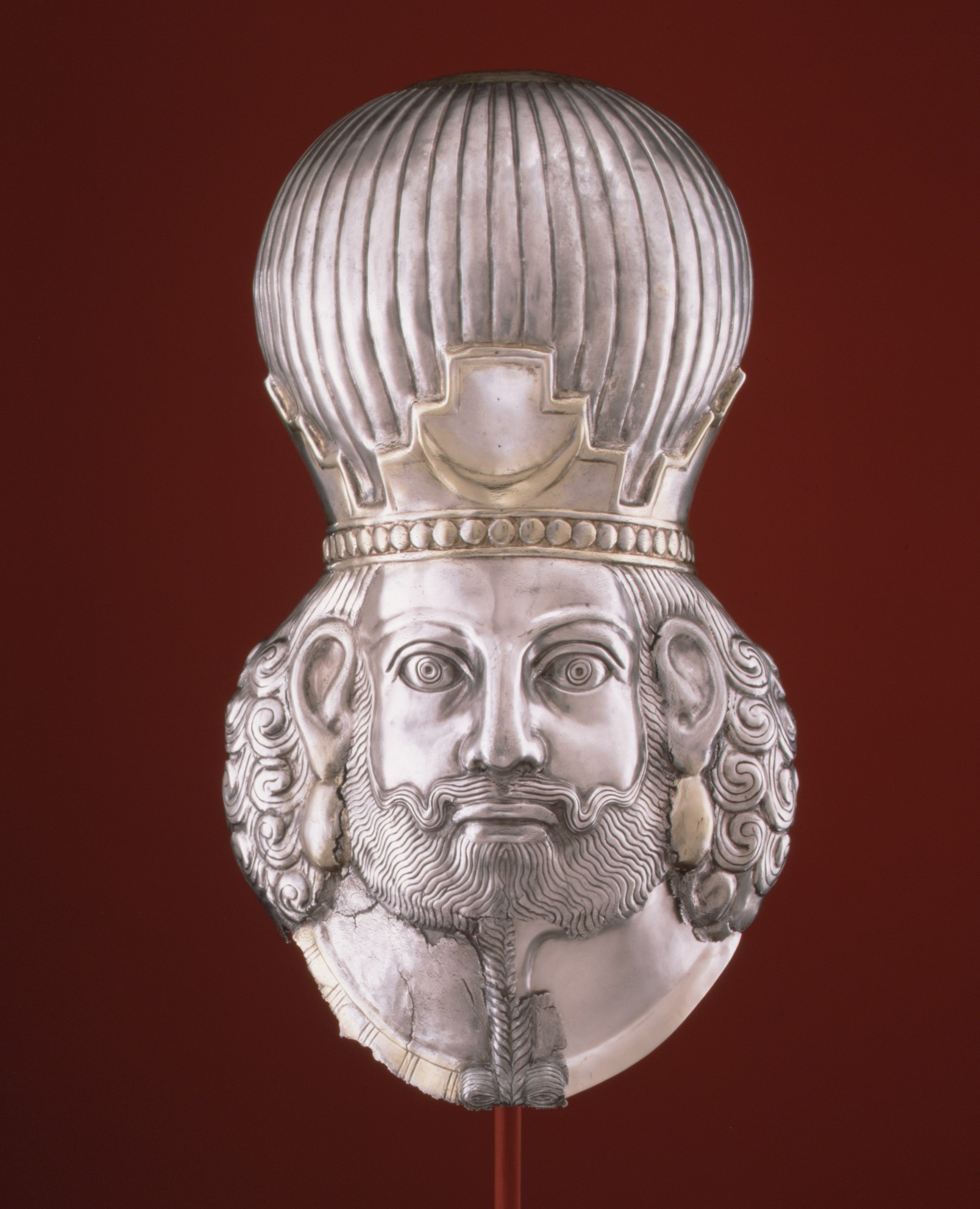
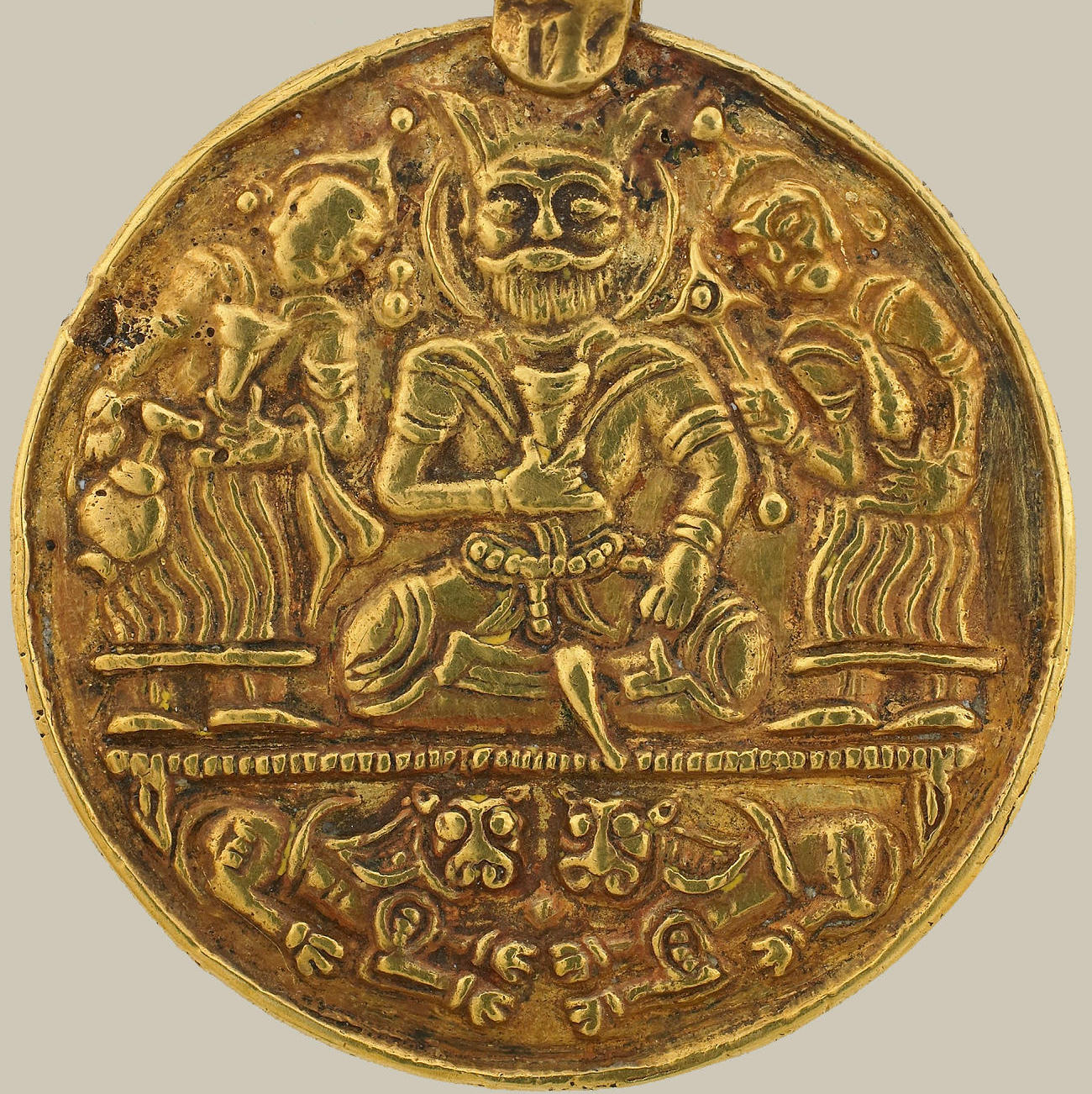
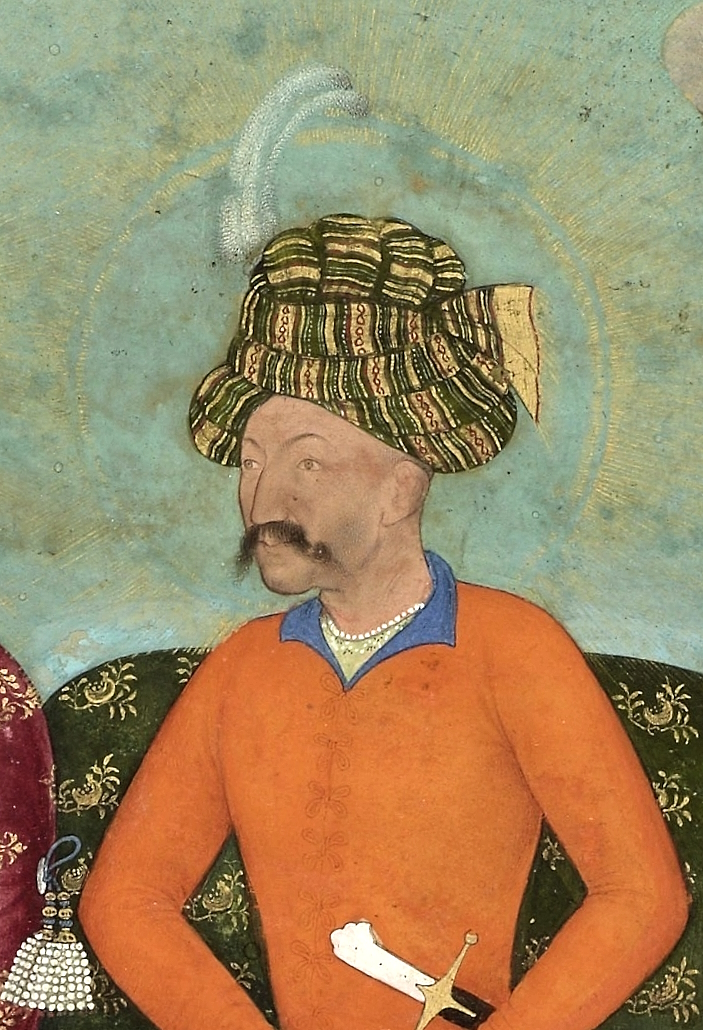
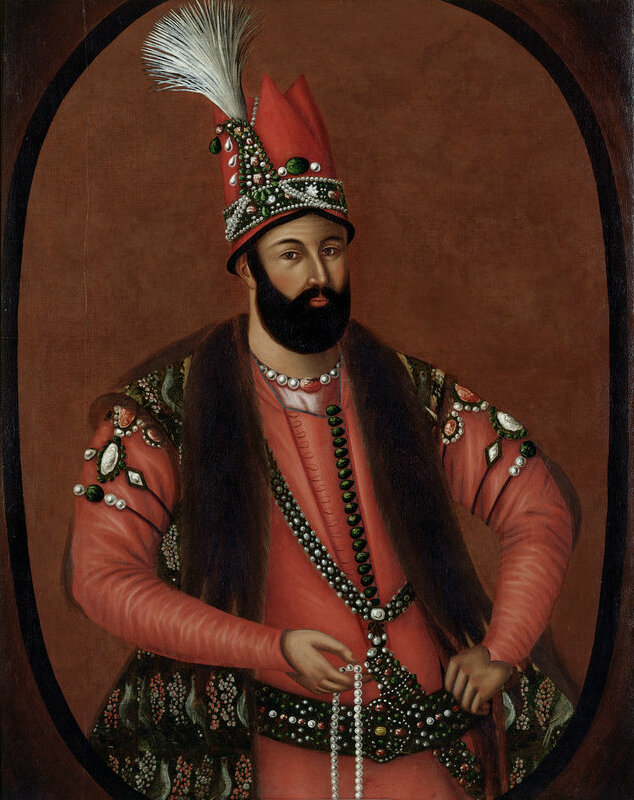
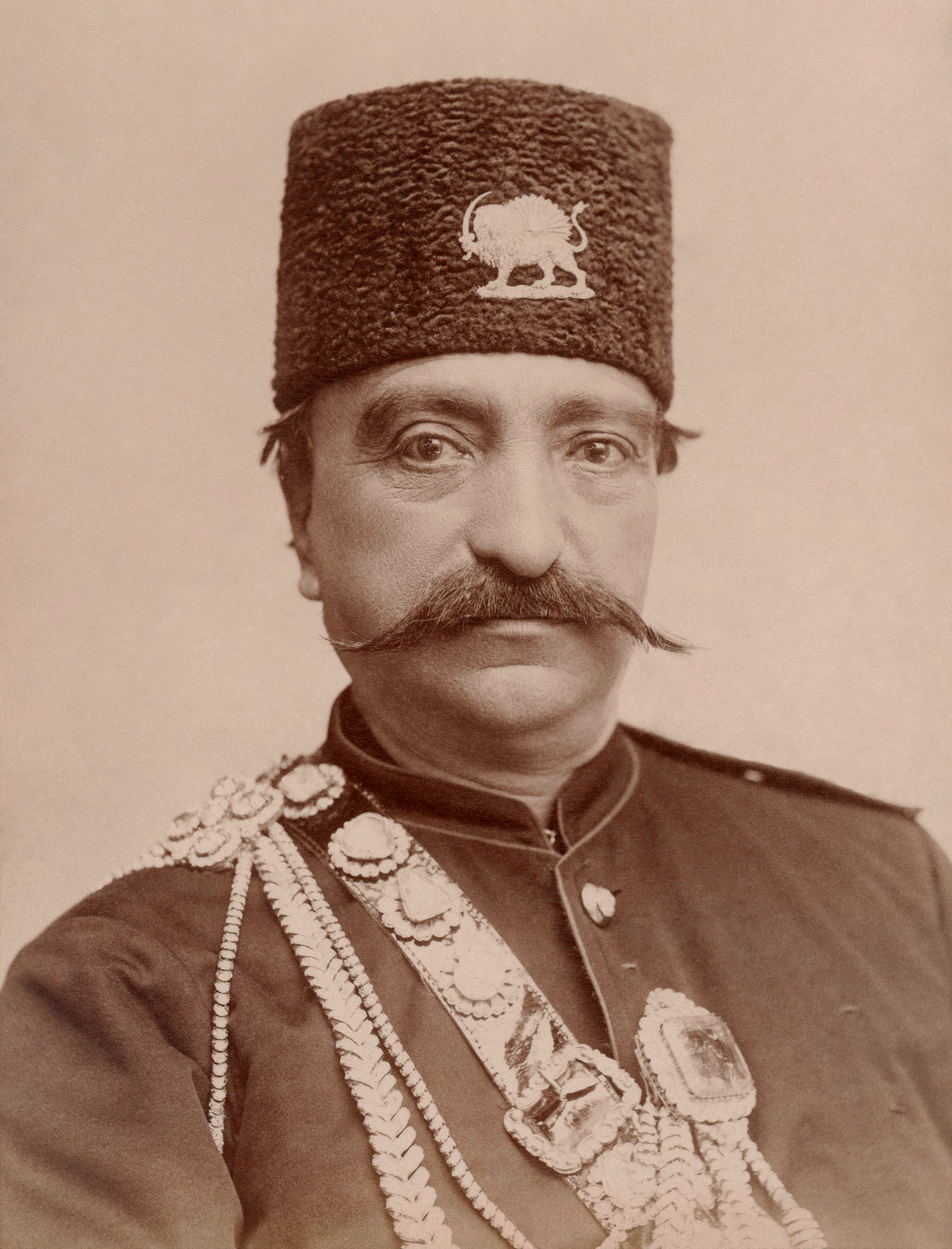
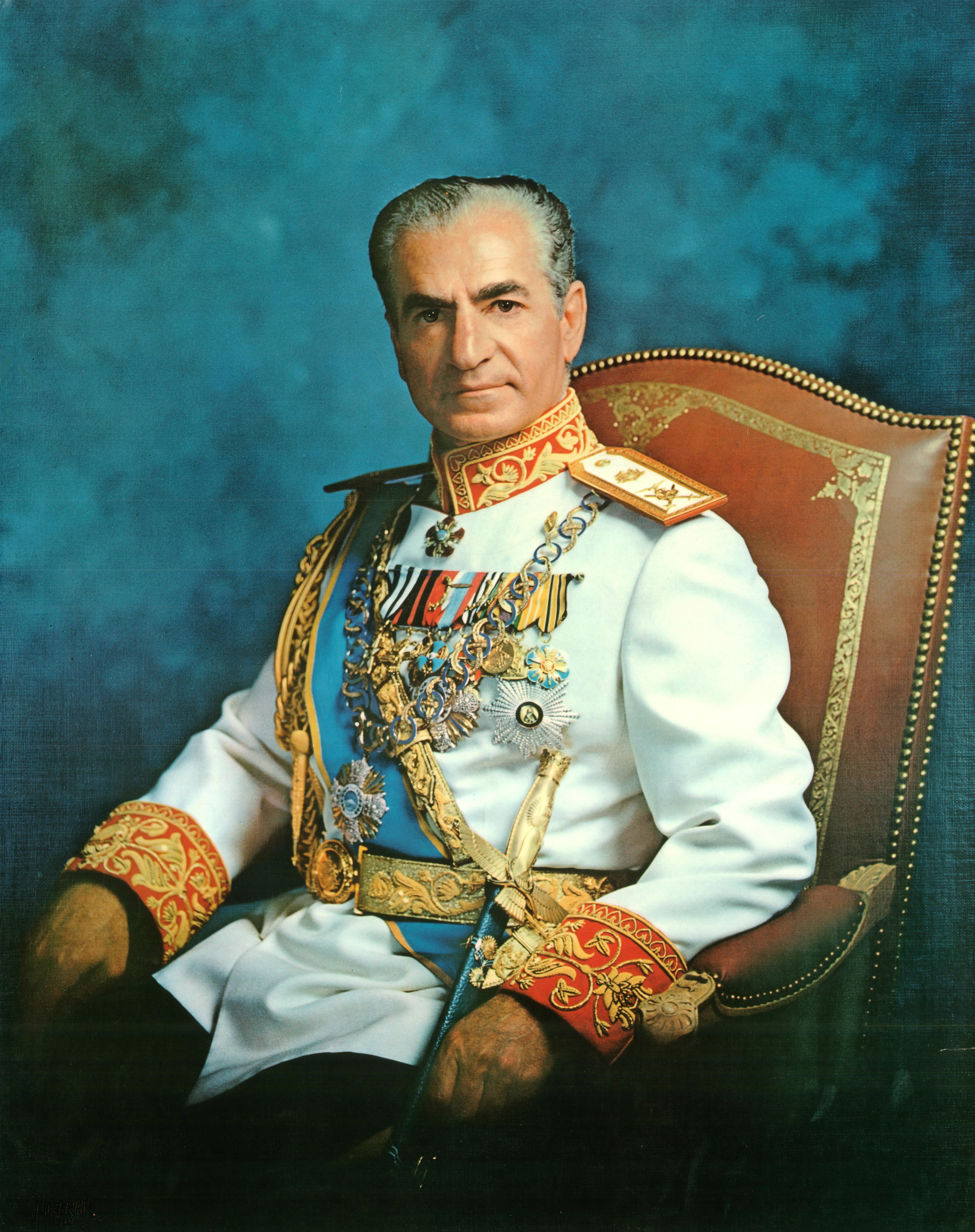
From top; left to right: Cyaxares, Darius I, Mithridates I, Shapur II, 'Adud al-Dawla, Abbas I, Nader Shah, Naser al-Din Shah Qajar, Mohammad Reza Pahlavi

The monarchs of Iran (Note: With regard to the name of Iran: "Persia" was an exonym used by the ancient Greeks to refer to the Achaemenid Empire, derived from the Persians (the Iranian ethnic group to which the Achaemenid dynasty belonged). Consequently, "Persia" was the word commonly used in the Western world to refer to Iran and its people, regardless of their ethnicity. "Iran" (Persian: ایران) is the country's endonym, first attested under the Sasanian Empire, though earlier forms of the name (see Aryan and Arya) date back to the Proto-Indo-Iranian people and had been used ever since. In 1935, the Iranian king Reza Shah requested that foreign delegates begin using "Iran" rather than "Persia" in formal correspondence, whereafter "Iran" has also become the common name used in the Western world and internationally.) ruled for over two and a half millennia, beginning as early as the 8th century BC and enduring until the 20th century AD. The earliest Iranian monarch is generally considered to have been either Deioces of the Median dynasty (c. 727–550 BC) or Cyrus the Great of the Achaemenid dynasty (550–330 BC). The last Iranian monarch was Mohammad Reza Shah of the Pahlavi dynasty (1925–1979), who was overthrown in the Iranian Revolution. Since then, Iran has been governed by theocratic supreme leaders.

In classical antiquity, Iran reached the peak of its power and prestige under the Achaemenid Empire, which stretched from Egypt and parts of Southeast Europe in the west to the Indus Valley and parts of Central Asia in the east. By 323 BC, the Achaemenid Empire's territories had been conquered by the Macedonian Empire during the Wars of Alexander the Great, bringing Iran into the Hellenistic sphere. In the Wars of the Diadochi, the Seleucid Empire (305–129 BC) assumed control of Iran. Native Iranian rule was revived with the expansion of Parthian Empire (247 BC–224 AD) in the Seleucid–Parthian Wars. The Parthians were succeeded by the Sasanian Empire (224–651), which oversaw a golden age in the history of Iranian civilization and existed until the Arab conquest of Iran.

Medieval Iran alternated between being ruled by large foreign empires and being divided into several smaller kingdoms. Most of the Sasanian lands were annexed by the Rashidun Caliphate (638–661), which was succeeded by the Umayyad Caliphate (661–750) and then by the Abbasid Caliphate (749–861). Under the Abbasids, many Iranian figures took part in shaping the Islamic Golden Age, while also leveraging the decline of Arab power to establish independent dynasties and kingdoms – those including the Saffarids (867–1002), Samanids (875–999), Ziyarids (927–1090/1091) and Buyids (934–1062) – thus allowing their native languages to flourish and reviving Sasanian royal iconography and ideology in what became known as the Iranian Intermezzo. In the 11th century, Iran was conquered by the Seljuk Empire (1038–1194), which was Turkic in origin, but culturally Persianate. Further conquests by entities coming from Central Asia occurred over the course of the next five centuries, most notably including the Turkic Khwarazmian Empire (1097–1220/1221), the Mongol Empire (1220–1259), the post-Mongol Ilkhanate (1256–1335), and the Turco-Mongol Timurid Empire (1370–1458). Most of the Timurid territory in Iran was later conquered by the Qara Qoyunlu (1452–1469), followed by the Aq Qoyunlu (1465–1508), both are Turkic tribal confederations.

The year 1501 is considered the beginning of modern Iranian history, as the Safavid dynasty (1501–1736) rose to power and oversaw the conversion of Iran to Shia Islam, marking the region's largest religious shift since the Arab conquest. The collapse of the Safavids led to an intermediate period of turmoil, with rule of Iran contested between Safavid dynasts as well as the Afghan-origin Hotak dynasty (1722–1729). Nader Shah replaced these with the Afsharid Empire (1736–1796), but after his assassination in 1747, the Afsharids competed with the Zand dynasty (1751–1794) under Karim Khan Zand and his successors for supremacy. Iran was eventually reunified by the Qajar dynasty (1789–1925), which was succeeded by the Pahlavi dynasty of Reza Shah. The Pahlavi dynasty was the last to reign before the Iranian monarchy was abolished in 1979.

== Ancient Iran (c. 727 BC–AD 651) ==
=== Medes (c. 727–550 BC) ===
The Median Empire according to Herodotus

The Median dynasty is traditionally considered to have ruled the earliest Iranian state. Whether the Medes ruled an imperial state or merely a loose tribal confederation is disputed among historians. Median history is reconstructed almost solely through ancient Greek sources (particularly Herodotus) and disregards Near Eastern sources, which are fragmentary and do not support the existence of a unified Median Empire. There is also no material or textual evidence left behind by the supposed empire itself. (Note: There is no archaeological evidence of any Median imperial centers, no documentary archives from Median administrations, and no contemporary correspondence between foreign kings and Median rulers.) The chronology and names of the Median kings mainly derives from the work of Herodotus. (Note: Ctesias, another ancient Greek historian, also wrote a list of Median rulers though it differs entirely from that of Herodotus except for the name of the last king (Astyages).)

No ruling title is securely attested for the Median rulers. They might have used xšāyaθiya xšāyaθiyānām ("King of Kings"), later used by the Achaemenids. Ecbatana was the Median capital.

Portrait	Name	Reign	Succession
—	Deioces	c. 727–675 BC (c. 52 years)	First king of the Medes according to Herodotus. Perhaps elected by popular assembly.
—	Phraortes	c. 674–653 BC (c. 21 years)	Son of Deioces
Interregnum c. 652 – 625 BC. The Medes were invaded by Scythians, perhaps under a ruler named Madyes, who established some form of hegemony. The Scythian rulers were defeated by Cyaxares after about three decades, restoring the Medes to their previous power.
	Cyaxares	c. 624–585 BC (c. 39 years)	Son of Phraortes
—	Astyages	c. 584–550 BC (c. 34 years)	Son of Cyaxares

Later pretenders (521 BC)
Portrait	Name	Tenure	Succession
	Phraortes II	521 BC (less than a year)	Rebel in Media against Darius I of the Achaemenid Empire. Claimed kinship with Cyaxares.
	Tritantaechmes	521 BC (less than a year)	Rebel in Sagartia against Darius I of the Achaemenid Empire. Claimed kinship with Cyaxares.

=== Achaemenid Empire (550–330 BC) ===
The Achaemenid Empire under Darius the Great

The Achaemenid dynasty originated as local rulers of Anshan under Median suzerainty. They are attributed various ancestors in later legends, including an eponymous figure called "Achaemenes". The earliest securely historical Achaemenid ruler is Cyrus I, king of Anshan in the second half of the seventh century BC. The Achaemenids united all Persian tribes under Cyrus I's son Cambyses I. Under Cambyses I's son, Cyrus II, the Achaemenids defeated the Medes and established the Achaemenid Empire, the largest ever Iranian state.

The standard title used by Achaemenid rulers in Iran from Cyrus II onwards was xšāyaθiya xšāyaθiyānām, xšāyaθiya dahyūnām (lit. 'King of Kings, King of the Lands'). The royal title varied in other parts of the empire. (Note: In Babylonia, the standard title up until the reign of Xerxes I was 'King of Babylon, King of the Lands'. In more elaborate contexts, the royal style could be augmented with additional titles, such as "the Great King" and "King in Persia". The Achaemenid king was referred to as "the Great King" by the Greeks and as the "Lord of Kings" by the Phoenicians.) The Achaemenids had several royal cities, including Pasargadae, Susa, Ecbatana, Babylon, Bactra, and Persepolis.

Early local rulers in Anshan (c. 620–550 BC)
Portrait	Name	Reign	Succession
	Cyrus I	c. 620–590 BC (c. 30 years)	Earliest historical Achaemenid ruler
—	Cambyses I	c. 590–559 BC (c. 31 years)	Son of Cyrus I
	Cyrus II	c. 559–550 BC (c. 9 years)	Son of Cambyses I

Portrait	Name	Reign	Succession
	Cyrus II the Great	c. 550 – November (?) 530 BC (c. 20 years)	Defeated Astyages and captured Ecbatana c. 550 BC. Married Amytis, daughter of Astyages, according to ancient Greek historians.
	Cambyses II	August 530 – July 522 BC (7 years and 10 or 11 months)	Son of Cyrus II
	Bardiya	1 July – 29 September 522 BC (2 months and 28 days)	Son of Cyrus II (possibly an impostor). Revolted against Cambyses on 11 March 522 BC and proclaimed himself ruler on 1 July.
	Darius I the Great	29 September 522 – October 486 BC (36 years and 0 or 1 month)	Claimed descent from Teispes (supposed father of Cyrus I). Seized the throne from Bardiya.
	Xerxes I the Great	October 486 – August 465 BC (20 years and 9 or 10 months)	Son of Darius I and Atossa (daughter of Cyrus II)
	Artaxerxes I Longimanus	August 465 – c. December 424 BC (41 years and c. 4 months)	Son of Xerxes I
	Xerxes II	c. December 424 – c. January 423 BC (45 days)	Son of Artaxerxes I
	Sogdianus	c. January – February 423 BC (c. 1 month)	Illegitimate son of Artaxerxes I. Seized the throne from Xerxes II.
	Darius II (Ochus)	February 423 – March 404 BC (19 years and 0 or 1 month)	Illegitimate son of Artaxerxes I. Seized the throne from Sogdianus.
	Artaxerxes II (Arsakes)	March 404 – spring (?) 358 BC (46 years)	Son of Darius II
	Artaxerxes III (Ochus)	Spring (?) 358 – September (?) 338 BC (20 years)	Son of Artaxerxes II
	Artaxerxes IV (Arses)	September (?) 338 – June 336 BC (2 years)	Son of Artaxerxes III
	Darius III (Artashata)	June 336 – July 330 BC (6 years)	Grandson of Artaxerxes II

Later pretenders (330–329 BC)
Portrait	Name	Tenure	Succession
	Artaxerxes V (Bessus)	July 330 – spring 329 BC (less than a year)	Satrap of Bactria, part of the Achaemenid dynasty. Murdered Darius III and proclaimed himself as his successor, ruling several eastern satrapies in opposition to Alexander the Great.

=== Hellenistic rule (331–129 BC) ===
==== Alexander's empire (331–305 BC) ====
Alexander the Great's empire

The Achaemenid Empire was defeated and conquered by Alexander the Great, king of the ancient Greek kingdom of Macedonia, in 331–329 BC. After Alexander's death in 323 BC, the Wars of the Diadochi broke out between his successors, leading to the rapid disintegration of the empire.

Alexander did not assume the former Achaemenid royal title of 'King of Kings'. His main royal title, appearing on coins intended for his Asian territories, was instead basileus (lit. 'king'). To mark his rule over the Achaemenid territories he also sometimes used the new title "Lord of Asia" (sometimes "King of Asia"). The only royal title recorded for Alexander's two immediate heirs is basileus. Alexander ruled his empire from Babylon and planned to establish Babylon and Alexandria in Egypt as the twin imperial capitals. From 319 BC onwards, Alexander's heirs resided in Macedonia while the regency in Asia was contested by several generals.

Portrait	Name	Reign	Succession
	Alexander (Note: Enumerated as Alexander III as king of Macedon (after Alexander I and Alexander II).) the Great	1 October 331 (Note: The date of Alexander's victory at the Battle of Gaugamela, which opened the way for his conquest of Babylonia and Persia.) – 10/11 June 323 BC (7 years, 8 months and 10/11 days)	Conquered the Achaemenid Empire
	Philip Arrhidaeus (Note: Enumerated as Philip III as king of Macedon (after Philip I and Philip II).)	June 323 – late 317 BC (6 years)	Brother of Alexander the Great
	Alexander Aegus (Note: Enumerated as Alexander IV as king of Macedon (after Alexander I, Alexander II, and Alexander the Great).)	August 323 – 311/304 BC (Note: There is confusion regarding Alexander IV's death year. It was long believed he was killed c. 310 BC, however, he continued to be recognized as the sovereign is some parts of the Empire until 304 BC, which may suggest he lived until that year or was posthumously treated as reigning monarch in the absence of a direct heir.) (14/18 years)	Son of Alexander the Great

==== Seleucid Empire (305–129 BC) ====
The Seleucid Empire under Seleucus I Nicator

The main Hellenistic successors of Alexander's empire in Iran were the Seleucids, descendants of the Macedonian general Seleucus I Nicator and the Iranian noblewoman Apama. Seleucus seized most of the east, including Babylonia, in the Wars of the Diadochi and was firmly in control in the region from 312 BC onwards. After Alexander IV's death became public knowledge in 305 BC, Seleucus proclaimed himself king.

The main royal title used by the Seleucids was basileus, as was the case for the other Macedonian successor kingdoms (such as the Ptolemaic Kingdom). Only two Seleucid rulers (Antiochus III, 223–187 BC, and Antiochus VII, 139–129 BC) used the greater megas basileus ('Great King'), the style applied to Achaemenid kings in ancient Greek sources. The Seleucids at first ruled from Seleucia in Mesopotamia, though Antioch was soon made the main capital.

Portrait	Name	Reign	Succession
	Seleucus I Nicator	305 – September 280 BC (25 years)	Former general under Alexander the Great. Held most of the east of his empire from 312 BC onwards and proclaimed king in 305 BC.
	Antiochus I Soter	September 280 – 261 BC (19 years)	Son of Seleucus I
	Antiochus II; Theos	261–246 BC (15 years)	Son of Antiochus I
	Seleucus II; Callinicus	246–226 BC (20 years)	Son of Antiochus II
	Seleucus III; Ceraunus	226–223 BC (3 years)	Sons of Seleucus II
	Antiochus III the Great	223–187 BC (36 years)	Sons of Seleucus II
	Seleucus IV; Philopator	187–175 BC (12 years)	Sons of Antiochus III
	Antiochus IV; Epiphanes	175 – late 164 BC (11 years)	Sons of Antiochus III
	Antiochus V Eupator	Late 164 – 162 BC (2 years)	Son of Antiochus IV
	Demetrius I Soter	162–150 BC (12 years)	Son of Seleucus IV. Overthrew Antiochus IV.
	Alexander; Balas	152–145 BC (7 years)	Alleged son of Antiochus IV. Rival king against Demetrius I, supported by the Roman Empire.
	Antiochus VI; Dionysus	145–142 BC (3 years)	Son of Alexander Balas
	Demetrius II; Nicator	147–139 BC (8 years)	Son of Demetrius I. Revolted against Alexander Balas with support from the Ptolemaic Kingdom. Sole king after Antiochus VI's death.
	Antiochus VII; Sidetes	139–129 BC (10 years)	Son of Demetrius I

=== Parthian Empire (c. 250/247 BC–224 AD) ===
The Parthian Empire under Mithridates II

The Arsacids of Parthia, initially Seleucid vassals, originated as leaders of the eastern Iranian (Note: Yarshater 2004, pp. 212–224: "The Arsacids (q.v.) came from a Saka tribe, the Aparni (see APARNA), who penetrated Parthia, adopted its language, and eventually challenged the Seleucids when the Arsacid eponymous king Arsaces (Aršak) challenged the Seleucids’ power in Parthia in 247 B.C.E."; Katouzian 2009, p. 41: "In 247 BC two brothers of Iranian Scythian origin dislodged the Seleucids in the north-east of their empire shortly after the Bactrian Greeks had declared independence from them. Arsaces (Arshak; Ashk) was a chief of the Parni tribe, one of the great Scythian (Saka) Dahae nomads from the region between the Caspian and Aral Seas.") Parni tribe in the northeastern steppes. The Parthians gradually challenged Seleucid rule over Iran. Parthian control of Iran was secured through the c. 142 BC conquest of Babylonia. Although fighting continued for years, the death of Antiochus VII Sidetes in 129 BC effectively marked the collapse of the Seleucid Empire, which then lingered on as a rump state in Syria until conquered by the Roman Empire in the 60s BC.

The Parthians presented themselves as heirs of the Achaemenids, though ruled a much more decentralized state. Greek inscriptions were used on Parthian coins until the time of Vologases I (AD 51–78). Early Parthian rulers used the name of their dynastic founder (Arsaces) as a title. Their coins also have the legend krny (probably short for autokrator, i.e. autocrat or sole ruler). From the conquest of Babylonia onwards, rulers used basileus megas (lit. 'Great King'). Mithridates II (123–91 BC) adopted the Achaemenid 'King of Kings' (rendered in Greek as basileus basileon). After him, this title was used only by Mithridates IV (57–54 BC) and Orodes II (57–37 BC) before becoming a standard part of the Parthian title from the time of Phraates IV (26–2 BC) onwards. The title was used in its Persian form (šāhān šāh) after Greek ceased being used. The first Parthian capital was at Nisa in Parthia. In 217 BC, the capital was moved to Qumis and in 50 BC a multi-capital system was established, with royal residences at Ctesiphon, Ecbatana, and Ray.

This list omits rival kings and claimants. Because of poor source material there are alternate chronologies, genealogies, and enumerations of Parthian rulers, with some differences. See the list of monarchs of Parthia.

Early local rulers in Parthia (c. 250/247–142 BC)
Portrait	Name	Reign	Succession
	Arsaces I	c. 250/247–217 BC (30–33 years)	Conquered Parthia from the Seleucid satrap Andragoras
	Arsaces II	c. 217–191 BC (26 years)	Son of Arsaces I
	Priapatius	c. 191–176 BC (15 years)	Grandson of a brother of Arsaces I
	Phraates I	c. 176–171 BC (5 years)	Son of Priapatius
	Mithridates I	c. 171–142 BC (Note: The Parthian conquest of Babylonia, whereafter Mithridates I assumed the style 'Great King' and firmly established his empire.) (29 years)	Son of Priapatius

Portrait	Name	Reign	Succession
	Mithridates I the Great	c. 142–132 BC (c. 10 years)	Established Parthia as an empire. Conquered the Iranian plateau in the 160s BC, followed by conquests of Babylonia (142 BC), Media (141 BC), and Persis (139 BC).
	Phraates II	c. 132–127 BC (5 years)	Son of Mithridates I
	Artabanus I (Note: Sometimes enumerated as Artabanus II since some historians consider the early Arsacid ruler Arsaces II to also be Artabanus I.)	c. 127–124/123 BC (3–4 years)	Son of Priapatius (and brother of Mithridates I)
	Mithridates II the Great	c. 123–91 BC (c. 32 years)	Son of Artabanus I
	Gotarzes I	91–87(?) BC (c. 4 years)	Son of Priapatius (and brother of Mithridates I and Artabanus I)
	Orodes I	87–79(?) BC (c. 8 years)	Son of Gotarzes I or Mithridates II (?)
	Sinatruces	c. 78–70 BC (c. 8 years)	Son of Mithridates I, previously a rival claimant c. 91–88 BC
	Phraates III	70–57 BC (13 years)	Son of Sinatruces
	Mithridates III (Note: Sometimes enumerated as Mithridates IV, after another supposed Parthian king named Mithridates (based on numismatics) dated by some historians to 87–80 BC.)	57–54 BC (3 years)	Son of Phraates III. Co-ruler with his brother Orodes II until killed in 54 BC.
	Orodes II	57–37 BC (20 years)	Son of Phraates III
	Phraates IV	37–32(?) BC (1st reign) (5 years?)	Son of Orodes II
	Tiridates (Note: Often enumerated as Tiridates II, after Tiridates I, a supposed Parthian king now believed to be unhistorical.)	32–31(?) BC (1st reign) (1 year?)	Part of the Arsacid dynasty but of unclear lineage
	Phraates IV	31–28(?) BC (2nd reign) (3 years?)	Retook the throne
	Tiridates	28–26(?) BC (2nd reign) (2 years?)	Retook the throne
	Phraates IV	26(?)–2 BC (3rd reign) (24 years?)	Retook the throne
	Phraates V	2 BC – AD 4(?) (6 years?)	Son of Phraates IV, co-ruler with Musa
	Musa	2 BC – AD 4(?) (6 years?)	Widow of Phraates IV, co-ruler with Phraates V. First of only four women to rule in Iranian history. (Note: The other three were Boran (630), Azarmidokht (630–631), and Sati Beg (1338/1339–1339/1340).)
	Orodes III	4(?)–6/7 (2/3 years?)	Part of the Arsacid dynasty but of unclear lineage
	Vonones I	6/7–11/12 (4–6 years)	Son of Phraates IV, nominated as king by the Roman Empire
	Artabanus II (Note: Sometimes enumerated as Artabanus III, if Artabanus I is considered to be Artabanus II. He is also sometimes referred to as Artabanus IV if another supposed Parthian king named Artabanus (based on numismatics), dated by some historians to 126–122 BC, is accepted.)	11/12–38 (26/27 years)	Cousin of Vonones
	Gotarzes II	38–51 (13 years)	Son of Artabanus (?)
	Vardanes	39–45/46 (6/7 years)	Son of Artabanus (?). Rival and later co-ruler of the empire with Gotarzes.
	Vonones II	51 (briefly)	Part of the Arsacid dynasty but of unclear lineage
	Vologases I	51–78 (27 years)	Son of Vardanes
	Pacorus (Note: Sometimes enumerated as Pacorus II, after Pacorus I, a Parthian prince who never ruled in his own right.)	78–79 (1st reign) (1 year)	Son of Vologases I
	Artabanus III (Note: Sometimes enumerated as Artabanus IV or Artabanus V (see note on Artabanus II).)	79–81 (2 years)	Son or brother of Vologases I
	Pacorus	81–115 (2nd reign) (34 years)	Retook the throne
	Vologases II (Note: Sometimes enumerated as Vologases III, after another supposed Parthian king named Vologases (based on numismatics) dated by some historians to 77–80.)	115–116 (1 year)	Son of Pacorus
	Parthamaspates	116–117 (1 year)	Grandson of Pacorus, installed as king by the Roman Empire
	Osroes	117–128 (11 years)	Son of Pacorus and father of Parthamaspates
	Mithridates IV (Note: Sometimes enumerated as Mithridates V (see note on Mithridates III).)	128–148 (20 years)	Part of the Arsacid dynasty but of unclear lineage
	Vologases III (Note: Sometimes enumerated as Vologases IV (see note on Vologases II).)	148–191 (43 years)	Son of Mithridates IV
	Vologases IV (Note: Sometimes enumerated as Vologases V (see note on Vologases II).)	191–207 (16 years)	Son of Vologases III
	Vologases V (Note: Sometimes enumerated as Vologases VI (see note on Vologases II).)	207–213 (6 years)	Son of Vologases IV. Possibly still in control of some parts of the empire by 228.
	Artabanus IV (Note: Sometimes enumerated as Artabanus V or Artabanus VI (see note on Artabanus II).)	213–224 (11 years)	Son of Vologases IV. Fought with Vologases V over control of the empire.

=== Sasanian Empire (224 AD–651 AD) ===
The Sasanian Empire under Khosrow II

The Sasanian dynasty originated as kings of Persis, a Parthian vassal kingdom, and claimed Achaemenid descent. In 224–226, the Sasanian dynast Ardashir I led a revolt against the Parthians, weakened in a recent civil war, and took control of the empire. Ardashir presented himself as a restorer of both regional unity and Achaemenid glory. The Sasanian Empire was a significantly more militarily powerful, centralized, and aggressive state than the Parthian Empire and was also marked by a state-backed and less heterodox form of the Zoroastrian religion.

Sasanian kings continued to use the title šāhān šāh (lit. 'King of Kings'). The title was extended by Ardashir to šāhān šāh ērān (lit. 'King of Kings of Iran') and extended again by his son Shapur I (240–270) to šāhān šāh ērān ud anērān (lit. 'King of Kings of Iran and non-Iran'). Sasanian queens ruled with the title bānbišnān bānbišn ērān ud anērān (lit. 'Queen of Queens of Iran and non-Iran'). Ctesiphon was the capital of the Sasanian Empire.

Portrait	Name	Reign	Succession
	Ardashir I the Unifier	224 – May 240 (16 years)	Defeated Artabanus IV and took control of the empire
	Shapur I	May 240 – May 270 (30 years)	Son of Ardashir I
	Hormizd I	May 270 – June 271 (1 year and 1 month)	Sons of Shapur I
	Bahram I	June 271 – 274 (3 years)	Sons of Shapur I
	Bahram II	274–293 (19 years)	Son of Bahram I
	Bahram III	293 (4 months)	Son or cousin of Bahram II
	Narseh	293–302 (9 years)	Son of Shapur I
	Hormizd II	303–309/310 (6/7 years)	Son of Narseh
—	Adur Narseh (Narseh II)	309/310 (briefly)	Son of Hormizd II
	Shapur II the Great	310–379 (69 years)	Son of Hormizd II, acclaimed ruler at birth. The longest-reigning Iranian monarch.
	Ardashir II the Beneficent	379–383 (4 years)	Son of Hormizd II
	Shapur III	383–388 (5 years)	Sons of Shapur II
	Bahram IV	388–399 (11 years)	Sons of Shapur II
	Yazdegerd I the Sinner	399–420 (21 years)	Son of Shapur III
	Shapur IV	420 (briefly)	Son of Yazdegerd I
—	Khosrow (I) (Note: Khosrow's rule was brief and ephemeral and he is not counted in the numbering of later kings of this name.)	420 (briefly)	Son of Bahram IV
	Bahram V the Onager	420–438 (18 years)	Son of Yazdegerd I
	Yazdegerd II	438–457 (19 years)	Son of Bahram V
	Hormizd III	457 (briefly)	Sons of Yazdegerd II
	Peroz I	457–484 (27 years)	Sons of Yazdegerd II
	Balash	484–488 (4 years)	Sons of Yazdegerd II
	Kavad I	488–497 (1st reign) (9 years)	Sons of Peroz
	Jamasp	497–499 (2 years)	Sons of Peroz
	Kavad I	499–531 (2nd reign) (32 years)	Restored to the throne with Hepthalite support
	Khosrow I Anushirvan (lit. 'the Immortal Soul')	531–579 (48 years)	Son of Kavad I
	Hormizd IV	579–590 (11 years)	Son of Khosrow I
	Bahram VI Chobin	590–591 (1 year)	General of Parthian descent (House of Mihran)
	Khosrow II; Parviz (lit. 'the Victorious')	June 590 – 28 February 628 (37 years and 7 or 8 months)	Son of Hormizd IV
	Vistahm	591–597 (6 years, usurper in the east)	General of Parthian descent (House of Ispahbudhan) and maternal uncle of Khosrow II. Rival king.
	Kavad II	28 February 628 – 628 (less than a year)	Son of Khosrow II, overthrew his father
	Ardashir III	628–630 (2 years)	Cousin or son of Kavad II
	Shahrbaraz	630 (less than a year)	General of Parthian descent (House of Mihran)
	Khosrow III	630 (less than a year)	Nephew of Khosrow II
	Boran	630 (less than a year)	Daughter of Khosrow II. Second of only four women to rule in Iranian history. (Note: The other three were Musa (2 BC–AD 4), Azarmidokht (630–631), and Sati Beg (1338/1339–1339/1340).)
—	Shapur V	630 (less than a year)	Son of Shahrbaraz
	Azarmidokht	630–631 (1 year)	Daughter of Khosrow II. Third of only four women to rule in Iranian history. (Note: The other three were Musa (2 BC–AD 4), Boran (630), and Sati Beg (1338/1339–1339/1340).)
	Farrukh Hormizd V	631–632 (1 year)	General of Parthian descent (House of Ispahbudhan). Attempted to seize the throne after Azarmidokht declined his marriage proposal.
	Hormizd VI	630–632 (2 years, usurper in Nisibis)	Grandson of Khosow II. Proclaimed ruler by the Sasanian troops stationed at Nisibis.
	Khosrow IV	632 (less than a year)	Great-nephew of Hormizd IV
—	Peroz II	632–632/633 (1 year?)	Brother of Khosrow IV
	Farrukhzad Khosrow V	632/633–c. 633 (1 year?)	Brother of Hormizd V
	Yazdegerd III	c. 633–651 (c. 18 years)	Grandson of Khosrow II

Later pretenders (651–731)
Portrait	Name	Tenure	Succession
	Peroz III	651–678/679 (27/28 years)	Son of Yazdegerd III, lived in exile in China (Tang dynasty) and led Iranian resistance against the Arabs. Recognized by the Tang dynasty as "king of Persia". Ruled a Tang-supported Iranian kingdom in Sistan or Tokharistan 661–674.
—	Narsieh (Narseh III)	678/679–after 708/709 (over 20 years)	Son and successor of Peroz III. Crowned by the Chinese general Pei Xingjian and placed in charge of Tokharistan. Narsieh defended the region for twenty years until defeated by the Arabs in 708/709, whereafter he returned to China.
—	Bó Qiāng Huó (Note: Name in Chinese sources. His original name in Persian may have been Pušang.)	fl. 723	Son of Narsieh. Recorded in Chinese sources as "king of Persia" and as being active in Tokharistan against the Arabs in 723.
—	Mù Shānuò (Note: Name in Chinese sources. The original Persian name is unknown.)	fl. 726–731	Recorded in Chinese sources as "king of Persia" and as being active in Tokharistan against the Arabs in 726 and 731. Names of Sasanian claimants disappear from Chinese sources after 731.

=== Minor kingdoms and dynasties ===
- The Fratarakas/Satraps (3rd–mid-2nd century BC), rulers/governors in Persis under the Seleucid Empire
- Vahshuvar as Frataraka/Satrap of Parthia minted gold coins, which is evidence of being independent
- Andragoras as Satrap of Parthia minted gold coins, which is evidence of being independent
- Rulers of Parthian sub-kingdoms (2nd century BC–5th century AD), various local vassal dynasties of the Parthian Empire
  - The kings of Persis (2nd century BC–3rd century AD), vassal kings in Persis under the Parthian Empire

== Medieval Iran (651–1501) ==
The fall of the Sasanian Empire in 651 was followed by nearly a millennium without Iranian political unity, until the rise of the Safavid Empire in 1501. In the intervening period, the territories formerly part of the ancient Iranian empires were variously subjected to larger foreign empires or divided into several smaller political units. Although no unified Iranian state existed, shared Iranian identity, culture, and language continued to survive and develop throughout the Middle Ages.

The medieval dynasties and kingdoms featured in this list follow a 2012 list of Iranian ruling dynasties by the Iranologist Touraj Daryaee.

=== Arab (caliphal) rule (638–861) ===
==== Rashidun Caliphate (638–661) ====
The Rashidun Caliphate under Uthman

The Muslim conquest of Persia began when the armies of the Rashidun Caliphate attacked parts of Sasanian Asoristan in 633. In 637/638, the Sasanians lost Mesopotamia. The empire itself was conquered in 640–651. By the time of Yazdegerd III's death in 651, the Sasanians only retained Bactria. Following the Muslim victory, the Sasanian Empire was dissolved and Iran came under the direct rule of the Rashid caliphs. Although the caliphs implemented forms of ethnic stratification that discriminated against Iranians and their culture, particularly during the later Umayyad Caliphate (661–750), they also adopted much of the old Sasanian administrative model to govern their empire.

The style of the caliphs was amīr al-mu'minīn (lit. 'commander of the faithful'). An additional title, khalīfat Allāh (lit. 'deputy of God'), was also introduced beginning with Uthman (644–656). The caliphate was initially ruled from Medina. Under Ali, the capital was transferred to Kufa in Iraq.

Portrait	Name	Reign	Succession
	Umar	637/638 – 3 November 644 (6/7 years)	Second Rashid caliph. Oversaw the initial Muslim conquest of Persia.
	Uthman	3 November 644 – 17 June 656 (11 years, 7 months and 14 days)	Chosen by tribal acclamation. Challenged by Ali.
	Ali	18 June 656 – 28 January 661 (4 years, 7 months and 10 days)	Caliph after Uthman's assassination. Challenged by Mu'awiya.
	Hasan	28 January – August 661 (6 or 7 months)	Son of Ali and grandson of Muhammad. Challenged by Mu'awiya.

==== Umayyad Caliphate (661–750) ====
The Umayyad Caliphate under Umar II

The Umayyad Caliphate was established by Mu'awiya I, governor of Syria under the Rashidun caliphs. Mu'awiya opposed the acclamations of Ali and Hasan as caliphs, leading to the civil war known as the First Fitna (656–661). Mu'awiya was victorious and became undisputed caliph after Hasan relinquished his claims.

Umayyad caliphs continued to use the styles amīr al-mu'minīn and khalīfat Allāh. The Umayyad Caliphate was ruled from Damascus, though the capital was briefly transferred to Harran under the last caliph, Marwan II.

Portrait	Name	Reign	Succession
	Mu'awiya I	July/August 661 – April/May 680 (18 years and 9 months)	Seized power in the First Fitna
	Yazid I	April/May 680 – 11 November 683 (3 years and 6 or 7 months)	Son of Mu'awiya I
	Mu'awiya II	11 November 683 – 22 June 684 (7 months and 11 days)	Son of Yazid I
	Marwan I	22 June 684 – 7 May 685 (10 months and 15 days)	Cousin of Mu'awiya I
	Abd al-Malik	7 May 685 – 8 October 705 (20 years, 5 months and 1 day)	Son of Marwan I
	al-Walid I	8 October 705 – 25 February 715 (9 years, 4 months and 17 days)	Sons of Abd al-Malik
	Sulayman	25 February 715 – 22 September 717 (2 years, 6 months and 28 days)	Sons of Abd al-Malik
	Umar II	22 September 717 – 5 February 720 (2 years, 4 months and 14 days)	Grandson of Marwan I
	Yazid II	5 February 720 – 28 January 724 (3 years, 11 months and 23 days)	Sons of Abd al-Malik
	Hisham	28 January 724 – 6 February 743 (19 years and 9 days)	Sons of Abd al-Malik
	al-Walid II	6 February 743 – 16 April 744 (1 year, 2 months and 10 days)	Son of Yazid II
	Yazid III	16 April – 20 September 744 (5 months and 4 days)	Sons of al-Walid I
	Ibrahim	20 September – 25 November 744 (2 months and 5 days)	Sons of al-Walid I
	Marwan II	25 November 744 – 750 (c. 6 years)	Grandson of Marwan I

==== Abbasid Caliphate (749–861) ====
The Abbasid Caliphate under al-Mutawakkil

Because Mu'awiya took power in civil war, the rights of his and his descendants to the caliphate was long questioned. Anti-Umayyad insurrections were to a large degree supported by non-Arab converts to Islam (especially Iranians) who were resentful over being relegated to lower social standing. In 747–750, one of these insurrections grew into the Abbasid revolution, in which the Umayyads were replaced with the Abbasids, descendants of Muhammad's uncle Abbas.

Abbasid caliphs continued to use the styles amīr al-mu'minīn and khalīfat Allāh. The Abbasid Caliphate was ruled from Kufa, until the capital was transferred to the newly founded Baghdad in 762.

Portrait	Name	Reign	Succession
	al-Saffah	6 November 749 – 9 June 754 (4 years, 7 months and 3 days)	Seized power in the Abbasid revolution
	al-Mansur	9 June 754 – 7 October 775 (21 years, 3 months and 28 days)	Brother of al-Saffrah
	al-Mahdi	7 October 775 – 4 August 785 (9 years, 9 months and 28 days)	Son of al-Mansur
	al-Hadi	4 August 785 – 15 September 786 (1 year, 1 month and 11 days)	Sons of al-Mahdi
	Harun al-Rashid	15 September 786 – 24 March 809 (22 years, 6 months and 9 days)	Sons of al-Mahdi
	al-Amin	24 March 809 – 27 September 813 (4 years, 6 months and 3 days)	Sons of Harun al-Rashid
	al-Ma'mun	27 September 813 – 7 August 833 (19 years, 10 months and 11 days)	Sons of Harun al-Rashid
	al-Mu'tasim	7 August 833 – 5 January 842 (8 years, 4 months and 29 days)	Sons of Harun al-Rashid
	al-Wathiq	5 January 842 – 10 August 847 (5 years, 7 months and 5 days)	Son of al-Mu'tasim
	al-Mutawakkil	10 August 847 – 11 December 861 (14 years, 4 months and 1 day)	Son of al-Mu'tasim. Regarded as the last Abbasid caliph wielding major political power.

=== Iranian Intermezzo (821–1090) ===
The political authority of the Abbasid caliphs diminished over the course of the ninth and tenth centuries. In Iran, this led to the establishment of several independent Iranian dynasties, the ousting of Arabs from their scattered bastions across the country, and an Iranian cultural renaissance. The period between the collapse of Abbasid authority and the conquest of Iran by the Seljuk Turks in the eleventh century is referred to as the "Iranian Intermezzo".

The Iranian Intermezzo saw the rise and fall of several major and minor dynasties. This list only includes major dynasties. Both Daryaee (2012) and Mahendrarajah (2019) list the major dynasties of the period as the Tahirids, Saffarids, Ziyarids, Buyids, and Samanids. Daryaee also includes the Ghaznavids, omitted by Mahendrarajah.

==== Tahirids (821–873) ====
The Tahirids at their greatest extent

The Tahirids were a dynasty of Islamic Iranian rulers who governed Khorasan and much of the rest of Iran under the Abbasid caliphs. The Tahirids enjoyed considerable autonomy in practice but were not de jure independent; Tahirid rulers fully acknowledged that they were subordinate viceroys, were always deferential to the caliphs, and regularly forwarded tribute to Baghdad. The Tahirids were Arabized, but they were nevertheless Persians. The Tahirids claimed descent from the Iranian mythological hero Rostam.

As vassals of the Caliphate, the Tahirid rulers used the title amir. The Tahirids initially ruled from Merv. The capital was transferred to Nishapur under Abdallah.

Portrait	Name	Reign	Succession
	Tahir I	821–822 (1 year)	Granted governorship of Khorasan by Caliph al-Ma'mun for his service in the Fourth Fitna
	Talha	822–828 (6 years)	Sons of Tahir I
—	Abdallah	828–845 (17 years)	Sons of Tahir I
—	Tahir II	845–862 (17 years)	Son of Abdallah
—	Muhammad	862–873 (11 years)	Son of Tahir II

==== Saffarids (867–1002) ====
The Saffarids at their greatest extent

The Saffarids were a dynasty of Islamic Iranian rulers who at their height ruled much of Iran, and at times even reached into modern-day Iraq, from their base of power in Sistan. Although the dynastic founder Ya'qub (867–879) claimed Sasanian descent, the Saffarid dynasty originated as local ruffians and their power was attained solely through military might. The Saffarid state expanded aggressively under the rule of Ya'qub and Amr I (879–901), under which the Tahirids were defeated and the Abbasid Caliphate was forced to confirm Saffarid control over various Iranian territories.

Following the defeat of Amr I by the Ismail Samani, the Saffarid authority was henceforth confined to Sistan. Ismail was recognized as ruler over all of Khorasan, while the Fars would come under Abbasid control in 910.

Since they were nominally Abbasid subordinates, Saffarid rulers used the title amir. Zaranj served as the Saffarid capital.

Portrait	Name	Reign	Succession
	Ya'qub	867–879 (12 years)	Local ruffian who established control over Sistan, Khorasan, and beyond
	Amr I	879–901 (22 years)	Brother of Ya'qub
—	Tahir	901–909 (8 years)	Grandson of Amr I
—	al-Layth	909–910 (1 year)	Nephew of Ya'qub and Amr I
—	Muhammad	910–911 (1 year)	Brother of al-Layth
—	al-Mu'addal	911 (less than a year)	Brother of al-Layth
—	Amr II	912–913 (1 year)	Great-grandson of Amr I
Interregnum 913–923: occupation by the Samanids.
	Ahmad	923–963 (40 years)	Married to a granddaughter of Amr I
	Khalaf	963–1002 (39 years)	Son of Ahmad

==== Samanids (875–999) ====
The Samanids at their greatest extent

The Samanids were a dynasty of Islamic Iranian rulers established by four brothers in 819, when they were granted four important cities and regions by the Abbasid Caliphate due to helping against the revolt of Rafi ibn al-Layth. In 875, the Samanids increased dramatically in power through investment as governors of Transoxiana and in 892, all Samanid-held territories were united under a single ruler (Ismail). Under Ismail, the Samanids became autonomous of the Abbasids. The Samanids claimed descent from Bahram VI Chobin (589–590).

Like other dynasties of their time, Samanid rulers used the title amir. Mansur I (961/962–976/977) assumed the style šāhānšāh (lit. 'King of Kings') as a response to the use of that title by the Buyids. Mansur I's son, Nuh II (976/977–997), also used šāhānšāh. The Samanid capital was at Samarkand (875–892) and then at Bukhara.

Portrait	Name	Reign	Succession
—	Nasr I	875 – August/September 892 (17 years)	Appointed governor of Transoxiana by the Abbasid Caliphate in 875
	Ismail	August/September 892 – 24 November 907 (15 years and 2–3 months)	Brother of Nasr I
	Ahmad the Martyred Amir	November/December 907 – 24 January 914 (6 years and 2–3 months)	Son of Ismail
	Nasr II the Fortunate	January 914 – March/April 943 (29 years and 2–3 months)	Son of Ahmad
	Nuh I	April/May 943 – 954/955 (11–12 years)	Son of Nasr II
	Abd al-Malik I	954/955–961/962 (8 years)	Son of Nuh I
	Mansur I the Righteous Amir	961/962–976/977 (15 years)	Son of Nuh I
	Nuh II	976/977 – 22 July 997 (10–11 years)	Son of Mansur I
	Mansur II	July/August 997 – 1 February 999 (1 year and 6–7 months)	Sons of Nuh II
—	Abd al-Malik II	February 999 – 999 (less than a year)	Sons of Nuh II

Later pretenders (999–1005)
Portrait	Name	Tenure	Succession
—	Ismail II; Muntasir (lit. 'the Victorious')	999–1005 (6 years)	Son of Nuh II. Fought against the Kara-Khanid Khanate, which conquered Bukhara, for several years in an effort to restore the Samanids.

==== Ziyarids (927–1090/1091) ====
The Ziyarids at their greatest extent

The Ziyarids were a dynasty of Iranian rulers established in northern Iran by Mardavij, a local mountain chief and mercenary who created an extensive kingdom in the late 920s and early 930s. Mardavij claimed descent from local pre-Islamic nobility and aspired to capture Baghdad, overthrow the Abbasids, and restore both the pre-651 empire as well as the Zoroastrian religion. These aspirations came to an end with Mardavij's murder by his Turkic military slaves in 934/935. Most of the Ziyarid realm was lost, except for territories surrounding the Caspian Sea, inherited by Mardavij's Muslim relatives.

Mardavij may have revived the Sasanian ruling title šāhānšāh (lit. 'King of Kings') since later Buyid writers attribute the title to him. (Note: Mardavij also fashioned a golden throne for himself, in imitation of the ancient throne of the Sasanian rulers.) Later Ziyarid rulers used the title amir. The Ziyarids went through a succession of capitals in northern Iran, including Ray, Amol, and Gorgan.

Portrait	Name	Reign	Succession
	Mardavij	927/928–934/935 (7 years)	Mountain chief and mercenary who took control of much of northern Iran
—	Vushmgir	934/935–966/967 (32 years)	Brother of Mardavij
	Bisutun	966/967–977/978 (11 years)	Sons of Vushmgir
	Qabus	977/978–1012/1013 (in exile 981–998) (35 years)	Sons of Vushmgir
	Manuchihr	1012/1013–1029/1030 (17 years)	Son of Qabus
—	Anushirvan	1029/1030–1049/1050 (20 years)	Son of Manuchihr
—	Keikavus	1049/1050–?	Cousin of Anushirvan
—	Gilanshah	?–1090/1091	Son of Keikavus

==== Buyids (934–1062) ====
The Buyids at their greatest extent

The Buyids were a dynasty of Islamic Iranian rulers established by three brothers who had served under Mardavij (the first Ziyarid ruler). After Mardavij's murder, the three carved out their own realm out of the southern Ziyarid territories. The Buyid state was composed of three principalities ruled by three branches of the family, sometimes with divergent goals, rather than a unified realm. The Buyids came to dominate much of Iran, a development that culminated in 945 with the capture of Baghdad and domination of the caliph himself. The Buyid dynasty claimed descent from the Sasanian king Bahram V (420–438), almost certainly a forgery.

Individual Buyid rulers were styled as amir. The senior of the three was also invested by the caliph with the grander title amīr al-omarāʾ (lit. 'great emir'). The Buyid emirates were transformed into something akin to a restored Iranian monarchy under Rukn al-Dawla and his son 'Adud al-Dawla, who also reintroduced the Sasanian royal title šāhānšāh (lit. 'King of Kings'). This title continued to be sporadically claimed by Buyid dynasts. (Note: Rukn al-Dawla claimed Iranian imperial status by 962, when he minted a medal depicting him similar to a Sasanian ruler with the inscription "may the glory of the king of kings increase". 'Adud al-Dawla also claimed the title šāhānšāh by 965. In 969, he minted a medal with the inscriptions "šāhānšāh, may his glory increase" and "May šāh Panāh Khusraw live long". The caliphs opposed Buyid use of the old imperial title. 'Adud al-Dawla's son Baha al-Dawla is recorded to have used the Arabic version of 'King of Kings' (malik al-mulūk) and the title is also recorded in both Arabic and Persian for Baha al-Dawla's grandson Abu Kalijar Marzuban. The title was sometimes assumed by rival emirs not part of the 'main branch' listed below, such as Fakhr al-Dawla and Musharrif al-Dawla.)

This list records only the 'main branch' of Buyid rulers, per Daryaee (2012). For a full list of major and minor Buyid rulers, see Buyid dynasty § Buyid rulers.

Portrait	Name	Reign	Succession
	Imad al-Dawla (Ali)	933/934–949/950 (16 years, Fars)	Son of a Daylamite chief. Seized power in the southern territories of the Ziyarid state.
	Mu'izz al-Dawla (Ahmad)	935/936–949/950 (14 years, Kerman then Iraq)	Brothers (and coregents) of Imad al-Dawla
	Rukn al-Dawla (Hasan)	946/947 – 16 September 976 (29–30 years, Ray)	Brothers (and coregents) of Imad al-Dawla
	'Adud al-Dawla (Panāh Khusraw)	949/950 – 26 March 983 (33–34 years)	Son of Rukn al-Dawla
	Sharaf al-Dawla (Shirdil)	March/April 983 – September/October 989 (6 years and 5 or 6 months)	Sons of 'Adud al-Dawla
	Samsam al-Dawla (Abu Kalijar Marzuban)	989–998 (9 years)	Sons of 'Adud al-Dawla
	Baha al-Dawla (Abu Nasr Firuz)	998–1012 (14 years)	Sons of 'Adud al-Dawla
	Sultan al-Dawla (Abu Shuja)	1012–1024 (12 years)	Son of Baha al-Dawla
	Abu Kalijar Marzuban	1024–1048 (24 years)	Son of Sultan al-Dawla
—	Abu Mansur Fulad Sutun	1048–1062 (14 years)	Son of Abu Kalijar Marzuban

==== Ghaznavids (977–1040) ====
The Ghaznavids at their greatest extent

The Ghaznavids were of Turkic slave origin. In the tenth century, Turkic slave commanders became increasingly prominent, and eventually effectively autonomous, in the southern parts of the Samanid realm. In 977, the commander Sabuktigin seized power in Ghazni, nominally as a Samanid vassal. Once the Samanids went into terminal decline and collapsed in the late tenth century, Sabuktigin's state became a fully independent realm. Although not Iranian, the Ghaznavid rulers nevertheless claimed descent from the Sasanian ruler Yazdegerd III (c. 633–651).

Sabuktigin ruled with the title al-ḥājeb al-ajall (lit. 'most noble commander'). From 999 onwards, the Ghaznavids ruled with the title sulṭān. Sabuktigin's capital, Ghazni, remained the Ghaznavid capital for the duration of their rule in Iran.

Portrait	Name	Reign	Succession
	Sabuktigin	977/978–997/998 (20 years)	Seized power in Ghazni
—	Ismail	997/998–998 (less than a year)	Sons of Sabuktigin
	Mahmud	998 – 30 April 1030 (32 years)	Sons of Sabuktigin
	Muhammad	1030 (briefly)	Sons of Mahmud
	Masʽud	1030 – 23 May 1040 (10 years)	Sons of Mahmud

The Ghaznavids lost their territories in Iran to the Seljuks after the Battle of Dandanaqan (1040). For later Ghaznavid rulers, see Ghaznavids § List of rulers.

=== Turco-Mongol rule (1038–1508) ===
==== Seljuk Empire (1038–1194) ====
The Seljuk Empire under Malik-Shah I

The Seljuk Empire was established by the Turkoman chieftain Tughril I, who invaded the Ghaznavids in the late 1030s. In 1040, the Seljuks conquered the Ghaznavid-held parts of Iran and over the following decades they established control over most of the Middle East, ending the Iranian Intermezzo. Though they were not of Iranian origin, the Seljuk rulers bolstered their legitimacy by claiming descent from Afrasiab, a legendary figure from the Shahnameh.

From the empire's inception, the Seljuk rulers minted coins with the title šāhānšāh (lit. 'King of Kings') in its Persian form, perhaps adopting it from the Buyids. Later on, the rulers more prominently used the Arabic title sulṭān and royal styles such as the Arabic malik and Persian šāh were bestowed on vassals. Šāhānšāh continued to be used on the majority of Seljuk coinage, sometimes in the new variant "šāhānšāh king of Islam". Nishapur served as the first capital of the Seljuk Empire. In 1143, the capital was moved to Ray and a few years later it was moved again to Isfahan. From 1118 onwards, the Seljuk regime became increasingly unstable and rival claimants used various bases of power, including Baghdad, Hamadan, and Merv.

Portrait	Name	Reign	Succession
	Tughril I	June/July 1038 – 4 September 1063 (25 years and 2–3 months)	Initiated the Seljuk conquest of Iran
	Alp Arslan	4 September 1063 – 15 December 1072 (9 years, 3 months and 11 days)	Nephew of Tughril I
	Malik-Shah I	15 December 1072 – 14 October 1092 (19 years, 9 months and 29 days)	Son of Alp Arslan
	Mahmud I	14 October 1092 – 1093 (c. 1 year)	Sons of Malik-Shah I
	Berkyaruq	October/November 1092 – 22 December 1104 (12 years and 1–2 months)	Sons of Malik-Shah I
—	Malik-Shah II	22 December 1104 – February/March 1105 (2–3 months)	Son of Berkyaruq
	Muhammad I Tapar	February/March 1105 – 5 August 1118 (13 years and 5–6 months)	Son of Malik-Shah I
	Mahmud II	5 August 1118 – 11 September 1131 (13 years, 1 month and 6 days)	Son of Muhammad I Tapar. Defeated by his uncle Ahmad Sanjar after eight months of rule, thereafter sultan only in Iraq.
	Ahmad Sanjar	1118 – 8 May 1157 (39 years)	Son of Malik-Shah I. Previously Seljuk ruler in Khorasan.
—	Dawud	December 1132/January 1133 (briefly)	Son of Mahmud II; sultan in Iraq
—	Tughril II	December 1132/January 1133 – October/November 1134 (1 year and 10 months)	Sons of Muhammad I Tapar; sultans in Iraq
—	Mas'ud	October/November 1134 – 10 October 1152 (18 years)	Sons of Muhammad I Tapar; sultans in Iraq
	Malik-Shah III	October 1152 – December 1152/January 1153 (2–3 months)	Sons of Mahmud II; sultans in Iraq
—	Muhammad II	December 1152/January 1153 – December 1159/January 1160 (7 years)	Sons of Mahmud II; sultans in Iraq
—	Suleiman-Shah	22 March – September/October 1160 (6–7 months)	Son of Muhammad I Tapar; sultan in Iraq
—	Arslan-Shah	September/October 1160 – January/February 1176 (15 years and 4 months)	Son of Tughril II; sultan in Iraq
	Tughril III	January/February 1176 – 1194 (18 years)	Son of Arslan-Shah; sultan in Iraq

==== Khwarazmian Empire (1097–1220/1221) ====
The Khwarazmian Empire under Muhammad II

The Seljuk Empire fractured after the death of Ahmad Sanjar in 1157 and its vassals became effectively independent. One of these vassals was the Anushtegin dynasty, which ruled the Khwarazm region. The ruling dynasty were descendants of Anushtegin Gharchai, a former Turkic slave of the Seljuq sultans. In 1194, the Khwarazmian ruler Tekish conquered western Iran and Iraq from the remnants of the Seljuk Empire.

The Khwarazmian rulers used the ancient title xwârazmšāh, traditionally held by Iranian rulers of Khwarazm. Urganj was the Khwarazmian capital.

Portrait	Name	Reign	Succession
	Muhammad I	1096/1097 – 1127/1128 (31 years)	Seljuk vassal in Khwarazm
	Atsiz	1127/1128 – 30 July 1156 (28–29 years)	Son of Muhammad I. Seljuk vassal.
	Il-Arslan	22 August 1156 – March 1172 (15 years and 7 months)	Son of Atsiz
—	Sultan Shah	1172 – 11 December 1172 (less than a year)	Son of Il-Arslan. Deposed by Tekish, who he continued to oppose as a rival claimant until 1193.
	Tekish	11 December 1172 – 3 July 1200 (27 years, 6 months and 22 days)	Son of Il-Arslan. Conquered western Iran and Iraq from the remnants of the Seljuk Empire in 1194.
	Muhammad II	3 August 1200 – 1220/1221 (20–21 years)	Son of Tekish

Later pretenders (1220/1221–1231)
Portrait	Name	Tenure	Succession
	Mangburni	1220/1221 – August 1231 (10–11 years)	Son of Muhammad II. Fled to India for three years (1221–1224) after the Mongol conquest of the Khwarazmian Empire and was then involved in various wars in western Iran.

==== Mongol Empire (1220–1259) ====
The Mongol Empire's nominal size under Kublai Khan (1279)

The Mongol Empire was established by Genghis Khan in 1206 through uniting the Mongol clans. The unification of the clans was followed by aggressive imperial expansion throughout Asia and parts of Europe. In the early thirteenth century, the Mongols under reached Iran. The region around Bukhara was conquered in 1220 and the Khwarazmian Empire was destroyed. Over the following decades, further conquests followed in the Middle East, culminating in the fall of Baghdad and end of the Abbasid Caliphate's rule there in 1258.

The rulers of the Mongol Empire used the ruling title khagan (lit. 'Great Khan' or 'emperor'). In the 1230s, the Mongol Empire established its capital at Karakorum in Mongolia.

Portrait	Name	Reign	Succession
	Genghis Khan	1220 – 25 August 1227 (7 years)	Founder of the Mongol Empire. Conquered the region around Bukhara in 1220, initiating Mongol rule in Iran.
	Ögedei Khan	13 September 1229 – 11 December 1241 (12 years, 2 months and 28 days)	Son of Genghis
	Güyük Khan	24 August 1246 – April 1248 (1 year and 8 months)	Son of Ögedei
	Möngke Khan	2 May 1252 – 11 August 1259 (7 years, 3 months and 9 days)	Grandson of Genghis

==== Ilkhanate (1256–1388) ====
The Ilkhanate under Ghazan Khan

After the death of Möngke Khan, the Mongol Empire was fractured by civil war, both over the succession of the next Great Khan and between nomadic traditionalists and the new settled princes of China and the Middle East. Kublai Khan (1260–1294) was eventually universally recognized but the empire was irreversibly fragmented. In much of the south-west of the empire (including Iran), power fell to Hulegu Khan, who had been made a deputy there under Möngke Khan. Hulegu was swiftly accepted as a legitimate ruler in Iran and was further legitimized through a fatwa issued by the Shia scholar Ali ibn Tawus al-Hilli. Iran experienced a cultural renaissance under Ilkhanid rule. Ghazan Khan (1295–1304) converted to Islam in the late thirteenth century, turning the state further away from the other Mongol realms.

The rulers of the Ilkhanate adopted the style ilkhan (lit. 'subordinate khan') to show deference to the Great Khan in China and Mongolia. From the time of Ghazan Khan onwards, they also used the title pādishāh-i Īrān (lit. 'emperor of Iran'), sometimes extended to pādishāh-i Īrān wa Islām (lit. 'emperor of Iran and Islam'). The version pādishāh-i Islām (lit. 'emperor of Islam') is also recorded. The Ilkhanate went through a succession of capitals, beginning with Maragheh (1256–1265), Tabriz (1265–1306), and Soltaniyeh (1306–1335). After the empire disintegrated in the 1330s, various claimants established different centres of power. The last ilkhan, Luqman, ruled from Astarabad under Timurid suzerainty.

Portrait	Name	Reign	Succession
	Hulegu Khan	1256 – 8 February 1265 (9 years)	Grandson of Genghis Khan. Granted power in Iran under Möngke Khan.
	Abaqa Khan	8 February 1265 – 1 April 1282 (17 years, 1 month and 24 days)	Sons of Hulegu
	Ahmad Tekuder	1 April 1282 – 10 August 1284 (2 years, 4 months and 9 days)	Sons of Hulegu
	Arghun Khan	11 August 1284 – 10 March 1291 (6 years, 6 months and 27 days)	Sons of Abaqa
	Gaykhatu	10 March 1291 – 26 March 1295 (4 years and 16 days)	Sons of Abaqa
	Baydu	26 March – summer? 1295 (a few months)	Grandson of Hulegu
	Ghazan Khan	Summer? 1295 – 11 May 1304 (9 years)	Sons of Arghun
	Öljaitü	11 May 1304 – 16 December 1316 (12 years, 7 months and 5 days)	Sons of Arghun
	Abu Sa'id Bahadur Khan	16 December 1316 – 30 November 1335 (18 years, 11 months and 14 days)	Son of Öljaitü
	Musa Khan	1335/1336–1336 (less than a year)	Grandson of Baydu
	Arpa Khan	1335–1336 (1 year)	Descendant of Tolui, the father of Hulegu
	Muhammad Khan	1336–1338 (2 years)	Great-great-great-grandson of Hulegu
	Togha Temür	1337–1353 (6 years)	Descendant of Qasar, a brother of Genghis Khan
	Jahan Temür	1338/1339–1340/1341 (2 years)	Grandson of Gaykhatu
—	Sati Beg	1338/1339–1339/1340 (1 year)	Daughter of Öljaitü. Fourth and last of only four women to rule in Iranian history. (Note: The other three were Musa (2 BC–AD 4), Boran (630), and Azarmidokht (630–631).)
—	Suleiman Khan	1339/1340 – 1343/1344 (4 years)	Great-great-grandson of Hulegu
	Anushirwan Khan	1344–1356 (12 years)	Unknown lineage
—	Ghazan II	1356–1357 (1 year)	Son of Togha Temür
—	Luqman	1356–1388 (32 years)	Son of Togha Temür. Puppet ruler under various warlords, including Amir Vali and later Timur.

==== Timurid Empire (1370–1458) ====
The Timurid Empire under Timur

The Timurid Empire was established by Timur, a conqueror who claimed both Turkic and Mongol descent. Timur began as a minor brigand chief under the Chagatai Khanate. In the middle 1360s, Timur rose to become the effective ruler of Transoxiana. He went on to establish his seat of power in Khorasan and conquered most of Iran through campaigns in the 1380s and 1390s.

During his conquests, Timur made some effort to portray himself as the heir of the Ilkhanate, adopting the Ilkhanid title pādishāh-i Islām (lit. 'emperor of Islam'). Timur also used the style guregen (lit. 'son-in-law') to stress his marriage to Saray Mulk Khanum, a descendant of Genghis Khan. Pādishāh continued to be used by Timur's successors, who at times also adopted the style of sulṭān. Samarkand was the capital of the Timurid Empire.

Portrait	Name	Reign	Succession
	Timur	9 April 1370 – 18 February 1405 (34 years, 10 months and 9 days)	Conquered Iran in the 1370s–1390s.
—	Pir Muhammad	February 1405 – 1407 (2 years)	Grandson of Timur and his designated heir. Ruler in Fars.
	Khalil Sultan	February 1405 – 1409/1410 (4–5 years)	Grandson of Timur. Senior Timurid ruler and ruler of Persia.
	Shah Rukh	February 1405 – 1446/1447 (41–42 years)	Son of Timur. Initially only ruler in Khorasan; ruler of the entire empire from 1415/1416 onwards.
	Ulugh Beg	1446/1447 – October/November 1449 (2–3 years)	Son of Shah Rukh
—	Abdal-Latif Mirza	October/November 1449 – May 1450 (6–7 months)	Son of Ulugh Beg
	Abdullah Mirza	May 1450 – 1451/1452 (1–2 years)	Grandson of Shah Rukh
	Abu Sa'id Mirza	1451/1452–1458 (6–7 years)	Great-grandson of Timur

The Timurids lost almost all of their territories in Iran to the Qara Qoyunlu in 1452–1458. For later Timurid rulers in Khorasan and elsewhere, see Timurid Empire § Emperors (Emir).

==== Qara Qoyunlu (1452–1469) ====
The Qara Qoyunlu under Jahan Shah

The Qara Qoyunlu were a semi-nomadic Turkoman confederation that grew in power west of Iran following the collapse of the Ilkhanate. The origins of the Qara Qoyunlu are obscure and they are first recorded as an identifiable group in the 1330s. Under the leader Jahan Shah, the Qara Qoyunlu seized most of Iran from the Timurids. This began with the conquest of Jibal in 1452, and continued with further conquests of Isfahan, Fars, and Kerman in 1458.

The Qara Qoyunlu rulers presented themselves as rulers of Iran and political successors of the Ilkhanate, using titles such as pādishāh-i Īrān (lit. 'emperor of Iran') and kesra-yi Īrān (lit. 'Caesar of Iran'). Tabriz served as the Qara Qoyunlu capital 1436–1467.

This list only includes the Qara Qoyunlu rulers who ruled Iran. For a full list, see the list of rulers of Qara Qoyunlu.

Portrait	Name	Reign	Succession
	Jahan Shah	1452–1467 (15 years)	Conquered much of Iran from the Timurid Empire in 1452–1458
	Hasan Ali	1467–1469 (2 years)	Son of Jahan Shah

==== Aq Qoyunlu (1465–1508) ====
The Aq Qoyunlu under Uzun Hasan

Like the Qara Qoyunlu, the Aq Qoyunlu were a semi-nomadic Turkoman confederation that rose to power after the Ilkhanate's collapse. The Aq Qoyunlu was a more long-lived and better recorded group. In the 1450s and 1460s, the Aq Qoyunlu under Uzun Hasan defeated both the Qara Qoyunlu and Timurid forces and by 1469, Uzun Hasan ruled all of Iraq and Iran.

Like the preceding Qara Qoyunlu, the Aq Qoyunlu rulers titled themselves as pādishāh-i Īrān (lit. 'emperor of Iran') and kesra-yi Īrān (lit. 'Caesar of Iran'), among other titles. Amida was the original Aq Qoyunlu capital. The capital was transferred to Tabriz under Uzun Hasan.

This list only includes the Aq Qoyunlu rulers who ruled Iran. For a full list, see the list of rulers of Aq Qoyunlu.

Portrait	Name	Reign	Succession
	Uzun Hasan	1465/1469–1478 (9–13 years)	Conquered Iran in the 1460s
	Sultan-Khalil	1478 (less than a year)	Sons of Uzun Hasan
	Yaqub	1478–1490 (12 years)	Sons of Uzun Hasan
	Baysunghur	1490–1492 (2 years)	Son of Yaqub
	Rustam Beg	1492–1496 (4 years)	Grandsons of Uzun Hasan
	Ahmad Beg	1496–1497 (1 year)	Grandsons of Uzun Hasan
	Alvand Beg	1497–1502 (5 years, in Diyar Bakr and then Azerbaijan)	Grandsons of Uzun Hasan
—	Muhammad Beg	1499–1500 (1 year, in Iraq and southern Persia)	Grandsons of Uzun Hasan
	Sultan Murad	1500–1508 (8 years, in Fars and Kerman)	Son of Yaqub
—	Zayn al-Abidin	1504–1508 (4 years, in Diyar Bakr)	Great-grandson of Uzun Hasan

=== Minor kingdoms and dynasties ===
- Various local Iranian dynasties in Tabaristan:
  - The Qarinvand dynasty (550s–11th century)
  - The Dabuyid dynasty (642–760)
  - The Bavand dynasty (651–1349)
  - The Baduspanid dynasty (665–1598)
  - The Eshaqvand dynasty (13th–16th century)
  - The Afrasiyab dynasty (1349–1504)
- Minor dynasties of the Iranian Intermezzo:
  - The Ghurid dynasty (786–1215) originated in central Afghanistan, later conquered much of Khorasan and northern Indian subcontinent
  - The Sajid dynasty (889–929) in north-western Iran and Azerbaijan
  - The Rawadid dynasty (900–1070/1116) in Azerbaijan
  - The Simjurids (913–1002) in Khorasan and Gorgan as viceroys of Samanid Empire and Buyid dynasty
  - The Sallarid dynasty (919–1062) in north-western Iran and Azerbaijan
  - The Ilyasids (932–968) in Kerman
  - The Shaddadids (951–1199) in Armenia
  - The Hasanwayhids (959–1015) in north-western Iran and Azerbaijan
  - The Marwanids (983/990–1084) in Mesopotamia
  - The Annazids (990/991–late 12th century) in western Iran/eastern Iraq
  - The Kakuyids (1008–1141) in central Iran
  - The Nizari Ismaili state (1090–1256) in Alamut and Rudbar
    - The Muhtashams of Quhistan (1091–1256) in Quhistan region, as viceroys for Nizari Ismaili state
- Minor successor states of the Ilkhanate:
  - The Kart dynasty (1244–1381) in much of Khorasan
  - The Muzaffarids (1314–1393) in central and southern Iran
  - The Injuids (1335–1357) in southern Iran
  - The Jalayirid Sultanate (1335–1432) in Iraq and western Iran
  - The Sarbadars (1337–1381) in parts of Khorasan
  - The Chobanids (1338–1357) in north-western Iran and Azerbaijan

== Modern Iran (1501–1979) ==
=== Safavid Iran (1501–1722) ===
Safavid Iran under Abbas the Great

Of native Iranian (possibly Kurdish) origins, (Note: Algar 2006, pp. 456–474: "The Safavids originated as a hereditary lineage of Sufi shaikhs centered on Ardabil, Shafeʿite in school and probably Kurdish in origin."; Amanat 2017, p. 40: "The Safavi house originally was among the landowning nobility of Kurdish origin, with affinity to the Ahl-e Haqq in Kurdistan (chart 1). In the twelfth century, the family settled in northeastern Azarbaijan, where Safi al-Din Ardabili (d. 1334), the patriarch of the Safavid house and Ismail's ancestor dating back six generations, was a revered Sufi leader."; Amoretti & Matthee 2009: "Of Kurdish ancestry, the Ṣafavids started as a Sunnī mystical order (...)"; Blow 2009, p. 1: "The Safavids are thought to have been Kurdish in origin, but by Sheikh Safi's day they were a Persian-speaking family of small landowners, living near Ardabil, which was a commercial centre in mountainous country, about 40 miles inland from the Caspian Sea. There was also a large Turkoman tribal population in Azerbaijan, who spoke a language closely related to Turkish, known today as Azeri. In time the province would become almost entirely Azeri-speaking."; Böwering et al. 2013, p. xiii: "The Turkic-speaking Safavids of Kurdish origin arose from a Sunni Sufi fraternity that was organized in Azerbaijan by Safi al-Din (d. 1334)."; Donzel 1994, p. 222: "The Kurds played an important part in the history of the Near East. Several dynasties, such as the Marwanids of Diyarbakr, the Ayyubids, the Shaddadids and probably the Safawids, as well as prominent personalities, were of Kurdish origin."; Matthee 2005, p. 18: "The Safavids, as Iranians of Kurdish ancestry and of nontribal background, did not fit this pattern, although the stat they set up with the aid of Turkmen tribal forces of Eastern Anatolia closely resembled this division in its makeup. Yet, the Turk versus Tajik division was not impregnable."; Matthee 2008: "As Persians of Kurdish ancestry and of a non-tribal background, the Safavids did not fit this pattern, though the state they set up with the assistance of Turkmen tribal forces of eastern Anatolia closely resembled this division in its makeup."; Manz 2021, p. 169: "The Safavid dynasty was of Iranian – probably Kurdish – extraction and had its beginnings as a Sufi order located at Ardabil near the eastern border of Azerbaijan, in a region favorable for both agriculture and pastoralism."; Minorsky 1960, p. 190: "After 907/1502 Āḏẖarbayḏj̱ān became the chief bulwark and rallying ground of the Ṣafawids, themselves natives of Ardabil and originally speaking the local Iranian dialect."; Savory 1970, p. 394: "Despite recent research, the origins of the Safavid family are still obscure. Such evidence as we have seems to suggest that the family hailed from Kurdistān. What does seem certain is that the Safavids were of native Iranian stock, and spoke Āzarī, the form of Turkish used in Āzarbāyjān. Our lack of reliable information derives from the fact that the Safavids, after the establishment of the Safavid state, deliberately falsified the evidence of their own origins."; Savory 1997, p. 8: "This official version contains textual changes designed to obscure the Kurdish origins of the Safavid family and to vindicate their claim to descent from the Imams."; Tapper 1997, p. 39: "The Safavid Shahs who ruled Iran between 1501 and 1722 descended from Sheikh Safi ad-Din of Ardabil (1252–1334). Sheikh Safi and his immediate successors were renowned as holy ascetics Sufis. Their own origins were obscure; probably of Kurdish or Iranian extraction, they later claimed descent from the Prophet.") the Safavid dynasty originated as the leaders of the medieval mystic Safavid order. In 1499, the Safavid sheikh Ismail defeated the Shirvanshahs of Azerbaijan and began to wrest control of Iran from the Aq Qoyunlu. The power of the Aq Qoyunlu was decisively broken in 1501 with the defeat of Alvand Beg. In 1502, Ismail crowned himself šâhanšâh at Tabriz. The rise of the Safavids is often considered the beginning of modern Iranian history, with their state being the earliest stage of the modern Iranian nation state. Through further conquests, the Safavids restored Iran as a single Iranian political unit and retransformed the tribal nomadic order of the land, established during its period under Turko-Mongol rule, into a sedentary society. Shia Islam was for the first time established as the state religion. The Safavids claimed descent from Musa al-Kazim, the seventh Twelver Shia Imam.

The Safavids ruled as šâhanšâh-e Irân (lit. 'King of Kings of Iran'). The initial capital of the Safavid Empire was at Tabriz. Due to conflict with the Ottoman Empire in the west, the capital was moved eastwards to Qazvin in 1548, and then to Isfahan in the 1590s.

Portrait	Name	Reign	Succession
	Ismail I	11 May 1502 – 22/23 May 1524 (22 years and 11 days)	Conquered and reunified Iran
	Tahmasp I	22/23 May 1524 – 22 August 1576 (52 years and 3 months)	Son of Ismail I
	Ismail II	22 August 1576 – 11 February 1578 (1 year, 5 months and 20 days)	Sons of Tahmasp I
	Mohammad Khodabanda	11 February 1578 – 2 December 1587 (9 years, 9 months and 21 days)	Sons of Tahmasp I
	Abbas I the Great	2 December 1587 – 21 January 1629 (41 years, 1 month and 19 days)	Son of Mohammad Khodabanda
	Safi I	21 January 1629 – 12 May 1642 (13 years, 3 months and 21 days)	Grandson of Abbas I
	Abbas II	12 May 1642 – 27 September 1667 (25 years, 4 months and 15 days)	Son of Safi I
	Safi II (Note: The coronation of Safi II was followed by epidemics and famine. Court astrologers thus declared that he had been crowned at an inauspicious time. This prompted the shah to have himself re-crowned under the name Suleiman I in 1668.) (1667–1668); Suleiman I (1668–1694)	3 October 1667 – 30 January 1694 (26 years, 3 months and 27 days)	Son of Abbas II
	Soltan Hoseyn I	28 April 1694 – 22 October 1722 (28 years, 5 months and 24 days)	Son of Suleiman I

=== Intermediate period (1722–1796) ===
Complex rivalries in the region of Khorasan led to the Afghan Hotak dynasty invading Iran. In 1722, this conflict led to the collapse of the Safavid Empire after the siege of Isfahan. The brief interlude between 1722 and the rise of the Qajar dynasty in 1789–1796 was marked by widespread political turmoil in Iran and several rival attempts to establish power over the country. The Safavids failed to regain power and the Hotaks failed to establish control. The rival Afsharid and Zand dynasties were established by Nader Shah (1736–1747) and Karim Khan (1751–1779), respectively. Although both of these founding figures established their rule over large parts of the former Safavid domain, the political influence of their dynasties swiftly collapsed under their successors.

==== Hotaks (1722–1729) ====
The Hotak dynasty under Mahmud Hotak

In 1701, unrest among the Ghilji Pashtun tribe of Afghanistan led to a rebellion against the Safavids. This uprising was suppressed by the local commander, George XI of Kartli, but the Afghan anti-Safavid movement continued under Mirwais Hotak, who established independence in Kandahar. He was later succeeded by Mahmud Hotak, who in 1720, began raiding the Kerman area and in March 1722, a larger hastily assembled and more powerful Safavid army was defeated at the Battle of Gulnabad. Following a six-month siege of Isfahan, Soltan Hoseyn I formally submitted to Mahmud and recognized him as the new shah of Iran. The Hotak rulers of Iran ruled from the former Safavid capital of Isfahan.

Portrait	Name	Reign	Succession
	Mahmud Hotak	22 October 1722 – April/May 1725 (2 years and 5 or 6 months)	Invaded and seized power from Soltan Hoseyn I
	Ashraf Hotak	April/May 1725 – 1729 (4 years)	Cousin of Mahmud Hotak; murdered and overthrew Mahmud

==== Safavid dynasty (1722–1773) ====
When news of the fall of Isfahan reached Soltan Hoseyn I's son Tahmasp II at Qazvin, Tahmasp proclaimed himself shah. Pro-Safavid forces successfully defeated Ashraf Hotak in 1729 and forced Afghan forces out of Iran. Tahmasp failed to assert his authority in the aftermath of the Hotak invasion and the effective ruler of Iran was instead the general Nader Khan. In 1732, Nader deposed Tahmasp and replaced him with the eight-month old Abbas III. Abbas was in turn deposed in 1736 and Nader Khan was proclaimed the new shah of Iran under the name Nader Shah, terminating the Safavid dynasty. Safavid descendants continued to emerge for some time after 1736 as pretenders or as figurehead rulers put forward by warlords vying for power in Iran.

Portrait	Name	Reign	Succession
	Tahmasp II	31 October 1722 – August 1732 (9 years and 9 or 10 months)	Son of Soltan Hoseyn I
	Abbas III	7 September 1732 – 8 March 1736 (3 years, 6 months and 1 day)	Son of Tahmasp II
No recognized Safavid ruler 1736–1750
	Suleiman II	13 January – March 1750 (2 months)	Grandson of Suleiman I. Proclaimed shah at Mashhad after the deposition of Shahrokh Shah (Afsharid) and ruled until Shahrokh was restored.
	Ismail III	Summer 1750 – 1773 (23 years)	Grandson of Soltan Hoseyn I. Proclaimed shah at Isfahan by Karim Khan Zand in 1750, as a puppet ruler.
—	Soltan Hoseyn II	1752/1753	Son of an Azeri man and an Armenian woman, but claimed to be a son of Tahmasp II. Proclaimed shah at Baghdad by Ali Mardan Khan Bakhtiari, as a puppet ruler.

==== Afsharids (1736–1796) ====
Afsharid Iran under Nader Shah

The Afsharid dynasty was established by Nader Shah, a general under the Safavids who seized control of the empire in 1736 after the deposition of Abbas III. Nader was a powerful conqueror but the Afsharid Empire quickly collapsed after his assassination in 1747. Large territories fell to the rival Zand dynasty as well as the Afghan Durrani Empire. The domain of Nader's heirs became largely confined to the Iranian parts of Khorasan. For most of its later history, the Afsharid state was dominated by military leaders or other court factions. The Afsharids ruled with the style of šâhanšâh and their capital was at Mashhad.

Portrait	Name	Reign	Succession
	Nader	8 March 1736 – 20 June 1747 (11 years, 3 months and 12 days)	General; deposed Abbas III
	Adel	6 July 1747 – 24 September 1748 (1 year, 1 month and 18 days)	Nephew of Nader; proclaimed ruler after Nader's assassination
	Shahrokh	1 October 1748 – 13 January 1750 (1st reign) (1 year, 3 months and 12 days)	Grandson of Nader and matrilineal grandson of Soltan Hoseyn I (Safavid). Proclaimed ruler by tribal leaders at Mashhad in opposition to Adel.
	Ebrahim	8 December 1748 – December 1749 (~1 year)	Brother of Adel; proclaimed ruler (in opposition to Shahrokh) after deposing and blinding Adel
Shahrokh was removed from the throne in January–March 1750 in favor of the Safavid ruler Suleiman II
	Shahrokh	March 1750 – 1796 (2nd reign) (46 years)	Restored to the throne

==== Zands (1751–1794) ====
Zand Iran under Lotf Ali Khan

In the aftermath of Nader Shah's assassination, the Zand dynasty grew to become the most powerful rivals of the Afsharids and seized control of much of Iran in the 1750s. Established by the tribal leader Karim Khan Zand, the Zand rulers never proclaimed themselves to be shahs. Instead, they presented themselves as regents of Iran, at first on behalf of the Safavid puppet Ismail III (1750–1773) and then on behalf of the Iranian people. Karim Khan Zand ruled with the title of khân, as well as the style of wakil (regent) or wakil-al-raʿāyāʾ (lit. 'regent of the people'). His successors ruled simply as khân, though were often considered to be "kings" by European observers. The Zand dynasty ruled from Shiraz.

Portrait	Name	Reign	Succession
	Karim	1751 – 1 March 1779 (28 years)	Seized power over much of Iran
—	Mohammad-Ali	2 March – 19 June 1779 (3 months and 17 days)	Son of Karim. Joint co-ruler with his brother Abol-Fath.
—	Abol-Fath	2 March – 22 August 1779 (5 months and 20 days)	Son of Karim. Initially joint co-ruler with his brother Mohammad-Ali.
	Sadeq	22 August 1779 – 14 March 1781 (1 year, 6 months and 20 days)	Brother of Karim
	Ali-Morad	14 March 1781 – 10 January 1785 (3 years, 9 months and 27 days)	Member of the 'Hazāra' branch of the Zand family
	Jafar	17 January 1785 – 23 January 1789 (4 years and 6 days)	Son of Sadeq
	Sayed Morad	23 January – 7 May 1789 (3 months and 14 days)	Cousin of Ali-Morad. Mutinied against Jafar (leading to Jafar's death) and opposed the accession of Jafar's son, Lotf Ali.
	Lotf Ali	7 May 1789 – November 1794 (5 years and 5 or 6 months)	Son of Jafar

=== Qajar Iran (1789–1925) ===
Qajar Iran under Agha Mohammad Shah

The Qajar dynasty originated as a local Turkoman noble family in northern Iran, under the Safavids. The Qajars gradually increased in power as other families fought each other in Iran, culminating in Agha Mohammad Shah proclaiming himself ruler in 1789, in opposition to the Afsharids and Zands. Agha Mohammad defeated the Zand dynasty in 1794 and was officially crowned in 1796. Shortly thereafter, he captured and deposed the Afsharid Shahrokh Shah, reunifying Iran under a single ruler.

Agha Mohammad Shah ruled with the title khân and later šâh, never assuming the more grandiose šâhanšâh. Agha Mohammad's successor, Fath-Ali Shah, assumed both šâhanšâh and the Mongol khagan, titles frequently used by later Qajar rulers. Many other honorifics of imperial and religious significance were also used by the Qajar rulers. The Qajar dynasty ruled from Tehran, inaugurated as Iran's capital in the 1780s under Agha Mohammad Shah.

Portrait	Name	Reign	Succession
	Agha Mohammad	1789 – 17 June 1797 (8 years)	Seized power and reunified Iran 1789–1796
	Fath-Ali	17 June 1797 – 23 October 1834 (37 years, 4 months and 6 days)	Nephew of Agha Mohammad
	Mohammad	23 October 1834 – 5 September 1848 (13 years, 10 months and 13 days)	Grandson of Fath-Ali
	Naser al-Din	5 September 1848 – 1 May 1896 (47 years, 7 months and 26 days)	Son of Mohammad
	Mozaffar ad-Din	1 May 1896 – 3 January 1907 (10 years, 8 months and 2 days)	Son of Naser al-Din
	Mohammad Ali	3 January 1907 – 16 July 1909 (2 years, 6 months and 13 days)	Son of Mozaffar ad-Din
	Ahmad	16 July 1909 – 15 December 1925 (16 years, 4 months and 29 days)	Son of Mohammad Ali

Later pretenders (1925–1943)
Portrait	Name	Tenure	Succession
	Ahmad	15 December 1925 – 27 February 1930 (4 years, 2 months and 12 days)	Ruler of Iran 1909–1925. Died in exile in France.
	Mohammad Hassan	27 February 1930 – 7 January 1943 (11 years, 10 months and 11 days)	Son of Mohammad Ali and designated successor of Ahmad (his brother).
	Hamid	No formal claim put forth	Son of Mohammad Hassan. Viewed himself as the rightful heir after his father's death but did not officially claim the throne. Was monitored by the US Department of State in 1943 over whether he would declare himself Shah of Iran.
	Fereydoun	No formal claim put forth	Son of Ahmad. While he lived in Switzerland in 1943, the US Department of State intercepted and suppressed messages from relatives urging Fereydoun to declare himself the rightful Shah of Iran.
There continues to be recognized heads of the Qajar family in exile to the present day, though the family has renounced all claims to rule through lineage and does not endorse political activity under its coat of arms.

=== Pahlavi Iran (1925–1979) ===
Map of Pahlavi Iran

During the late Qajar dynasty, Iran became increasingly embroiled in internal political turmoil over the extent of the monarch's power, among other events leading to the Persian Constitutional Revolution (1905–1911). In 1923, the brigade commander Reza Khan quickly rose through the ranks to become prime minister. In 1925, Reza succeeded in deposing Ahmad Shah and having himself proclaimed by Iran's National Assembly first as regent and then as the new monarch. As his family name, Reza took Pahlavi, after the Pahlavi language of the pre-Islamic Sasanian Empire.

The Pahlavi rulers styled themselves as šâhanšâh-e Irân (lit. 'King of Kings of Iran'). Tehran remained the capital of Iran under Pahlavi rule.

Portrait	Name	Reign	Succession
	Reza	15 December 1925 – 16 September 1941 (15 years, 9 months and 1 day)	Former prime minister
	Mohammad Reza	16 September 1941 – 11 February 1979 (37 years, 4 months and 26 days)	Son of Reza

Later pretenders (1979–present)
Portrait	Name	Tenure	Succession
	Mohammad Reza	11 February 1979 – 27 July 1980 (1 year, 5 months and 16 days)	Ruler of Iran 1941–1979. Died in exile in Egypt.
	Reza ("Reza II")	31 October 1980 – present (46 years and 22 days)	Son of Mohammad Reza. Proclaimed himself "Reza II", rightful ruler of Iran, in October 1980. Has voiced support for democracy but has not renounced his claim to the throne.

== See also ==
- History of Iran – a general overview of Iranian history
- Monarchism in Iran – advocacy for restoring the Iranian monarchy
- List of heads of state of Iran – a comprehensive list of Iranian heads of state since 1501
- List of royal consorts of Iran – the consorts of the rulers of Iran
- Coronation of the Iranian monarch – the coronations of the rulers of Iran
  - List of Iranian coronations – a comprehensive list of coronations of the rulers of Iran since 1501
- Pishdadian dynasty and Kayanian dynasty – two Iranian dynasties from the Avesta and the Shahnameh
- List of rulers of the pre-Achaemenid kingdoms of Iran – poorly attested regional rulers before the Achaemenid Empire
