= Al-Mu'addal =

Saffarid ruler of Zarang in 911

- Amir of the Saffarid dynasty
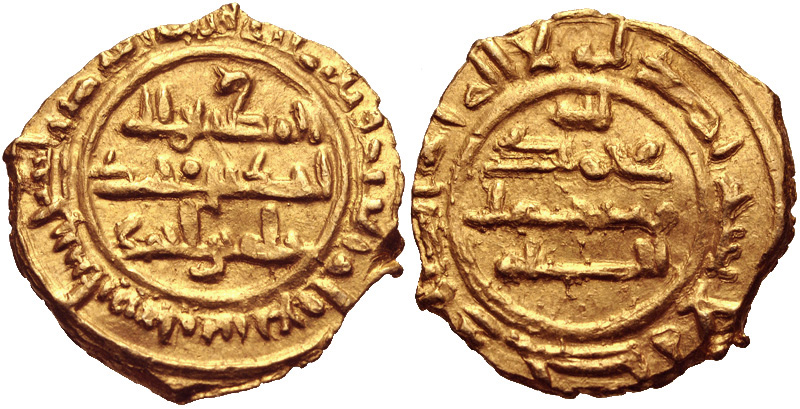
- Coin of Ahmad
- Reign: 911
- Predecessor: Muhammad ibn Ali ibn al-Layth
- Successor: Amr ibn Ya'qub
- House: Saffarids
- Father: Ali ibn al-Layth

Al-Mu'addal ibn Ali ibn al-Layth was the Saffarid ruler of Zarang for a part of 911.

In 890 al-Mu'addal and his brother al-Layth helped their father 'Ali escape from imprisonment at the hands of the latter's uncle, the Saffarid amir Amr ibn al-Layth. The three of them fled to Khurasan, where they entered the services of Rafi' ibn Harthama. After 'Ali died in 893, the brothers continued to serve Rafi'. In 896 they were captured by 'Amr, who however treated them well.

Near the end of 908 al-Layth made a bid for power against 'Amr's son and successor Tahir by occupying part of Zarang. Al-Mu'addal, who had been taken hostage by Tahir, was released in early 909 after Tahir was unable to dislodge al-Layth in an attempt to induce the latter to give up his struggle. Al-Layth maintained his position, however, and Tahir was eventually forced to withdraw.

Al-Layth was now amir, but many were opposed to him. In the east, supporters of Tahir were causing unrest in Zabulistan, while in the west, the Turkish general Sebük-eri had transferred his allegiance from the Saffarids to the Abbasid caliph, resulting in the loss of Fars and Kerman. Al-Mu'addal was sent to restore order to Zabulistan; while doing so he managed to capture a brother of Sebük-eri's named Ghalib. He then moved on to Ghazna and killed a local leader there, but soon encountered stiff resistance and al-Layth was required to send him reinforcements. Despite this, he returned to Sistan near the end of 909 having established the authority of al-Layth in the eastern provinces.

In 910 al-Mu'addal participated in al-Layth's campaign against Sebük-eri; once they entered Fars he was charged with capturing the road to Khuzestan. Sebük-eri soon after managed to defeat and capture al-Layth, however, and al-Mu'addal was forced to flee to Kerman, where he took control of the local treasury before moving on to Sistan. In Zarang, meanwhile, news of al-Layth's fall caused the people to recognize another brother, Muhammad, as amir. In an effort to cement his power, Muhammad imprisoned al-Mu'addal.

Muhammad was subsequently forced to conduct a campaign against the Samanids to the north. After suffering a setback and being forced to end the campaign, his advisors convinced him that he needed al-Mu'addal's support, so he set him free. Al-Mu'addal, however, seized Zarang, forcing Muhammad to go to Bust instead.

Soon afterwards the Samanid Ahmad ibn Isma'il sent an army to take Zarang from the Saffarids. The Samanids arrived before the city in March 911 and initiated a siege. During the siege al-Mu'addal was informed of Ahmad's taking of Bust and his capture of Muhammad. This prompted him to negotiate with the Samanids, and at the end of July 911 he surrendered. Al-Mu'addal's fate was better than that of his predecessors', who had been imprisoned in Baghdad; he was sent by Ahmad to Bukhara and given a monthly stipend. His surrender allowed the Samanids to take control of Sistan.

| Preceded by Al-Layth b. 'Ali | Saffarid Ruler in Zarang; 911 | Succeeded by Amr II |
