= List of Iranian coronations =

This is a list by date of coronations of Iranian monarchs since the establishment of the modern Iranian nation state in 1501.

== Safavid dynasty (1501–1736) ==
Date	Picture	Name	Reign	Consort(s)
2 June 1524		Tahmasp I	23 May 1524 – 25 May 1576	Sultanum Begum; Sultan-Agha Khanum
1588		Abbas the Great	1 October 1587 – 20 January 1629	Yakhan Begum; Princess Marta of Kakheti; Tamar Amilakhori
29 January 1629		Safi	28 January 1629 – 12 May 1642	Anna Khanum
15 May 1642		Abbas II	15 May 1642 – 26 October 1666	Nakihat Khanum
1 November 1666		Suleiman I	1 November 1666 – 29 July 1694	
March 1668		Suleiman I	1 November 1666 – 29 July 1694	
7 August 1694		Soltan Hoseyn	6 August 1694 – 21 October 1722	
7 September 1732		Abbas III	16 April 1732 – 22 January 1736	

== Afsharid dynasty (1736–1796) ==
Date	Picture	Name	Reign	Consort(s)
8 March 1736		Nader Shah	8 March 1736 – 20 June 1747	Razia Begum Safavi

== Qajar dynasty (1794–1925) ==
Date	Picture	Name	Reign	Consort(s)	Ref.
March 1796		Agha Mohammad Khan	1794 – 17 June 1797	Maryam Khanom; Asiya Khanom	
19 March 1798		Fath-Ali Shah	17 June 1797 – 23 October 1834	Badr Jahan Khanum; Asiya Khanum Devellu; Maryam Khanum; Sonbol Baji Khanum; Tavus Khanum (Taj-od-Dowleh); Golbadan Baji Khanum (Khazen-od-Dowleh); More	
14 January 1835		Mohammad Shah	23 October 1834 – 5 September 1848	Malek Jahan Khanom	
21 July 1914		Ahmad Shah	16 July 1909 – 15 December 1925	Badr al-Molouk	

== Pahlavi dynasty (1925–1979) ==
Date	Site	Picture	Name	Reign	Other regnal titles	Consort(s)	Ref.
25 April 1926	Golestan Palace		Reza Shah	15 December 1925 – 16 September 1941	Shahanshah; Bozorg Arteshtaran	Tadj ol-Molouk; Esmat Dowlatshahi	
26 October 1967	Golestan Palace		Mohammad Reza Shah	16 September 1941 – 11 February 1979	Shahanshah; Bozorg Arteshtaran; Aryamehr	Farah Pahlavi	
