= Al-Layth =

Amir of the Saffarid dynasty from 909 to 910

- Amir of the Saffarid dynasty
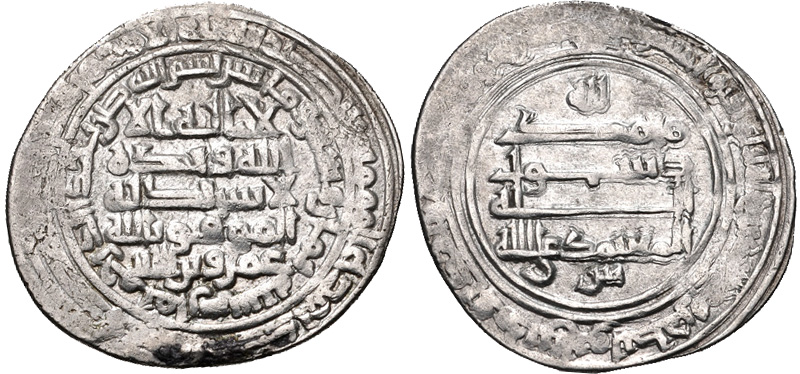
- Coin minted during the reign of Amr ibn al-Layth.
- Reign: 909–910
- Predecessor: Tahir ibn Muhammad ibn Amr
- Successor: Muhammad ibn Ali ibn al-Layth
- House: Saffarid
- Father: Ali ibn al-Layth

Al-Layth ibn Ali ibn al-Layth (died 928) was amir of the Saffarid amirate from 909 until 910. He was the son of Ali ibn al-Layth and nephew of the first two Saffarid rulers, Ya'qub ibn al-Layth and Amr ibn al-Layth.

== Biography ==
In 890 al-Layth and his brother al-Mu'addal helped their father 'Ali escape from imprisonment at the hands of the latter's brother, the Saffarid amir Amr ibn al-Layth. The three of them fled to Khurasan, where they entered the services of the leading anti-Saffarid in that region, Rafi' b. Harthama. 'Ali died in 893, and the brothers continued to serve Rafi'. After Rafi' was defeated and killed in 896 they were captured by 'Amr, who however treated them well.

Following 'Amr's capture by the Samanids in 900, the slave (ghulam) commander Sebük-eri began establishing ties with al-Layth, who had gone into hiding in Sistan. As the son of 'Ali, who had originally been designated as the successor to Ya'qub ibn al-Layth al-Saffar, he was a possible contender for the amirate, and gained supporters in the army. Despite this, he at first remained loyal to 'Amr's successor, Tahir b. Muhammad. He participated in the abortive 900-901 campaign to recover Fars from the Abbasid Caliphate and another more successful campaign that took place in around 904.

For the next few years following reoccupation of Fars, al-Layth accompanied Sebük-eri. In 907 or 908 Sebük-eri sent him on a military expedition against Makran, whose ruler, the Ma'danid 'Isa b. Ma'dan, had not paid tribute due to the Saffarids for the last several years. Al-Layth was able to gain the tribute owed, but when he returned Sebük-eri ordered him back to Makran and took his son hostage in an effort to compel him to obey. Instead, al-Layth launched a rebellion in Kerman, which was administered by Sebük-eri, and gained aid from Tahir, but his army abandoned him when Sebük-eri's force approached. Al-Layth was forced to flee to Sistan with few supporters but a large amount of wealth he had gained from plundering the towns of Kerman.

Al-Layth reached the capital Zarang in late 908 and occupied part of the city, despite Tahir's attempts to dislodge him. Tahir was eventually forced to withdraw from the area, and al-Layth was hailed as amir in March 909. He began his reign by sending an army under the command of his brother to enforce his authority in Afghanistan, which resulted in the capture of Sebük-eri's brother Ghalib. Al-Mu'addal then campaigned in Ghazna and, together with support sent by his brother, imposed al-Layth's authority in parts of Afghanistan by the end of the year.

In February 910 al-Layth left Zarang at the head of an expedition against Sebük-eri. By May he had defeated Sebük-eri on the field and released his son from captivity, and the conquest of Fars proceeded in earnest. Sebük-eri, however, was a caliphal vassal and received support from the Abbasids. Al-Layth's representative in Fars was defeated by Abbasid forces under Mu'nis al-Khadim in August, forcing al-Layth to come to terms, and he left Fars for Kerman. Sebük-eri, however, refused to make peace with the Saffarid, and with Abbasid help he defeated and captured both him and his son; al-Mu'addal managed to escape to Kerman. The captives were sent to Baghdad; al-Layth remained in prison until his death at Raqqa in 928.

Preceded by Tahir ibn Muhammad ibn Amr	Saffarid amir 909–910	Succeeded by Muhammad ibn Ali ibn al-Layth
