= Muhammad ibn Ali ibn al-Layth =

Amir of the Saffarid dynasty from 910 to 911

Muhammad ibn 'Ali ibn al-Layth
- Amir of the Saffarid dynasty
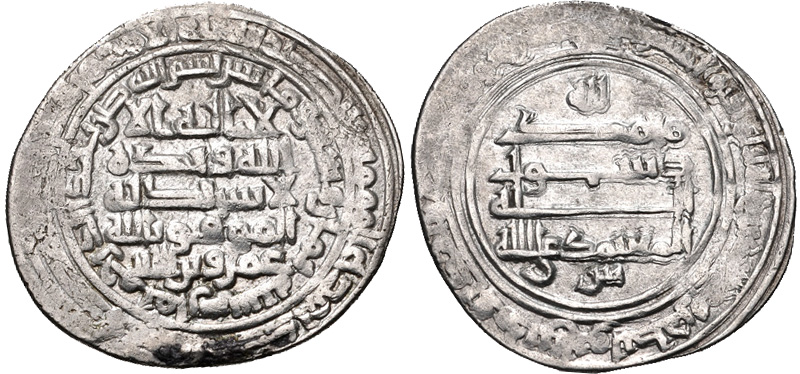
- Coin minted during the reign of Amr ibn al-Layth.
- Reign: 910–911
- Predecessor: Al-Layth
- Successor: Al-Mu'addal
- House: Saffarid
- Father: Ali ibn al-Layth

Muhammad ibn 'Ali ibn al-Layth was amir of the Saffarid emirate from 910 until 911.

Early in 910 Muhammad's brother, the Saffarid amir al-Layth b. 'Ali, led an army west towards Fars in an effort to wrest it from its ruler, the slave commander Sebük-eri. Since both al-Layth and another brother, al-Mu'addal, were participating in the campaign, Muhammad was left behind in the capital Zarang as al-Layth's representative. The campaign ended in disaster, with al-Layth being captured and sent to the Abbasid court at Baghdad; when news of this reached Zarang in early September, Muhammad was hailed as amir in the provinces still part of the amirate. To cement his power, he imprisoned al-Mu'addal, who had managed to avoid being captured by Sebük-eri and had returned to Sistan.

Shortly after his ascension, Muhammad was forced to deal with the Samanids under Ahmad, who had recently been given a caliphal diploma for Sistan and its subordinate territories in an effort to break the power of the Saffarids once and for all. In response to Ahmad building up his forces in Herat, Muhammad raised an army himself. Due to financial constraints, much of the army consisted of peasants. He headed north to the frontier and had some minor engagements with the Samanids in March of 911. However, he was eventually defeated and the peasant contingent fled, forcing him to abandon the expedition.

At this point Muhammad was persuaded by his advisors that he needed the support of al-Mu'addal, who was still in prison. Following his release, al-Mu'addal took control of Zarang, so Muhammad headed to Bust instead. Here a revolt due to excessive taxation by Saffarid authorities had started. It was led by an Ibrahim b. Yusuf-al'Arif, who declared his loyalty to the Samanids. An advance Saffarid army had difficulty putting down the revolt until Ibrahim suddenly disappeared in battle, allowing the Saffarids to retake control of Bust.

Muhammad shortly after entered Bust, but he himself used violently oppressive methods in a desperate attempt to raise money. As a result, the citizens of Bust grew hostile to the Saffarids, and when the Samanid Ahmad arrived before the city, they helped him take it. Muhammad fled but was soon captured and brought back to Bust. In response to the request of the caliph, Ahmad sent Muhammad to Baghdad. His capture, coupled with the surrender of al-Mu'addal to another Samanid army, allowed the Samanids to briefly take over Sistan.

Preceded by al-Layth b. 'Ali	Saffarid amir 910–911	Succeeded by Amr ibn Ya'qub
