= Dulafid dynasty =

- c.800–897/898
- Capital: Karaj
- Common languages: Classical Arabic
- Religion: Sunni Islam
- Government: Emirate
- History
  - Established: c.800
  - Disestablished: 897/898
Preceded by	Succeeded by
Abbasid caliphate	Abbasid caliphate

The Dulafid or Dolafid dynasty (Arabic: الدلفيين) was an Arab dynasty that served as governors of Jibal for the Abbasid caliphs in the 9th century. During the weakening of the authority of the caliphs after 861, their rule in Jibal became increasingly independent of the central government in Samarra. In the last decade of the 9th century, however, they were defeated by the Abbasids who proceeded to reincorporate Jibal into their empire.

== History ==
The Dulafids belonged to the Arab tribe of Banu 'Ijl, who was among the vanguard of the Muslim conquest of Iraq. The exact line of descent of the family is disputed among various sources, but the first members that can be reliably dated were the trader Idris and his brother Isa, sons of Ma'qel, residing in Kufa in the time of the Umayyad caliph Hisham ibn Abd al-Malik (ruled 724–743). The brothers were imprisoned by the Umayyad authorities, but the exact reason is unclear: either a trade dispute, or, according to al-Baladhuri, support for the Abbasid cause. Various sources report even that Abu Muslim, the eventual leader of the Abbasid Revolution, was originally a servant of the Dulafids until he was purchased by the Abbasid family, but these claims may well be later inventions to enhance their standing.

Idris eventually amassed some wealth, and later moved to the Zagros region, buying land at Mass near Hamadan and settling there. His son Isa, however, moved with his sons to Isfahan, where they resorted to highway robbery according to al-Sam'ani. Eventually, sometime in the reign of al-Mahdi (r. 775–785), they adopted a more legitimate lifestyle and settled in Karaj. Over time their holdings around Karaj became extensive, and by the 9th century they possessed large tracts of cultivated land, palaces and fortresses.

The first Dulafid to become governor of Jibal was Isa's son Abu Dulaf al-Ijli, who was appointed to the position by the caliph Harun al-Rashid (r. 786–809). Abu Dulaf was distinguished for his learning, competence and integrity, so that although he sided with Harun al-Rashid's successor al-Amin (r. 809–813) in the civil war against the latter's brother al-Ma'mun (r. 813–832), and despite his well-known Shi'ite beliefs, he was pardoned after the defeat of al-Amin and retained his post. He maintained especially good relations with al-Ma'mun's successor al-Mu'tasim (r. 832–842), serving him both as military commander against the Khurramites and as governor (with a possible appointment to Damascus), and even became the Caliph's drinking companion, and dying in Baghdad in 839/40. His brother Ma'qel was also a member of the Abbasid court, serving as a military commander and earning some distinction as a poet.

Abu Dulaf's long rule firmly established his family's authority in Jibal; the Dulafids received hereditary possession of their domains—known as al-Igharayn, "the two fiefs"—in perpetuity, ruling almost independent of the caliphal government, except for an annual tribute, and with the right to coin their own money. After Abu Dulaf's death, his son Abd al-Aziz succeeded him in his position as governor of Jibal, while another brother, Hisham, served the caliphal court as a general in ca. 865/66. As Abbasid authority in the peripheral provinces broke down in the 860s during the "Anarchy at Samarra", the Dulafids began to act increasingly as independent rulers, prompting the Abbasid government to launch two punitive campaigns in 867, one of which sacked the Dulafid stronghold of Karaj. The fate of Abd al-Aziz is unclear, but he likely remained in his post until his death in 873/74, after which the Abbasids recognized Abd al-Aziz's son Dulaf, and, after Dulaf's death at Isfahan in 878/79, his brother Ahmad, as governors.

Ahmad had a precarious and ambivalent relationship with the central Abbasid government, and played a major role in its relationship with the rising power of the Saffarids. A subject of the Saffarid ruler Amr ibn al-Layth since 879, Ahmad sided with the Abbasids after the break between the Saffarids and the Abbasid regent, al-Muwaffaq, in 884/85. He was appointed to the governorships of Fars and Kirman, and dealt a heavy defeat onto Amr ibn al-Layth in 886, but then faced an invasion of his territory by al-Muwaffaq in 889/90, and was defeated by Amr in the next year. Later, the new Abbasid caliph, al-Mu'tadid (r. 892–902) charged him with taking Rayy from the renegade general Rafi ibn Harthama.

After Ahmad's death in 893, however, al-Mu'tadid swiftly intervened in the succession disputes between Ahmad's sons, Bakr and Umar, to re-establish caliphal authority: in 894, the Caliph visited Jibal in person, and divided the Dulafid territories, giving the governorship of Rayy, Qazvin, Qum and Hamadan to his own son Ali al-Muktafi, while confining Umar to the Dulafid core region around Karaj and Isfahan. Finally, in 896 the Dulafids were deposed outright and a caliphal governor, Isa al-Nushari, was installed at Isfahan. Umar's brothers launched a guerrilla war against the Abbasids for a while, but without success.

The last Dulafid, Abu Layla al-Harith ibn Abd al-Aziz, was killed accidentally with his own sword in a battle in 897/98, bringing the dynasty to an end. According to Tabari, Abu Layla met Isa al-Nushari in battle 12 km from Isfahan on 26 January 898. An arrow pierced his throat, his men fled and his head was sent to Baghdad, reaching the city on March 3rd 898

== Rulers ==
From C. E. Bosworth, The New Islamic Dynasties:

- Abu Dulaf al-Ijli (until c. 840)
- Abd al-Aziz ibn Abu Dulaf (c. 840–874)
- Dulaf ibn Abd al-Aziz (874–879)
- Ahmad ibn Abd al-Aziz (879–893)
- Umar ibn Ahmad ibn Abd al-Aziz (893–896)
- Abu Layla al-Harith ibn Abd al-Aziz (896–897)

== Sources ==
- Bosworth, C.E. (1975). "The Ṭāhirids and Ṣaffārids". In Frye, Richard N. (ed.). The Cambridge History of Iran: From the Arab Invasion to the Saljuqs. Vol. 4. Cambridge: Cambridge University Press. pp. 90–135. ISBN 0-521-20093-8.
- Bosworth, C.E. (1996). The New Islamic Dynasties: A Chronological and Genealogical Manual. New York City: Columbia University Press. ISBN 0-231-10714-5.
- Donner, Fred M. (1995). "DOLAFIDS". In Yarshater, Ehsan (ed.). Encyclopædia Iranica. Vol. VII/5: Divorce IV–Drugs. London and New York: Routledge & Kegan Paul. pp. 476–477. ISBN 978-1-56859-023-3.
- Kennedy, Hugh (2004) [1986]. The Prophet and the Age of the Caliphates: The Islamic Near East from the 6th to the 11th Century (Second ed.). Harlow: Longman. ISBN 978-0-582-40525-7.
- Marin, E. (1965). "Dulafids". In Lewis, B.; Pellat, Ch. & Schacht, J. (eds.). The Encyclopaedia of Islam, Second Edition. Volume II: C–G. Leiden: E. J. Brill. p. 623. OCLC 495469475.
- Ṭabarī (1985). Rosenthal, Franz (ed.). The return of the Caliphate to Baghdad. SUNY series in Near Eastern studies. Albany, New York: State University of New York Press. ISBN 978-0-87395-876-9.
