= Amr ibn Ya'qub =

Amir of Saffarid dynasty from 912 to 913

- Amir of the Saffarid dynasty
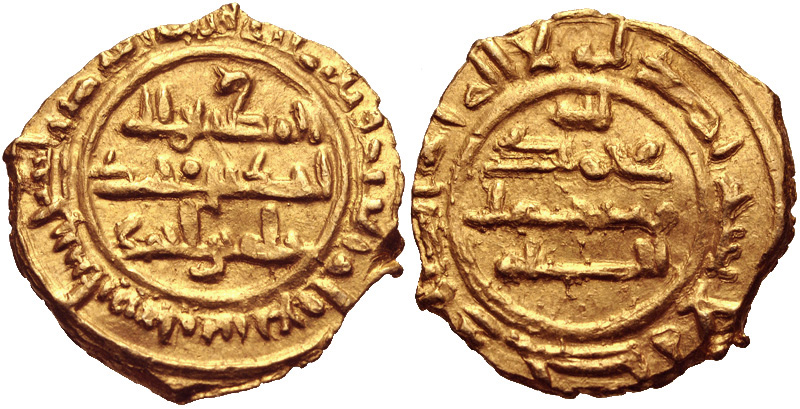
- Coin of Ahmad
- Reign: 912–913
- Predecessor: Al-Mu'addal
- Successor: Abu Ja'far Ahmad ibn Muhammad
- Born: 902/903
- House: Saffarids
- Father: Ya'qub ibn Muhammad ibn Amr

Abu Hafs ‘Amr ibn Ya'qub ibn Muhammad ibn ‘Amr (born 902/903) was the Saffarid amir of Sistan for slightly over a year (912–913). He was the son of Ya'qub, the brother of Tahir ibn Muhammad ibn Amr.

In 912, opposition to the Samanid governor of Sistan Abu Salih Mansur resulted in a revolt. As he was the only surviving member of the Saffarids descended from Ya'qub ibn Layth al-Saffar still in Sistan, the ten-year-old ‘Amr was made the figurehead of the movement. Chief among the leaders of the revolt was Muhammad ibn Hurmuz, a former Kharijite and Samanid soldier, who enlisted the support of the ‘ayyarun, imprisoned Abu Salih Mansur and wrested control of Zarang from the Samanids.

Although ‘Amr was the leader of the rebellion in name, Muhammad b. Hurmuz had no intention of handing power over to him once the Samanids had been driven out of Sistan. He declared himself amir, inserting his name in the Friday prayer and minting his own coins. He was soon opposed, however, by the pro-Saffarid party, led by an Ibn al-Haffar, who took over the Ya'qubi palace and proclaimed ‘Amr as amir on May 2, 912. When Muhammad b. Hurmuz attempted to recover his power he was killed.

‘Amr and Ibn al-Haffar were soon forced to deal with a Samanid invasion launched in an attempt to recover Sistan. The Samanids occupied the outskirts of Zarang but were unable to enter the city. For nine months the Samanids and Saffarids fought around the city; at last on May 24, 913 ‘Amr and Ibn al-Haffar surrendered. Abu Salih Mansur was released, and safe conduct was promised for the defenders, but ‘Amr, Ibn al-Haffar and the ‘ayyar leaders were sent to Herat and then to Bukhara. ‘Amr was sent to Samarkand, while the ‘ayyar leaders were executed.

‘Amr eventually left Samarkand for Baghdad, where the Abbasids gave him refuge. Some time later he was invited back to Sistan by Abu Ja'far Ahmad, who had reestablished Saffarid rule over the province. He was given full honors and the position of redresser of grievances.

Preceded by Al-Mu'addal	Saffarid amir 912–913	Succeeded by Ahmad b. Muhammad
Preceded by Muhammad ibn Hurmuz	Ruler of Sistan; 912–913	Succeeded by Simjur al-Dawati
