= Amr ibn al-Layth =

Amir of the Saffarid dynasty from 879 to 901

- Amir of the Saffarid dynasty
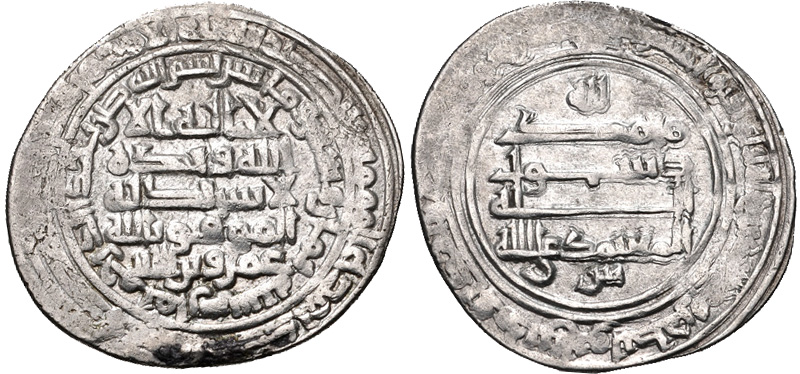
- Coin minted during the reign of Amr ibn al-Layth.
- Reign: 879–901
- Predecessor: Ya'qub ibn al-Layth al-Saffar
- Successor: Tahir ibn Muhammad ibn Amr
- Born: Karnin, modern-day Afghanistan
- Died: 20 or 22 April 902; Cause of Death: Execution; Baghdad
- House: Saffarid
- Father: Layth
- Religion: Sunni Islam

Amr ibn al-Layth or Amr-i Laith Saffari (Persian: عمرو لیث صفاری) was the second ruler of the Saffarid dynasty of Iran from 879 to 901. He was the son of a whitesmith and the younger brother of the dynasty's founder, Ya'qub ibn al-Layth al-Saffar.

== Biography ==
Said to have started as a mule-driver and a mason, he later fought alongside his older brother and in 875 became governor of Herat. When Ya'qub died in Fars in 879, Amr managed to become the successor of the Saffarid throne over his brother Ali ibn al-Layth, who was the preferred choice of both Ya'qub and the army. He instituted a building program in Nishapur which included a Friday mosque.

In 884, the Bavandid ruler Rustam I, after being repelled from Mazandaran by the Zaydi ruler Muhammad ibn Zayd, arrived to the court of Amr, and requested his aid to reclaim the Bavand throne. With the aid of Amr, Rustam was allowed to return to his domains in Mazandaran.

The Caliph al-Mu'tadid (r. 892–902) was forced to acknowledge the reality of the Saffarids' domination in the East, and reached a modus vivendi with them, perhaps hoping, according to Hugh N. Kennedy, to harness them in a partnership analogous to that which the Tahirids had enjoyed in previous decades. Consequently, the Saffarids were recognized in their possession of Khurasan and eastern Persia as well as Fars, while the Abbasids were to exercise direct control over Jibal, Ray and Isfahan.

The Abbasid–Saffarid partnership in Iran was most clearly expressed against the intrepid general Rafi ibn Harthama, who had made his base in Ray and posed a threat to both caliphal and Saffarid interests in the region. Al-Mu'tadid sent the Dulafid Ahmad ibn Abd al-Aziz to seize Ray from Rafi, who fled and made common cause with the Zaydis of Tabaristan in an effort to conquer Khurasan from the Saffarids. With Amr mobilizing anti-Alid sentiment against him and the expected assistance from the Zaydis failing to materialize, Rafi was defeated and killed in Khwarazm in 896. Amr, at the pinnacle of his power, sent the defeated rebel's head to Baghdad. In 897 Ray too was handed over to the Saffarids by the Abbasids, who could not manage to hold the city against Zaydi invasions.

Aufi states that Amr had sent Fardaghan as the prefect over Ghazni and he launched the raid on Sakawand, which was a part of the territory of Kabul Shahi and had a temple frequented by Hindus. The Shah of Kabul at this time was Kamaluka, called "Kamalu" in Persian literature. Fardaghan entered it and succeeded in surprising Sakawand. Sakawand was plundered, and its temple destroyed.

Kamalu counter-attacked Fardaghan, who realising his forces were no match for his, resorted to spreading a false rumour that he knew his intentions and had organised a formidable army against him with 'Amr on the way to join him. The rumour had the desired effect and the opposing army slowed its advance, knowing that they could be ambushed and slaughtered if they advanced impetuously into the narrow defiles. Meanwhile, Fardaghan received reinforcements from Khorasan according to Aufi. According to Aufi, he cleverly averted the danger.

== Death ==
The partnership finally collapsed after al-Mu'tadid named Amr ibn al-Layth governor of Transoxiana in 898, which was ruled by his rivals, the Samanids. Al-Mu'tadid encouraged Amr to confront the Samanids, but in the event, Amr was crushingly defeated and taken prisoner in 900. The Samanid ruler, Isma'il ibn Ahmad, sent him in chains to Baghdad, where he was executed in 902, after al-Mu'tadid's death. Al-Mu'tadid in turn conferred Amr's titles to Isma'il ibn Ahmad, but the Saffarid remnant under Tahir proved sufficiently resilient to thwart the caliphal attempts at regaining Fars and Kirman for several more years. It was not until 910 that the Abbasids managed to regain the coveted Fars province.

According to the contemporary historian al-Tabari, at his deathbed, al-Mu'tadid had ordered one of his servants, Safi al-Hurami, to execute Amr. Safi, however, did not do it. When the new Caliph, al-Muktafi, entered Baghdad, he asked the vizier, al-Qasim ibn Ubayd Allah, of Amr's whereabouts, and was overjoyed to hear that he was still alive, as the Saffarid had been generous and kind to him in the past. Fearing that the Caliph might release him, on the same day or soon after (20 or 22 April 902), the vizier sent one of his agents secretly to kill him.

== Sources ==
- Barthold, W. (1960). "ʿAmr b. al-Layth". In Gibb, H. A. R.; Kramers, J. H.; Lévi-Provençal, E.; Schacht, J.; Lewis, B. & Pellat, Ch. (eds.). The Encyclopaedia of Islam, Second Edition. Volume I: A–B. Leiden: E. J. Brill. pp. 452–453. OCLC 495469456.
- Bosworth, C.E. (1975). "The Ṭāhirids and Ṣaffārids". In Frye, R.N. (ed.). The Cambridge History of Iran, Volume 4: From the Arab Invasion to the Saljuqs. Cambridge: Cambridge University Press. pp. 90–135. ISBN 0-521-20093-8.
- Bonner, Michael (2010). "The waning of empire, 861–945". In Robinson, Chase F. (ed.). The New Cambridge History of Islam, Volume 1: The Formation of the Islamic World, Sixth to Eleventh Centuries. Cambridge: Cambridge University Press. pp. 305–359. ISBN 978-0-521-83823-8.
- Kennedy, Hugh N. (1993). "al-Muʿtaḍid Bi'llāh". In Bosworth, C. E.; van Donzel, E.; Heinrichs, W. P. & Pellat, Ch. (eds.). The Encyclopaedia of Islam, Second Edition. Volume VII: Mif–Naz. Leiden: E. J. Brill. pp. 759–760. ISBN 978-90-04-09419-2.
- Kennedy, Hugh N. (2004). The Prophet and the Age of the Caliphates: The Islamic Near East from the 6th to the 11th Century (Second ed.). Harlow, UK: Pearson Education Ltd. ISBN 0-582-40525-4.
- Mottahedeh, Roy (1975). "The ʿAbbāsid Caliphate in Iran". In Frye, R.N. (ed.). The Cambridge History of Iran, Volume 4: From the Arab Invasion to the Saljuqs. Cambridge: Cambridge University Press. pp. 57–89. ISBN 9780521200936.
- Madelung, W. (1993). "DĀʿĪ ELAʾL-ḤAQQ, ABŪ ʿABD ALLĀH MOḤAMMAD". In Yarshater, Ehsan (ed.). Encyclopaedia Iranica, Vol. VI, Fasc. 6. London et al.: Routledge & Kegan Paul. pp. 595–597. ISBN 1568590075.
- Rosenthal, Franz, ed. (1985). The History of al-Ṭabarī, Volume XXXVIII: The Return of the Caliphate to Baghdad: The Caliphates of al-Muʿtaḍid, al-Muktafī and al-Muqtadir, A.D. 892–915/A.H. 279–302. SUNY Series in Near Eastern Studies. Albany, New York: State University of New York Press. ISBN 978-0-87395-876-9.
- Wilkinson, Charles Kyrle (1987). Nishapur: Some Early Islamic Buildings and Their Decoration. Metropolitan Museum of Art.

Preceded by Ya'qub ibn al-Layth al-Saffar	Saffarid amir 879–901	Succeeded by Tahir ibn Muhammad ibn Amr
