= Tahir ibn Muhammad ibn Amr =

Amir of the Saffarid dynasty from 901 to 909

- Amir of the Saffarid dynasty
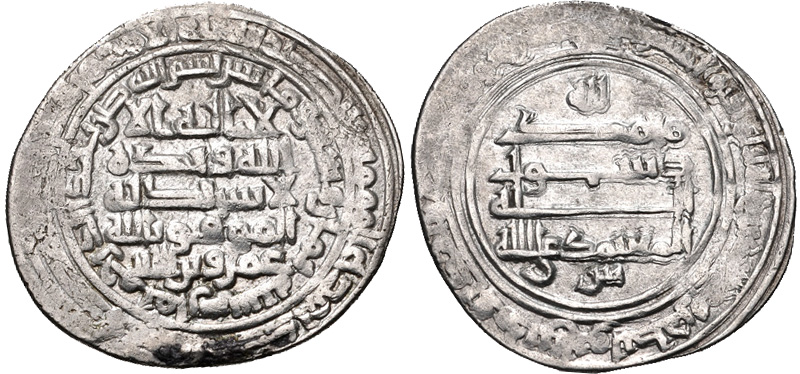
- Coin minted during the reign of Amr ibn al-Layth.
- Reign: 901–909
- Predecessor: Amr ibn al-Layth
- Successor: Al-Layth
- Born: 883
- Died: Baghdad
- House: Saffarid
- Father: Muhammad ibn Amr

Abu'l-Hasan Tahir ibn Muhammad ibn Amr (883 – after 909) was amir of the Saffarid amirate from 901 until 909. He was the son of Muhammad ibn Amr.

== Biography ==
During Tahir's early life, he served as the governor of Marw during the reign of his grandfather Amr ibn al-Layth.

In 900, Amr ibn al-Layth, was captured by the Samanids while campaigning against them in Khurasan. The Saffarid army swore loyalty to Tahir, who soon afterwards effectively made his brother Abu Yusuf Ya'qub his co-ruler, although the khutba continued to be made in 'Amr's name until late 901. Tahir and Ya'qub returned to Sistan, reaching Zarang in May of that year. From the onset of his reign, Tahir and his brother were under the thumb of the Turkish slave commander Sebük-eri, who managed to destroy Tahir's vizier and replace him with one more to his liking.

Tahir spent much of his time early in his reign in the western part of his territories, having to deal with the occupation of Fars by the Abbasid Caliph al-Mu'tadid after the downfall of 'Amr. A 900-901 campaign, in which both Tahir and Sebük-eri participated, temporarily regained Fars, but the Saffarids withdrew soon afterwards. A second campaign resulted in a caliphal grant of the province to Tahir, although both Fars and Kerman effectively fell into the hands of Sebük-eri.

After the second Fars campaign, Tahir returned to Zarang (mid-904). At this point both he and Ya'qub gave themselves over to lives of pleasure and excesses. Over the next few years the two brothers began to lose the confidence of the people, and although the government bureaucracy continued to function, the stability of the provinces declined as rival factions opposed each other. By 905 Sebük-eri stopped forwarding taxes collected in Fars and Kerman to Zarang. Tahir responded by leading an army against Fars, but was soon persuaded to abort the expedition and return to Sistan, having accomplished nothing.

In late 908 another Saffarid, al-Laith b. 'Ali, arrived at Zarang with a small army and occupied part of the city. Tahir, who had been in Bust, joined up with Ya'qub and besieged al-Laith's position. Despite reinforcements from Sebük-eri, however, he was unable to dislodge al-Laith and began to suffer from having very little money to maintain the support of those around him, thanks to declining government revenues. Tahir and Ya'qub decided to flee to Sebük-eri. On the way, however, they grew distrustful of the Turkish commander and decided to fight him. The two sides met in June 909; Sebük-eri, who had managed to win over Tahir's commanders, won an easy victory and captured the brothers. They were sent to the Caliph and imprisoned in Baghdad, though they were treated well for the remainder of their lives.

| Preceded by Amr ibn al-Layth | Saffarid amir 901–908 | Succeeded by Al-Layth ibn 'Ali |
