= Muhammad ibn Wasif =

9th-century Iranian poet and secretary

Muḥammad ibn Waṣīf (Persian: محمد بن وصیف; died 909 CE) was an Iranian poet and secretary who flourished in the 9th century in the service of the Saffarid dynasty of Sistan. He is considered to be author of one of the earliest works of poetry in Early New Persian according to the regulations of Arabic quantitative metre (sc. ʿarūḍ).

Fragments of four of Wasif's poems, probably qasidas, are cited in the Tarikh-i Sistan. The anonymous author of the Tarikh-i Sistan mentions that the first of the poems had been written by Wasif around the time of Ya'qub ibn al-Layth al-Saffar's (r. 861–879) conquest of Herat in 867 or his killing of the Kharijite Ammar two years earlier in 865. According to the same author, Wasif had written the poem as Ya'qub could not understand the panegyrics addressed to him in Arabic by his court poets.

Wasif's career lasted for over fifty years, as the last fragment in the Tarikh-i Sistan mentions the captivity of Amr ibn al-Layth's (r. 879–901) two grandsons Tahir and Ya'qub in 908/9.

Wasif died in 909.

== Sources ==
- Bosworth, C.E. (1993). "Muḥammad b. Waṣīf". In Bosworth, C. E.; van Donzel, E.; Heinrichs, W. P. & Pellat, Ch. (eds.). The Encyclopaedia of Islam, Second Edition. Volume VII: Mif–Naz. Leiden: E. J. Brill. ISBN 978-90-04-09419-2.
- Green, Nile (2019). "Introduction: The Frontiers of the Persianate World (ca. 800-1900)". In Green, Nile (ed.). The Persianate World: The Frontiers of a Eurasian Lingua Franca. University of California Press. p. 42. ISBN 978-0520972100.
- Paul, Ludwig (2000). "PERSIAN LANGUAGE i. Early New Persian". In Yarshater, Ehsan (ed.). Encyclopædia Iranica (Online ed.). Encyclopædia Iranica Foundation.
