= Al-Harith ibn Sima al-Sharabi =

Abbasid governor of Fars (869–870)

Al-Harith ibn Sima al-Sharabi الحارث بن سيما الشرابي

Governor of Fars
- In office 869–870
- Monarchs: al-Muhtadi, al-Mu'tamid

Personal details
- Died: c. 870 Fars, Abbasid Caliphate
- Parent: Sima al-Sharabi (father)

Al-Harith ibn Sima al-Sharabi (Arabic: الحارث بن سيما الشرابي) (died 870) was the governor of Fars for the Abbasid Caliphate from 869 until his death.

== Career ==
Al-Harith's appointment to Fars came in the aftermath of the Saffarid amir Ya'qub ibn al-Layth's recent forced entry into Shiraz, the provincial capital. Ya'qub's subsequent departure from Fars allowed the caliphal government to briefly reestablish their authority over the province, and al-Harith and other officials arrived to take control of local affairs.

Al-Harith's governorship was brief. He was soon challenged by a local Kharijite, Muhammad ibn Wasil. The two sides engaged each other in battle and al-Harith was killed; Muhammad then seized control of Fars.

== Bibliography ==
- Bosworth, C. E. The History of the Saffarids of Sistan and the Maliks of Nimruz (247/861 to 949/1542-3). Costa Mesa, California: Mazda Publishers, 1994. ISBN 1-56859-015-6.
- Al-Tabari, Abu Ja'far Muhammad ibn Jarir. The History of al-Tabari. Ed. Ehsan Yar-Shater. 40 vols. Albany, NY: State University of New York Press, 1985–2007.
- Tor, D. G. Violent Order: Religious War, Chivalry, and the 'Ayyar Phenomenon in the Medieval Islamic World. Würzburg: Ergon, 2007. ISBN 3-89913-553-9.
