= Battle of al-Baida =

Date	874 or 875
Location	al-Baida, near Shiraz, present-day Iran
Result	Saffarid victory

Belligerents
Kharijites	Saffarid dynasty

Commanders and leaders
Muhammad ibn Wasil (POW)	Ya'qub ibn al-Layth

Strength
30,000	15,000

The Battle of al-Baida or Lake Bakhtegan was fought in 874 or 875. The Saffarids under Ya'qub ibn al-Layth defeated the Kharijite leader Muhammad ibn Wasil.

Ya'qub ibn al-Layth invaded Fars and advanced to Estakhr, seizing Muhammad's treasuries there. Muhammad departed from Khuzestan, and returned to Fars in an attempt to stop Ya'qub. They met near Lake Bakhtegan in August 875, and in the resulting battle, Muhammad, despite having a numerically superior army, was defeated. Muhammad was forced to flee; Ya'qub looted Muhammad's stronghold at Sa'idabad and took control of Fars.
