= Muhammad ibn Wasil =

9th-century Arab military adventurer

Muhammad bin Wasil ibn Ibrahim al-Tamimi (Arabic: محمد بن واصل بن إبراهيم التميمي) (also known as al-Hanzali) was a military adventurer who seized control of the Abbasid province of Fars in 870. He intermittently ruled over Fars until 876, when he was captured and imprisoned by Ya'qub ibn al-Layth, the Saffarid emir of Sistan.

== Early career ==
Muhammad was a member of an Arab family that had a long association with Kharijism. In 837 he took command of a group of Kharijites at Bost, and revolted against the Abbasid authorities. His forces were able to defeat the governor of Sistan's army and to capture its leader, the governor's son. Muhammad eventually released him after negotiations with the governor; he subsequently left the region of Bost and made his way to Kerman, which was home to a number of other Kharijite outlaws.

== Rule of Fars ==
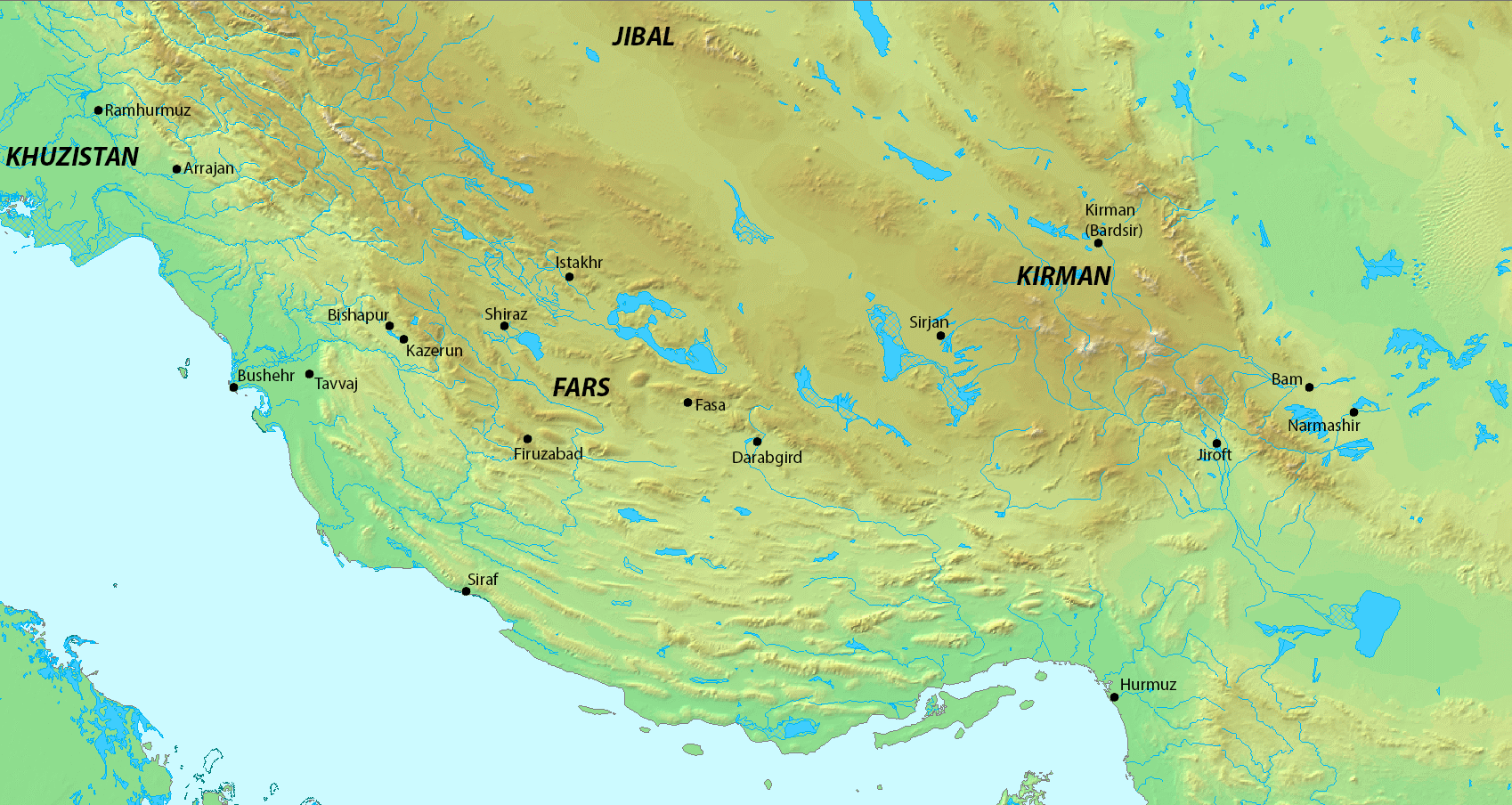
Map of Fars and its surrounding regions in the 9th–10th centuries

Subsequent to his activities in the east, Muhammad moved to the province of Fars. In 870, with caliphal control over Fars having been weakened by years of disorder, he decided to rebel against the government. He allied with the leader of the local Kurds, and together they defeated and killed the provincial governor, al-Harith ibn Sima. As a result of this victory, Abbasid rule in Fars collapsed, and Muhammad was able to take control of the province.

Less than a year after his takeover of Fars, Muhammad was threatened by Ya'qub ibn al-Layth, the self-made emir of Sistan. Ya'qub set out west for Fars with the intention of subjugating the province. Sources disagree on what happened next, but Ya'qub was eventually dissuaded from continuing his expedition, and he turned back toward Sistan. His withdrawal is described as having been caused either by Muhammad's submission to him, or by the arrival of emissaries sent by the caliphal government to convince him to abandon his westward advance. In either case, Muhammad soon afterwards reached a rapprochement with the central government, and in 872 he handed over the kharaj (tax revenues), and possibly the government of Fars, to a caliphal representative.

The amicable state of relations between Muhammad and the caliphal government did not last, and soon Muhammad reverted to his earlier opposition to Abbasid authority. In 875, Musa ibn Bugha, who had been given responsibility for Fars by the central government, sent an army under the command of 'Abd al-Rahman ibn Muflih to establish a firm Abbasid presence in the province. When Muhammad learned of this development, he advanced toward Khuzestan and reportedly met the caliphal army at Ramhormoz. The two sides engaged in combat, and Muhammad was victorious; Ibn Muflih's lieutenant, Tashtimur, was killed, and Ibn Muflih was captured by Muhammad's forces. The central government sent an envoy to secure Ibn Muflih's release, but Muhammad refused their offers and executed the general. Muhammad then announced his intention of marching against Musa ibn Bugha, and advanced to al-Ahwaz. Musa, recognizing his inability to control the situation, resigned his governorship and transferred responsibility for Fars to the caliphal regent, al-Muwaffaq.

Muhammad's campaign in the west came to a sudden end with the news that Ya'qub ibn al-Layth had once again advanced from Sistan. This time, he invaded Fars and advanced to Estakhr, seizing Muhammad's treasuries there. Muhammad departed from Khuzestan, and returned to Fars in an attempt to stop Ya'qub. They met near Lake Bakhtegan in August 875, and in the resulting battle, Muhammad, despite having a numerically superior army, was defeated. Muhammad was forced to flee; Ya'qub looted Muhammad's stronghold at Sa'idabad and took control of Fars.

In the aftermath of his defeat, Muhammad once again turned to the Abbasids, and managed to restore himself to favor with the central government. Ya'qub, meanwhile, continued marching west, moving first through Khuzestan and then pressing into Iraq. His advance brought him close to Baghdad and the Abbasid capital of Samarra, but in April 876 he was defeated by a caliphal army led by al-Muwaffaq at the Battle of Dayr al-'Aqul. Ya'qub's invasion of core Abbasid territory alienated the government against him, and after the amir's defeat, Muhammad was appointed to Fars as a caliphal governor in opposition to Ya'qub.

Muhammad's governorship over Fars was short-lived. Even before his formal investment as governor, he had returned to the province and gathered supporters to his cause. Ya'qub, however, despite his defeat at the hands of the Abbasids, still had the strength to reassert his authority within Fars, and when the two enemies began fighting, Muhammad soon found himself unable to maintain his position. When he realized his cause was lost, he attempted to flee from Fars, heading along the coast as far as the port city of Siraf, but after a year he was captured by the Saffarid army, and imprisoned.

Muhammad's ultimate fate is not explicitly stated by the historians. According to one account, Muhammad remained in confinement for two years before a revolt in the prison compound was violently suppressed by Ya'qub's soldiers; after this, Muhammad disappears from the sources.
