= Gundeshapur =

Sassanid city in Dezful County, Iran

- 𐭥𐭧𐭩𐭠𐭭𐭣𐭩𐭥𐭪𐭱𐭧𐭯𐭥𐭧𐭥𐭩 (Middle Persian) گندی‌شاپور (Persian)
- Weh-Antiyok-Shapur
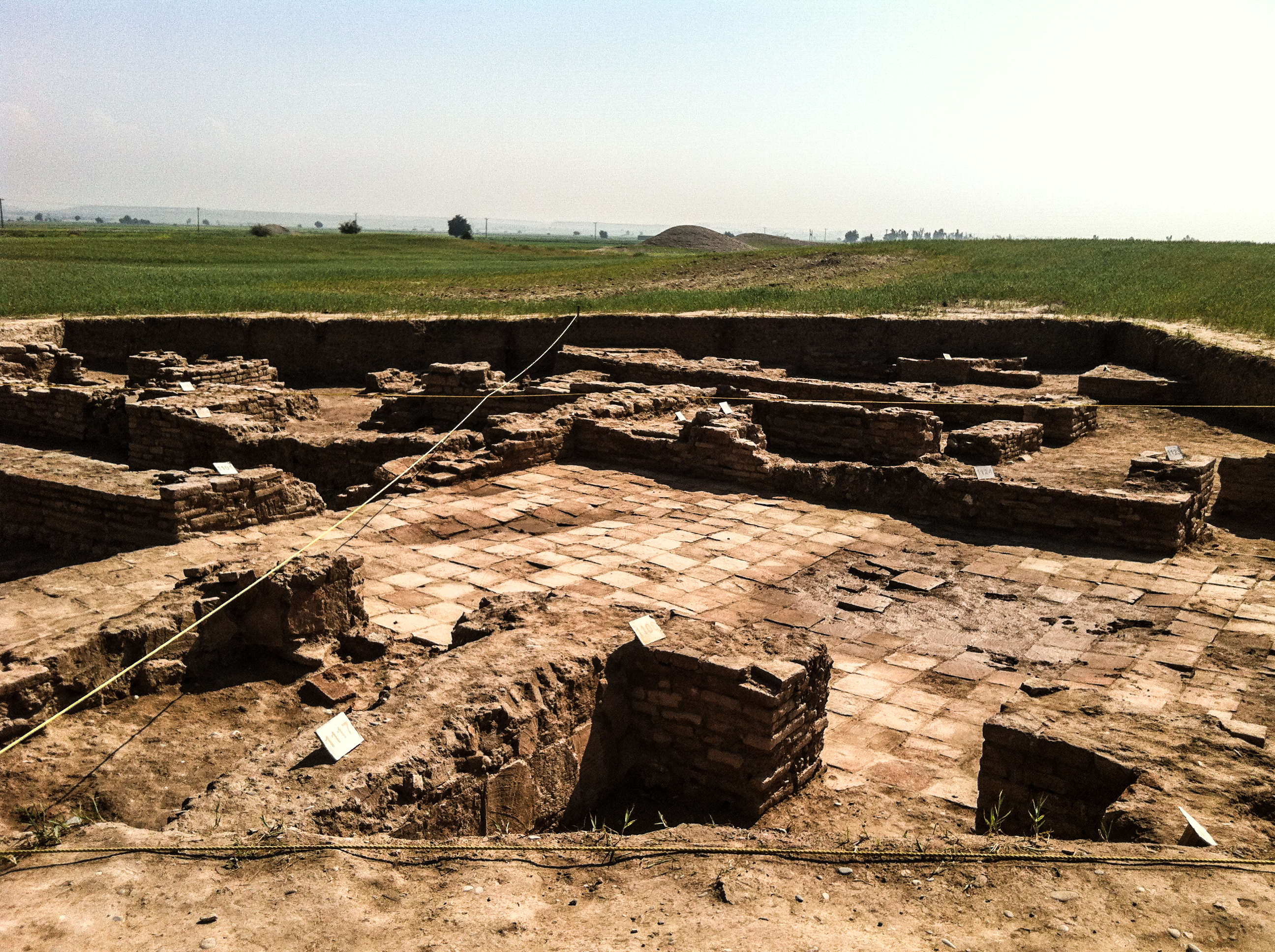
- The ruins of Gundeshapur

- Location within Iran
- 32°17′N 48°31′E
- Type: Settlement
- Periods: Late antiquity to Middle Ages
- Cultures: Iranian, Assyrian, Greco-Roman
- Location: Khuzestan Province, Iran
- Region: Iranian plateau
- Part of: Sasanian Empire

History
- Built: 3rd-century CE

Site notes
- Condition: Ruined

Iran National Heritage List
- Official name: Gundeshapur
- Type: Ruins
- Designated: 1931
- Reference no.: 46
- Conservation organization: Cultural Heritage, Handicrafts and Tourism Organization of Iran

Gundeshapur or Gondishapur or Jundishapur (Middle Persian: 𐭥𐭧𐭩𐭠𐭭𐭣𐭩𐭥𐭪𐭱𐭧𐭯𐭥𐭧𐭥𐭩, Weh-Andiōk-Ŝābuhr; Classical Persian: گندی‌شاپور Gundēšāpūr; modern Iranian Persian: گندی‌شاپور Gondišâpur) was the intellectual centre of the Sasanian Empire founded by the Sasanian emperor Shapur I. Gundeshapur was home to a teaching hospital and had a library and an ancient higher-learning institution, the Academy of Gondishapur, which was the first and oldest university in human history. It has been identified with extensive ruins south of Jandi Shapur, a village 14 km southeast of Dezful, along the road to Shushtar in Khuzestan province in southwestern Iran.

The city declined after the Muslim conquest of Persia; the city surrendered in 638. It continued to remain an essential centre in the Islamic period. Ya'qub ibn al-Layth al-Saffar, the founder of the Saffarid dynasty, made Gundeshapur his residence three years before his sudden death in 879. His tomb became one of the most prominent sites in the city.

== Name ==
The Middle Persian word Gondēšāhpūr (or Gonde Šāhpur) may be from the Persian expression wandēw Šāhpur, means "acquired by Shapur", or from Gund-dēz-ī Shāpūr, means "military fortress of Shapur", or from Weh-Andiyok-Shāpūr, "Better-than-Antioch of Shapur", or literally "better than Antioch, Shapur [built this]". It is known as Gondēshāpūr (گندی‌شاپور) in New Persian.

In Syriac, the town was called ܒܝܬ ܠܦܛ Bēth Lapaṭ, sometimes rendered as Bethlapeta in English, in Greek Bendosabora; and in Arabic: جنديسابور, romanized: Jundaysābūr.

== The rise of Gundeshapur ==
After his conquest of the Roman city of Antioch in 256, the Sasanian King of Kings (shahanshah) Shapur I founded the city of Gundeshapur, situated between Susa and Shushtar. The city, constructed as a place to settle Roman prisoners of war, subsequently became a Sasanian royal winter residence and the capital of the Khuzistan province. Gundeshapur was one of the four main cities of the province, along with Susa, Karka d-Ledan, and Shushtar. Gundeshapur was mainly inhabited by Christians, and served as the East-Syrian metropolitan see of Bet Huzaye.

Most scholars believe Shāpur I, son of Ardashir I (Artaxexes), founded the city after defeating a Roman army led by Emperor Valerian. Gundeshapur was a garrison town and housed many Roman prisoners of war. Shāpur I made Gundeshapur his capital.

In 489, the Eastern Christian theological and scientific center in Edessa was ordered closed by the Byzantine emperor Zeno, and relocated as the School of Nisibis or Nisibīn, then under Persian rule with its secular faculties at Gundeshapur. Here, scholars, together with pagan philosophers banished from Athens by Justinian I in 529, carried out significant research in medicine, astronomy, and mathematics".

Under the rule of Emperor Khosrow I (531-579), called Anushiravan "The Immortal" and known to the Greeks and Romans as 'Chosroes', Gundeshapur became known for medicine and erudition. Khusraw I gave refuge to various Greek philosophers and Eastern Christian Assyrians fleeing religious persecution by the Byzantine Empire.

The emperor commissioned the refugees to translate Greek and Syriac texts into Middle Persian. They translated various works on medicine, astronomy, astrology, philosophy, and practical crafts.

Anushiravan also turned eastwards and sent the famous physician Borzuya to invite Indian and Chinese scholars to Gundeshapur. These visitors translated Indic texts on astronomy, astrology, mathematics, and medicine, as well as Chinese texts on herbal medicine and religion. Borzouye is said to have himself translated the still popular Indic Pañcatantra from Sanskrit into New Persian as Kalīla wa-Dimna.

Many Assyrians settled in Gundeshapur during the fifth century. The Assyrians were primarily physicians from Urfa, which was, at that time, home to the leading medical center. Teaching in the Academy of Gundeshapur was done in Syriac until the city fell in the early Muslim conquests, which destroyed the city and places of learning.

== Gundeshapur under Arab-Islamic rule ==
The Sasanian Empire fell to the Rashidun Caliphate in 638. The academy survived the change of rulers and continued to operate for several centuries as a Muslim institution of higher learning. In 832, Caliph Al-Ma'mun founded the House of Wisdom. There, the methods of Gundeshapur were emulated, as the House of Wisdom was staffed with graduates of the older Academy of Gundeshapur, who had been heavily trained in Indic, as well as some Greek and Iranian medical traditions. It is believed that the House of Wisdom was disbanded under al-Mutawakkil, al-Ma'mūn's successor, who felt learning conflicted with the information given in the Quran. In addition, the intellectual center of the Abbasid Caliphate had shifted to the Arab stronghold of Baghdad, and henceforth there are few references in contemporary literature to universities or hospitals at Gundeshapur.

Gundeshapur had been major link between Indian and Greek medicine because of its previous practices of combining the medical traditions, therefore the transition from earlier ancient civilisations to later Islamic appropriation was more coherent.

The last attested head of the Gundeshapur hospital was Sābur bin Sahl, who died in 869. The fate of the hospital after this is unknown.

== Recent academic doubts ==
Some scholars have cast doubts on the existence of the hospital at Gundeshapur by claiming that there are no known surviving Persian sources "that would corroborate the claims that [Gundeshapur] played a crucial role in medical history". It has been assumed that a medical center at Gundeshapur would have resembled the School of Nisibis. What is more likely is that there was a seminary like the one in Nisibis where medical texts were read, and an infirmary, where medicine was practiced.

Additionally, Gundeshapur's reputation may have been conflated with that of Susa, a city to the west of Gundeshapur and with which Gundesahur was administratively linked. Ath-Tha'ālibi, a scholar with access to Sassanian royal annals, discussing pre-Islamic Persia, wrote:

Thus, the people of Sūs [Susa] became the most skilled in medicine of the people of Ahwāz and Fārs because of their learning from the Indian doctor [who was brought to Susa by Shāhpūr I] and from the Greek prisoners who lived close to them; then [the medical knowledge] was handed down from generation to generation.

On the other hand, the same source might be another confirmation of the medical reputation of Gundeshapur, as Susa may represent the whole local region, which included Gundeshapur (as they were administratively linked). This is supported by the fact that Ahwāz (Khuzestan) and Fārs (now Fars province), mentioned.

== See also ==
- Academy of Gundeshapur
- Science in Persia
- List of hospitals in Iran
- School of Nisibis
- Sarouyeh

== Notes ==
=== References ===
- Dols, Michael W. (1987). "The Origins of the Islamic Hospital: Myth and Reality". Bulletin of the History of Medicine. 61 (3): 367–391. PMID 3311248.
- Fiori, Emiliano (2015). "Jundīshāpūr". In Fleet, Kate; Krämer, Gudrun; Matringe, Denis; Nawas, John; Rowson, Everett (eds.). Encyclopaedia of Islam (3rd ed.). Brill Online. ISSN 1873-9830.
- Frye, Richard Nelson (1975a). The Golden Age of Persia. London: Weidenfeld & Nicolson.
- Frye, Richard Nelson, ed. (1975b). The Cambridge History of Iran. Vol. 4. Cambridge: Cambridge University Press.
- Hill, Donald (1993). Islamic Science and Engineering. Edinburgh: Edinburgh University Press.
- Jalalipour, Saeid (2015). "The Arab Conquest of Persia: The Khūzistān Province before and after the Muslims Triumph" (PDF). Sasanika.
- McDonough, Scott (2011). "The Legs of the Throne: Kings, Elites, and Subjects in Sasanian Iran". In Arnason, Johann P.; Raaflaub, Kurt A. (eds.). The Roman Empire in Context: Historical and Comparative Perspectives. John Wiley & Sons, Ltd. pp. 290–321. doi:10.1002/9781444390186.ch13. ISBN 978-1-4443-9018-6.
- Shahbazi, A. Shapur; Richter-Bernburg, Lutz (2002). "Gondēšāpur". In Yarshater, Ehsan (ed.). Encyclopædia Iranica. Vol. XI/2: Golšani–Great Britain IV. London and New York: Routledge & Kegan Paul. pp. 131–135. ISBN 978-0-933273-62-7.
