= Abu Ja'far Ahmad ibn Muhammad =

Amir of the Saffarid dynasty from 923 to 963

Ahmad ibn Muhammad
- Amir of the Saffarid dynasty
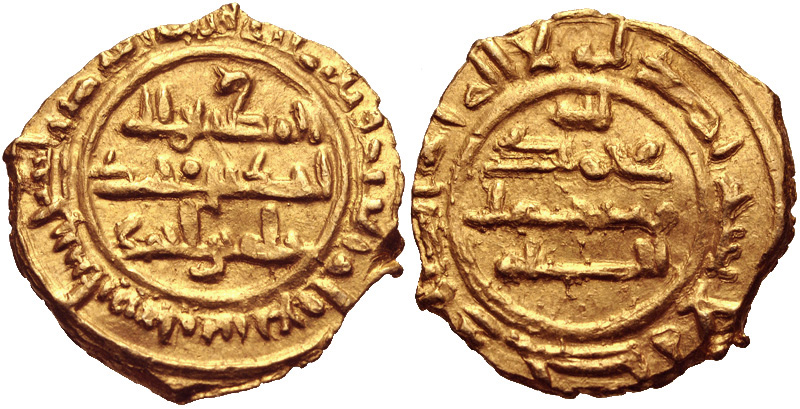
- Coin of Ahmad
- Reign: 923–963
- Predecessor: Amr ibn Ya'qub
- Successor: Khalaf ibn Ahmad
- Died: March 963; Zarang
- House: Saffarids
- Father: Muhammad ibn Khalaf
- Religion: Sunni Islam

Abu Ja'far Ahmad ibn Muhammad (June 21, 906 – March 31, 963) was the amir of Sistan from 923 until his death in 963. He is responsible for restoring Saffarid rule over Sistan, and was a great patron of the arts.

== Ancestors ==
Abu Ja’far Ahmad's father was named Muhammad. Muhammad was very distantly related to the founder of the Saffarid amirate, Ya'qub-i Laith Saffari; his great-great-grandfather had been the brother of Ya’qub's great-grandfather. Muhammad shared a closer connection with Ya’qub's brother and successor Amr bin Laith, having married the latter's granddaughter.

== Life ==
Abu Ja’far Ahmad's rise to power began in May 923, when the people of Zarang proclaimed him amir. Sistan at that time was ruled by 'Abdallah ibn Ahmad, who was unpopular in Zarang due to his harsh taxes. Taking advantage of his ties to the Saffarids, Abu Ja’far Ahmad gained the support of the city ‘ayyars, who stopped an attempt by ‘Abdallah's son ‘Aziz to maintain control of the town. Abu Ja’far Ahmad's rule soon expanded outside Zarang; ‘Abdallah's representative in al-Rukhkhaj defected to him and the citizens of Bust threw their support behind the Saffarid as well. ‘Abdallah was defeated in battle by Abu Ja’far Ahmad's supporters, forcing him to make for Samanid Khurasan. He was captured, however, and brought back to Zarang in October 923. His capture ended his rule for good.

Although ‘Abdallah was no longer a threat to Abu Ja’far Ahmad, his son ‘Aziz remained opposed to him. Some of Abu Ja’far Ahmad's supporters turned against him and threw their support behind ‘Aziz, forcing the Saffarid to march on Bust twice to subdue the rebels. ‘Aziz attempted to conquer Sistan but was defeated by a Saffarid army towards the end of 925. He fled to Khurasan, ending his attempt to take over Sistan.

Having successfully defended against the rebels, Abu Ja’far Ahmad sought to expand his realm at the expense of the Abbasid Caliphate, which had been suffering a series of setbacks over the last several years. He therefore sent several of his officials to Kerman, a province which had formerly belonged to the Saffarids. Taxes were collected by the officials, who then returned to Sistan. Saffarid authority over Kerman was therefore only temporary; the Abbasids held a loose grip on the province for a few more years before the Banu Ilyas took over in 932.

Abu Ja’far Ahmad continued to be preoccupied with unrest in Bust. He had to personally arrive at the town in 931 to deal with a rebellion, and another force was sent in the following year. Events in the neighboring Samanid amirate also contributed to the troubles. In 930 a plot to overthrow the Samanid amir Nasr b. Ahmad and replace him with his brothers failed. A few individuals involved in the plot arrived in Bust in 932 at the head of a contingent of troops and attacked the Saffarid governor there. Abu Ja’far Ahmad was forced to arrive at the head of an army and defeat the fugitives. Because he was frequently needed in Bust and other parts of the eastern provinces, Abu Ja’far Ahmad often left Zarang in the hands of the three sons of one Tahir b. Asnam.

After these initial troubles, Sistan and the outlying provinces calmed down for several years, making for a relatively peaceful period in Abu Ja’far Ahmad's reign. He was held in high regard by his neighbors; even the Samanids, the historical enemies of the Saffarids, were apparently friendly with him (in fact, the poet Rudaki praised the Saffarid's name in a panegyric at the Samanid court in Bukhara, see below). Other poets, both Persian and Arabic, also viewed the amir favorably. Many scholarly gatherings in Sistan were conducted, and were attended by leaders in the field such as Abu Sulayman Muhammad al-Sijistani and Nasafi.

This peace was not to last, however. Different factions outside the capital soon came to violence against each other, forcing the dispatch of the army. From the 950s on there was continuing unrest in Sistan. In the meantime, the three sons of Tahir b. Asnam who sometimes governed in Abu Ja’far Ahmad's name when he was absent from Zarang fell from favor and were imprisoned. In their place, Abu’l-Fath, the commander of the army, took over many functions of the government. He eventually revolted, however, and gained a large degree of support from the people outside of Zarang. Abu’l-Fath was further supported by another Saffarid, Abu’l-‘Abbas b. Tahir, who, as a great-grandson of Amr b. Laith, could claim to be directly related to the original Saffarid amirs (in contrast, Ab Ja’far Ahmad could only claim descent from Amr on his mother's side).

The pretender Abu’l-‘Abbas, together with Abu’l-Fath, advanced against Zarang. Abu Ja’far Ahmad met them in battle, and together with Turkish reinforcements from Bust, defeated the rebels. Abu’l-Fath fled to Nishapur, where he eventually died in the summer of 963.

Abu’l-‘Abbas, on the other hand joined a plot with one of Abu Ja’far Ahmad's Turkish ghulams. Together, they killed Abu Ja’far Ahmad at a drinking party at the end of March 963 and plundered his treasury. The amir's son and heir, Abu Ahmad Khalaf, happened to be outside of the capital the night of the murder and less than two months later managed to establish himself in Zarang.

== Sources ==
- Bosworth, C.E. (1975). "The Ṭāhirids and Ṣaffārids". In Frye, R.N. (ed.). The Cambridge History of Iran, Volume 4: From the Arab Invasion to the Saljuqs. Cambridge: Cambridge University Press. pp. 90–135. ISBN 0-521-20093-8.
- Bosworth, C.E. The History of the Saffarids of Sistan and the Maliks of Nimruz (247/861 to 949/1542-3). Costa Mesa, California: Mazda Publishers, 1994.

Preceded by Abu Hafs 'Amr	Saffarid amir 923–963	Succeeded by Abu Ahmad Khalaf
Preceded by 'Abdallah ibn Ahmad	Amir of Sistan; 923–963	Succeeded by Abu Ahmad Khalaf
