= Tashk Lake =

Lake Tashk
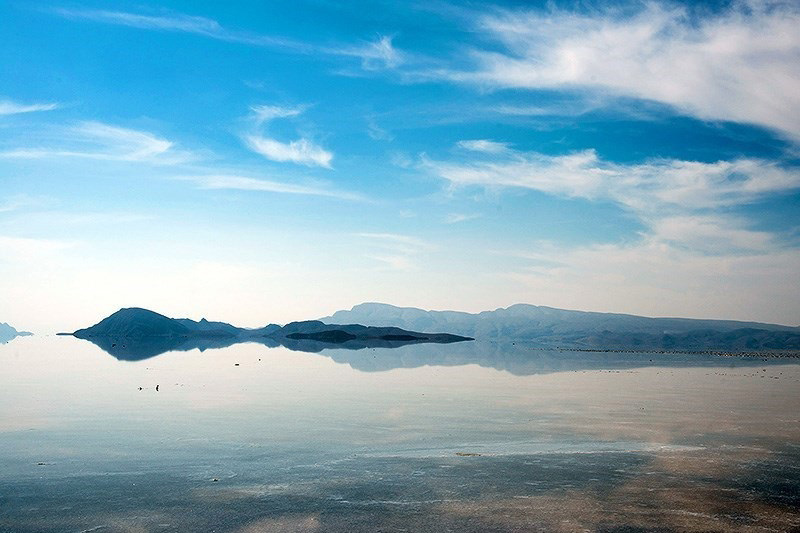

- Location within Iran
- Interactive map of Lake Tashk
- Coordinates: 29.4321°N 53.3230°E
- Type: Salt lake
- Primary inflows: Kor River
- Basin countries: Iran
- Surface area: 800 km^{2} (310 sq mi)
- Islands: Narges Island, Gonban Island

Lake Tashk (Persian: دریاچۀ طشک) is a salt lake in Fars province, southern Iran. The lake lies about 160 km (99 mi) east of Shiraz and 10 km (6.2 mi) west of the town of Abadeh Tashk.

== Registration in the Ramsar Convention List ==
Bakhtegan and Tashk Lakes and Wetlands (BTL) were registered in the Ramsar Convention List in 1975 and became a national park in 1995.

== Environmental conditions ==
=== Biodiversity ===
More than 23 species of fish, 86 species of mammals, 218 species of birds, and 30 species of reptiles have been recorded in this national park. The area is of great importance for breeding and wintering waterfowl of various species, including the marbled duck.These lakes have a high habitat diversity and are considered to be among the best aquatic ecosystems in Iran. Also, due to the reserves needed by aquatic animals, they are a good place for wintering, egg-laying and reproduction of migratory birds.

== Watershed and challenges ==
Only the Kor and Sivand rivers are permanent rivers that flow in some parts of the basin and provide part of the water needs. Factors such as the rate of evaporation, geological location, and the presence of two salt lakes have caused a decrease in water quality, especially in the south of the basin. On the other hand, groundwater is the main source of water supply for various uses such as agriculture, industry and drinking. Excessive water withdrawal from the potential of groundwater aquifers has created critical conditions in a large part of the basin.
