= Tomb of Ya'qub ibn al-Layth al-Saffar =

- آرامگاه یعقوب لیث صفاری
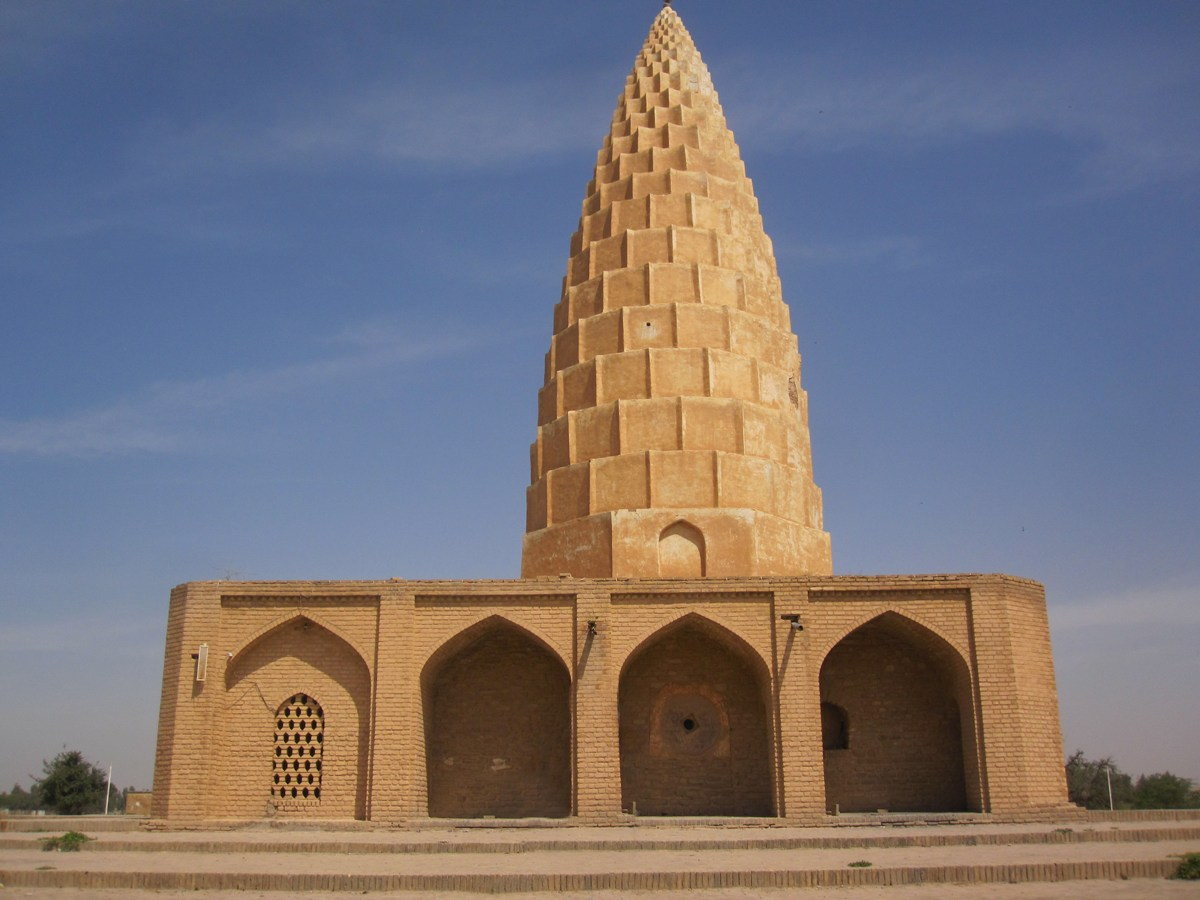
- Interactive map of the Tomb of Ya'qub ibn al-Layth al-Saffar area

General information
- Location: Gundeshapur, Dezful County, Khuzestan Province, Iran
- Coordinates: 32.30258°N 48.51953°E

The Tomb of Ya'qub ibn al-Layth al-Saffar or Yaghub Leys Safari (Persian: آرامگاه یعقوب لیث صفاری) was built by the Saffarid dynasty and this building is located in Gundeshapur in Dezful County, Khuzestan Province, Iran. It is the tomb of Ya'qub ibn al-Layth al-Saffar, the founder of the Saffarid dynasty.
