= Khalaf ibn Ahmad =

Amir of Saffarid dynasty from 963 to 1002

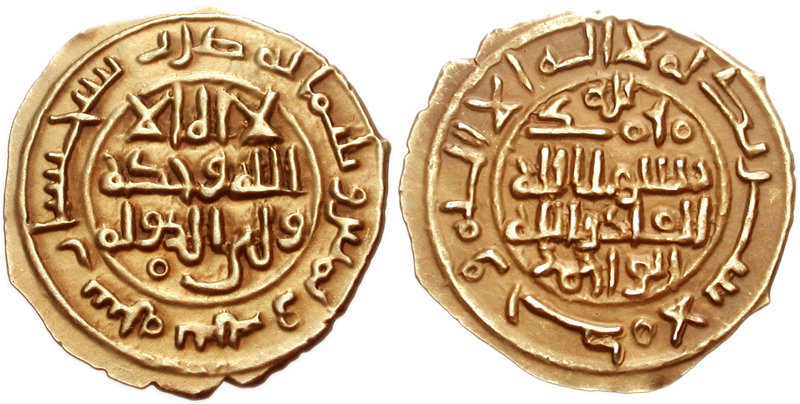
- Coin of Khalaf

Amir of the Saffarid dynasty
- Reign: 963–1002
- Predecessor: Ahmad ibn Muhammad
- Successor: Ghaznavid conquest
- Born: November 937; Sistan
- Died: 1009; Gardez (present-day Paktia Province, Afghanistan)
- House: Saffarid
- Father: Ahmad ibn Muhammad
- Mother: Banu
- Religion: Sunni Islam

Abu Ahmad Wali 'l-Dawla Khalaf ibn Ahmad (November 937 – March 1009) was the Saffarid amir of Sistan from 963 until 1002. Although he was renowned in the eastern Islamic world as a scholar, his reign was characterized by violence and instability, and Saffarid rule over Sistan came to an end with his deposition.

== Early life ==
Khalaf was born in the middle of November 937 to Abu Ja'far Ahmad and Banu, a daughter of the second Saffarid amir, Amr ibn al-Layth in Sistan. Little is known about the first twenty-six years of his life; presumably much of it was spent learning. From 957 or 958 at the latest he was recognized as heir to the throne and his name was included on his father's coins.

== Succession ==
At the end of March 963 Abu Ja'far Ahmad was murdered in Zarang. At the time of the assassination, Khalaf had been outside the capital. When he heard about his father's death, he rode for the town of Bust, whose governor immediately pledged his support. Soon afterward he led an army against Zarang, which was under the control of a rival Saffarid named Abu Hafs b. Muhammad. Seeing Khalaf's army, Abu Hafs fled the capital and sought refuge in Samanid Khurasan, allowing Khalaf to enter Zarang.

Shortly after Khalaf was proclaimed amir, he proclaimed Abu'l-Husayn Tahir ibn Muhammad his co-ruler. Abu'l-Husayn Tahir, who was descended from the Saffarids on his mother's side, had been governing Farah but came to Zarang after Abu Ja'far Ahmad was murdered. Khalaf set him up in the Ya'qubi palace and had his name inserted in the khutba beside his.

A year after Khalaf's ascension, a riot broke out in Zarang. Led by an ayyār leader and involving the city factions, it was quickly put down. Khalaf then decided to perform the Pilgrimage and departed, leaving Abu'l-Husayn Tahir in charge.

Khalaf spent probably one year on the Pilgrimage before returning (965). On the way home he stopped at Baghdad, where the Buyid amir Mu'izz al-Dawla gave him an audience with the Abbasid caliph al-Muti. The caliph confirmed him in his rule of Sistan and gave him a robe of honor and standard. Khalaf felt, however, that Abu'l-Husayn Tahir would not willingly give up control of Sistan upon his return, so he went to the Samanids for assistance and received an army. Returning to Sistan, he forced Abu'l-Husayn Tahir to retreat. As soon as Khalaf's army had been dismissed, however, Abu'l-Husayn Tahir returned, forcing Khalaf to seek Samanid help again. The conflict suddenly ended with the death of Abu'l Husayn Tahir in 970; his son Husayn declared his allegiance to the Samanids and left Sistan for the time being.

== Conflict with Husayn b. Abu'l-Husayn Tahir ==
Within a year of the death of Abu'l-Husayn Tahir, his son Husayn pressed his claim to the amirate. Returning to Sistan, he soon gained control of Zarang in late 970/early 971. When Khalaf and his forces advanced to retake the capital, Husayn left the city and led his army against him. In the ensuing battle, Khalaf was victorious and several of Husayn's military commanders were killed. Khalaf retook Zarang in April 971 and immediately began to root out Husayn's supporters in the city, causing many of them to flee to Khurasan.

Khalaf's victory proved to be only temporary, as Husayn returned in the following year. With an army that included elephants, Husayn defeated Khalaf in battle and reoccupied Zarang. A further setback for Khalaf occurred when the Samanids decided to get involved in the conflict. Khalaf had neglected to send the customary tribute to the Samanid amir at Bukhara, and Husayn took advantage of the amir's interest in the conflict by leaving Zarang and travelling to Bukhara to seek assistance (Khalaf, for his part, seems to have been more friendly to the Buyids, even including the name of the Buyid amir 'Adud al-Dawla in the khutba at one point, perhaps in an attempt to receive military aid. No record of Buyid intervention in Sistan during this time appears, however). A Samanid army was sent to support Husayn; Khalaf gave battle but was defeated in August of 979.

Husayn and his Samanid allies then surrounded Zarang, which Khalaf had fled to after the battle. A siege lasting for probably three years began. Khalaf's forces attempted numerous sorties but were unable to break the siege; the Samanid and Saffarid armies battled each other several times, with neither gaining a decisive victory. The Samanid amir eventually sent a member of the Simjurid family, Abu'l-Hasan Muhammad Simjuri, to break the stalemate. With his help, a truce was achieved between Husayn and Khalaf in 983. Husayn received Zarang and much of Sistan; he entered the capital and had the name of the Samanid amir inserted in the khutba there. Khalaf left Zarang and took up residence in the nearby fortress of Taq and was to receive the revenues of the state lands and part of the revenues from Zarang.

As soon as Abu'l-Hasan left Sistan, however, Khalaf broke the truce and attempted to retake Sistan. Husayn barricaded himself in the citadel, but found that its supplies had been depleted by Khalaf's forces during the three-year siege. Realizing that he couldn't hold out for long, he contacted the Ghaznavids for help. The Ghaznavid Sebuktigin made his way to Sistan, but Khalaf managed to bribe him and eventually convince him to assist him instead. With no choice left but to surrender, Husayn sent envoys to seek peace. An agreement was reached on December 25, 983, and to celebrate the peace numerous festivities were held. Husayn died not long after.

== Later years ==
Khalaf was now the sole uncontested amir of Sistan for the first time in twenty years. During the next several years he gained his reputation for being a great scholar and for encouraging learning within his realm. He is also said to have made another Pilgrimage, though the date of this is uncertain. Upon the deposition of the caliph al-Ta'i in 991 by the Buyid Baha' al-Dawla, he recognized the new caliph al-Qadir. This represented a break between him and the Samanids, who with their vassals the Ghaznavids continued to recognize al-Tai as caliph. In any case, it was probably al-Qadir who gave Khalaf his laqab of Wali 'l-Dawla.

Khalaf also conducted a campaign to retake Bust and Zamindawar. These had been virtually lost to the Saffarids during Abu'l-Husayn Tahir's rule; the local Turks had been more or less independent before the Ghaznavid Sebuktigin conquered the region in c. 978. Khalaf occupied Bust in 986 while Sebuktigin was preoccupied with his own campaign against the Hindushah. When the Ghaznavid returned, however, Khalaf was forced to surrender Bust and return the taxes he had taken from the town.

Khalaf had several sons; the two oldest, Abu Nasr and Abu'l-Fadl, died of natural causes. The third, 'Amr, spent many years at the court of the Samanid amir in Bukhara. In 988 'Amr was sent back to Sistan, where his father warmly welcomed him. A few years later, however, 'Amr took part in a rebellion against Khalaf. The rebellion was soon put down and 'Amr was jailed; he died in prison shortly after.

Following the attempt to take Bust, Khalaf and Sebuktigin seem to have been on good terms. Khalaf is reported to have participated in a campaign together with Sebuktigin and the Farighunid amir of Guzgan to assist the Samanids in quelling a rebellion in Khurasan. When Sebuktigin died in 997, however, his two sons Mahmud and Ismail disputed over who should succeed him. Khalaf viewed this as an opportunity to gain territory from the Ghaznavids, and sent his fourth son Tahir to take Quhistan and Badghis in 998. Tahir was defeated in Baghdis by Mahmud's uncle Bughrachuq, although the latter was killed in the fighting.

Mahmud had no intention of letting this assault go unpunished. He led his troops into Sistan in 1000 and trapped a surprised Khalaf, who was staying at a hill resort. Khalaf, lacking an army, had to pay an indemnity, put Mahmud's name before his own on his coins and place the Ghaznavid's name in the khutba.

Khalaf's son Tahir is mentioned as having invaded Buyid Kerman in 1000, although he was ultimately unsuccessful in making any lasting gains. Soon afterwards he, like Amr before him, rebelled against Khalaf. The rebellion ended with Tahir's capture; he was imprisoned and died not long after, in 1002. With Tahir's death Khalaf was no longer left with any suitable heirs.

Khalaf's reign had grown increasingly unpopular over the years; his unpopularity especially grew after Tahir's rebellion. After Tahir died, the commander of his army sent a message to Mahmud of Ghazna, stating that the people of Zarang wanted him to become the ruler of Sistan. Mahmud responded by sending an advance force to secure Sistan. Khalaf resisted, barricaded himself in Taq and withstood a siege by the Ghaznavid force, so Mahmud decided to come personally in November 1002. Mahmud's army was reinforced by the townspeople of Zarang, eager to see the Saffarid defeated. By December 1002 Khalaf was forced to surrender. He was sent to Farighunid Guzgan, where he lived until 1006 or 1007. Rumors that Khalaf was in contact with the Karakhanids, whom Mahmud was at war with at the time, resulted in him being transferred south to Gardez, where he died in 1009. Sistan remained under Ghaznavid rule until 1029, when the Nasrid dynasty gained control of the country.

== Bibliography ==
- Bosworth, C.E. The History of the Saffarids of Sistan and the Maliks of Nimruz (247/861 to 949/1542-3). Costa Mesa, California: Mazda Publishers, 1994.

Preceded by Abu Ja'far Ahmad	Saffarid amir 963–1002	Ghaznavid conquest
