= Abdallah ibn Ahmad =

Amir of Sistan from 922 to 923

‘Abdallah ibn Ahmad was the amir of Sistan from 922 to 923.

‘Abdallah became amir on the night of October 8, 922, when he led an uprising in Zarang against Ahmad ibn Qudam. Most of the people of Zarang supported ‘Abdallah, forcing Ahmad to flee the town; the latter made his way to al-Rukhkhaj and Bust. ‘Abdallah attempted to pursue him by taking a direct route across the desert, but found that Ahmad had poisoned all the wells along the way. Having to take a longer route instead, he nevertheless caught up to Ahmad in January 923, defeating him in battle and capturing him.

Not long after defeating Ahmad, ‘Abdallah's reign came into jeopardy as he began to lose the popular support he had enjoyed earlier. His harsh taxation demands on Bust and Zarang, and his decision to abandon Zarang and move to Bust, eventually caused the people of Zarang to rebel in May 923. Their choice of leader was a Saffarid, Abu Ja'far Ahmad, even though no Saffarid had ruled over Sistan in over a decade.

‘Abdallah's son ‘Aziz attempted to regain control of Zarang, but despite the lawlessness that prevailed for a time amongst the ‘ayyars, their loyalty to the Saffarid line enabled them to defend the town against him. After that things quickly fell apart for ‘Abdallah. His representative in al-Rukhkhaj shifted his loyalty to Abu Ja’far, and the people of Bust likewise declared their support for the Saffarid. ‘Abdallah maintained his position on the edges of Sistan, but was defeated in battle by Abu Ja’far's supporters. He fled in the direction Samanid Khurasan, but was captured and brought back to Zarang on the night of October 26, 923. This is the last mention of him; it is likely that he was either imprisoned or killed. His son ‘Aziz maintained continued to oppose Abu Ja’far until the end of 925, but was eventually defeated as well.

Preceded by Ahmad ibn Qudam	Amir of Sistan; 922–923	Succeeded by Abu Ja'far Ahmad
