= Ahmad ibn Qudam =

Ahmad ibn Qudam was the amir of Sistan from c. 919 until 923.

Ahmad rose to power in Sistan after the assassination of Kathir ibn Ahmad in 919. In order to maintain friendly relations with the neighboring Abbasid Caliphate, the new ruler offered to pay tribute that his predecessor had promised to Baghdad. Trouble at home, however, erupted when Muhammad ibn Qasim, the governor of Zabulistan and son-in-law of the murdered Kathir ibn Ahmad, rejected Ahmad's rule and gathered supporters to his side. He marched at the head of an army from Bust and nearly overthrew Ahmad, but was defeated. Muhammad fled to Zabulistan, then returned to Sistan, only to be killed by Ahmad's supporters.

Although Muhammad ibn Qasim had been defeated, Ahmad still had to deal with challenges to his authority. In Bust and Zamindawar a Turkish commander named Toghan opposed Ahmad's authority, prompting the latter to send two expeditions against him. The first failed, but the second defeated and killed Toghan in January 922. Less than nine months later, a plot against Ahmad was carried out in the capital, Zarang. Led by ‘Abdallah ibn Ahmad, the citizens of Zarang enthusiastically supported it. Ahmad's wealth and arms were seized by the usurper, and most of Ahmad's supporters deserted him.

Seeing that his cause in Zarang was lost, Ahmad fled the town. Only his Indian personal guards followed him. Ahmad made his way to Bust and al-Rukhkhaj, although he suffered a further setback when the commander of his personal guard left him and joined ‘Abdallah b. Ahmad. The latter then planned to take the direct desert route from Zarang to Bust in pursuit of Ahmad, but found that all the wells along the route had been poisoned. Nevertheless, Ahmad was unable to stay ahead of ‘Abdallah, who defeated and captured him in battle near Bust on January 17, 923, ending for good Ahmad's term as amir.

Preceded by Kathir ibn Ahmad	Amir of Sistan; 919–923	Succeeded by 'Abdallah ibn Ahmad
