= Battle of Balkh =

| Date | 900 |
| Location | Balkh, (present day Afghanistan) |
| Result | Samanid victory |
| Territorial changes | Balkh alongside the remaining cities of Khurasan gets annexed by the Samanids |

Belligerents
| Samanid Empire | Saffarid dynasty |

Commanders and leaders
| Isma'il ibn Ahmad | Amr ibn al-Layth (POW) |

Strength
| 20,000 horsemen | 70,000 cavalry |

Casualties and losses
| Some of the corps were wounded | Very Heavy |

The Battle of Balkh took place between the armies of the Samanid Empire under the command of Emir Isma'il ibn Ahmad and Saffarid forces under Emir Amr ibn al-Layth in 900. The Saffarid army was defeated by the Samanid forces, and Amr ibn al-Layth was captured.

The Samanid ruler, Isma'il ibn Ahmad, was sent him in chains to Baghdad, where he was executed in 902, after al-Mu'tadid's death

After the Battle, the Saffarids lost Khorasan and were left with the control of Fars, Kerman and Sistan, which they also lost after a civil war by 912
