= Kathir ibn Ahmad =

Kathir ibn Ahmad ibn Shahfur (also known as Kuthayyir) (died 919) was the amir of Sistan from 917 until his death.

== Life ==
Kathir was the son of an officer who had served in Amr ibn Laith's army. Before becoming amir, he acted as a mediator during the Samanid invasion of Sistan in 911. After the Samanids conquered Sistan, Kathir ended up in the service of the caliphal representative Abu Yazid Khalid, who wrested Sistan from the Samanids but then threw off Abbasid sovereignty. Kathir participated in Abu Yazid Khalid's invasion of Kerman and Fars in 917, in which the latter was defeated and killed.

Following the defeat, Kathir returned to Sistan with a portion of Abu Yazid Khalid's army, and was recognized as amir in Zarang on May 19, 917. The dependencies of Sistan (Bust, al-Rukhkhaj and Zamindawar) followed suit soon after. With the support of the local 'ayyars, he defeated an army sent by Badr ibn 'Abdallah, the governor of Fars and Kerman, to retake the province.

Despite this, Kathir was not confident that he could survive a full-scale offensive by Badr and sought a rapprochement with the Abbasids. He released prisoners captured in the battle with Badr's army and offered tribute to Baghdad; the caliphal government accepted this gesture. Just as peace had been established, however, Kathir was assassinated as the result of a conspiracy involving an 'ayyar leader, the commander of his Indian troops, and an officer named Ahmad ibn Qudam. The alleged reason behind the murder was Kathir's ill-treatment of a faqih. Ahmad ibn Qudam became amir following Kathir's death.

Preceded by Abu Yazid Khalid	Amir of Sistan; 917–919	Succeeded by Ahmad ibn Qudam
