= Doroodzan Dam =

Dam in Fars, Iran

Coordinates: 30°12′29″N 52°25′02″E

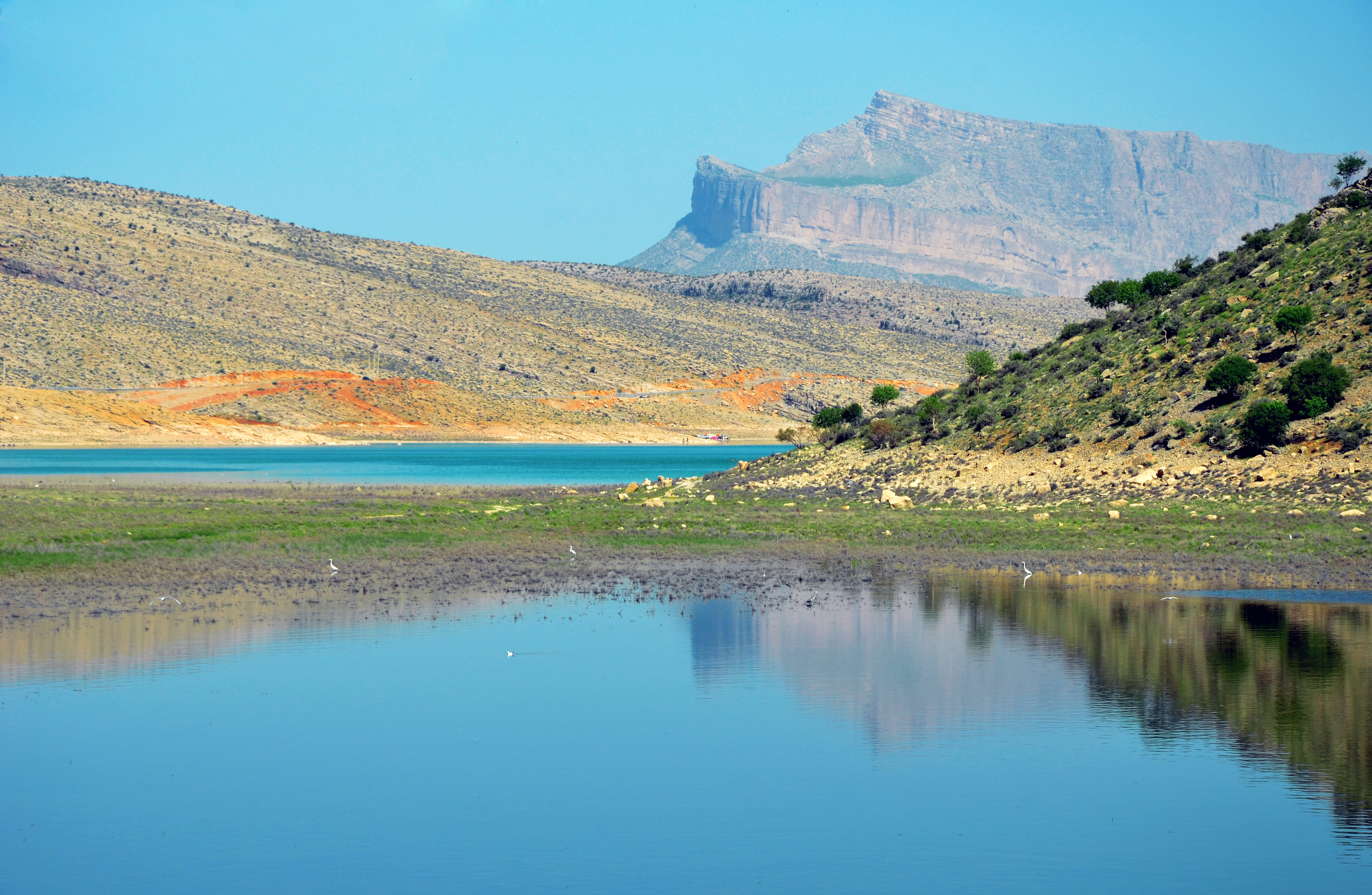
- Interactive map of Doroodzan Dam
- Country: Iran
- Purpose: Flood control, irrigation, water supply, power

Dam and spillways
- Impounds: Kor River
- Height (foundation): 58 m (190 ft)
- Length: 710 m (2,329 ft)
- Width (crest): 9 m (30 ft)

Doroodzan Dam (Persian: سد درودزن) is an earthen dam in Fars province, Iran, about 85 kilometres (53 mi) north of Shiraz. Completed in 1974 and built primarily for irrigation water storage, flood control, and municipal water storage, the facility is also a hydroelectric dam with an installed electricity generating capability of 10 MW.

== Project construction goals ==
- Irrigation water supply for 110/000 ha
- Supplying parts of urban water needs for the cities of Marvdasht, Zaghan and Shiraz
- Supplying industrial water needs of the nearby factories
- Flood control of Kor river
- Energy generation

== Water condition ==
- Area of the watershed: 4372 km^{2}
- Average annual flow of the river from the reservoir: 1192 MCM
- Average annual evaporation of water from the reservoir: 64 MCM
- Average annual rainfall of the area: 485 mm

== See also ==
- Dams in Iran
- List of power stations in Iran
