= Kor River =

Kor river
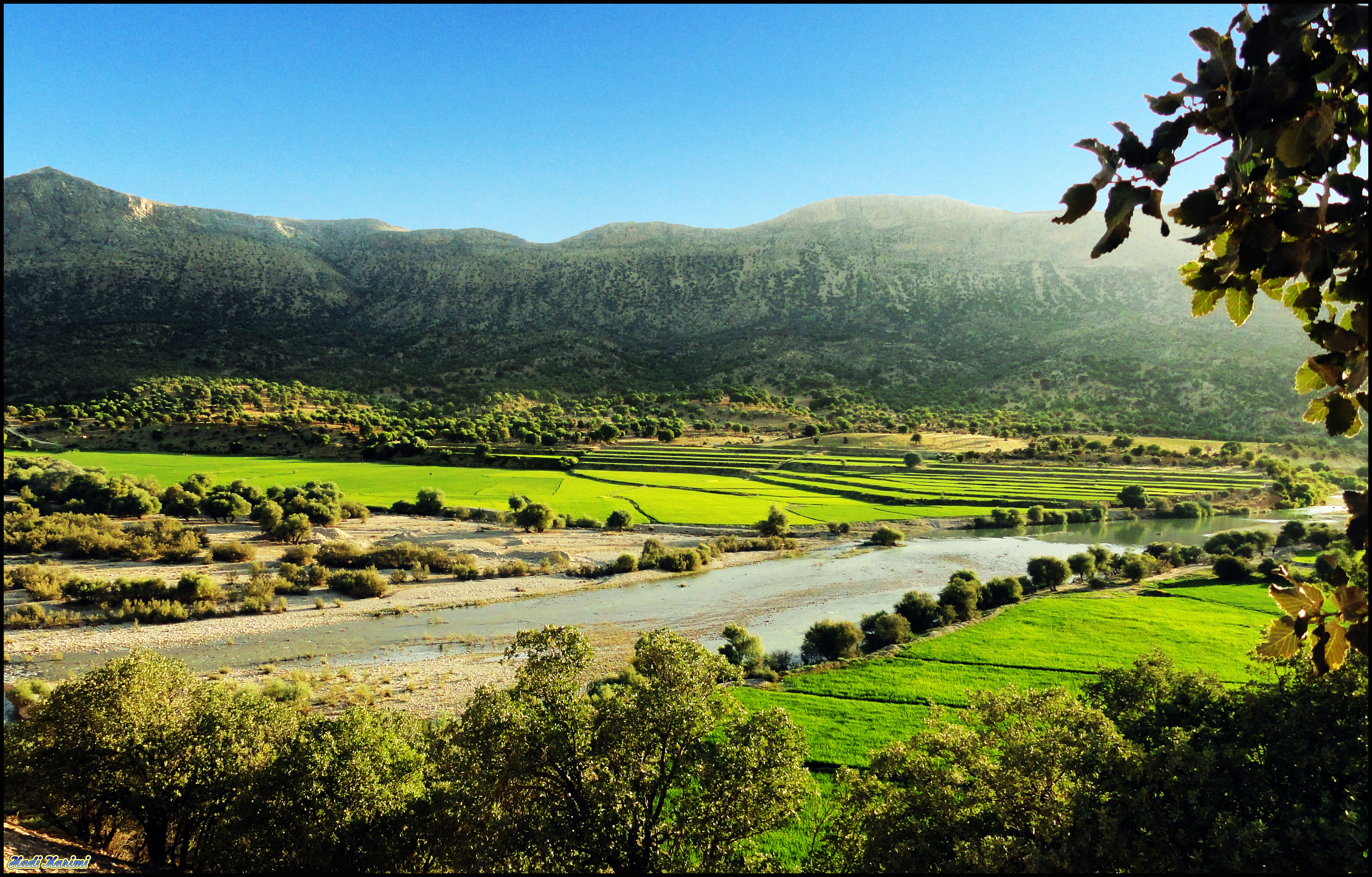

Location
- Country: Iran

Physical characteristics
- Source
  - location: Zagros Mountains
- Mouth
  - location: Bakhtegan Lake
- Length: 280 km (170 mi)
- Basin size: 9,650 km^{2} (3,730 sq mi)

Basin features
- Progression: Fars province

Kor River (also Kur River; Persian: رود کر) is located in the Fars province of Iran. The sources of the river are mostly in the Zagros Mountains near Mount Dena. It flows into the Bakhtegan Lake, which is a salt lake. The increased salinity level of the lake is due to the decreased flow of the river, which has been dammed.

== Description ==
The irrigation of the river basin is facilitated by the various hydraulic facilities that were built. For example, the Droudzan/Doroodzan Dam was built in 1972, near Marvdasht.

The river is never completely dry because it is fed by the snowmelt of Zagros, except for the delta in the summer.

Several canals were built along the river. Many problems of river pollution also cause disturbances in the fauna and flora of the river.

There are dams at Band-e-Amir, Feiz Abbd, Tilakan, Mawan, Hassan Abad, and Abbd Jahan.

Other ancient names of this river are Araxes of Persia, also known as Aras.

The main tributary of Kor is the Pulvar/Polvar (or Sivand) River. It was formerly also called Medus.

== Archaeology ==
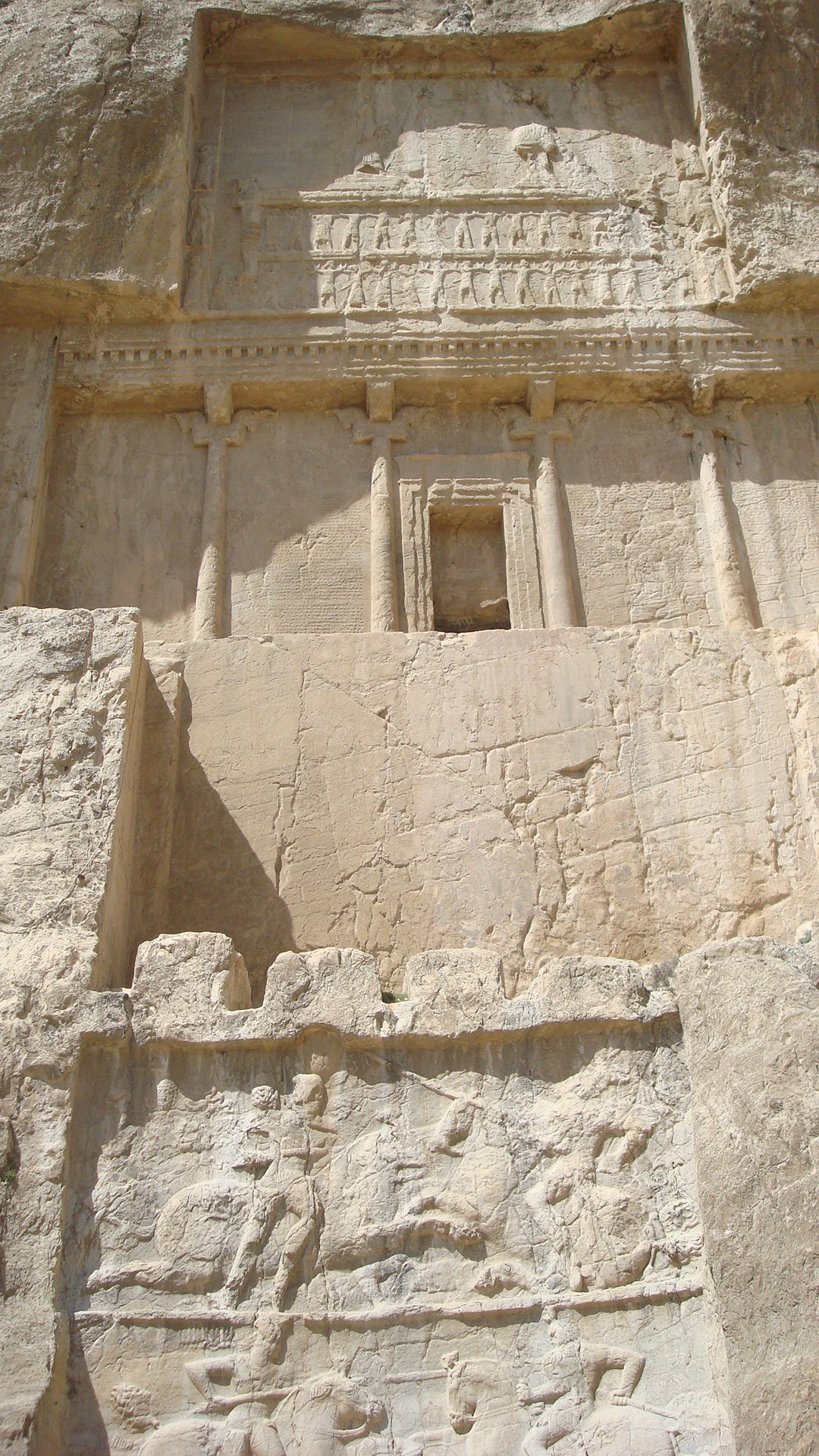
Tomb of Darius I at Naqsh-e Rustam along the Pulvar River, Iran

The ancient necropolis of Naqsh-e Rustam is located on the Pulvar River.

The Sivand dam was built on the Polvar river in the Bolaghi Gorge, or Tangeh Bolāghi, near Sivand in 2007, flooding many ancient sites.

Bolaghi Gorge is an archaeologically significant valley consisting of 130 ancient settlements going back as early as 5000 BCE.

The first dam on the river was made south of Persepolis during the reign of Darius the Great between 521 and 485 BC.

== Bibliography ==
- Ecological study of rotifers from Kor river, Fars, Iran
- Keshavarzi Ali Reza et Nabavi, S. H., Dominant discharge in the Kor river, Fars province, Iran
