= Ya'qub ibn al-Layth al-Saffar =

Amir of the Saffarid dynasty from 861 to 879

Ya'qub ibn al-Layth یعقوب لیث صفاری
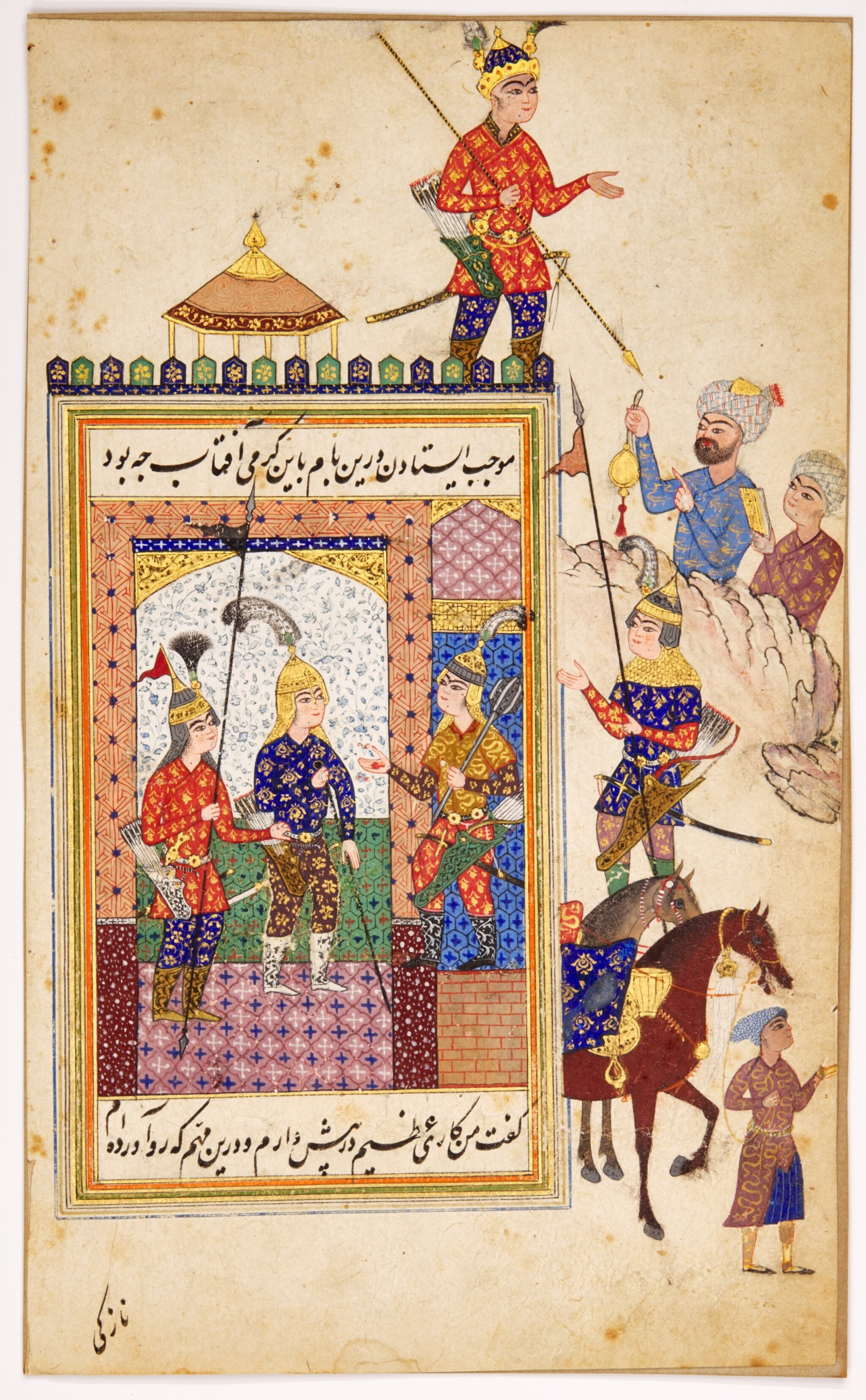
- Ya'qub ibn al-Layth standing on the roof in full armour, folio from a manuscript of Husayn Kashifi's Akhlaq-i Muhsini. Created in Shiraz, Safavid Iran, 16th century

Amir of the Saffarid dynasty
- Reign: 861–879
- Successor: Amr ibn al-Layth
- Born: 25 October 840; Karnin (near Zaranj), Tahirid Khorasan, Abbasid Caliphate (Modern-day Afghanistan)
- Died: 5 June 879 (aged 38); Gundeshapur, Saffarid State (Modern-day Iran)
- Burial: Tomb of Yaghub Leys Safari, Gundeshapur, Dezful, Khuzestan, Iran
- House: Saffarid
- Father: Laith
- Military career
- Conflicts: Saffarid-Abbasid Wars; Battle of al-Baida; Battle of Dayr al-Aqul; Hindu Shahi-Saffarid Wars

Ya'qub ibn al-Layth Saffar (Persian: یعقوب لیث صفاری, romanized: Ya'qub-e Leys-e Saffari; 25 October 840 – 5 June 879) was a coppersmith and the founder of the Saffarid dynasty of Sistan, with its capital at Zarang (a city now in south-western Afghanistan). Under his military leadership, he conquered much of the eastern portions of Greater Iran consisting of modern-day Iran, Afghanistan, Turkmenistan, Uzbekistan, Tajikistan as well as portions of western Pakistan and a small part of Iraq. He was succeeded by his brother, Amr ibn al-Layth.

== Early life ==
Ya'qub was born in 840, of eastern Iranian origin, in a small town called Karnin (Qarnin), which was located east of Zaranj and west of Bost (Lashkargah), in what is now Afghanistan. Information about his genealogy and social background is lacking. Clifford Edmund Bosworth explains that several Sunni sources were invariably hostile to Ya'qub because of the disrespect he showed toward the Abbasid caliph. "Some sources accused Ya'qub of being a Khariji, Ibn Khallikan labeled him a Christian, and Nizam al-Mulk claimed that he converted to Ismailism". However, these claims came roughly a century after Yaqub's death, and most sources agree on Ya'qub's ascetic lifestyle. Historian, D G Tor, presents numerous evidences supporting that Ya'qub was a devout Sunni warrior. All of the religious figures associated with Ya'qub were orthodox Sunni Muslims.

According to numerous sources, he was extremely poor, and because of this, he occasionally consumed bread and onions. His family moved to the city of Zaranj due to the occasional sectarian violence between the Sunnis and Kharijites. Ya'qub began work as a coppersmith ("saffar"), while his brother Amr ibn al-Layth worked as a mule-hirer.

== Rise to power ==
Ya'qub, along with his brothers Amr ibn al-Layth, Tahir ibn al-Layth and Ali ibn al-Layth, later joined the ayyars under Salih ibn al-Nadr, who had opposed the Abbasids and began ruling in Bost. By 854, the ayyars managed to expel Ibrahim ibn al-Hudain, who was the Tahirid governor of Sistan. Another ayyar leader, Dirham ibn Nasr, succeeded in unseating Salih as the king of Sistan in 858. However, in 861, Ya'qub overthrew Dirham, and gave himself the title of Emir at that point.

== Reign ==
=== Campaigns in Sistan and Khorasan ===
Map of Khurasan, Transoxiana and Tokharistan

Ya'qub attracted the attention of an Abbasid caliph by first battling Kharijites in his homeland of Sistan. In 864, "Yaʿqub led an expedition to Bost against his former master Salih, and then into ar-Rukkaj and Zamindāvar against the local ruler there, the Zunbil, killing him and securing an immense booty." He also managed to capture several family members of the Zunbils, including the Zunbil king's son. He then vanquished the Hindu Shahis, conquering their capital Kabul. He later moved against the Kharijites in northern Sistan, winning a decisive victory and killing their leader Ammar ibn Yaser in 865. Ya'qub's campaigns marked the decline of militant Kharijism in the East. After having defeated the Ammar, Ya'qub held a celebration. During the celebration, one of the members of the court made a speech in Arabic. Ya'qub asked the latter why he made a speech in a language which he could not understand. One of Ya'qub's secretaries, Muhammad ibn Vasif, then made a qasida in Persian.

Ya'qub claimed the inheritance of the kings of Persia and sought "to revive their glory," and thus in 867 he sent a poem written by himself to the Abbasid caliph Al-Mu'tazz. The poem said: "With me is the Derafsh Kaviani, through which I hope to rule the nations."

In 870/871, Ya'qub marched against the Kharijites of Herat, and defeated them. He then marched towards Karukh, and defeated another Khariji leader who was named Abd al-Rahman. Ya'qub then pardoned Abd al-Rahman and made him governor of Isfizar. (Note: C.E. Bosworth and D.G. Tor, citing al-Tabari, state that Ya'qub executed Abd al-Rahman, but Bosworth also cites the Tarikh-i Sistan which states Ya'qub installs Rahman as governor.)

His army would later march to Ghazna, Kabul, and Bamyan, conquering these territories from the Hindu Shahi, and appointing Muslim governors. From there they moved to north of the Hindu Kush and by 870 AD the whole of Khorasan was brought under their control. According to Muhammad Aufi's Jawami ul-Hikayat, during his invasion of Zabul, Yaqub employed a ruse to surrender after being allowed to pay homage to the ruler along with his troops, lest they disperse and become dangerous to both sides. Yaqub's troops "carried their lances concealed behind their horses and were wearing coats of mail under their garments. The Almighty made the army of Rusal (probably Rutbil), blind, so that they did not see the lances. When Yaqub drew near Rusal, he bowed his head as if to do homage, but raised a lance and thrust it in the back of Rusal so that he died on the spot. His people also fell like lightning upon the enemy, cutting them down with their swords and staining the earth with the blood of the enemies of the religion. The infidels when they saw the head of Rusal upon the point of a spear took to flight and great bloodshed ensued. This victory, which he achieved, was the result of treachery and deception, such as no one had ever committed."

Ashirbadi Lal Srivastava states that after this victory by Yaqub over Zabul, the position of Lallya alias Kallar, the Brahmin minister who had overthrown the last Kshatriya king of Kabul Lagaturman, seems to have become untenable. He shifted his capital to Udhaband in 870 AD. Lallya, credited as an able and strong ruler by Kalhana in Rajatarangini, was driven out by Ya'qub from Kabul within a year of his usurpation according to Srivastava.

The Panjshir Valley was now under Ya'qub's control, which made him able to mint silver coins. In 873, Ya'qub ousted the Tahirids from their own capital of Nishapur, and captured its ruler Muhammad ibn Tahir, which led to conflicts with the Abbasid caliphate. During one of Ya'qub's numerous battles, his face was disfigured to the point that he could only eat through a pipe in his mouth for twenty days.

Ya'qub had captured several relatives of the Zunbil's family after defeating Salih b. al-Nasr. Zunbil's son escaped from captivity in 869 and quickly raised an army in al-Rukhkhaj, later seeking refuge with the Kabul-Shah. Per Gardizi, Ya'qub undertook another expedition in 870 which advanced as far as Kabul and Bamiyan. According to Tarikh-e-Sistan, Bamiyan was captured in 871 and its idol-temple was plundered. Ya'qub defeated Kabul in 870 and again had to march there in 872 when the Zunbil's son took possession of Zabulistan. Ya'qub captured him from the fortress of Nay-Laman where he had fled. In 871, Ya'qub sent 50 gold and silver idols he gained by campaigning from Kabul to Caliph Al-Mu'tamid, who sent them to Mecca.

=== Campaigns in Western Iran ===
Ya'qub set out west for Fars with the intention of subjugating the province. Sources disagree on what happened next, but Ya'qub was eventually dissuaded from continuing his expedition, and he turned back toward Sistan. His withdrawal is described as having been caused either by the governor Muhammad ibn Wasil's submission to him, or by the arrival of emissaries sent by the caliphal government to convince him to abandon his westward advance. In either case, Muhammad soon afterwards reached a rapprochement with the central government, and in 872 he handed over the kharaj (tax revenues), and possibly the government of Fars, to a caliphal representative. Ya'qub later traveled to Tabaristan in 874, and battled the Zaydid leader al-Hasan ibn Zayd. Ya'qub collected taxes in Tabaristan's capital Amul before departing for Rayy.

Ya'qub ibn al-Layth once again set out for Fars, this time, invading it and advancing to Estakhr, seizing Muhammad's treasuries there. Muhammad departed from Khuzestan, and returned to Fars in an attempt to stop Ya'qub. They met near Lake Bakhtegan in August 875, and in the resulting battle, Muhammad, despite having a numerically superior army, was defeated. Muhammad was forced to flee; Ya'qub looted Muhammad's stronghold at Sa'idabad and took control of Fars.

Map showing the location of the battle, as well as the routes taken by the Saffarid (red) and main 'Abbasid (blue) armies

In 876, the Abbasid representative Al-Muwaffaq offered Ya'qub governorship of Khurasan, Tabaristan, Fars, Gurgan, and Ray, and to appoint him as head of security in Baghdad. (Note: Ibn Khallikān adds Kirman, Adharbayjan, Qazwin and al-Sind to this list.) Ya'qub, sensing that the offer was made due to the weakness of the caliph, rejected it and wrote back that he would be advancing to the capital. The offer also alienated the Turks of Samarra, who felt that Ya'qub represented a threat to their interests. Seeing that an agreement with the Saffarid was impossible, the Abbasid caliph al-Mu'tamid decided upon war and pronounced a formal curse upon Ya'qub. On 7 March 876, al-Mu'tamid left Samarra, leaving his son Al-Mufawwad in charge of the capital. On 15 March he arrived at Baghdad, before arriving near Kalwadha and setting up camp.

Ya'qub traveled through Khuzistan, during which he gained the defection of a former general of the caliph's, Abi'l-Saj Devdad, and entered Iraq. The caliphal general Masrur al-Balkhi managed to slow down his progress by flooding the land outside Wasit, but the Saffarid army was able to get through this and he entered Wasit on 24 March. Leaving Wasit, he set out for the town of Dayr al-'Aqul, which was about fifty miles from Baghdad. According to one source, Ya'qub did not actually expect the caliph to offer battle; instead he would give in to any demands that the Saffarid had. Al-Mu'tamid, however, sent al-Muwaffaq to stop him. The two armies met at Istarband, between Dayr al-'Aqul and Sib Bani Kuma.

The Battle of Dayr al-Aqul took place on 8 April 876. (Note: The actual date is given variously in the Arabic sources, such as 1 April and 10 April) Before the battle, Ya'qub reviewed his troops, who apparently numbered about ten thousand. The Abbasids, however, had a numerical superiority and the additional advantage of fighting on familiar territory. The center of the Abbasid army was commanded by al-Muwaffaq. Musa bin Bugha had command of the right wing, and Masrur al-Balkhi the left. A final appeal was made to the Saffarids to restore their loyalty to the caliph, and the battle began.

The fighting raged on for most of the day. The Saffarid army was somewhat reluctant to directly fight the caliph and his army. Despite this, there were heavy losses on both sides, and several Abbasid and Saffarid commanders were killed. Ya'qub himself was wounded, but he did not leave the field. As evening approached, reinforcements arrived to support al-Muwaffaq. The mawla Nusayr created a diversion by attacking the Saffarid rear from boats on the Tigris and setting fire to the Saffarid baggage train, giving the Abbasids a further advantage.

Eventually the Saffarid army began to flee from the battle. Ya'qub and his bodyguards continued to fight, but were forced to leave the field as the army retreated, leaving them behind. The caliph had apparently flooded the lands behind the Saffarids before the battle, and this made a retreat difficult; many men drowned attempting to escape the Abbasid army. With the Saffarids making their hasty exit, al-Muwaffaq was able to capture Ya'qub's baggage. Several political prisoners that Ya'qub had brought with him, such as the Tahirid Muhammad bin Tahir, also fell into Abbasid hands and were freed.

Ya'qub then withdrew from Iraq and died three years later.

== Ideology ==
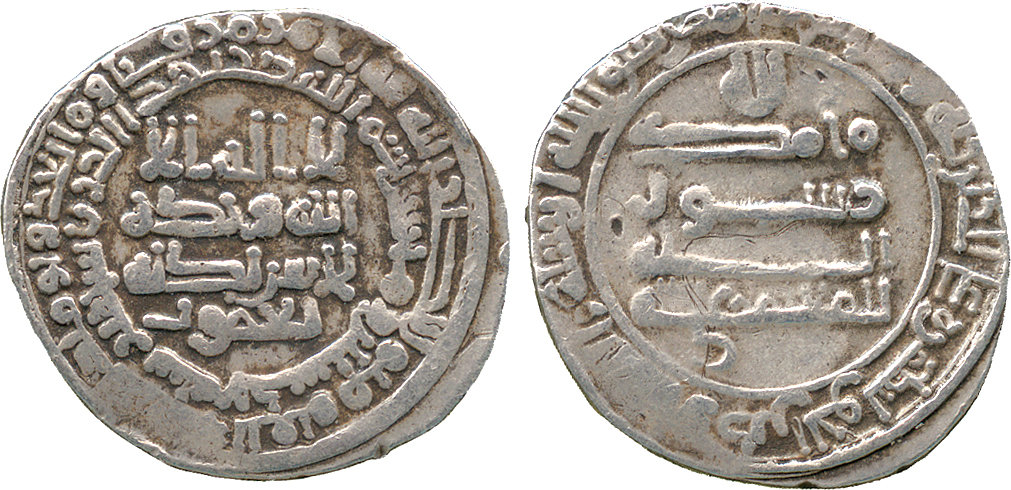
Silver Dirham of Ya'qub ibn al-Layth

The motivation behind the Saffarids' initial campaigns remains unknown and highly debated in secondary scholarship. Some scholars believe that Ya'qub fought as a ghazi warrior for the purpose of spreading proto-Sunni Islam, others support the notion that he was motivated by his Persian identity, (Note: D.G. Tor states S.M Stern's thesis work, which concerned Ya'qub's Persian nationalism, was based on one poem.) while others believed he had a love for military conquest. Ya'qub's hostility towards the Abbasid caliphs was easily seen.

The religion of the Saffarid's founder, Ya'qub, has been a topic of debate. Most of the primary sources were written during or after the fall of the Samanid dynasty and view the Saffarids through Samanid eyes. (Note: According to D.G. Tor, the Samanids vilified the Saffarids in order to increase their own legitimacy since they were competing against them for territory.) These primary sources depict Ya'qub either as a religious rascal or a volunteer Sunni warrior – a mutatawwi. Yet Kharijism prospered in Sistan longer than anywhere else in eastern Iran, and it was believed the Saffarids held Kharijite sympathies. Ya'qub even won Kharijite support in Sistan.

The religious figures associated with Ya'qub were all Sunni Muslims, such as the reputable hadith scholar, Al-Fasawi. Staunchly orthodox Sunni Muslims scholars supported Ya'qub in his campaigns against the Tahirids and even the Abbasid Caliph. Historian, D G Tor, presents numerous evidences supporting that Ya'qub was a devout Sunni warrior.

C.E. Bosworth states the early Saffarid emirs did not appear to have significant religious beliefs. The vizier Nizam al-Mulk, obsessed with the integrity of the Seljuk Empire, depicts Ya'qub as an Ismaili convert.

According to the Tarikh-i Sistan, Ya'qub even said that the Abbasids were liars, and also said: "Haven't you seen what they did to Abu Salama, Abu Muslim, the Barmakid family and Fadl ibn Sahl, despite everything which these men had done on the dynasty's behalf? Let no one ever trust them!"

== Death ==
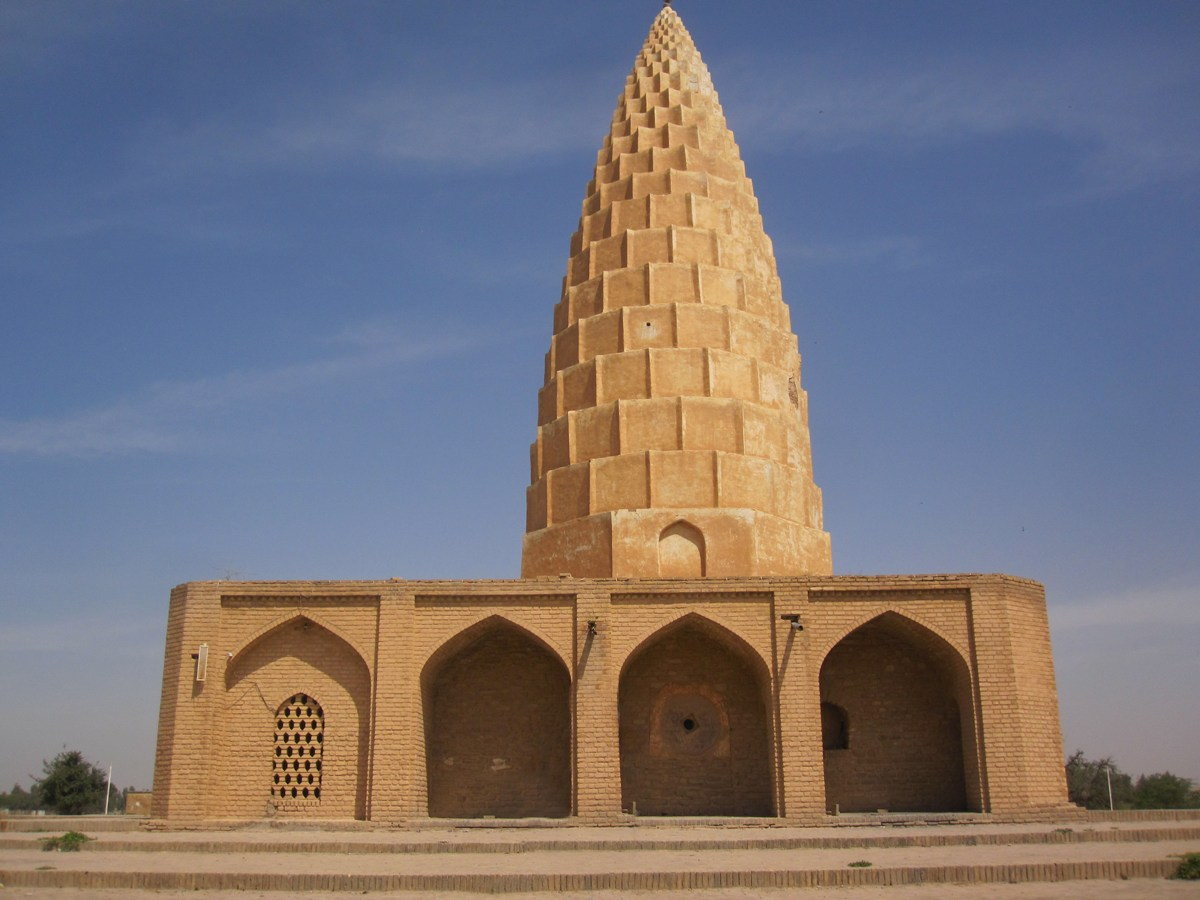
Tomb of Ya'qūb-i Layth-i Saffār, near Dezful

Ya'qub suffered from colic and refused treatments when advised to do so. As a result, he died on Wednesday, 5 June 879, in Gundeshapur. He was succeeded by his brother Amr Saffari. Although he was not viewed as a gentleman, he also did not exercise any special cruelty. It was reported that he did not smile much, and was called "the anvil" by one of his enemies. According to Ibn Khallikan, his wife was an Arab woman from Sistan, although all other sources, including Ibn Athir and Juzjani, claim that Yaqub never married.

== Legacy ==
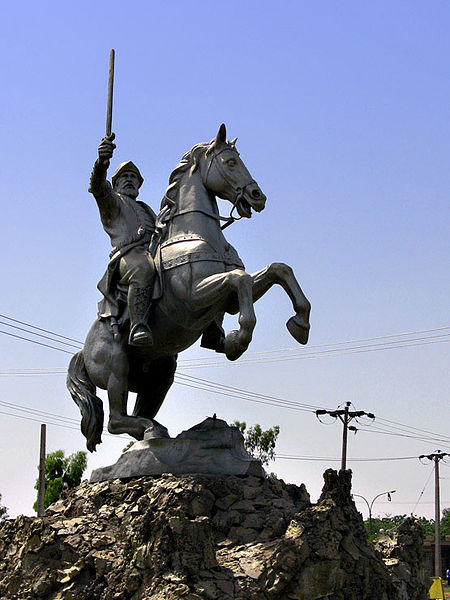
The Statue of Ya'qub ibn al-Layth al-Saffar, in Zabol, Iran

It was during Ya'qub's rule that Persian was introduced as an official language, and Ya'qub reportedly did not know Arabic. Ya'qub has been accorded the historical status of a popular folk hero since his court began the revitalization of the Persian language after two centuries in which the Arabic language flourished in Persian lands. Several poets, like Abu Ishaq Ibrahim ibn Mamshadh, fabricated Ya'qub's genealogy, tracing it back to the legendary Iranian king Jamshid. Ya'qub is also sometimes perceived as one of the first autonomous rulers in Khurasan since the Islamic conquests. Ya'qub's campaigns in fact also marked the early stage in the decline of caliphal political unity in the Islamic world, which was further worsened by the ghulams (slave-soldiers in armies throughout the Islamic world) and the Dailamites.

== Sources ==
- al-Mas'udi, Ali ibn al-Husain (1874). Les Prairies D'Or (in French). Vol. 8. Translated by C. Barbier de Meynard. Paris: Imprimerie Nationale.
- Baumer, Christoph (2016). The History of Central Asia: The Age of Islam and the Mongols. Vol. Three. I.B. Tauris. p. 24. ISBN 978-1-78453-490-5.
- Bosworth, C.E. (1975). "The Ṭāhirids and Șaffārids". In Frye, R.N. (ed.). The Cambridge History of Iran. Vol. 4:The Period from the Arab invasion to the Saljuqs. Cambridge University Press. pp. 90–135.
- al-Tabari. The History of Prophets and Kings.
- The History of al-Tabari, Vol. 36: The Revolt of the Zanj A.D. 869-879/A.H. 255-265. SUNY series in Near Eastern Studies. Translated by David Waines. SUNY Press. 2015. ISBN 978-1438423043.
- The History of al-Tabari, Vol. 37: The 'Abbasid Recovery: The War Against the Zanj Ends A.D. 879-893/A.H. 266-279. SUNY series in Near Eastern Studies. Translated by Philip M. Fields. SUNY Press. 2015. ISBN 978-1438402734.
- Barthold, W. (1986). "ʿAmr b. al-Layth". The Encyclopedia of Islam, New Edition, Volume I: A–B. Leiden and New York: BRILL. pp. 452–453. ISBN 90-04-08114-3.
- Bosworth, C.E. (1975a). "The Ṭāhirids and Ṣaffārids". In Frye, R.N. (ed.). The Cambridge History of Iran, Volume 4: From the Arab Invasion to the Saljuqs. Cambridge: Cambridge University Press. pp. 90–135. ISBN 0-521-20093-8.
- Bosworth, C.E. (1975b). "The rise of the new Persian language". In Frye, R.N. (ed.). The Cambridge History of Iran, Volume 4: From the Arab Invasion to the Saljuqs. Cambridge: Cambridge University Press. pp. 595–633. ISBN 0-521-20093-8.
- Bosworth, C.E. (1994). "The History of the Saffarids of Sistan and the Maliks of Nimruz" (247/861 to 949/1542-3). Costa Mesa, CA: Mazda Publisher.
- Flood, Finbarr B. (20 March 2018). Objects of Translation: Material Culture and Medieval "Hindu-Muslim" Encounter. Princeton University Press. ISBN 978-0-691-18074-8.
- Ibn al-Athir, 'Izz al-Din. Al-Kamil fi al-Tarikh.
- Ibn Khallikān, Shams al-Din Abu al-Abbas Ahmad ibn Muhammad. Ibn Khallikan's Biographical Dictionary. Volume I, Volume III
- Meisami, Julie Scott (1999). Persian Historiography to the End of the Twelfth Century. Edinburgh University Press. ISBN 978-0748612765.
- Noldeke, Theodor (2007). Sketches from Eastern History. Read Books. ISBN 978-1-4067-7014-8.
- Rahmati, Mohsen (2020). "The Saffarid Ya'qub b. Layth and the Revival of Persian Kingship". Journal of Persianate Studies. 13. Brill: 36–58.
- Tor, D.G. (2002). "A Numismatic History of the First Saffarid Dynasty (AH 247-300/AD 861-911)". The Numismatic Chronicle. 162: 293–314.
- Tor, D.G. (2007). Violent Order: Religious Warfare, Chivalry, and the ʻAyyār Phenomenon in the Medieval Islamic World. Wurzburg, Germany: Orient-Institut-Istanbul.

New title	Emir of the Saffarids; 867–879	Succeeded by Amr ibn al-Layth
