= Tarikh-i Sistan =

Modern frontcover of the Tarikh-i Sistan, published by Mohammad-Taqi Bahar in 1935 in Tehran, Iran

The Tarikh-i Sistan (History of Sistan) is an anonymous Persian-language history of the region of Sistan, in modern south-eastern Iran, from legendary and pre-Islamic times through the early Islamic period until 1062.

== Sources ==
- Bosworth, C. E. (2011). "TĀRIḴ-E SISTĀN". Encyclopaedia Iranica, Online Edition.
