= Bakhtegan Lake =

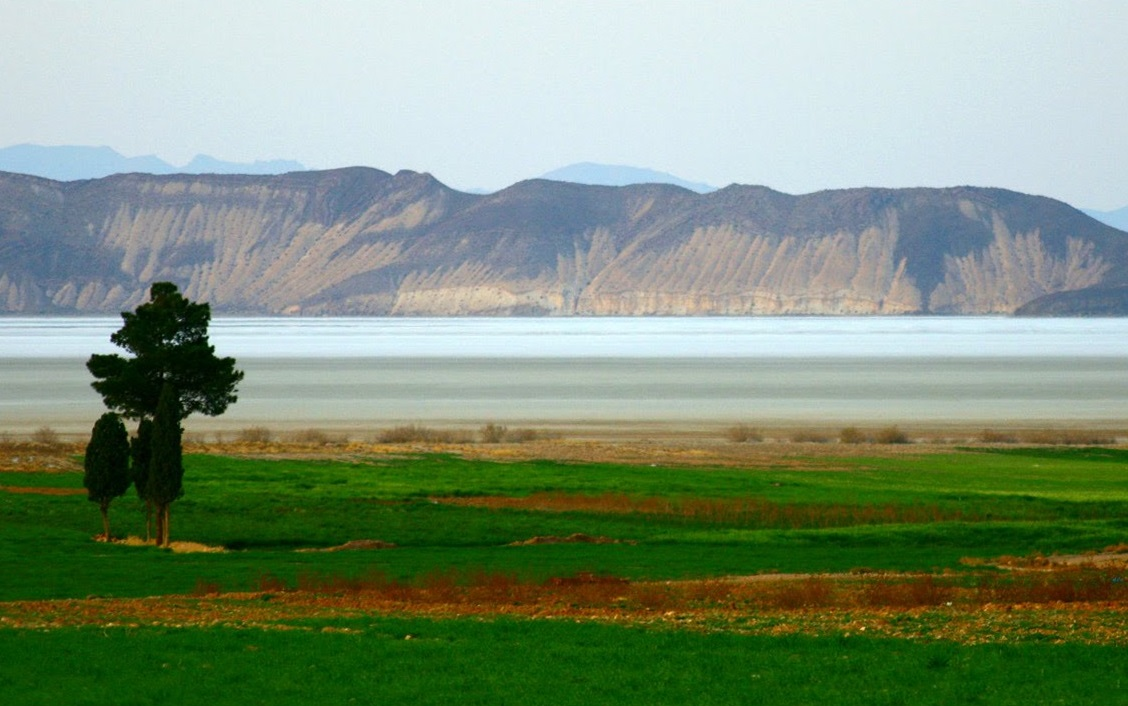
- Former Lake Bakhtegan in the year 2013

- Location within Iran
- Interactive map of Bakhtegan Lake
- Coordinates: 29.3654°N 53.8385°E
- Type: Salt lake
- Primary inflows: Kor River
- Basin countries: Iran
- Surface area: 3,500 km^{2} (1,400 sq mi)
- Islands: Menak Island

Bakhtegan Lake (Persian: دریاچۀ بختگان) was a salt lake in Fars province, southern Iran, about 160 km (99 mi) east of Shiraz and 15 km (9.3 mi) west of the town of Neyriz.

With a surface area of 3,500 square kilometres (1,400 sq mi), Bakhtegan was Iran's second-largest lake. It was fed by the Kor River. The construction of several dams on the Kor River had significantly reduced the water flow into the lake, increased its salinity, and extirpated the lake's populations of flamingos and other migratory birds.

== Description ==
Lake Bakhtegan, once Iran's second largest lake, was fed mostly by the Kur River, while Lake Tashk was fed by overflow from the marshes at its west end and by a large permanent spring in the northwest.

Despite being naturally segregated by narrow strips of land, they used to join to form a single lake during years of heavy rainfall. The lakes became completely dry from 2008 through 2010 and the ecosystem has suffered adverse effects.

== Species ==
Lake Bakhtegan is now completely dry and the living species have either died or moved to other locations.

As of 1992, the lakes supported more than 120,000 ducks and had a population of 50,000 Phoenicopterus ruber.

== Ramsar Designation ==
The two lakes, their delta and spring-fed marshes covering 108,000 hectares (270,000 acres) were designated as Wetlands of International Importance by the Ramsar Convention on Wetlands in 1975.

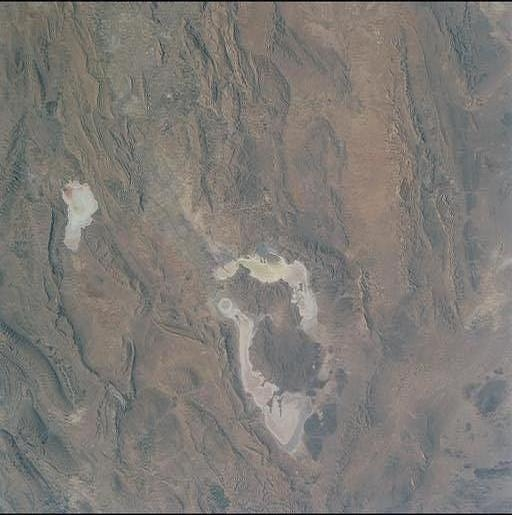
Lake Bakhtegan. Lake Tashk immediately to the north, Lake Maharlou to the west

A documentary covering the Bakhtegan Lake was made by Shahriar Siami in 2007, titled Iran's Wetlands.
