= Saffarid dynasty =

861–1002 Eastern Iranian dynasty

Saffarid dynasty صفاریان Safāriyān
- 861–1002
- Saffarid dynasty at its greatest extent under Ya'qub ibn al-Layth al-Saffar
- Capital: Zaranj (Modern-day Afghanistan)
- Common languages: Persian (administration, mother tongue); Arabic (numismatics)
- Religion: Islam
- Government: Hereditary monarchy
- Amir (Emir)
  - 861–879: Ya'qub ibn al-Layth al-Saffar (first)
  - 963–1002: Khalaf ibn Ahmad (last)
- Historical era: Medieval
  - Established: 861
  - War with Hindu Shahi: 870-900
  - Ghaznavid conquest: 1002
Preceded by
Tahirid dynasty
Abbasid Caliphate
Zunbil dynasty
Succeeded by
Samanid Empire
Ghaznavid Empire

The Saffarid dynasty (Persian: صفاریان, romanized: Safāriyān) was a culturally Persianate dynasty of eastern Iranian origin that ruled over parts of Persia, Khorasan, and eastern Makran from 861 to 1002. One of the first indigenous Persian dynasties to emerge after the Islamic conquest, the Saffarid dynasty was part of the Iranian Intermezzo. The dynasty's founder was Ya'qub ibn al-Layth al-Saffar, who was born in 840 in a small town called Karnin (Qarnin), which was located east of Zaranj and west of Bost, in what is now Afghanistan. A native of Sistan and a local ayyār, Ya'qub worked as a coppersmith (ṣaffār) before becoming a warlord. He seized control of the Sistan region and began conquering most of Iran and Afghanistan, as well as parts of Tajikistan and Uzbekistan.

The Saffarids used their capital Zaranj as a base for an aggressive expansion eastward and westward. They first invaded the areas south of the Hindu Kush, and then overthrew the Tahirid dynasty, annexing Khorasan in 873. By the time of Ya'qub's death, he had conquered the Kabul Valley, Tokharistan, Makran, Kerman, Fars, Khorasan, and nearly reached Baghdad but then suffered a defeat by the Abbasids.

The Saffarid dynasty did not last long after Ya'qub's death. His brother and successor, Amr ibn al-Layth, was defeated at the Battle of Balkh against Ismail Samani in 900. Amr bin Laith was forced to surrender most of his territories to the new rulers. The Saffarids were confined to their heartland of Sistan, and with time, their role was reduced to that of vassals of the Samanids and their successors.

== History ==
=== Founding ===
The dynasty began with Ya'qub ibn al-Layth al-Saffar (Ya'qub, son of Layth, the Coppersmith), a coppersmith of eastern Iranian origins, (Note: Numerous sources call the dynasty Persian.) who moved to the city of Zaranj. He left work to become an Ayyar and eventually got the power to act as an independent ruler. From his capital Zaranj he moved east into al-Rukhkhadj (Arachosia), Zamindawar and ultimately Kabul, by 865 he had vanquished the Zunbils and forced the Hindu Shahis to relocate to Udabhanda. He then invaded Bamyan, Balkh, Badghis, and Ghor. In the name of Islam, he conquered these territories which were predominantly ruled by Buddhist tribal chiefs. He took vast amounts of plunder and slaves from this campaign.

Saffarid coinage in Kabul, with Arabic
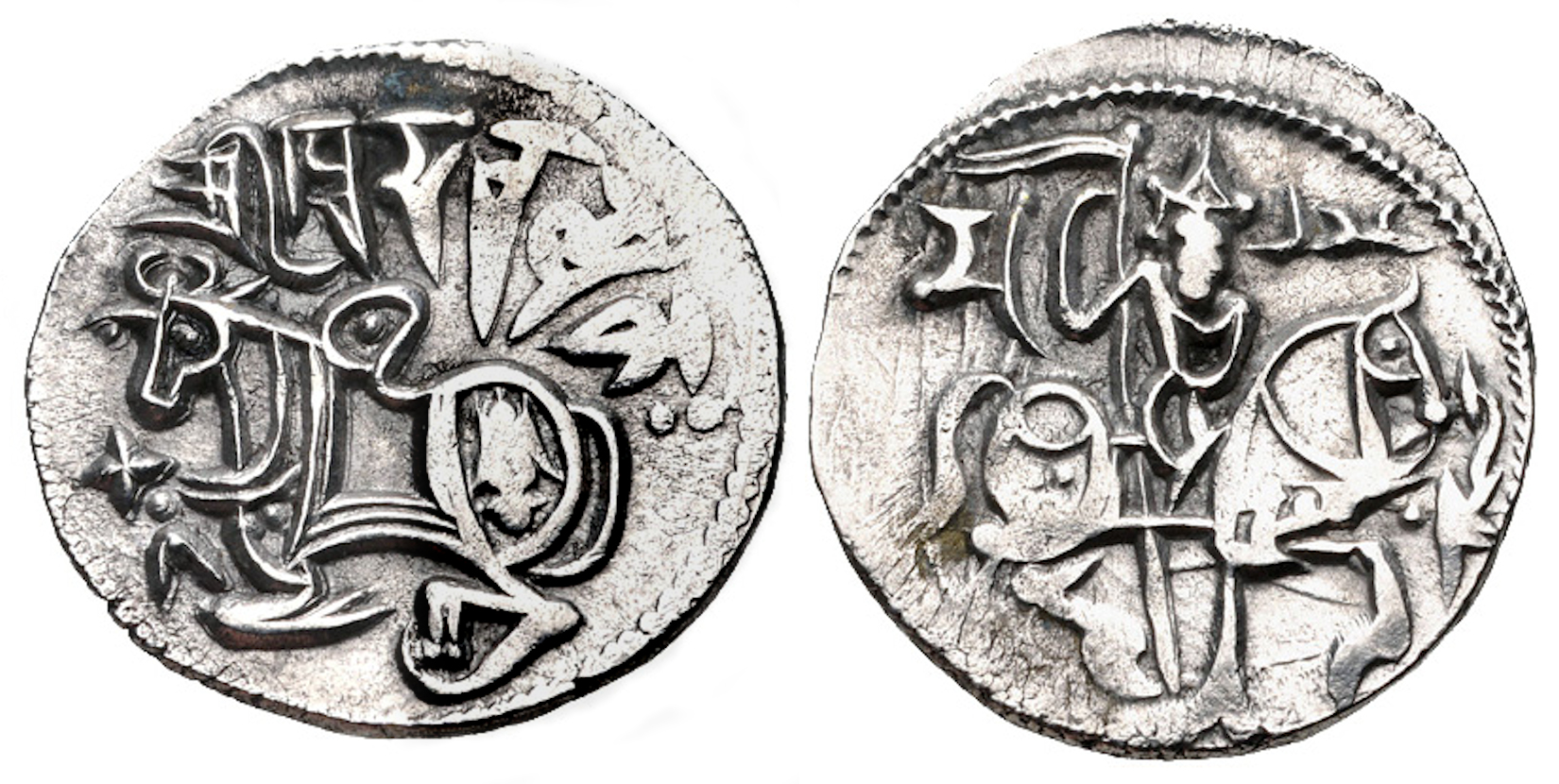
Coinage of the Saffarid Governor of Kabul after the capture of the city, issued around 870 CE in Kabul on the Hindu Shahi model. Abbasid dirham weight standard. Obverse: Recumbent bull with Nagari legend (Śrī Khūdarayakah, "The fortunate small Raja"), trisula mark on the hump of the bull. Reverse: horseman with (ma) in Nagari to left, عدل ('adl, "Justice") in Arabic to right.

=== Expansion ===
The Tahirid city of Herat was captured in 870, and Ya'qub's campaign in the Badghis region led to the capture of Kharidjites which later formed the Djash al-Shurat contingent in his army. Ya'qub then turned his focus to the west and began attacks on Khorasan, Khuzestan, Kerman (Southeastern Iran) and Fars (southwestern Iran). The Saffarids then seized Khuzestan and parts of southern Iraq, and in 876 came close to overthrowing the Abbasids, whose army was able to turn them back only within a few days' march from Baghdad. From silver mines in the Panjshir Valley, the Saffarids were able to mint silver coins.

These incursions, however, forced the Abbasid caliphate to recognize Ya'qub as governor of Sistan, Fars and Kerman, and Saffarids were even offered key posts in Baghdad. Despite Ya'qub's military successes, he was not an empire builder since he had no concept of a centralized government.

=== Decline ===
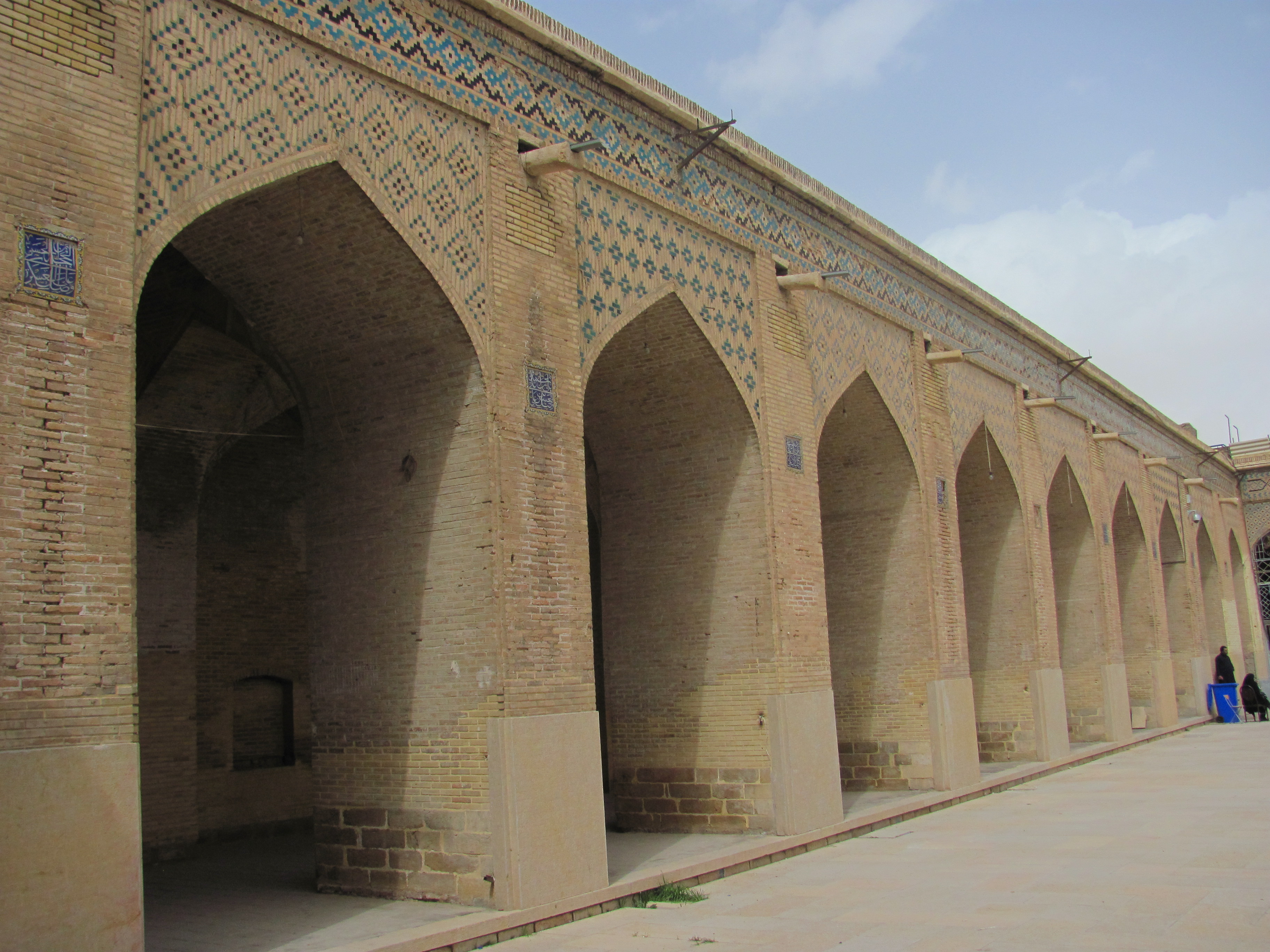
Atigh Jameh Mosque of Shiraz, established in 894.

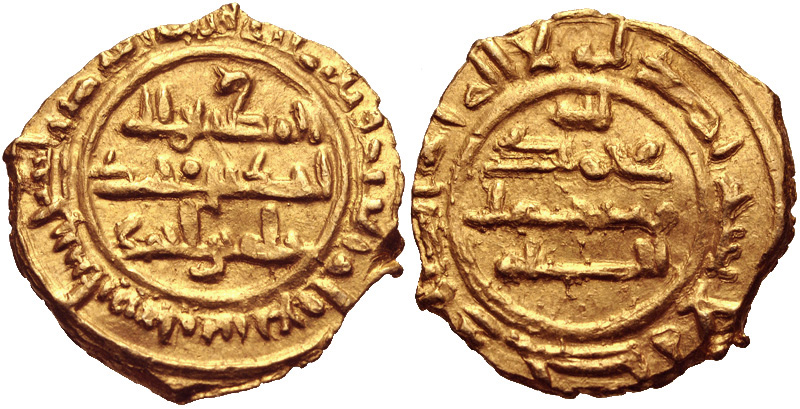
Coinage of Abu Ja'far Ahmad ibn Muhammad.

In 901, Amr ibn al-Layth was defeated at the battle of Balkh by the Samanids, and they lost Khorasan to them. The Saffarids were reduced to the provinces of Fars, Kerman and Sistan. Under Tahir ibn Muhammad ibn Amr (901–908), the dynasty fought the Abbasids for the possession of Fars to maintain its control over the province. However, in 908, a civil war erupted between Tahir and the pretender al-Layth ibn Ali in Sistan. In the next years, the governor of Fars, Sebük-eri defected to the Abbasids. In 912, the Samanids finally expelled the Saffarids from Sistan. Sistan passed briefly to Abbasid control, but became independent again under the Saffarid Abu Ja'far Ahmad ibn Muhammad; but now the dynasty was a minor power isolated in Sistan.

In 1002, Mahmud of Ghazni invaded Sistan, dethroned Khalaf ibn Ahmad and finally ended the Saffarid dynasty.

== Culture ==
The Saffarids patronized the Persian language in the form of court poetry and established Persianate culture. Under their rule, the eastern Islamic world witnessed the emergence of prominent Persian poets such as Fayrouz Mashriqi, Abu Salik al-Jirjani, and Muhammad ibn Wasif, who was a court poet.

In the later 9th century, the Saffarids gave impetus to a renaissance of New Persian literature and culture. Following Ya'qub's conquest of Herat, some poets chose to celebrate his victory in Arabic, whereupon Ya'qub requested his secretary, Muhammad bin Wasif al-Sistani, to compose those verses in Persian.

== Religion ==
The religion of the Saffarids, particularly its founder Ya'qub, has been a topic of debate. The majority of the sources are hostile to the Saffarids giving many contradictory claims: Ibn Khallikan claims he was a Khariji, Nizam al-Mulk as an Isma'ili, Hamdallah Mustawfi as an extremist Shi'ite intent on destroying Islam, while the official Abbasid propaganda of al-Mu'tamid went unusually far, publicly condemning Ya'qub via a formal missive, even claiming he was a Christian, suggesting he threatened their legitmacy beyond that of a typical rebel. The Abbasids also seem to have created propaganda that he was a Persian nationalist. (Note: The renown poet and Abbasid courtier Ibn Mamshadh was likely sent to Ya'qub by al-Muwaffaq, where he composed Arabic poetry praising the ancient Persian Kings and deriding the Abbasids and Arabs in general, which was very dissimilar from any other poetry from Ya'qub's court. He was later executed by Ya'qub as an Abbasid spy.) However, al-Ya'qubi, the only contemporary source and only source written before the 875 march on Baghdad and the subsequent Abbasid-Samanid propaganda which followed, declared the Saffarid as a righteous holy warrior fighting on command of the Caliph. Modern scholars like C. E. Bosworth ascribe to the dynasty the lack of any major religious beliefs and Kharijite sympathies. While archeologist Barry Cunliffe, states the Saffarids were Shi'a Muslim.

However, more recent scholarship has shown that the religious figures who actually accompanied and supported the Saffarids in their time were not just Sunnis, they were some of the most respected Ahl al-Hadith scholars of their age: the fervently orthodox proto-Hanbalis.

Even before the rise of Ya'qub, one of the leading scholars of Zaranj, the Hanafi Uthman ibn Affan al-Sijzi student of Mutamir ibn Sulayman, (Note: and perhaps son of the muhaddith Affan ibn Muslim) who'd worked with the Tahirids previously, supported the Sistani Ayyar movement and was later entrusted by Ya'qub to give the khutbah in Sistan whilst he was on campaign. Ya'qub held Uthman in great reverence, and later when in Fars, he was personally accompanied by the province's greatest muhaddith: Yaqub ibn Sufyan Al-Fasawi, teacher of both al-Tirmidhi and al-Nasa'i, tasking him with defending the honor of Uthman al-Sijzi. Ya'qub also appointed the hadith scholar and linguist Abu Amr Shimr ibn Hamdawayh al-Harawi to office.

One of the most powerful political supporters of the Saffarids was the Tahirid administrative officer of all Khurasan: Khalid ibn Ahmed al-Dhuhli, who was also a muhaddith in his own right as a student of Ishaq ibn Rahwayh. He among other Tahirid scholars, notables and even family members became disillusioned with Tahirid ineptitude and invited Ya'qub to replace them. His support of the Saffarids was to such an extent that even a decade later in 882/3 the Caliph imprisoned him for it till his death.

In Nishapur, the mainstay of Saffarid support was from one of the three most preeminent Hadith scholars in the world at the time: Muhammad ibn Yahya Dhuhli, a theological watchdog of the Hanbalis, the most knowledgeable of Ibn Shihab al-Zuhri’s narrations, whom Ahmad ibn Hanbal himself (staunchest of the ahl al-Hadith) would rise for. His son Yahya (known as Haykan), whose knowledge, according to al-Mizzi, eclipsed even his father's, would in the time of Amr personally lead the scholars of Nishapur in battle against the anti-Saffarid Kharijite usurper al-Khujistani until he was gruesomely killed. (Note: He was executed by having his private parts pulled.)

Clearly showing that these paragons of Sunnism of impeccable repute who backed the Saffarids were not reluctant, but willing supporters, actively engaged with the Saffarid cause: travelling with them, leading the prayer in their absence, making deliberate efforts to replace Tahirid rule with Saffarid governance, fighting and even dying alongside them.

Thus D. G. Tor casts Ya'qub and the Ayyar movement as a whole as tracing back to the late 8th century "emperor of the Ulama": Abd Allah ibn al-Mubarak and his fellows Abu Ishaq al-Fazari, Abd al-Rahman al-Awza'i, Ibrahim ibn Adham as well as the other great traditionist (mainly Khurasani) warrior-scholars of the Byzantine and later Turkic frontiers known as the mutaṭawwiʿa, the volunteer border warriors for the faith. These muṭaṭawwi'a represented a form of privatized holy war, taking up the mantle of guarding the frontiers in wake of the Caliphate's neglect of this duty from the late Umayyad period onward. Forming an independent source of military power, paramilitary bands loyal to their own pious ideals rather than any government.

Ya'qub himself was named as a mutatawwi by many sources even by those against the dynasty, such as the extremely hostile Ibn Khallikan, who repeatedly uses the term mutatawwi, though he bizarrely follows this up with claims that part of Ya'qub's army consisted of Christians and infidels. Similarly, the defeated Tahirid subgovernor of Herat, the Samanid Ibrahim b. Ilyas b. Asad, described Ya'qub as being of "a ghazi nature". Also the negative account of the caliphal spy master of Fars who admits that "God had bestowed upon him volunteer fighting for religion (taṭawwu'), religiosity" and that he was a vanquisher of heretics.

According to this view, Ya'qub was a pious Sunni holy warrior, fighting the external jihad against the Zunbil and internally a defender of Sunni orthodoxy against unorthodox groups like the Kharijites or Zaydis of Tabaristan, and refusing to ally with the Zanj against the caliph despite the advantage that would bring, due to their heresies. Tor sees his march on Baghdad as an attempt to replace an ineffectual caliph who was actively hampering the fight against the heretics, with a competent and powerful Abbasid caliph that Ya'qub could fight behind for the restoration of Islam’s glory. A. C. S. Peacock has called Tor’s argument convincing, (Note: Though he says that Tor overstates her case in trying to present the Samanid historiography as deliberate propaganda campaign to discredit the Saffarids, but this mainly rests on presumed lost Samanid works rather than surviving evidence. She also overemphasizes the Saffarid-Samanid rivalry over legitimacy as Ghazis - which the Samanids did cultivate on occasion - by clinging onto the single late phrase of Mustawfi labelling the Samanids as Ayyars. Also much of the Transoxianan Jihad was still in private hands.) and Mohsen Rahmati has called it persuasive.

== List of rulers ==
1. Ya'qub ibn al-Layth, 861–879
2. Amr ibn al-Layth, brother of Ya'qub, 879–901
3. Tahir ibn Muhammad, grandson of Amr, 901–908
4. Al-Layth ibn Ali, nephew of Amr, 908–910
5. Muhammad ibn Ali, brother of Al-Layth, 910–911
6. Al-Mu'addal ibn Ali, brother of Al-Layth, 911
7. Amr ibn Ya'qub, nephew of Tahir, 912–913 (Note: Samanid occupation from 911 to 912 and 913 to 922.)
8. Ahmad ibn Muhammad, distant cousin of Ya'qub, 922–963
9. Khalaf ibn Ahmad, son of Ahmad, 963–1002

== Family tree ==
Family tree of the Saffarid dynasty

Al-Layth
Khalaf	Amr r. 879–901	Ya'qub r. 861–879	Ali
Muhammad	Muhammad	Al-Layth r. 908–910	Muhammad r. 910–911	Al-Mu'addal r. 911
Ahmad r. 922–963	Tahir r. 901–908	Ya'qub
Khalaf r. 963–1002	Amr r. 912–913

== See also ==
- Iranian Intermezzo
- Nasrid dynasty (Sistan)
- Mihrabanids
- Samanids
- Ghaznavids
- Muhammad ibn Wasif
- List of kings of Persia
- Hindu Shahi–Saffarid wars

== Sources ==
- Baumer, Christoph (2016). The History of Central Asia: The Age of Islam and the Mongols. Vol. Three. I.B. Tauris. p. 24. ISBN 978-1-78453-490-5.
- Bosworth, C. E. (1969). "The Ṭāhirids and Persian Literature". Iran. 7: 104. doi:10.2307/4299615. JSTOR 4299615.
- Bosworth, C.E. (1975). "The Ṭāhirids and Șaffārids". In Frye, R.N. (ed.). The Cambridge History of Iran. Vol. 4:The Period from the Arab invasion to the Saljuqs. Cambridge University Press. pp. 90–135.
- Bosworth, C. E. (1995). "Saffarids". In Bosworth, C. E.; van Donzel, E.; Heinrichs, W. P.; Lecomte, G. (eds.). Encyclopedia of Islam. Vol. VIII:NED-SAM. Brill. pp. 795–798.
- Cunliffe, Barry W. (2015). By Steppe, Desert, and Ocean: The Birth of Eurasia. Oxford University Press. pp. 388–389. ISBN 9780199689170. "The Sunni Samanids eventually annexed the territories of the Shi'ite Saffarids in 908, creating a powerful emirate bounded by the Pamir, the Caspian Sea, the Iranian plateau, and the steppe."
- Dabashi, Hamid (2019). The Shahnameh: The Persian Epic in World Literature. Columbia University Press. ISBN 978-0231544948.
- Flood, Finbarr B. (20 March 2018). Objects of Translation: Material Culture and Medieval "Hindu-Muslim" Encounter. Princeton University Press. ISBN 978-0-691-18074-8.
- Meisami, Julie Scott (1999). Persian Historiography to the End of the Twelfth Century. Edinburgh University Press. ISBN 978-0748612765.
- Tor, D.G. (2002), "Historical Representations of Ya‘qūb b. al-Layth al-Ṣaffār: A Reappraisal," Journal of the Royal Asiatic Society
- Tor, D.G. (2007). Violent Order: Religious Warfare, Chivalry, and the ʻAyyār Phenomenon in the Medieval Islamic World. Orient-Institut-Istanbul.
- Bosworth, C. E.; van Donzel, E.; Heinrichs, W. P.; Lecomte, G., eds. (1995). "Pandjhir". The Encyclopaedia of Islam. Vol. VIII:NED-SAM. Brill. p. 258.
