= Latif al-Ani =

Iraqi photographer (1932–2021)

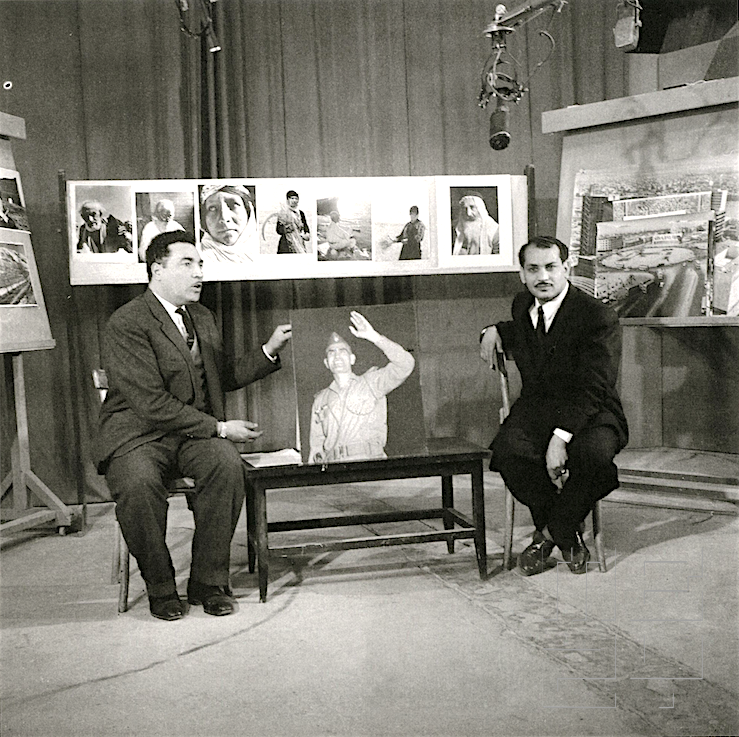
- Latif al-Ani (right) in an interview on TV
- Born: 1932; Baghdad, Iraq
- Died: 18 November 2021 (aged 89); Baghdad, Iraq
- Known for: Photographer

Latif al-Ani (Arabic: لطيف العاني, 1932 – 18 November 2021) was an Iraqi photographer, often known as "the father of Iraqi photography" and noted for his photographic works that combine both ancient and modern themes. During his active career from the 1950s through to the late 1970s, he chronicled an Iraqi way of life that was rapidly being lost as the country embarked on a modernization program. He documented people, ancient monuments and many facets of urban life in Iraq. He stopped taking photographs following the rise of Saddam Hussein, as he was unable to maintain his former optimistic outlook for Iraq's future.

== Early life ==
Latif al-Ani was born in Baghdad in 1932. During his childhood, relatively few commercial photographers were operating in Iraq. The social and religious prohibitions on making images and figurative representations meant that Iraq was relatively late-adopter of photography and cinematography. A handful of photographers and film-makers, such as Abd al-Karim Tiouti and Murad al-Daghistani, had been operating in Basra and Mosul since the late 19th-century and the early 20th-century, but opportunities for young Iraqis to learn the art of photography were rare. It was not until the late 1940s, when al-Ani was an adolescent that the number of commercial photographic studios in Iraq's major cities, including Baghdad, proliferated.

Al-Ani was first exposed to photography when, as a boy, he would help in his older brother's Mutanabbi Street shop which was adjacent to the studio of a Jewish photographer, by the name of Nissan. The young Al-Ani was fascinated. Noting the boy's interest, al-Ani's brother bought him a camera, a Kodak box, in around 1947, when al-Ani was 15 years. After that, the camera never left his side. His earliest photos were of the everyday scenes and objects in his immediate surroundings- street life, palms, plants, faces and people on rooftops. This type of subject matter would become a recurring theme in his work.

== Career in photography ==
In the 1950s, he seized the opportunity to embark on a career in photography. A friend of al-Ani's, Aziz Ajam, was working as an editor for the Iraqi Petroleum Company's in-house magazine. Al-Ani applied for a traineeship there, and in 1954, he began working under the direction of Jack Percival, and effectively became his apprentice. While at IPC, al-Ani learned all aspects of photography, including aerial work. As a staff member of the IPC, he took photographs for the company’s Arabic-language magazine, Ahl al-Naf [People of Oil] under Percival's watchful eye.

In 1960, he founded the Photography Department at the Ministry of Information (subsequently renamed Ministry of Culture). At the time, he was one of the very few people in Iraq who knew how to develop color photographs. He hired an assistant, Halim al-Khatat, who later became a well-known photographer. His department published the magazine, New Iraq, (in five languages: Arabic, Kurdish, English, French and German) which was distributed to foreign diplomatic communities and international organizations operating in Iraq. During this period, al-Ani travelled extensively documenting Iraqi social life and culture, industry, agriculture, workers, machinery and development. This type of work was not only a good fit with al-Ani's own preoccupations, but also fitted with the government’s socialist agenda. Al-Ani explains his motivations:

"It started with the revolution of 1958. This past is being deleted; it has been deleted. I felt there would be no stability. Men were eaten up and newcomers came. Pandora’s box was opened and ignorant people came to rule, who had no culture or understanding of the power they held. Fear was a major motive to document everything as it was. I did all that I could to document, to safeguard that time."

For his role in chronicling the so-called golden age of Iraq, al-Ani has been labelled as the "father of Iraqi photography".

In the 1970s, he was appointed the Head of photography at the Iraqi News Agency. This provided further opportunities to document the social and cultural life of Iraq. Throughout his career, he felt compelled to record a way of life that he feared was being lost as the country embarked on a period of 'modernisation'. Al-Ani was an optimist and “wanted to show Iraq as a civilized, modern place.” At the same time, he was proud of Iraq's ancient Sumerian and Mesopotamian past.

Al-Ani had an instinct for juxtaposing the layers of Iraq's ancient art heritage with distinctly modern themes. His work has been influenced by mid-20th century Iraqi artists, including Jawad Saleem. For example, his portrait of the US Couple in Ctesiphon shows an American couple visiting the Taq Kisra (arch at Ctesiphon) in the background, while they listen to an elderly Bedouin man seated on the ground playing the rabab.

In the 1960s and 70s he enjoyed international success, working and exhibiting in the Middle East, Europe and the United States. However, he stopped taking photographs in 1979 when Saddam Hussein's government placed a ban on taking photographs in public. Not only was it dangerous to take photographs in public, but al-Ani had lost his optimistic outlook for Iraq's future.

== Later life ==
After al-Ani's retirement, his work was virtually forgotten. He recalled stopping at a news kiosk in 2005 where they were giving away free calendars; and upon inspection, he realized that more than half of the photographs were his own work, but reproduced without any attribution to him since no one knew the photographer. His contribution to Iraqi art and culture was 'rediscovered' by a team from the Ruya Foundation, who were working to preserve Iraq's artistic heritage and came across al-Ani's collection. In late 2017, they mounted a solo exhibition of Al-Ani's work at Coningsby Gallery in London. This event, combined with the publication of a monograph about the artist, stirred considerable interest in the photographer and his work.

Al-Ani died on 18 November 2021, at the age of 89 in Baghdad.

== Work ==
The majority of his photographs are in black and white. His ability to combine Iraq's ancient art heritage within a contemporary format suggests that he was influenced by mid-20th century Iraqi artists, including Jawad Saleem.

As with many Iraqi artists, much of his archive was destroyed or looted during the US invasion of Iraq of 2003. The archive of Arab Image Foundation in Beirut has collected several hundred surviving photographs by al-Ani.

Selected list of published photographs

- Lady in the Eastern Desert
- US Couple in Ctesiphon
- Haidar-Khana Mosque, Rashid Street, Baghdad
- Building the Darbandikhan Dam
- Al Malak, Baghdad
- Architecture in Baghdad, Bab al-Muadham
Gallery of some of al-Ani's photographs

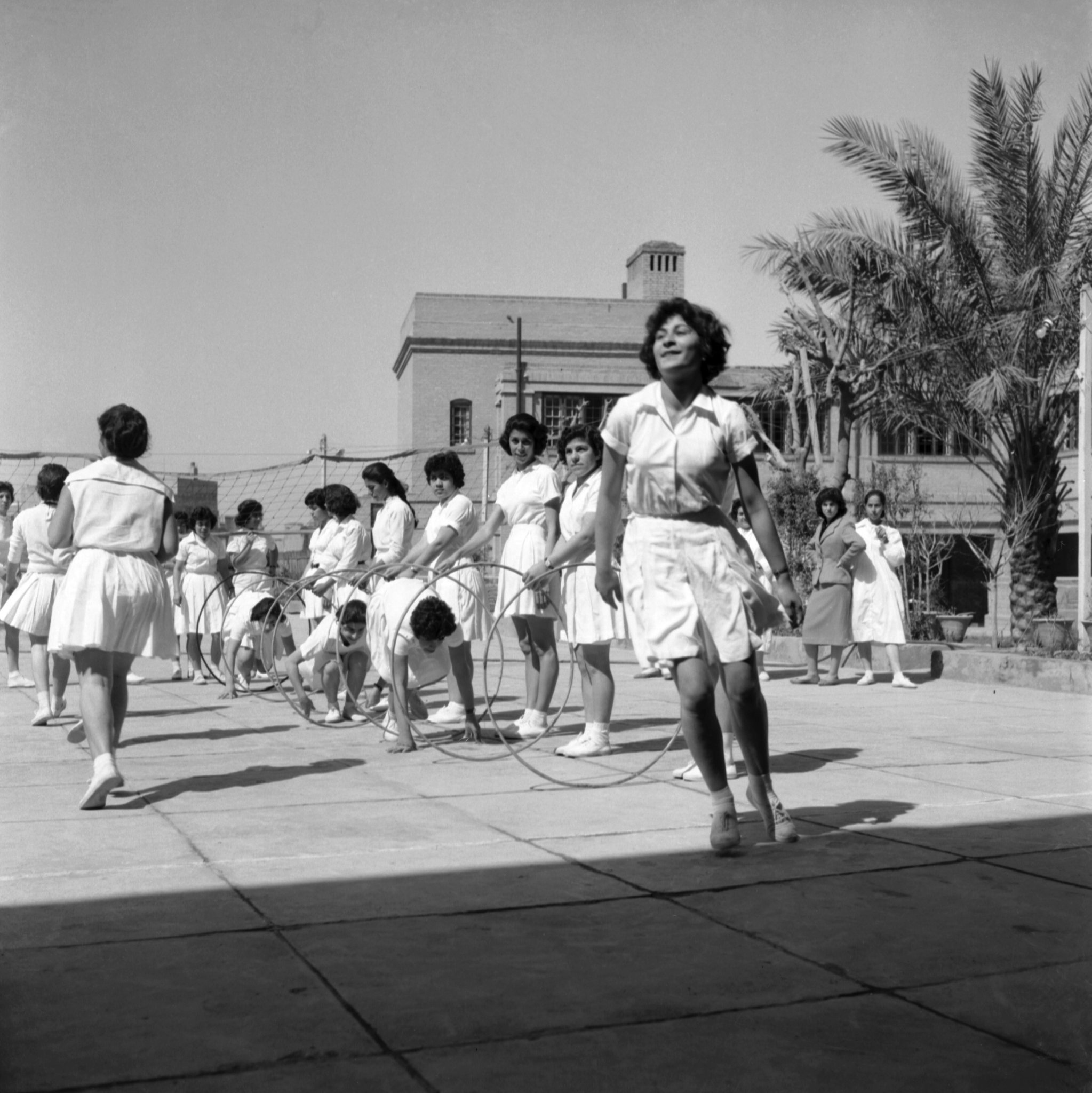
Al-Aqida secondary school, Baghdad, 1961

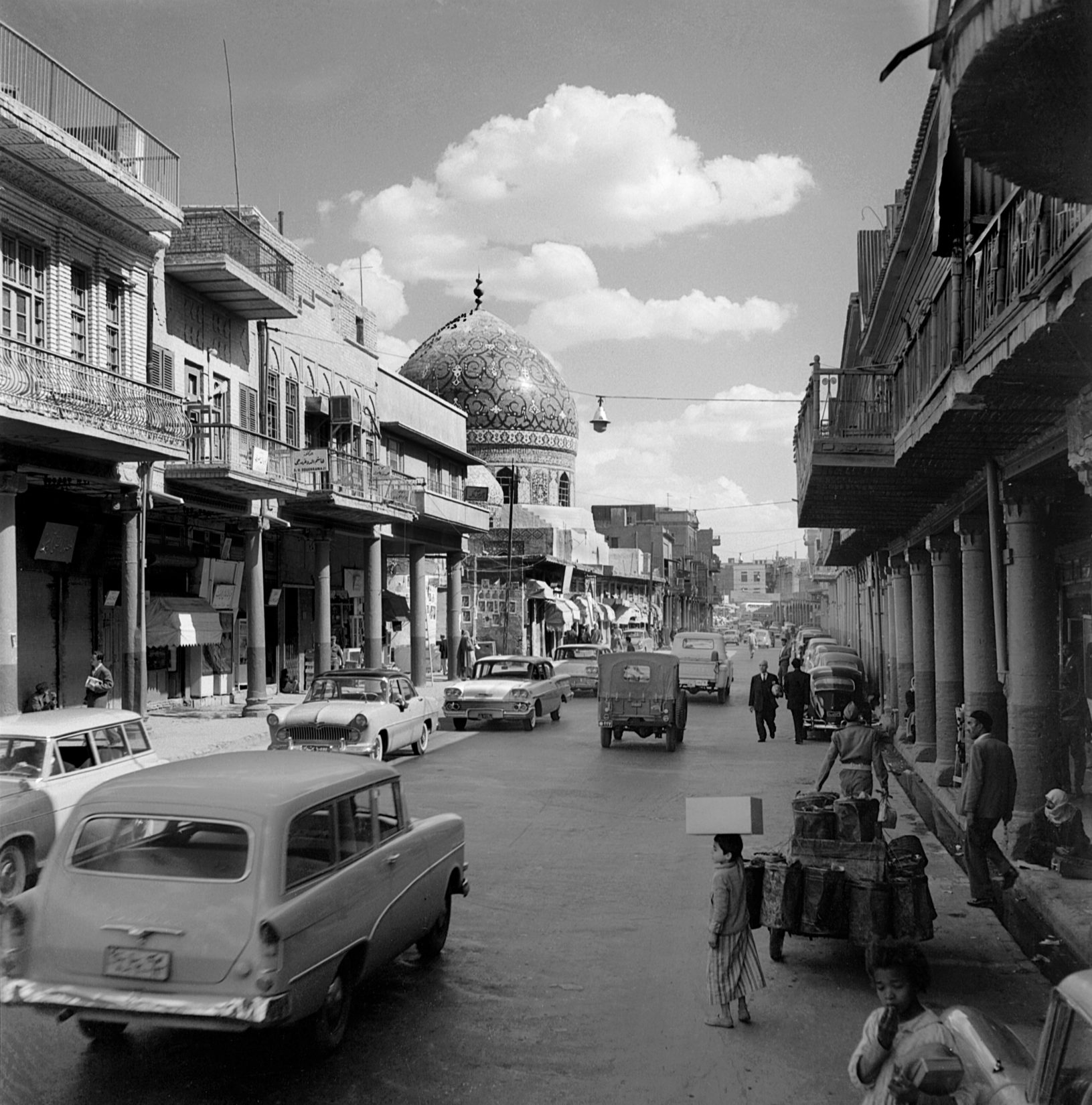
Al-Rasheed Street along with Haydar-Khana Mosque, 1961

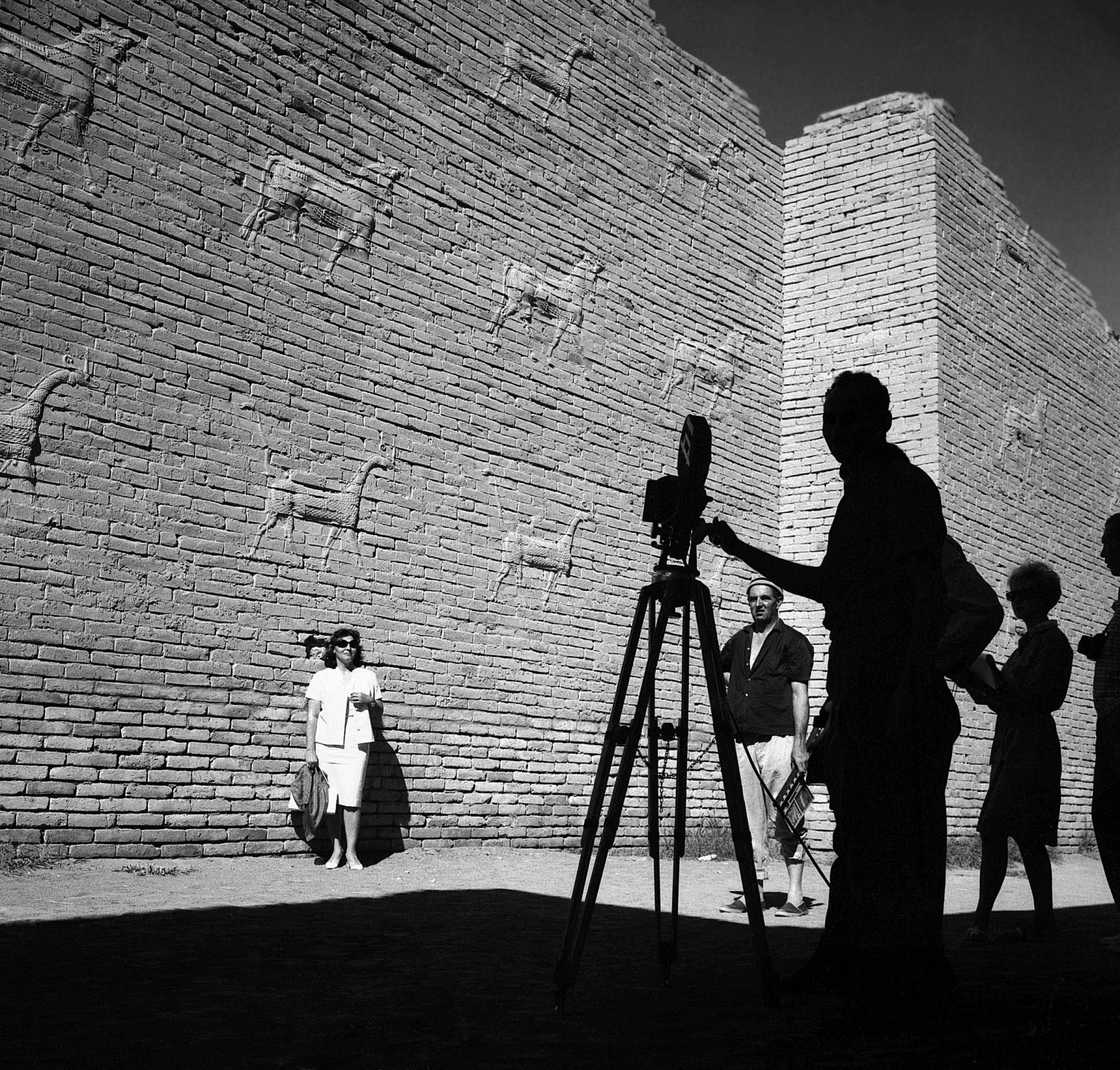
Babylon, Iraq, 1970

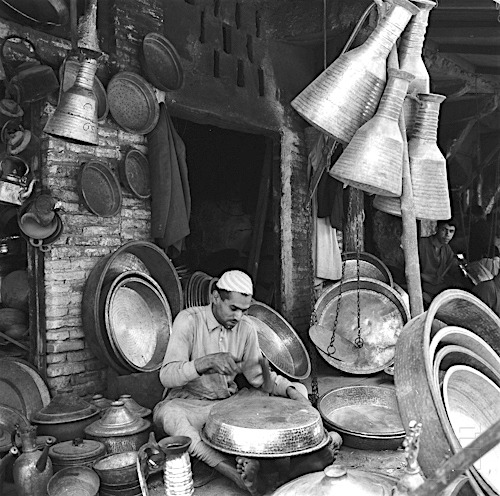
A Coppersmith at Souk al-Safafeer, Baghdad, 1962

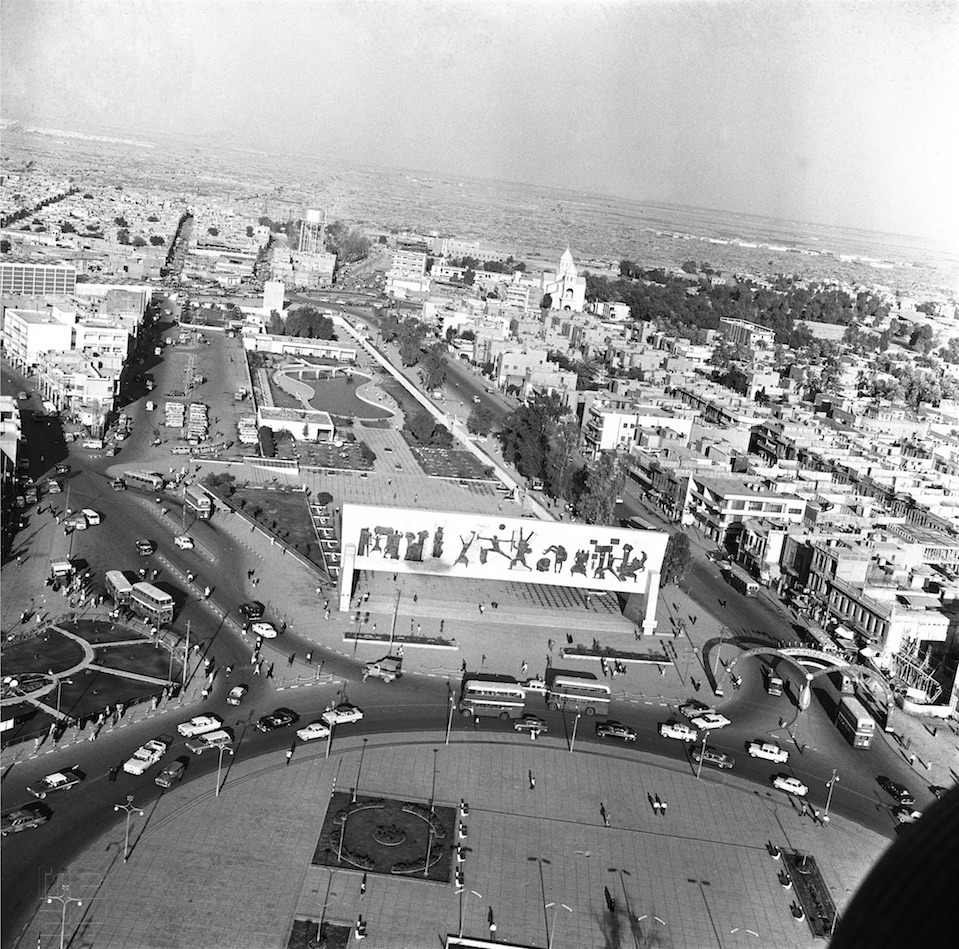
Liberty Monument and Umma Park, Baghdad, 1961

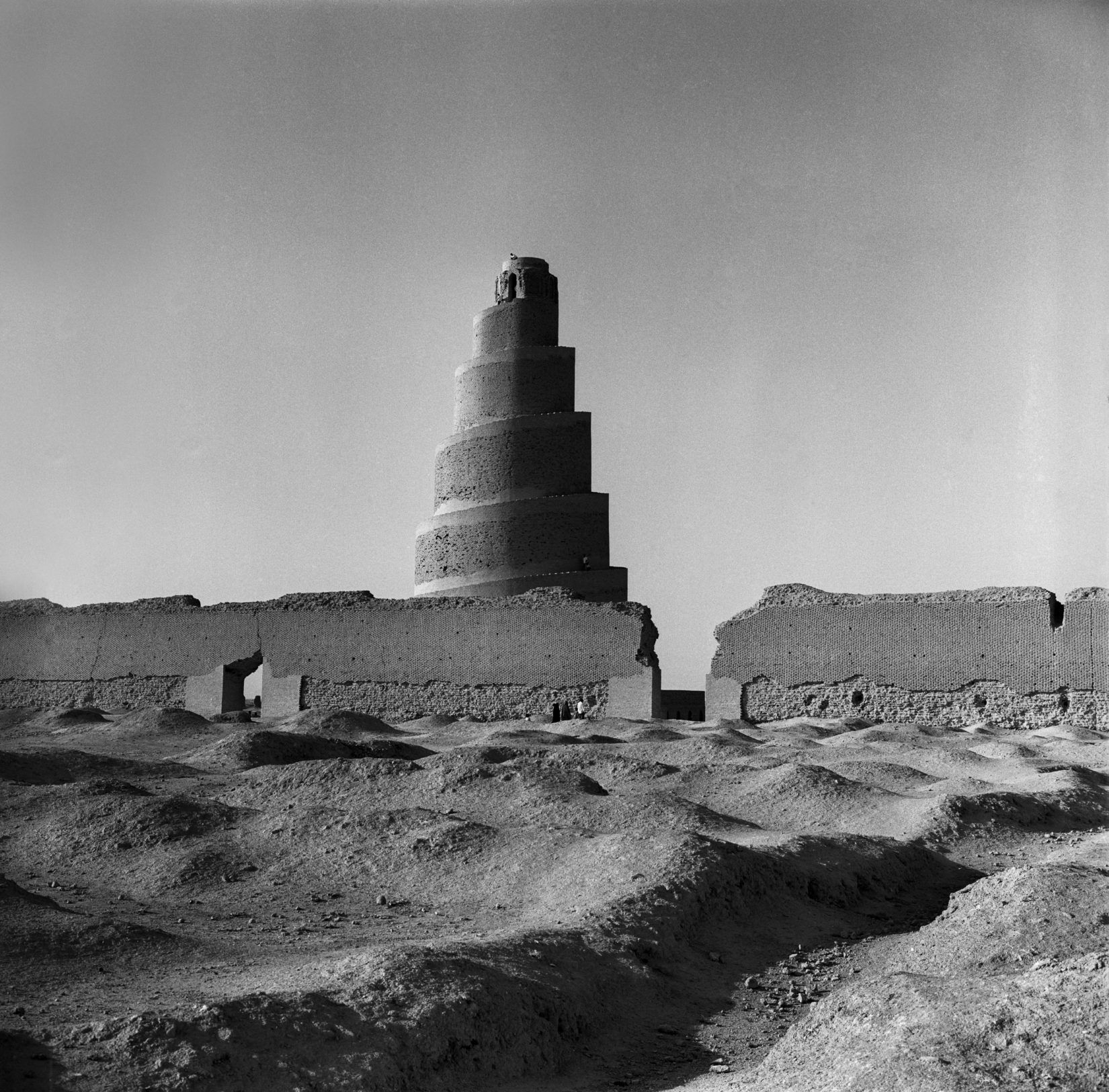
Malwiya, Samarra, 1960

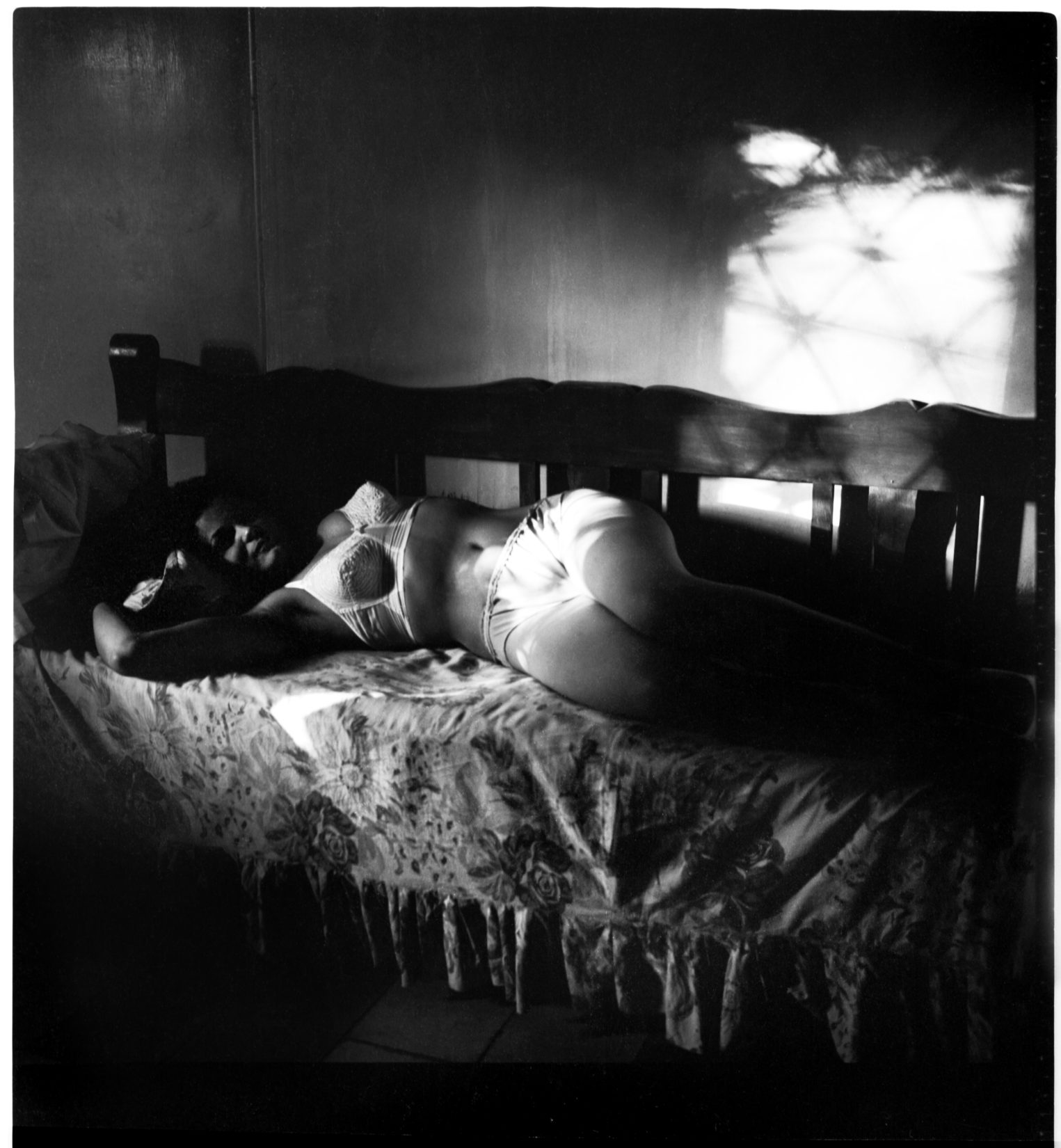
Model, Baghdad, 1956

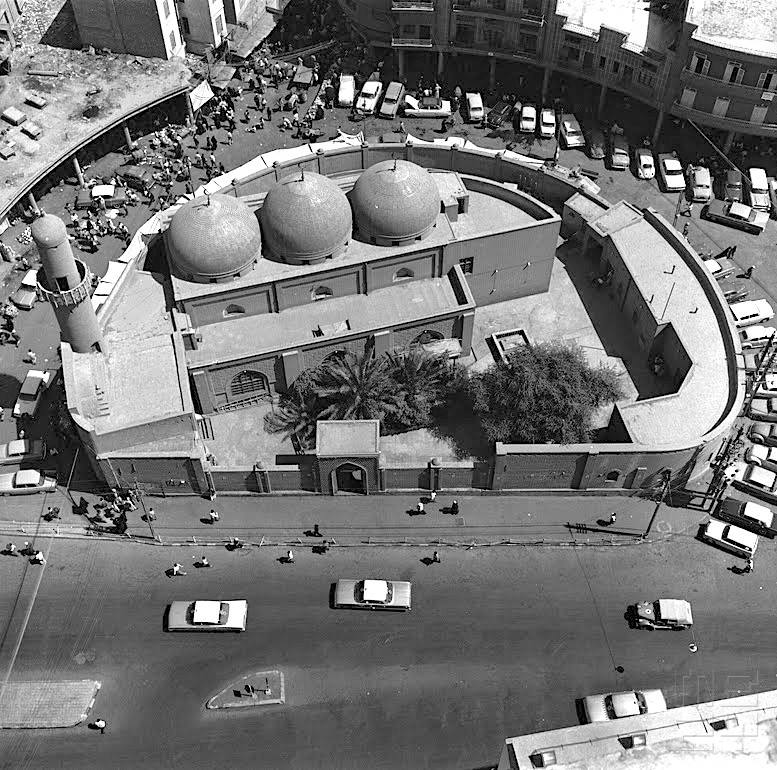
Murjan Mosque, Baghdad, 1962

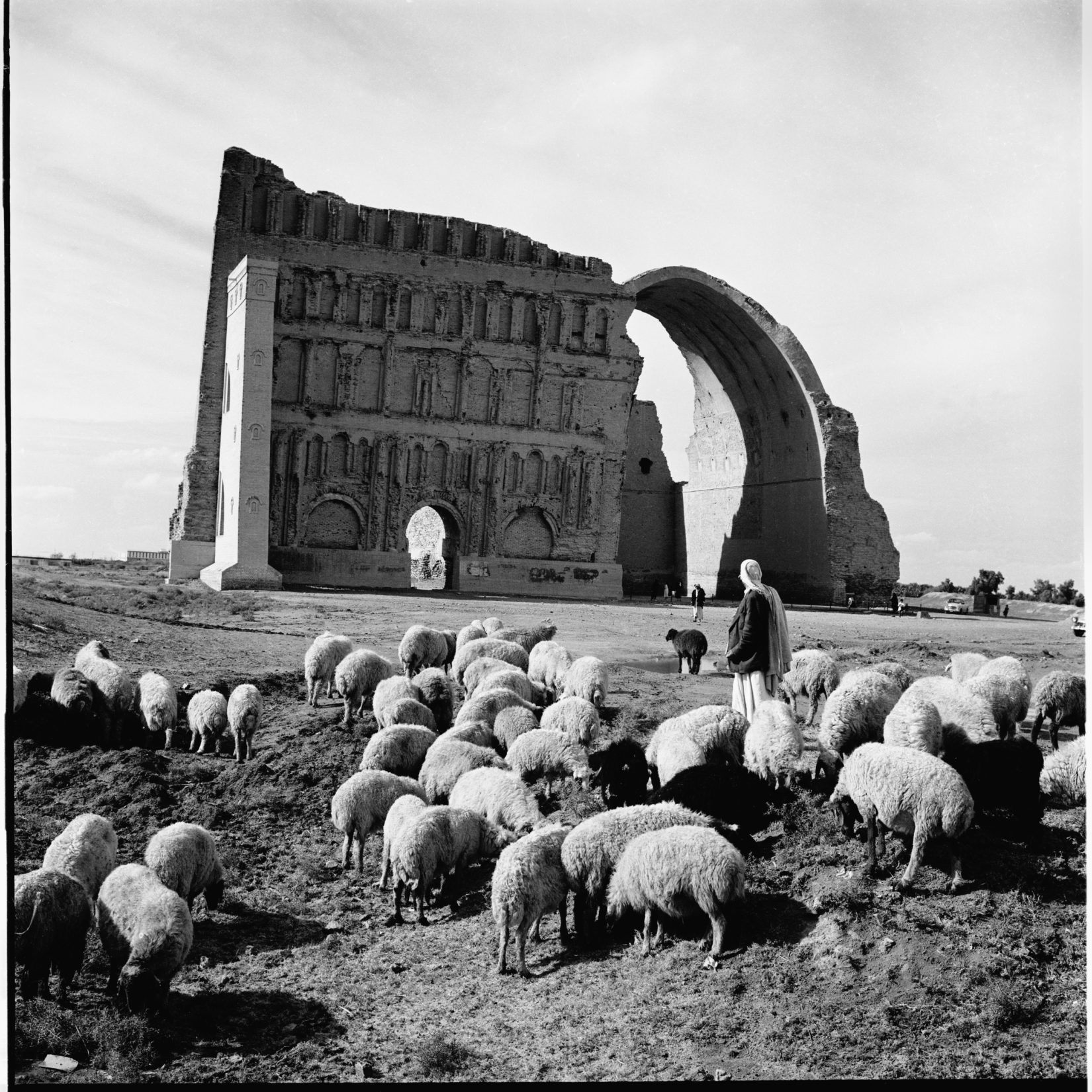
Taq-i Kisra, Baghdad, 1963

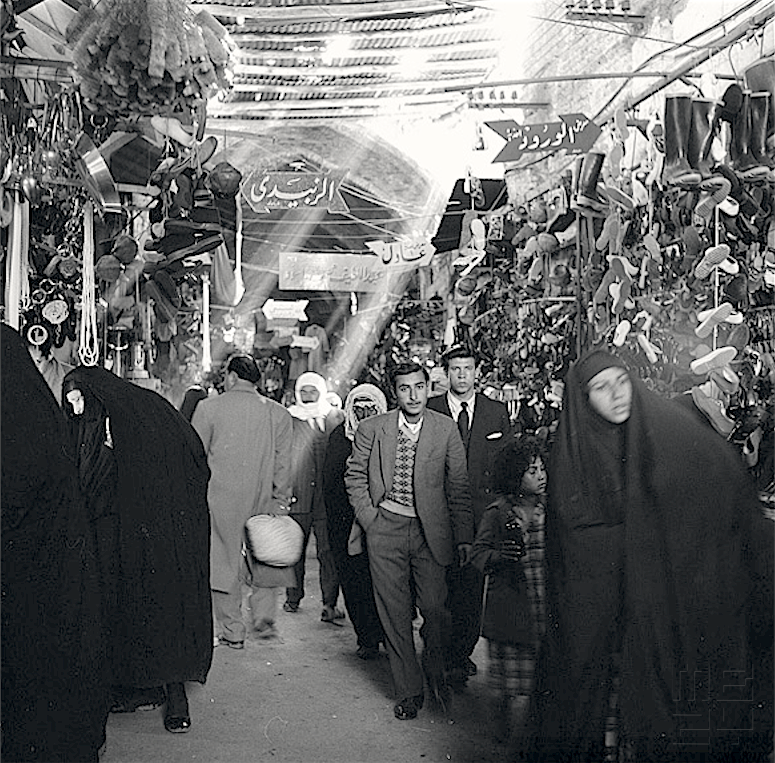
Traditional market, Baghdad, 1961

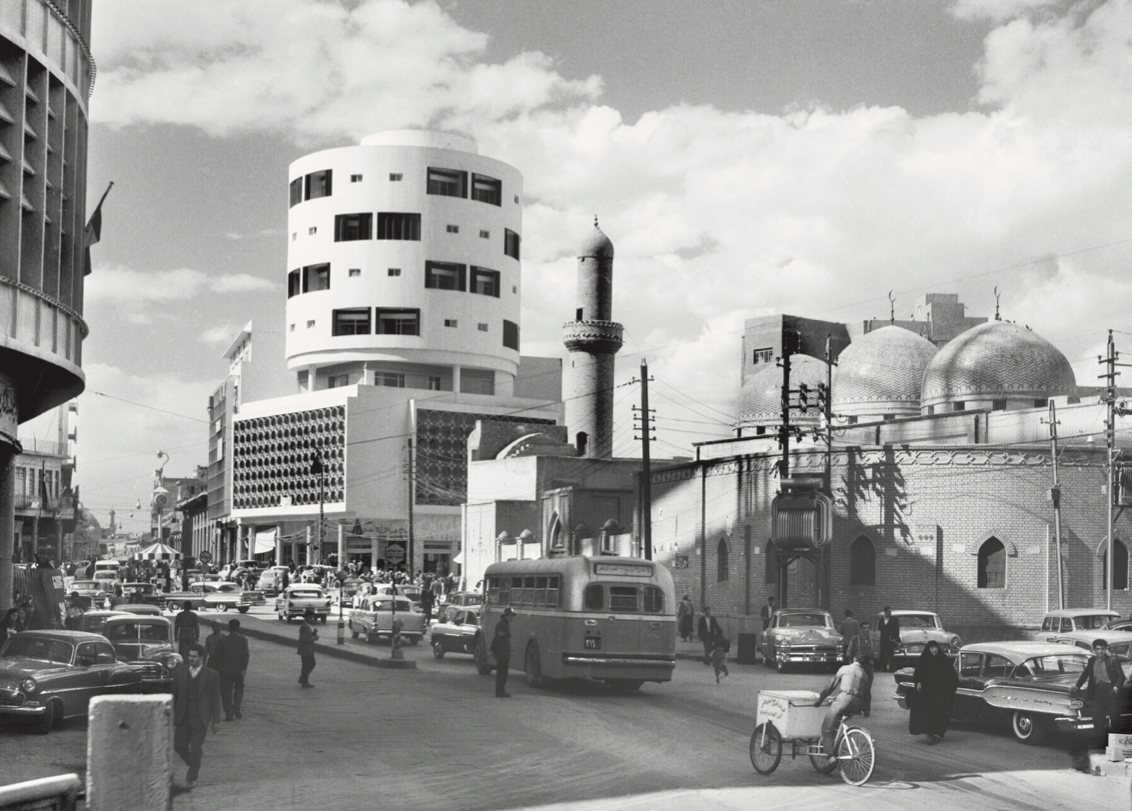
Murjan Mosque and the Abboud Building, 1960

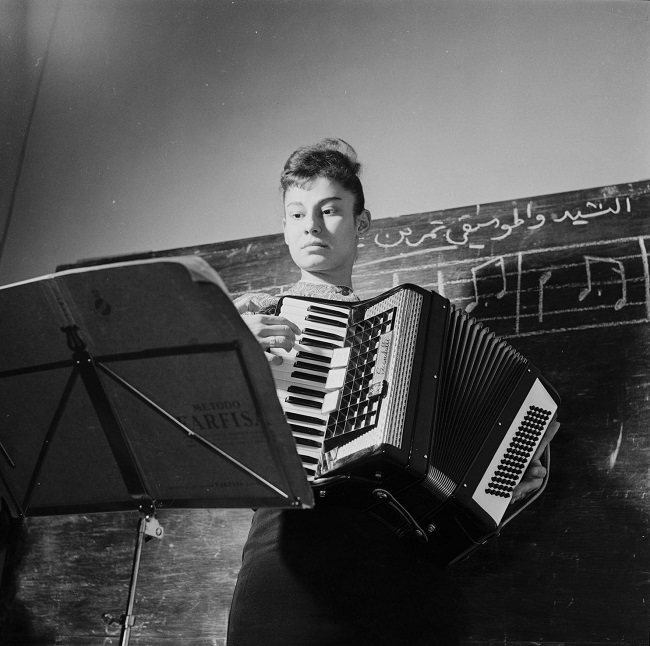
Music class in a Baghdadi school, 1960

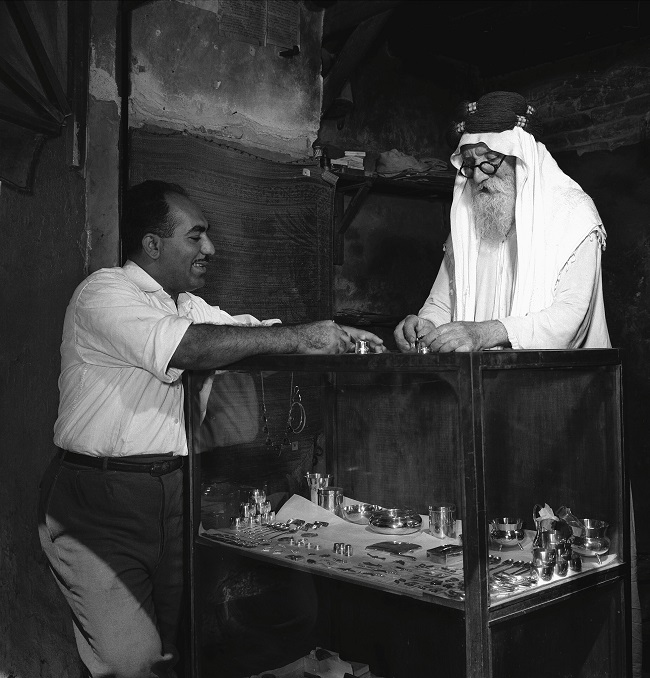
Mandean jeweler, 1960

== Critical reception ==
He is the subject of two books and a documentary film:

- Tamara Chalabi and Morad Montazami, Latif Al Ani, Hajte Cantz, 2017, ISBN 978-3-7757-4270-2
- Hoor Al Qasimi, Kathleen Butti and Muʼassasaẗ al-Šāriqaẗ li-l-funūn, Latif Al Ani: Through the Lens, 1953-1979, Sharjah Art Foundation, 2018
- Iraq's Invisible Beauty, 2023 documentary film by Belgian-Kurdish filmmaker Sahim Omar Kalifa and Belgian director Jurgen Buedts

== See also ==
- History of photography
- Iraqi art
- List of Iraqi artists
