= Mirjan Mosque =

Sunni mosque in Baghdad, Iraq

- جامع مرجان
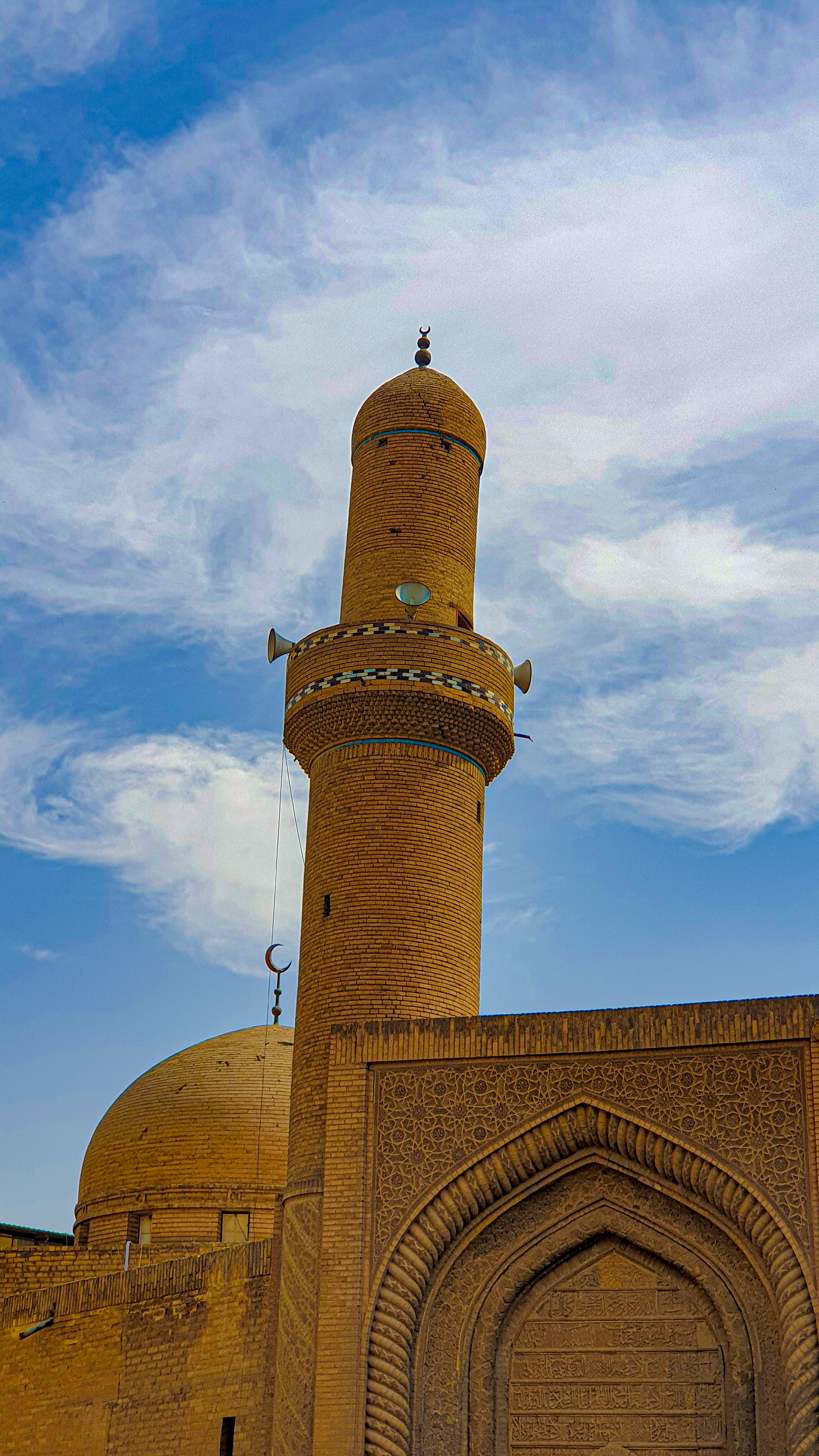
- The mosque in 2020

- Location of the mosque in Baghdad

Religion
- Affiliation: Sunni Islam
- Ecclesiastical or organizational status: Mosque
- Status: Active

Location
- Location: al-Rashid Street, Shorja, Baghdad
- Country: Iraq
- Interactive map of Mirjan Mosque
- Coordinates: 33°20′20″N 44°23′37″E

Architecture
- Type: Mosque architecture
- Founder: Amin al-Din Mirjan
- Completed: 1356 CE (madrasa)

Specifications
- Capacity: 1,200 worshipers
- Interior area: 1,500 m^{2} (16,000 sq ft)
- Dome: Three
- Minaret: One

The Mirjan Mosque (Arabic: جامع مرجان) is a Sunni mosque and former madrasa, located on al-Rashid Street located near the Shorja marketplace and the Abboud Building in Baghdad, in the Baghdad Governorate of Iraq. An important ancient landmark in Baghdad, the walled mosque contained the tombs of prominent Islamic scholars, including Nu'man al-Alusi.

== History ==
=== 14th to 19th century ===
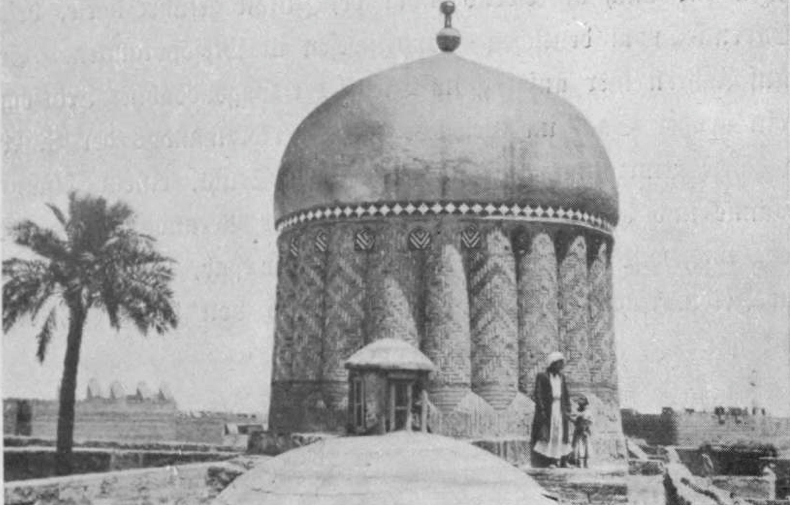
Tomb of Amin al-Din Mirjan in 1918, before destruction in 1946

There used to be a madrasa known as Madrasa Murjania, which was founded by Amin al-Din Mirjan by the funding of the Jalairid Sultan, Shaykh Uways Jalayir, in 1356. He had also built the Khan Murjan which is located nearby the mosque. The madrasa had taught the four Sunni maddhabs and was sustained by the supplies from Baghdad. Later the hospital that overlooked the Tigris was established for the students of science. The hospital was equipped with a café as well. After the death of Murjan in 1353, he was buried in the madrasa and the dome was erected on top of his tomb.

During James Silk Buckingham's visit to Baghdad in 1816, he visited the Mirjan Mosque going back from visiting al-Khulafa Mosque's remains and noted its inscriptions, entrance and brickwork. He noted that the mosque:

"Has some remains of equally old and very rich Arabesque work, on its surface. The body of the mosque itself is modern, and its interior presents nothing remarkable, but its door of entrance is very fine. This is formed by a lofty arch of the pointed form, bordered on each side by a succession of rich bands, exquisitely sculptured, going up its sides, and meeting at the top, nearly in the form of the arch itself."

— James Silk Buckingham, 1827.

=== 20th century ===
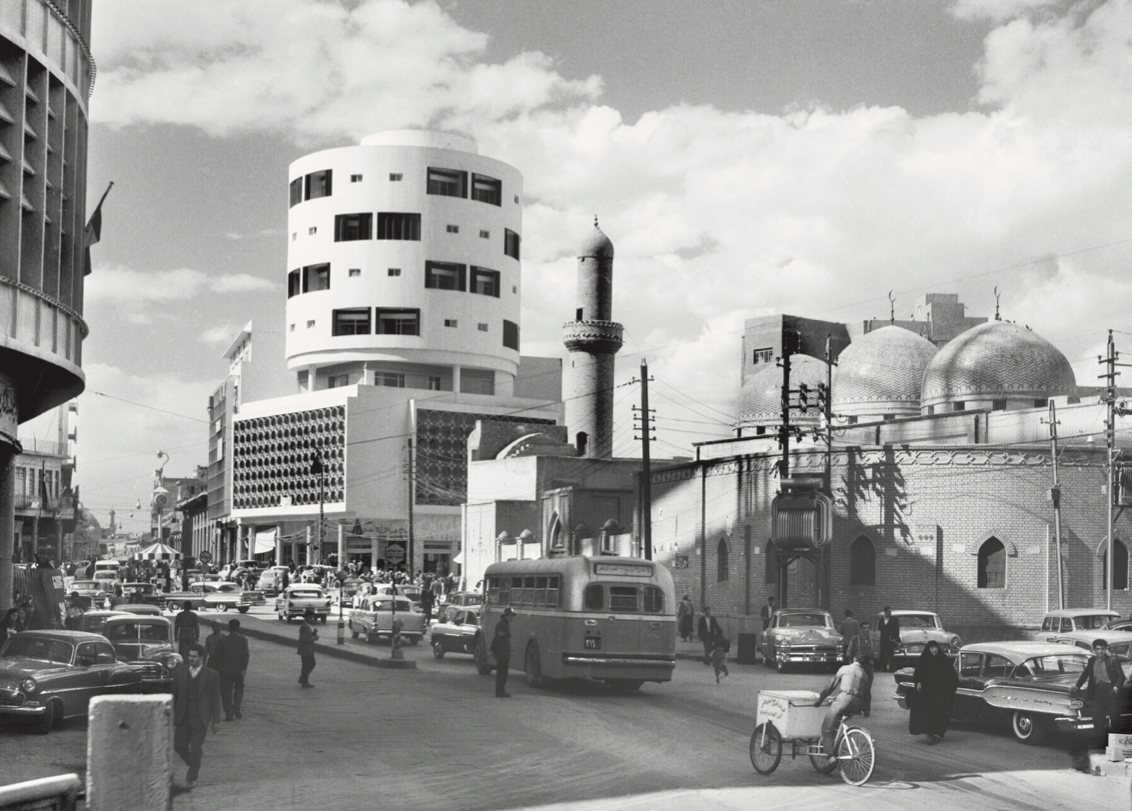
Photograph of the mosque by Latif al-Ani during the 1960s

When al-Rashid Street was opened after the independence of the Kingdom of Iraq, engineers suggested removing the mosque because it impeded the straightening of the street. However, King Faisal I rejected the idea in favor of preserving the mosque. This decision was also backed by British archeologist and writer Gertrude Bell who also recognized its important heritage. Although this controversy resurfaced during the expansion of al-Rashid Street in 1946, where it was suggested that parts of the mosque be cut. Many Baghdadi scholars were opponents to the idea of demolishing the mosque, which postponed demolition plans for a period.

Arshad al-Omari, mayor of the capital, held a press conference in its hall saying:

"I am surprised by this intense interest in an antique mosque that has been ruined, and I am ready to build in its place after its destruction a larger and more luxurious mosque. So why this insistence and adherence to it?"

— Arshad al-Omari.

Baghdadi Newspapers praised the mayor's statements. However, in favor of widening al-Rashid Street, parts of the mosque and the madrasa, along with the archaeological dome that contained the shrine of Amin al-Din Mirjan, were demolished.

The mosque was rebuilt along with its chapel on the other side of the mosque according to its original layout under the supervision of government departments. The mosque was renovated by the Ministry of Endowment and Religious Affairs in 1973.

=== 21st century ===
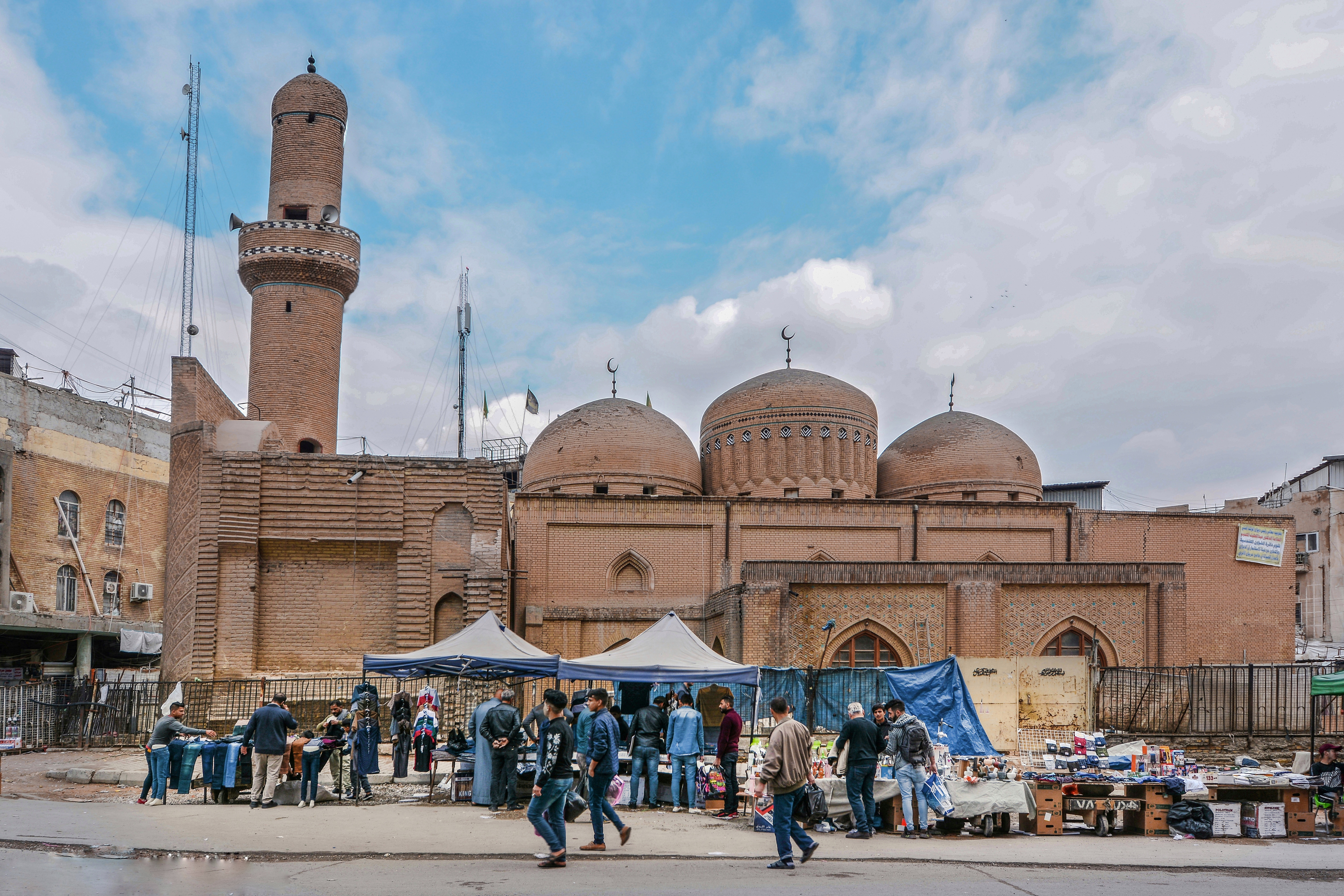
The mosque in 2014

In 2023, some Iraqis expressed their anger and shock, via social media, after the circulation of pictures that showcased the historic mosque in a state of neglect. The mosque was depicted as a waste dump. Images revealed a large amount of rubbish near its gate; other images revealed stagnant water and dirt that covered the entrance and the outer courtyards of the mosque. Activists warned of the danger of the mosque's gate collapsing due to the leakage of stale water into the foundations of the gate. The scene sparked a wave of anger among bloggers and activists about the government's continued neglect of archaeological and historical monuments, and their failure to subject them to the supervision of the Ministry of Culture and Tourism or to conduct periodic maintenance of monuments. The purported neglect was seen as an way to obliterate Baghdad's historical identity and harm its antiquities. Some suspected that the neglect was intentional.

== Architecture ==
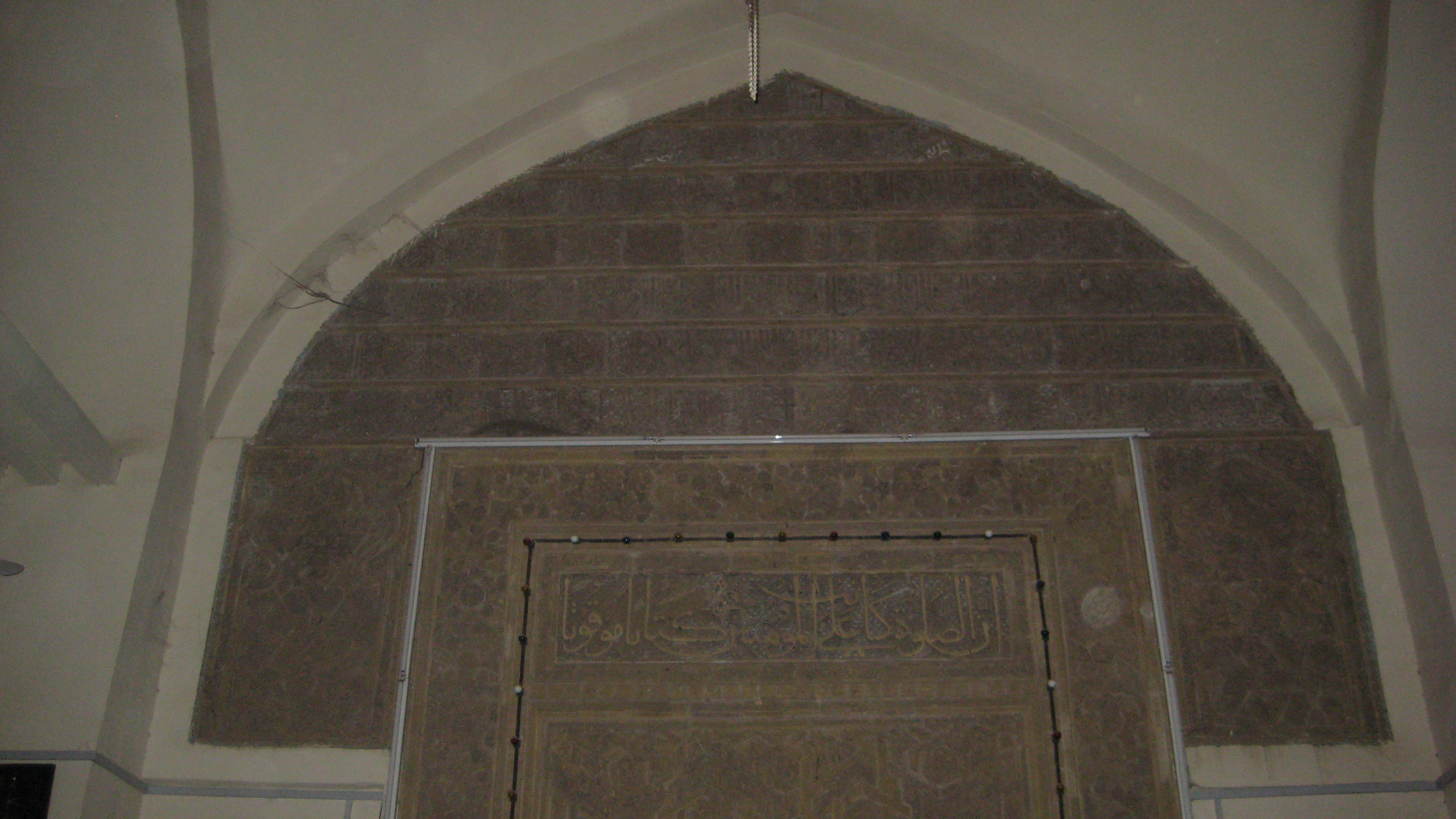
The Mihrab of the mosque

The mosque has an area of 1,500 square metres (16,000 sq ft) and can accommodate 1,200 worshipers. The prayer room is topped by one main dome and two small domes, and the mosque is enclosed by a wall. As for the shape of the building of the current mosque, its construction was established in another wing of the madrasa, where it was safe from the hand of demolition, and three domes were raised over it, the largest of which is the middle dome, in which the dome of the fleeting mosque largely imitated the madrasa's library. After 2003, the mosque's infrastructure became more chaotic with random basements and ceilings being built around it. Sellers left behind rubbish, and due to neglect, dirt and waste became common.

=== Madrasa library ===
The madrasa had a large library, a gift from the scholar Nu'man al-Alusi, who made it an endowment for the students of knowledge in the school. This library, which includes many manuscripts of rare Salafi books, was transferred to the Public Endowments Library, located in Bab al-Mu'adham, which was later burned down during the US Invasion of Iraq.

== See also ==
- Islam in Iraq
- List of mosques in Baghdad
