= Adila Khatun Mosque =

Ottoman-era mosque in Baghdad, Iraq

- جامع عادلة خاتون
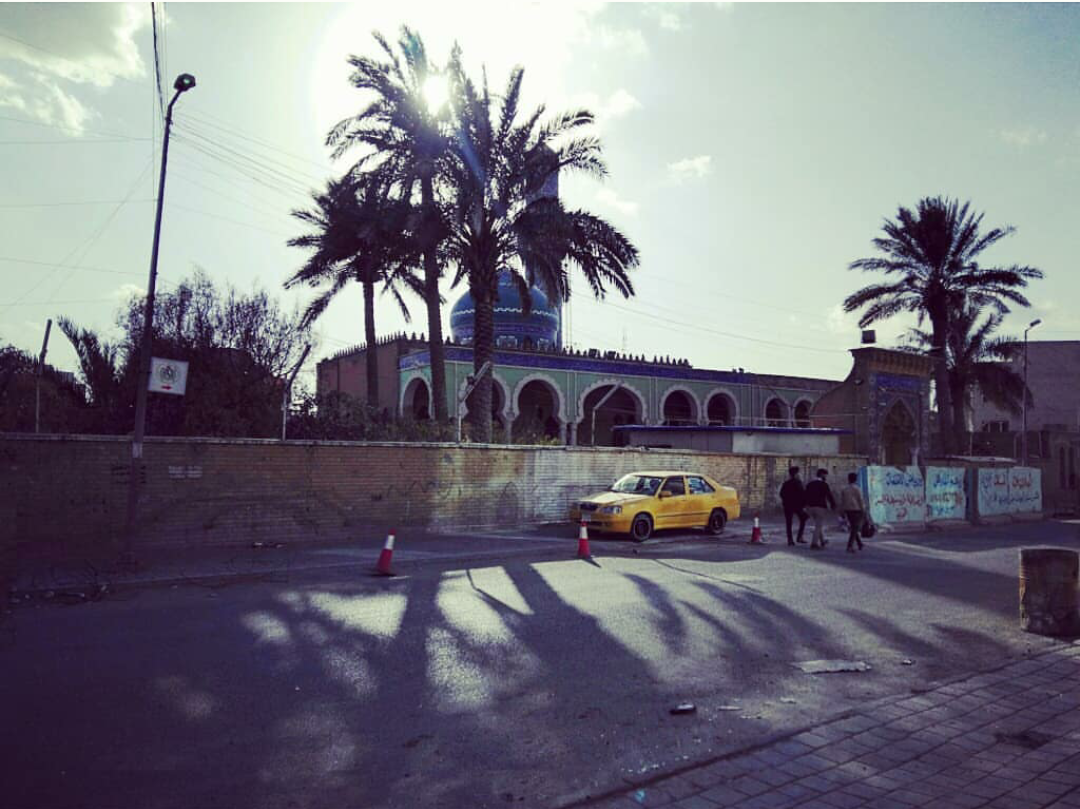
- The mosque in 2018

- Location of the mosque in Baghdad

Religion
- Affiliation: Sunni Islam
- Ecclesiastical or organizational status: Mosque
- Status: Active

Location
- Location: al-Rusafa, Baghdad, Baghdad Governorate
- Country: Iraq
- Interactive map of Adila Khatun Mosque
- Coordinates: 33°21′7″N 44°22′45″E

Architecture
- Type: Mosque architecture
- Style: Ottoman
- General contractor: Adila Khatun
- Completed: 1750 (first structure); 1962 (current structure)

Specifications
- Capacity: 500 worshipers
- Dome: One
- Minaret: One
- Materials: Bricks

The Adila Khatun Mosque (Arabic: جامع عادلة خاتون) is a Sunni mosque in the al-Rusafa district of Baghdad, in the Baghdad Governorate of Iraq. It was originally founded and built by Adila Khatun, the daughter of Ahmad Pasha ruler the Mamluk state of Iraq, and the wife of Sulayman Abu Layla. It is located on al-Rusafa district of Baghdad just near al-Sarafiya Bridge in al-Aywadiyya neighborhood (currently the Doctors’ Quarter).

== History ==
Adila Khatun was the daughter of Ahmad Pasha, the son of Hassan Pasha, who was founder of the Mamluk state of Iraq. She was married to Sulayman Abu Layla and was known for her projects and good deeds, this included the construction of mosques such as al-Adiliyya Mosque, and this mosque which was named after her. The mosque was named "The Great Mosque of Adila Khatun" and was originally located on al-Ma'mun Street near the entrance of Souk al-Safafeer, opposite the building of what is now the Baghdadi Museum.

In 1962, the government of Abd al-Karim Qasim demolished the old mosque in order to expand the street it was located on. After it was demolished that same year, the mosque was rebuilt to its current location al-Sarafiya area and took the same name as its predecessor.

During the Iraq War, the mosque was subjected to acts of vandalism due to sectarian strife, and parts of the mosque were destroyed by sectarian militias after the bombing of al-Askari Shrine in 2006 by a group of armed men. This led to its closure, then it was opened by the Sunni Endowment Office in 2007. Currently, Friday prayers and the five daily prayers are held in the mosque and the mosque is managed by the Sunni Endowment Office in Iraq.

== Architecture ==
The mosque has a spacious musalla (prayer hall) that can accommodate more than 500 worshipers. It is built of yellowish bricks and blue Kashani bricks. At the top of the door is written "The Mosque of Sayyida Adila Bint Ahmad Pasha, renovated by the General Endowments Directorate in the year 1382 AH/1962 AD". There is also another small door on the northeastern side. Written at the top in Kashani bricks is the text "Adila Khatun Mosque 1382 AH/1967 AD." As for the sanctuary's musalla, it's rectangular in shape with its width being eleven meters and its length being eighteen meters, surrounded by windows. The floor of the prayer space is furnished with Iraqi carpets, and in the middle of the musalla are four concrete arched columns above which stands the blue dome of the musalla of the mosque.

== See also ==
- Islam in Iraq
- List of mosques in Baghdad
- 2006 al-Askari mosque bombing
