= Khan Mirjan =

Coordinates: 33.3386°N 44.3925°E

- خان مرجان (Arabic)
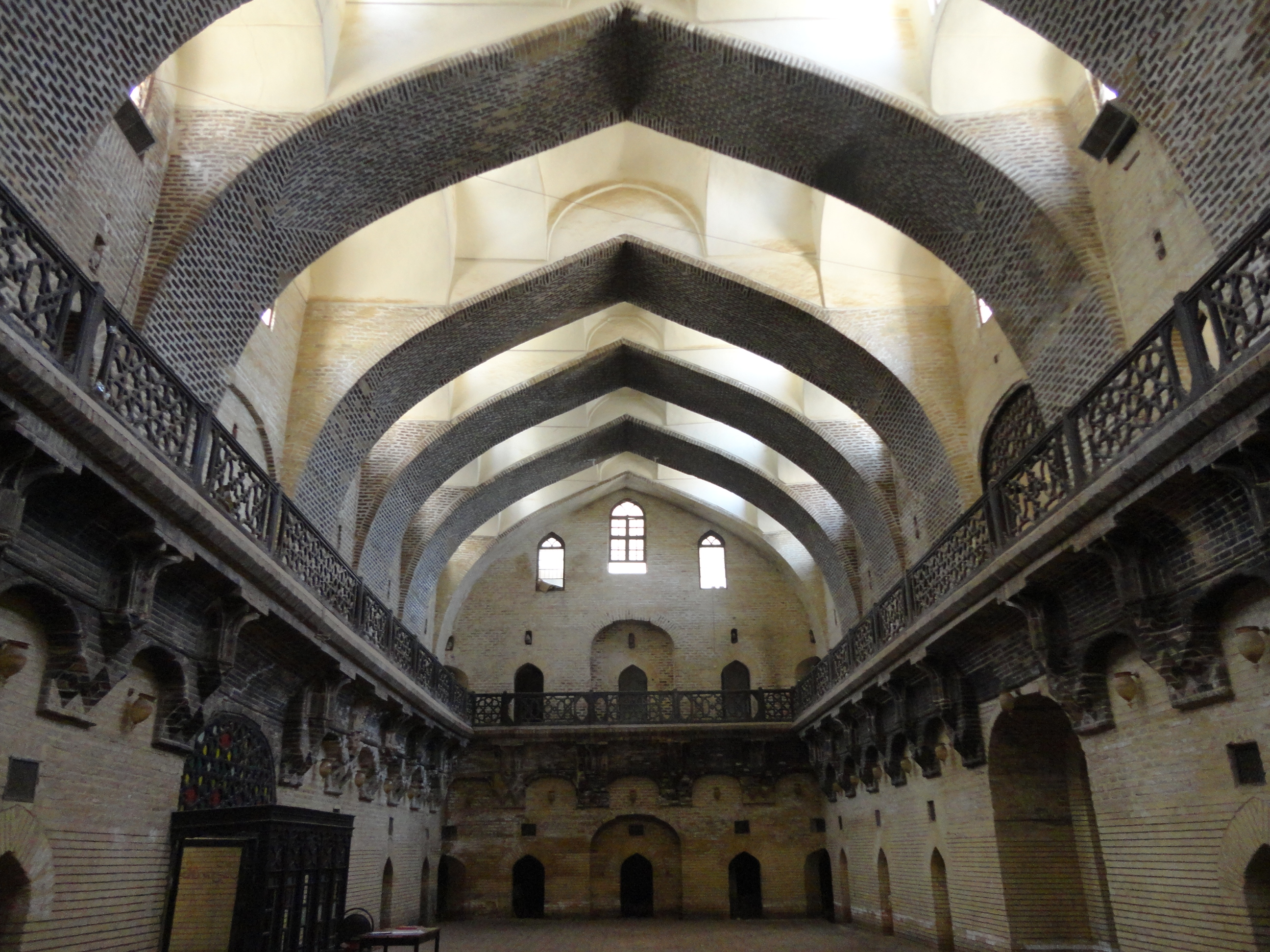
- Interactive map of Khan Mirjan
- Location: 89QR+CXM, Baghdad, Iraq

History
- Built: 1356–1358
- Built for: Merchants needing a Khan

Site notes
- Architectural style: Baghdadi Architecture
- Restored: Mid-1980s

The Khan Mirjan (Arabic: خان مرجان) is a building in the souk of Baghdad, Iraq. It was built by the Jalayirid governor of Baghdad, Amin al-Din Mirjan in the 14th century originally as a caravanserai, an inn for traveling merchants, with a large center hall that was 13 metres (43 ft) high. It features crenelated arches of brick, as well as perforated windows.

The building was reputedly in a state of disrepair for over two centuries, with waist-high flood water from the Tigris standing in the famous hallway. By the mid-1980s, the building had been restored and was in use as a restaurant.

== History ==
The Khan Mirjan was built between 1356 and 1358 by Amin al-Din Mirjan, the Jalayirid governor of Baghdad whom had also built the nearby Mirjan Mosque. The khan is distinguished from other khans, another term for caravanserai, by its architecture: its inner courtyard is covered by huge arches of bricks, with a ceiling height of 13 meters. The khan has two floors: the ground floor contains 22 rooms, and the upper floor contains 23 rooms. The outside is decorated with Islamic calligraphy. The main function of the khan is to shelter merchants, their caravans, their goods, and the animals carrying the goods. It also remains one of the rare khans whose plan did not include an open central courtyard, as is the case with the designs of most other khans.

In 1937, a Museum of Arab Antiquities was opened in the former Khan Mirjan building. This museum was dedicated to Islamic artifacts in a show of Arab nationalism by the Director of Antiquities, Sati' al-Husri. By the mid-1980s, under the leadership of Saddam Hussein, the building was turned into a tourist restaurant in which it materialized an authentic Baghdadi atmosphere with Iraqi Maqam being played inside. Waiters could be found in traditional clothing with guests singing at their tables. Additionally, Maqam artists such as Yousef Omar have been invited to play.

== Present ==
Today, the Khan Mirjan is among the oldest of the remaining khans in Iraq and is operated by Liwan for Culture and Development and the State Board of Antiquities and Heritage (SBAH). Its restoration is being led by the International Alliance for the Protection of Heritage in Conflict Areas.

The influence of the Khan Mirjan is apparent beyond Baghdad. In Dubai, United Arab Emirates, the Khan Mirjan Souk at WAFI Mall is a popular tourist destination. The mall spectacle has four quarters that are set in a 14th-century souk with decorations and architecture influenced by historic Egypt, Syria, Morocco, and Turkey. The WAFI Mall also hosts the Khan Mirjan Restaurant, where people can have breakfast, lunch, and dinner.

In Tampa, Florida, a restaurant called the Khan Mirjan served traditional Iraqi and Halal food. The restaurant was closed as of November 2023.

== Gallery ==
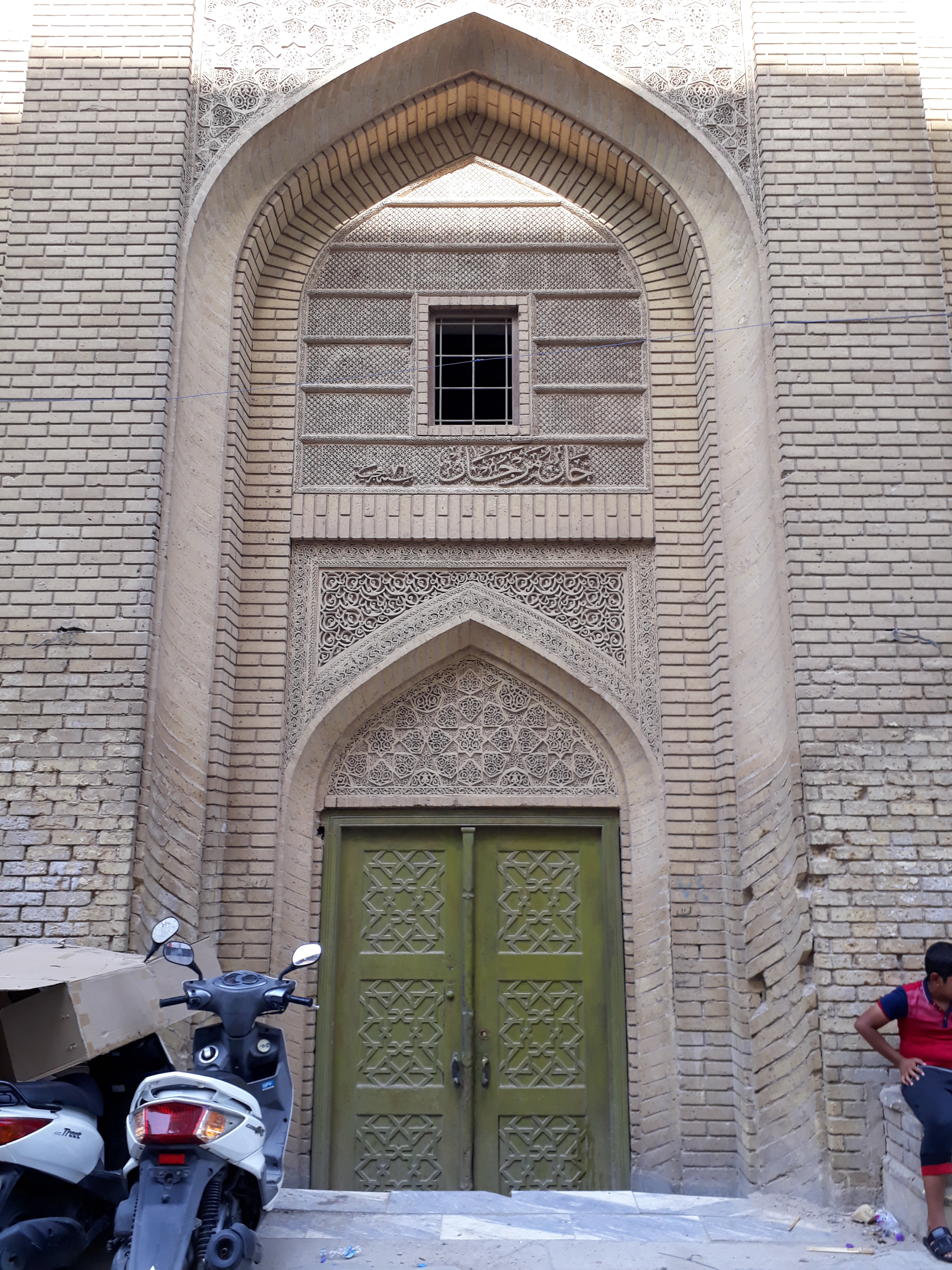
Entrance

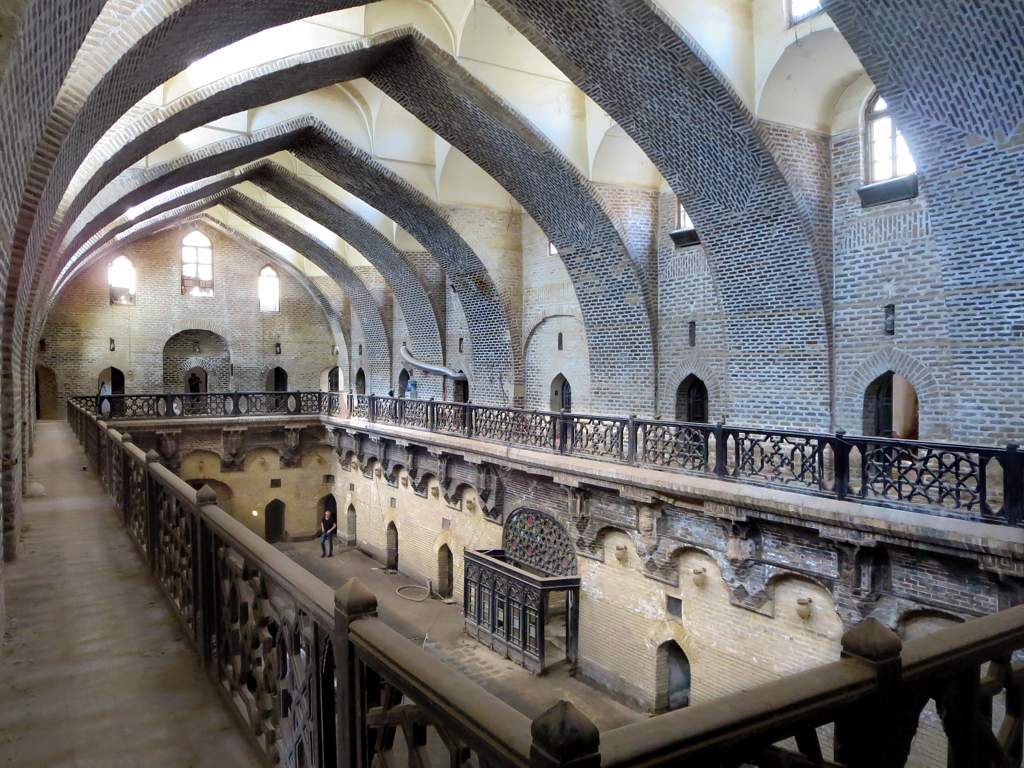
Interior

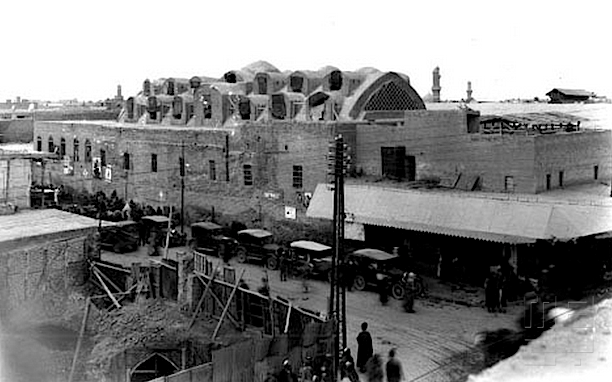
Old exterior, 1930s

== Sources ==
- Babaie, Sussan (2019). Iran After the Mongols. Bloomsbury Publishing. ISBN 978-1-78831-528-9.
