= Adila Khatun =

Adila Khatun (Arabic:عادلة خاتون; died 1768) was a noblewoman of Ottoman Iraq. She was the daughter of Baghdad's governor between 1723 and 1747 Ahmad Pasha and the wife of his successor, Sulayman pasha, who governed in Baghdad from 1749 to 1761 She was well known for her charity work and her sponsorship of building projects, most notable among them Al-Adiliyah Mosque and the Adila Khatun Mosque.

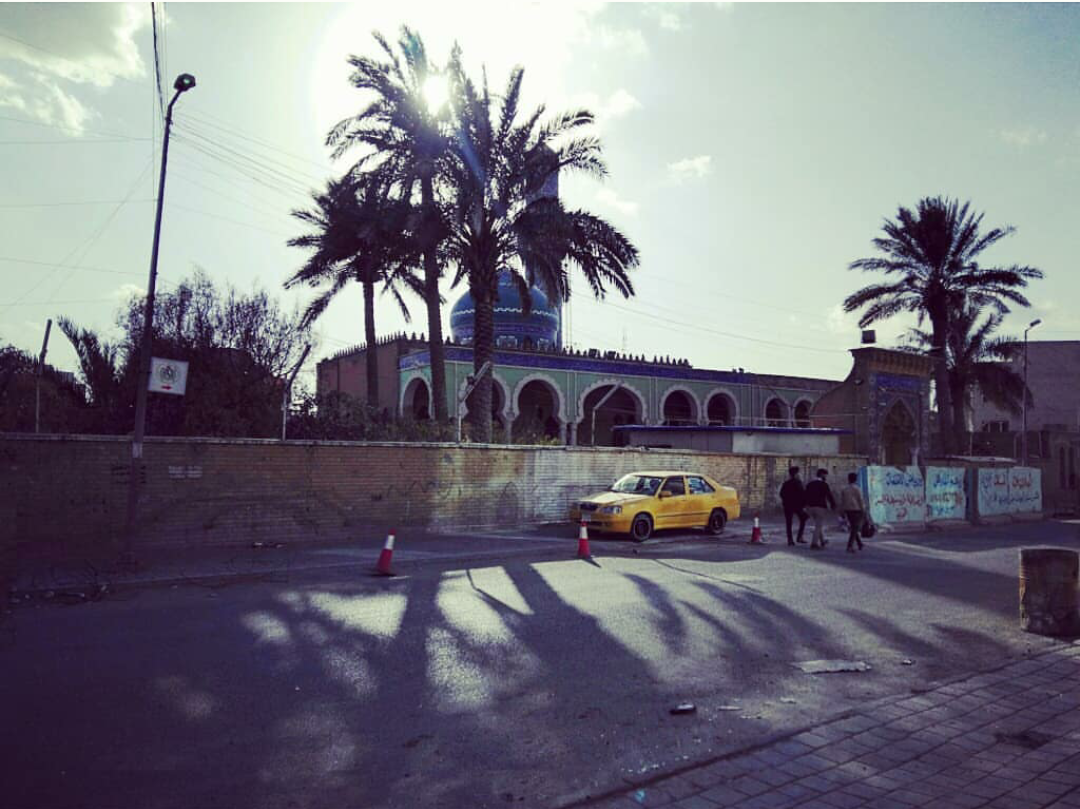
Adila Khatun Mosque, Baghdad

== Life ==
Adila's date of birth is not known; some sources place her birth as early as 1700, based on her marriage date and that of her younger sister. Historians speculate it's around 1717. Little is known about her mother, Kulrukh hanim (Arabic: كُلرخ خانم), or when she died, but her grandfather and father were Ottoman governors of Baghdad. She was the eldest of two sisters and lived in her father's mansion in Baghdad until her marriage in 1745 to Sulayman abu Lyla, who was a Mamluk of her father. When her husband was appointed governor of Basra in 1748, she moved with him to live there, but she came back in 1750 when her father died, and her husband took his place as governor of Baghdad.

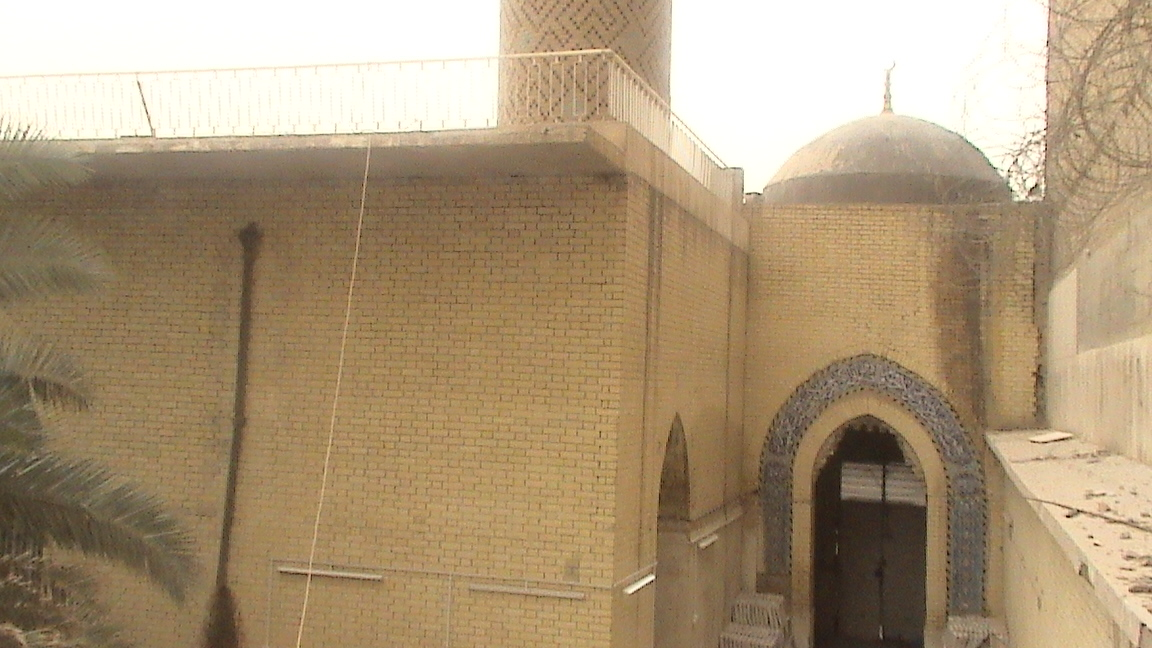
Al-Adiliyah Mosque, built 1749

Adila was described as a strong influence on her husband; she is said to be behind many of his administrative decisions and military campaigns. She was also known for her social status as a central figure among the nobility, accepting petitions and meeting dignitaries on behalf of her husband. Adila didn't have any children, and after the death of her husband in 1761, she dedicated her time to the building projects she is most remembered for today, such as the Adila Khatun Mosque, the Adila school, the Bagdad courthouse and the Qushtapa khan for travelers.

Adila died in 1768, she was buried alongside her father and grandfather near the Abu Hanifa Mosque. In 1934, her remains were moved to the courthouse she sponsored after it was rebuilt.
