= Amin al-Din Mirjan =

Emir of Baghdad under the Jalayirids (d. 1372)

Amīn al-Dīn Marjān
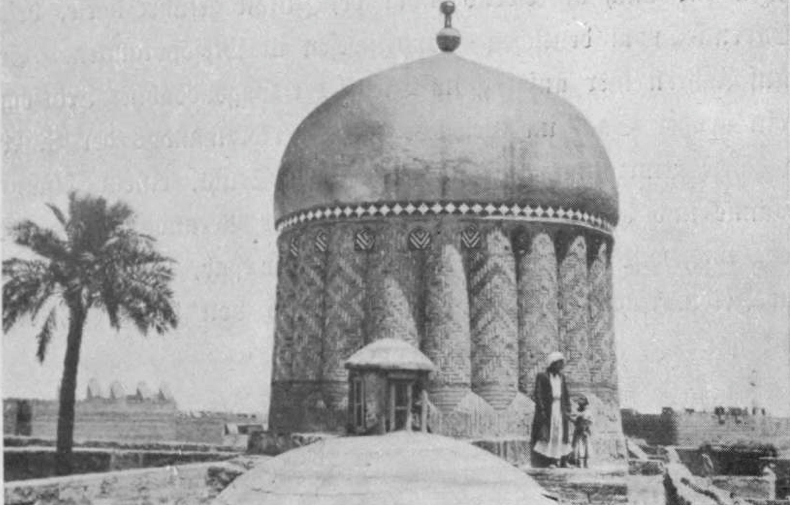
- A photograph taken in 1918, showing the dome atop the mausoleum of Marjan located along al-Rashid Street.

Personal life
- Died: 1372 Baghdad, Iraq
- Resting place: Marjan Mosque, Baghdad
- Occupation: Emir of Baghdad under the Jalayirids

Religious life
- Religion: Sunni Islam

Amīn al-Dīn Marjān (Arabic: أمين الدين مرجان) was an emir of Baghdad under Shaykh Uways Jalayir, the Jalayirid ruler of Iraq and Azerbaijan. He was the founder of the historic Marjan Mosque located across al-Rashid Street in Baghdad. Marjan led a revolt against Shaykh Uways Jalayir in 1364 but was defeated and eventually pardoned.

== Early life ==
The early life of Amin al-Din Marjan is relatively unknown. According to Ibn Hajar al-Asqalani, his full name is Marjan ibn 'Abd Allah al-Khadim. He was formerly a slave and the childhood best friend of Shaykh Uways Jalayir but was later freed and subsequently rose to prominence in the Jalayirid court, leading to him being appointed as the emir of Baghdad by his former master.

== Revolt against the Jalayirids ==
In 1364, Amin al-Din Marjan led a revolt against his former master Shaykh Uways Jalayir with the support of the Shirvanshahs as well as the Mamluk Sultan Al-Ashraf Sha'ban who were rivals of the Jalayirids at the time. With the help of Qara Mahammad, the Jalayirid forces were able to crush the rebellion. Marjan was arrested and deposed, while a nobleman from the house of Qara named Murad occupied his former position. Due to the intercession of the scholars of Baghdad, Shaykh Uways Jalayir pardoned Marjan and spared him from being executed. Marjan was later reinstated as the emir of Baghdad in 1367, although he was forced to start over from scratch due to the fact that Shaykh Uways had still confiscated most of his wealth and properties as punishment.

== Death and legacy ==
Upon his return to Baghdad in 1365, Marjan built a madrasa as gratitude for the intercessions of the local scholars. He died in 1372 and was buried in a domed chamber in his madrasa. During the Ottoman period, the madrasa was converted into a mosque, known as the Marjan Mosque. Part of the madrasa including the tomb of Marjan was demolished in 1946 to make way for the expansion of al-Rashid Street. Fictional narratives of Marjan were popular amongst the locals of Baghdad, who believed that Marjan was originally an Italian man named Morgan who became an ascetic and a volunteer at the mosque he founded.
