= Souk al-Safafeer =

Ancient copper souk in Baghdad, Iraq

- سوق الصفافير (Arabic)
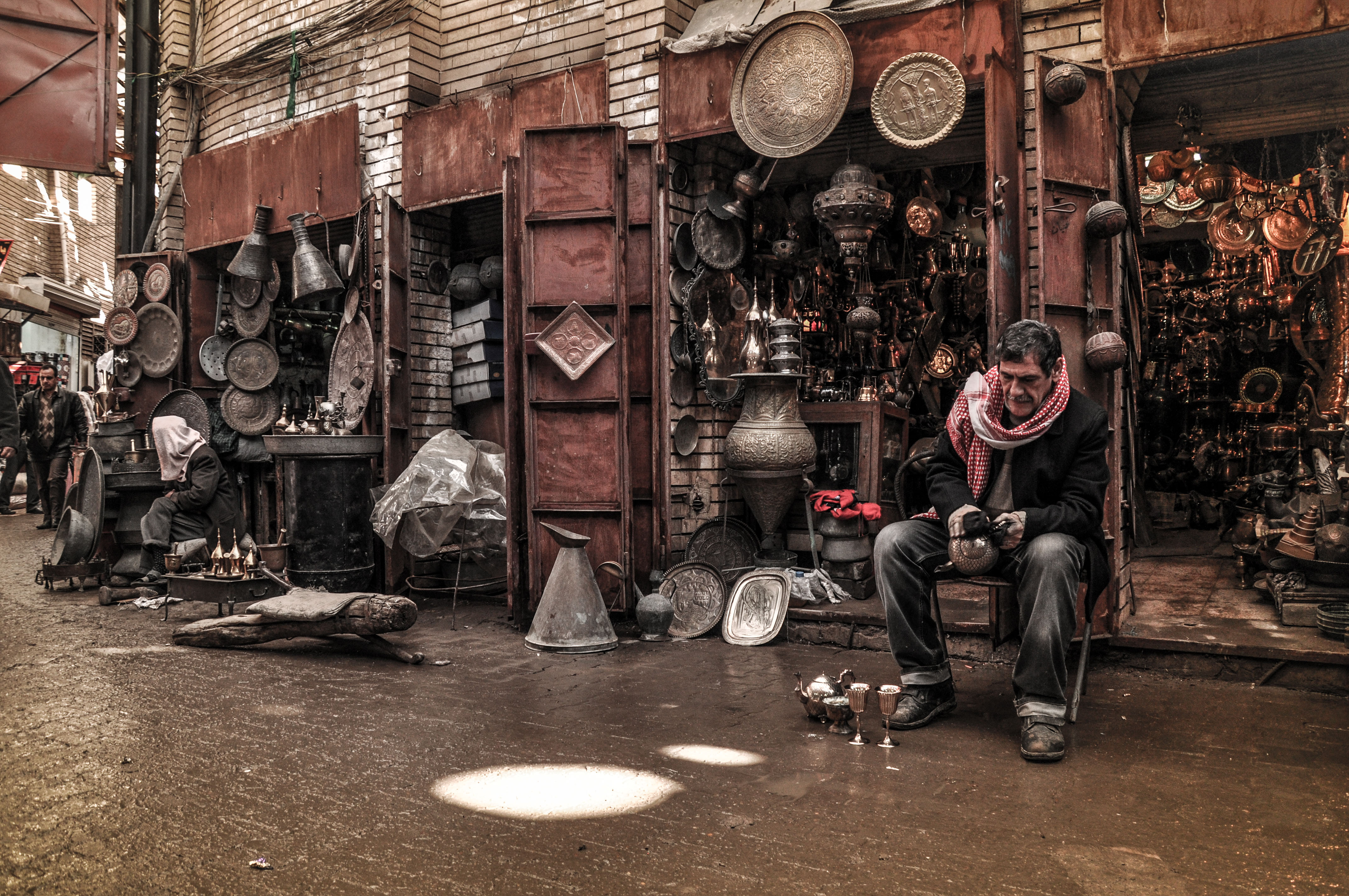
- A part of the souk
- Interactive map of Souk al-Safafeer
- Type: Bazaar, Souq
- Location: Baghdad, Iraq

History
- Founded: Abbasid period

Souk al-Safafeer (Arabic: سوق الصفافير, lit. 'Market of the yellow copper') is an ancient souk or bazaar in Baghdad, Iraq, that branches off al-Rashid Street and connects to al-Mustansiriyya Madrasa. The souk was established in Central Baghdad on the shores of the Tigris River in the Abbasid period and has been active ever since. Traditionally, the souk's craftsmen are specialized in creating handmade copperwork for household or decorative uses using simple tools like hammers and hand tools.

The souk is notable for the large amount of hammer-beating sounds that echoed throughout the market and its quality. Despite the significant role the souk plays in its area, the souk has been suffering greatly after the US invasion of Iraq in 2003.

== Etymology ==
Souk al-Safafeer was named after the Arabic word for the yellowish tint of copper.

== Description ==
=== General layout ===
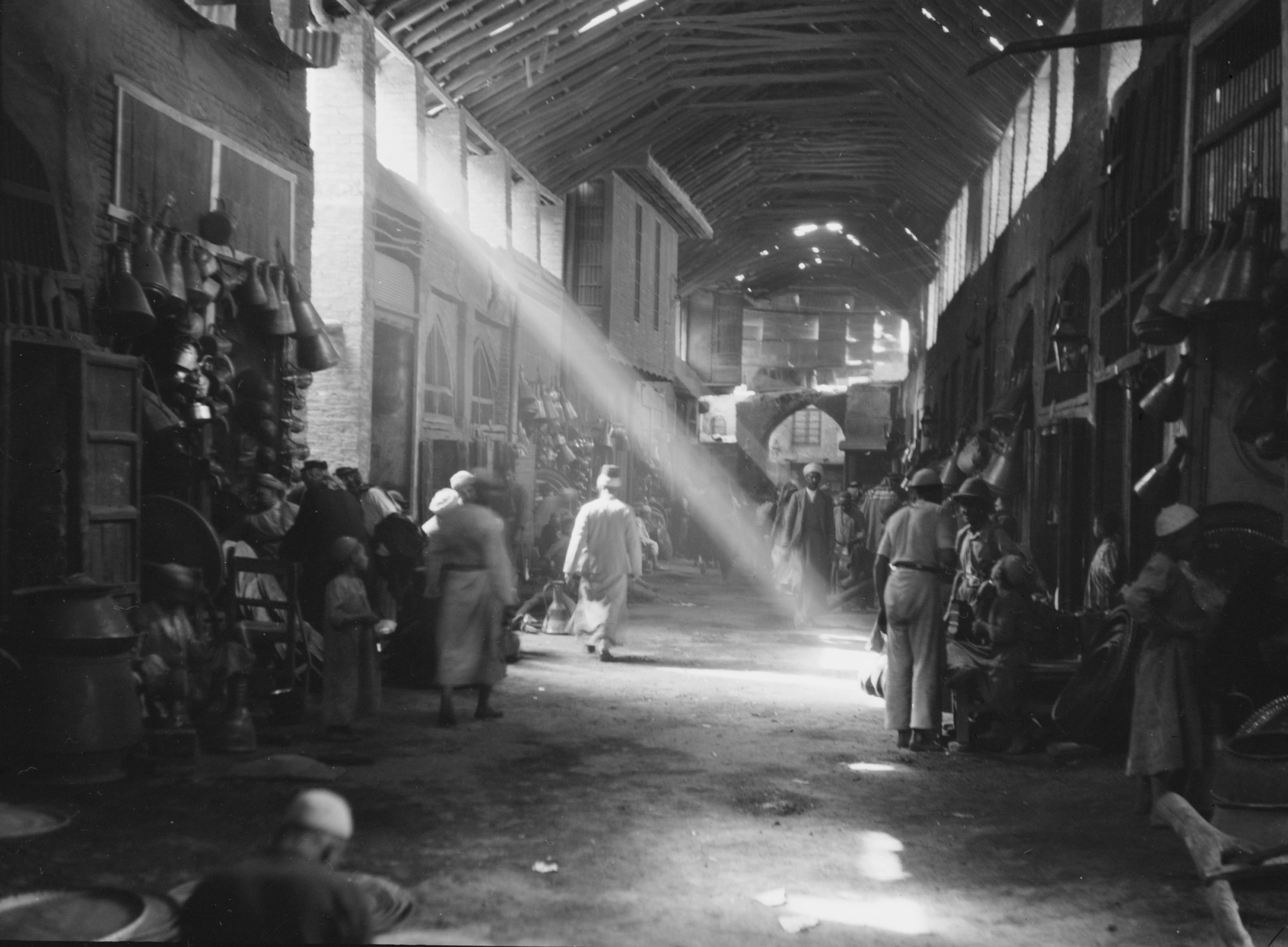
The souk selling copper pots and plates in 1932.

The current market is said to date back to between 1600 and 1618 during the Ottoman period and is located on the western side of al-Rasheed Street. Located near the Tigris River, the souk is 500 meters wide and contains many handmade copperwork. These copperwork items, which include plates and shapes, are contained inside many shops owned by the coppersmiths.

The number of shops in the market was estimated to be 200. The market does not accept any foreign material to sell. Instead, all the copperwork in the market is done by the coppersmiths by hand. Traditionally, many of the coppersmiths and craftsmen are relatives of previous coppersmiths who worked in the same markets over many generations and who have inherited the profession. The workers of the markets who inherited the profession have also inherited their characteristics. Which include "precision, patience, deliberation, and taste."

=== Mosque ===
Souk al-Safafeer contains an old archaeological mosque, called al-Safareen Mosque. Its area is approximately 250 square meters, and it contains a small prayer space that can accommodate more than 40 worshipers. This mosque was built by a philanthropist during the time of the Ottoman Empire, specifically in the middle of the 18th century.

== Present day ==
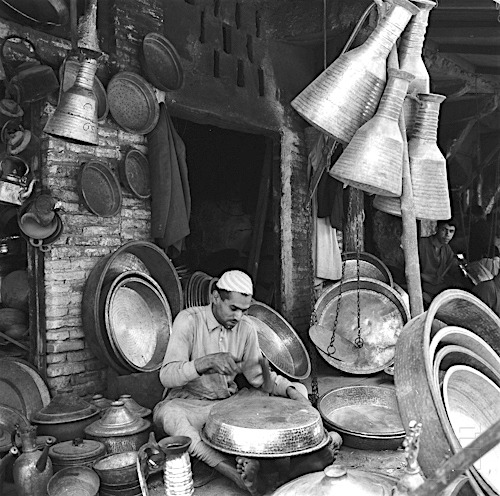
A coppersmith in the market in 1962, photographed by photographer Latif al-Ani.

Under former Iraqi president Saddam Hussein, a law was established that every building or establishment in Iraq that dates back a hundred years is considered a heritage site and should be preserved. Among the sites that were on the list were al-Maiden Square, al-Rasheed Street and Souk al-Safafeer. However, this law was abolished after the US invasion of Iraq in 2003. During the Iraq War, many US coalition troops bought a lot of the items in the market which left barely any remaining antiques and copperwork. This was also the same period in which many of the workers fled the country, leaving it empty. Many fake Iraqi antiques have also started to materialize in the market.

Since the US invasion that toppled former president Saddam Hussein and the Ba'ath Party in 2003, the souk has been declining and suffering from government neglect and a lack of customers and tourists visiting it. Before the invasion, the market included 68 coppersmiths but as of 2018, only 10 of them remained. Demand for copper materials declined as the average Iraqi salary, which is currently 400 dinars per month, declined. As such, customers didn't have enough money to buy copper items from the market. Furthermore, many of the coppersmith shops, estimated to be 90% of the souk, were turned into fabric stalls which added to the decline of the heritage and traditional role of the souk.

Many of the shops have been sold or rented by the original shop owners. There was also the issue of shop owners who imported cheap Chinese materials in order to make a quick profit. The biggest issue that the market faces has been cited by the remaining coppersmiths to be government neglect and lack of support from state officials.

== See also ==
- Souk al-Sarai
