= Abboud Building =

Coordinates: 33°20′22″N 44°23′35″E

- عمارة عبود
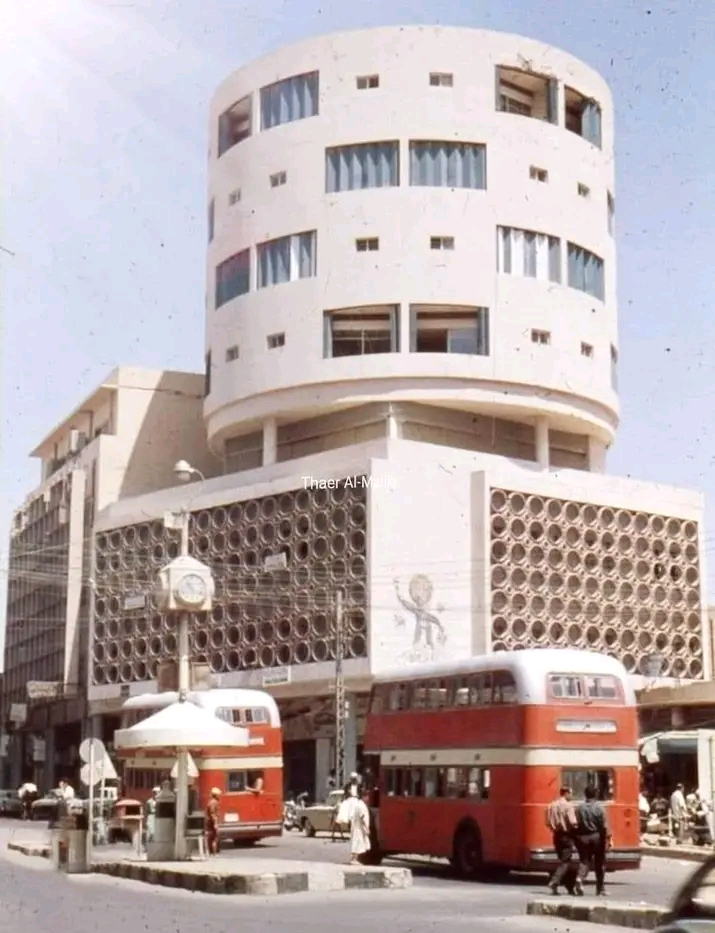
- Interactive map of Abboud Building

General information
- Location: Al-Rashid Street in Baghdad, Iraq
- Completed: 1955
- Owner: Abd al-Aziz al-Thakeer

Design and construction
- Architect: Rifat Chadirji

The Abboud building (Arabic: عمارة عبود), also known as al-Thukair building (Arabic: عمارة الذكير), is one of the most iconic buildings in Baghdad, Iraq, located at the entrance to Shorja on the side of al-Rashid Street near the Mirjan Mosque. It is distinguished by its modern design in its age and circular shape.

== History ==
The building was commissioned by Abdullah Ihsan Kamel, who was a professor at the University of Baghdad. With the participation of Iraqi artist and architect Rifat Chadirji, the two designed and built the building which at that time became iconic for its unusual cylindrical form, and its bright white color. This was intentional to create a sense of "harmony" with its surroundings and evoke the values and evidence of the past with modernist interpretation.

== Gallery ==
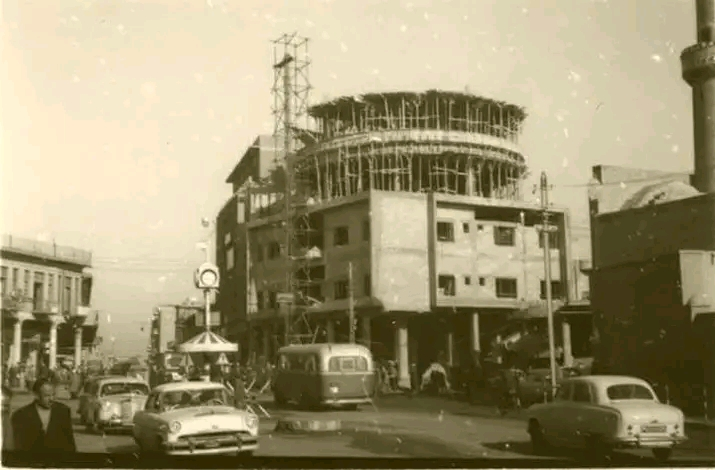
Abboud Building under construction in the early 1950s

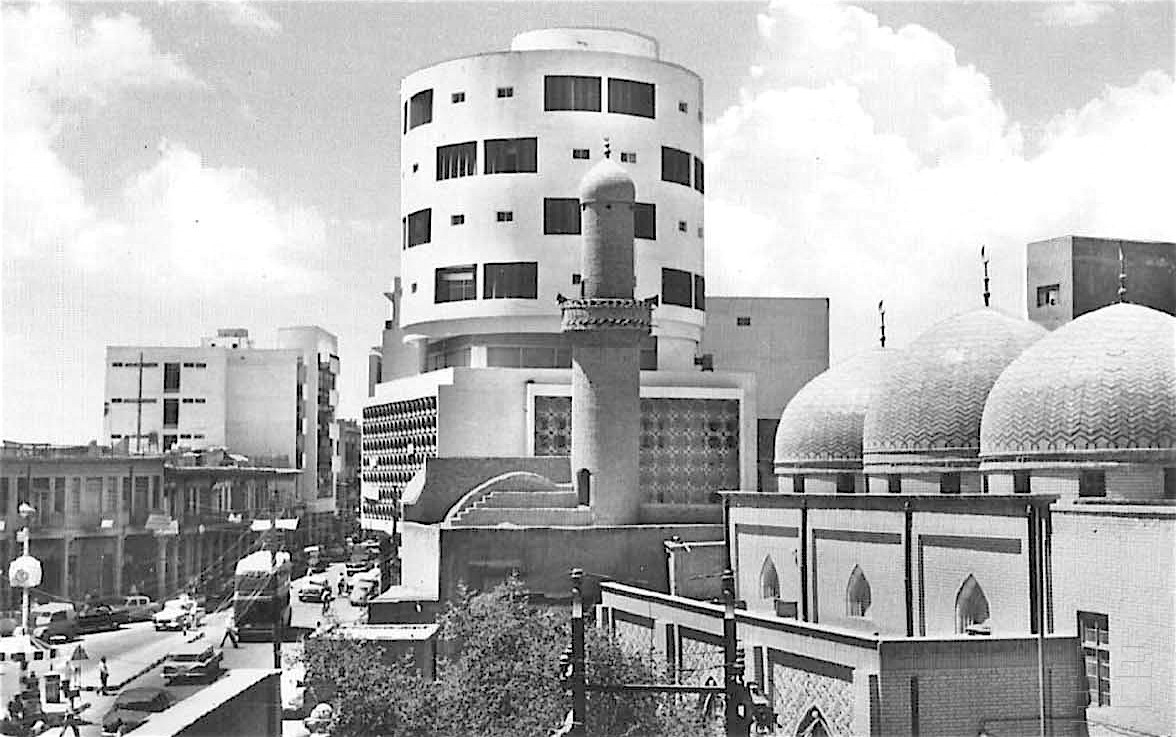
The Building along with the Mirjan Mosque during the 1960s

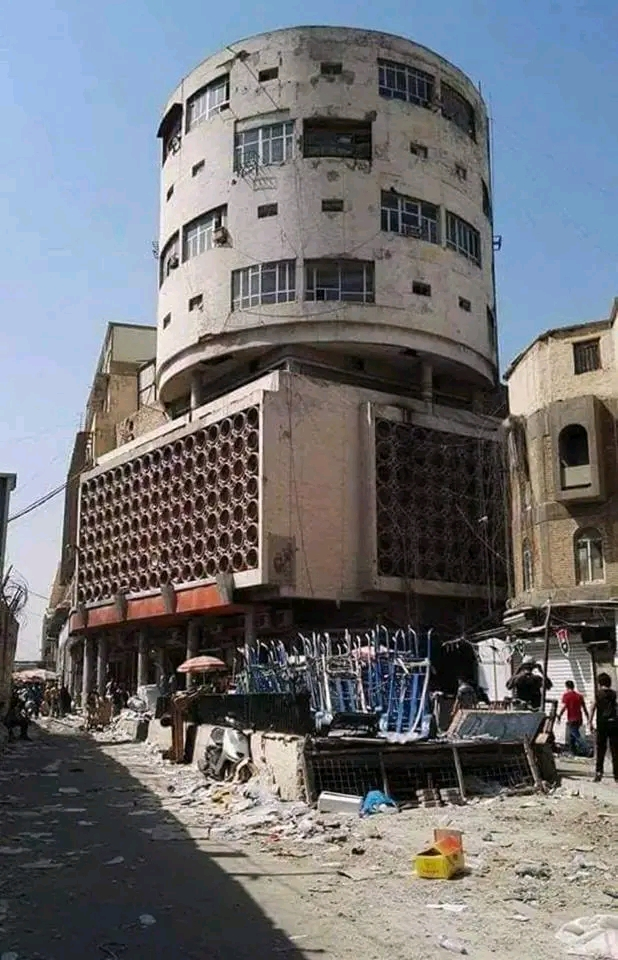
The current condition of the building as of late 2022
